= Outline of Istanbul =

Largest city in Turkey

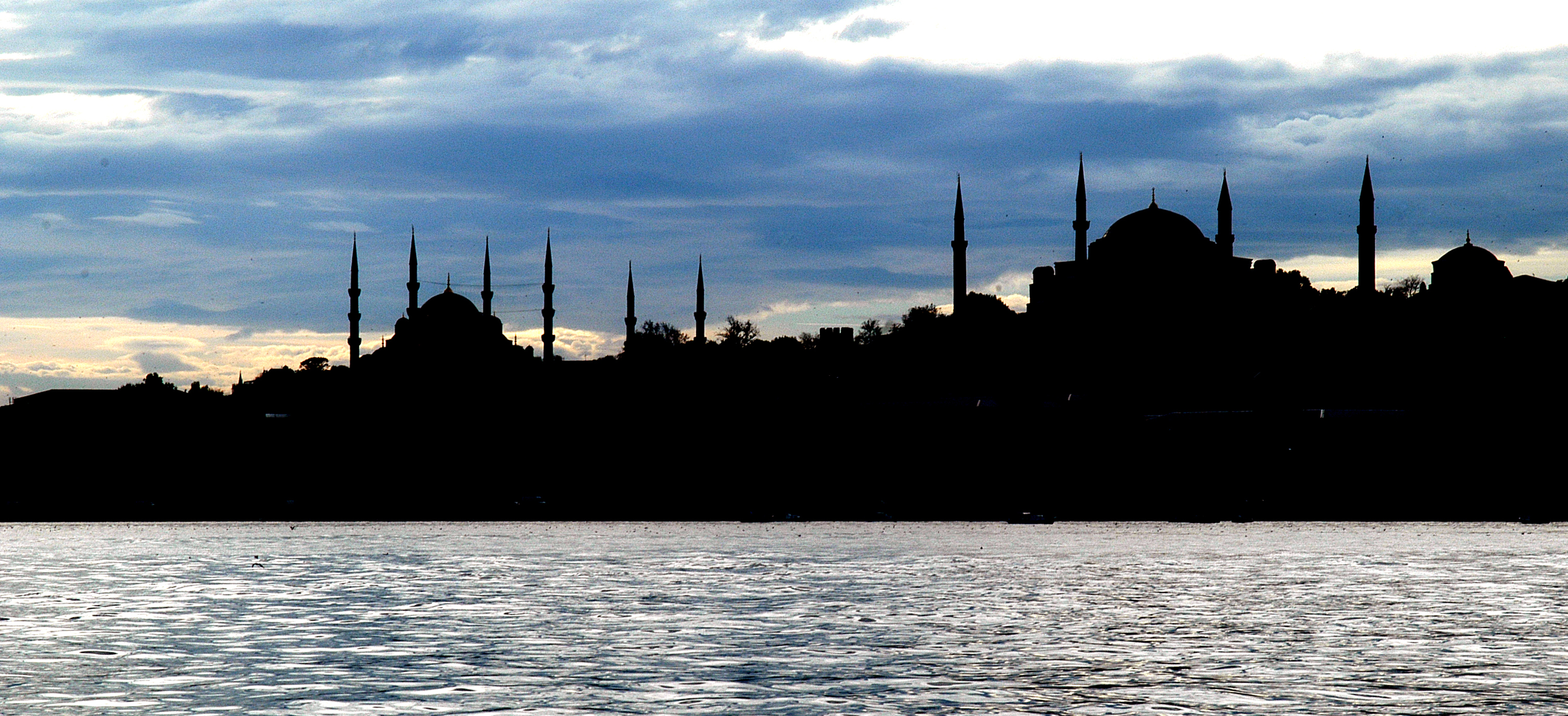
Istanbul

The following outline is provided as an overview of and topical guide to Istanbul:

Istanbul –

== General reference ==
- Pronunciation: /ˌɪstænˈbʊl/ IST-an-BUUL, US also /ˈɪstænbʊl/ IST-an-buul; Turkish: İstanbul [isˈtanbuɫ])
- Toponymy: Names of Istanbul
- Common English name(s): Istanbul
- Official English name(s): Istanbul
- Adjectival(s): Istanbulite
- Demonym(s): Istanbulite

== Geography of Istanbul ==
Geography of Istanbul

- Istanbul is:
  - a city
- Population of Istanbul: 14,804,116
- Area of Istanbul: 5,343.02 km^{2} (2,062.95 sq mi)

Istanbul İstanbul
- Location within Turkey
- Coordinates: 41°00′N 28°57′E

=== Location of Istanbul ===
- Istanbul is situated within the following regions:
  - Northern Hemisphere and Eastern Hemisphere
    - Asia
      - Western Asia (outline)
        - Greater Middle East
          - Turkey (outline)
            - Marmara Region
              - Istanbul Province
- Time zone(s):
  - TRT (UTC+03)

=== Environment of Istanbul ===
- Climate of Istanbul

==== Natural geographic features of Istanbul ====
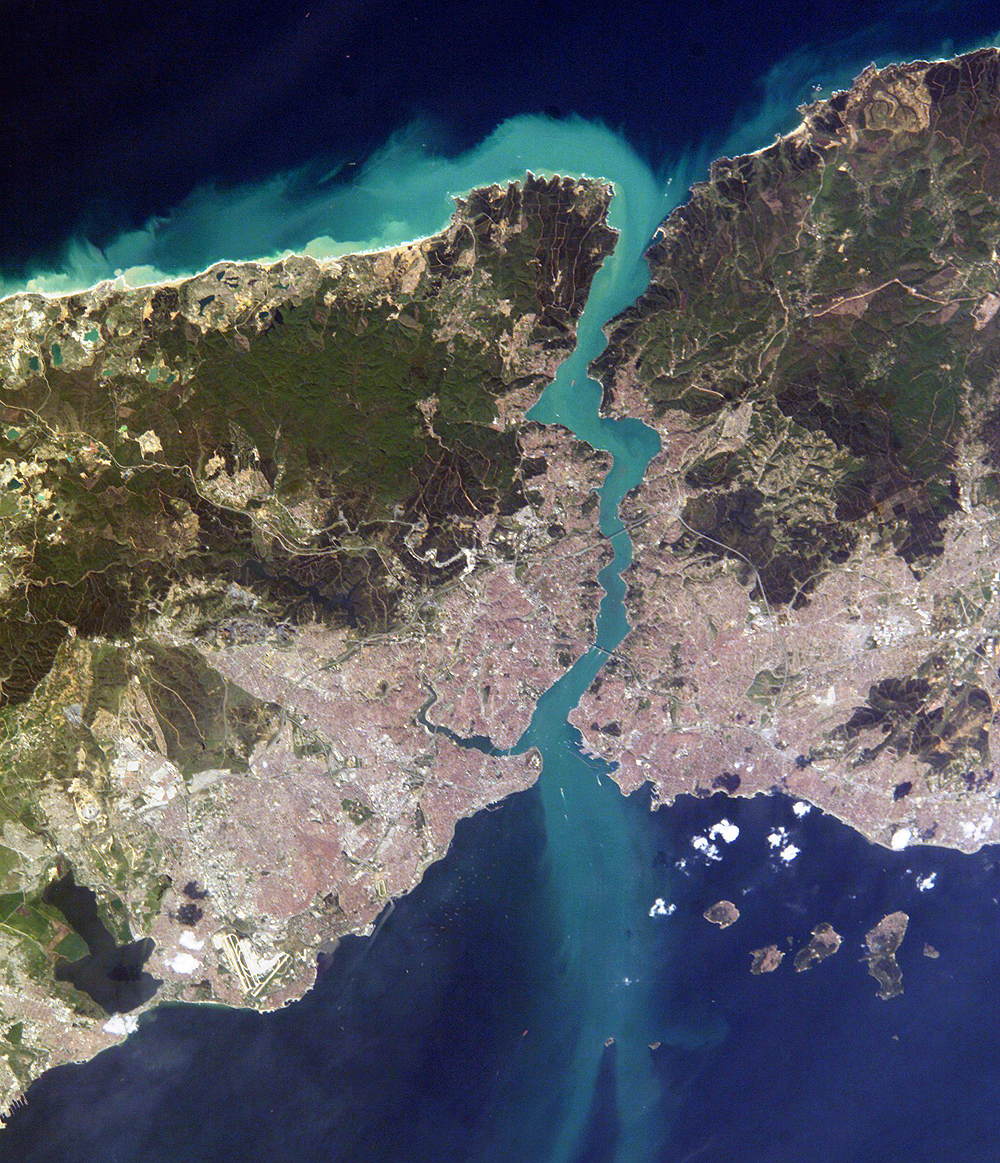
Satellite view of Istanbul and the Bosphorus strait

- Canals in Istanbul
  - Istanbul Canal
- Hills in Istanbul
  - Seven hills of Istanbul
    - Çamlıca Hill
  - Sarayburnu
- Inlets in Istanbul
  - Golden Horn
- Islands in Istanbul
  - Princes' Islands
- Straits in Istanbul
  - Bosporus

=== Areas of Istanbul ===
The districts of Istanbul

Districts of Istanbul

==== Urban centers in Istanbul ====
Urban centers in Istanbul

==== Neighbourhoods in Istanbul ====
Neighbourhoods of Istanbul

- Fatih
- Galata

=== Locations in Istanbul ===
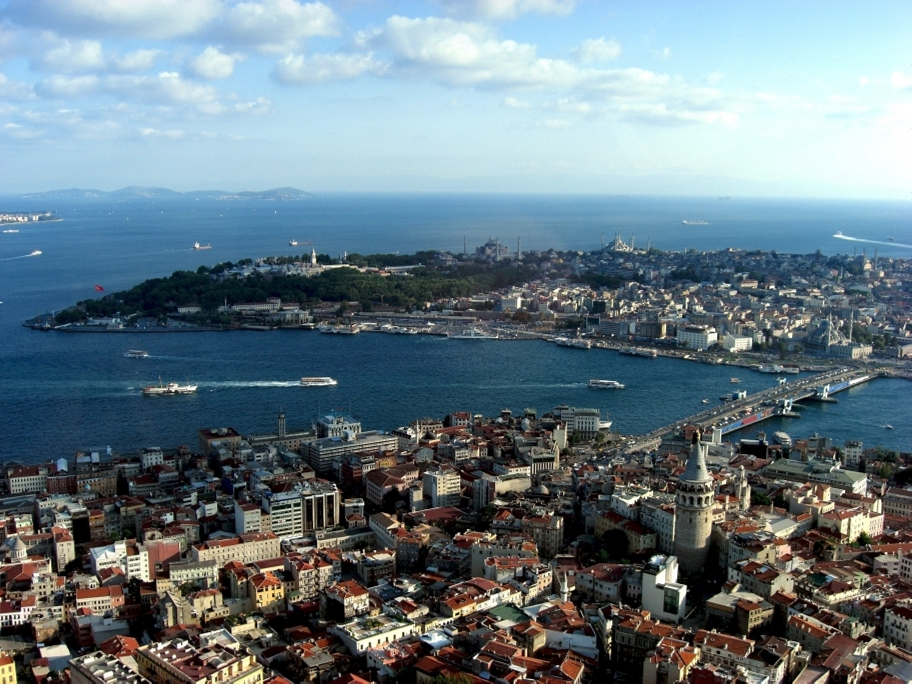
Historic Areas of Istanbul

- Tourist attractions in Istanbul
  - Museums in Istanbul
    - Pera Museum
  - Shopping areas and markets
    - Grand Bazaar
  - World Heritage Sites in Istanbul
    - Historic Areas of Istanbul

==== Ancient monuments in Istanbul ====
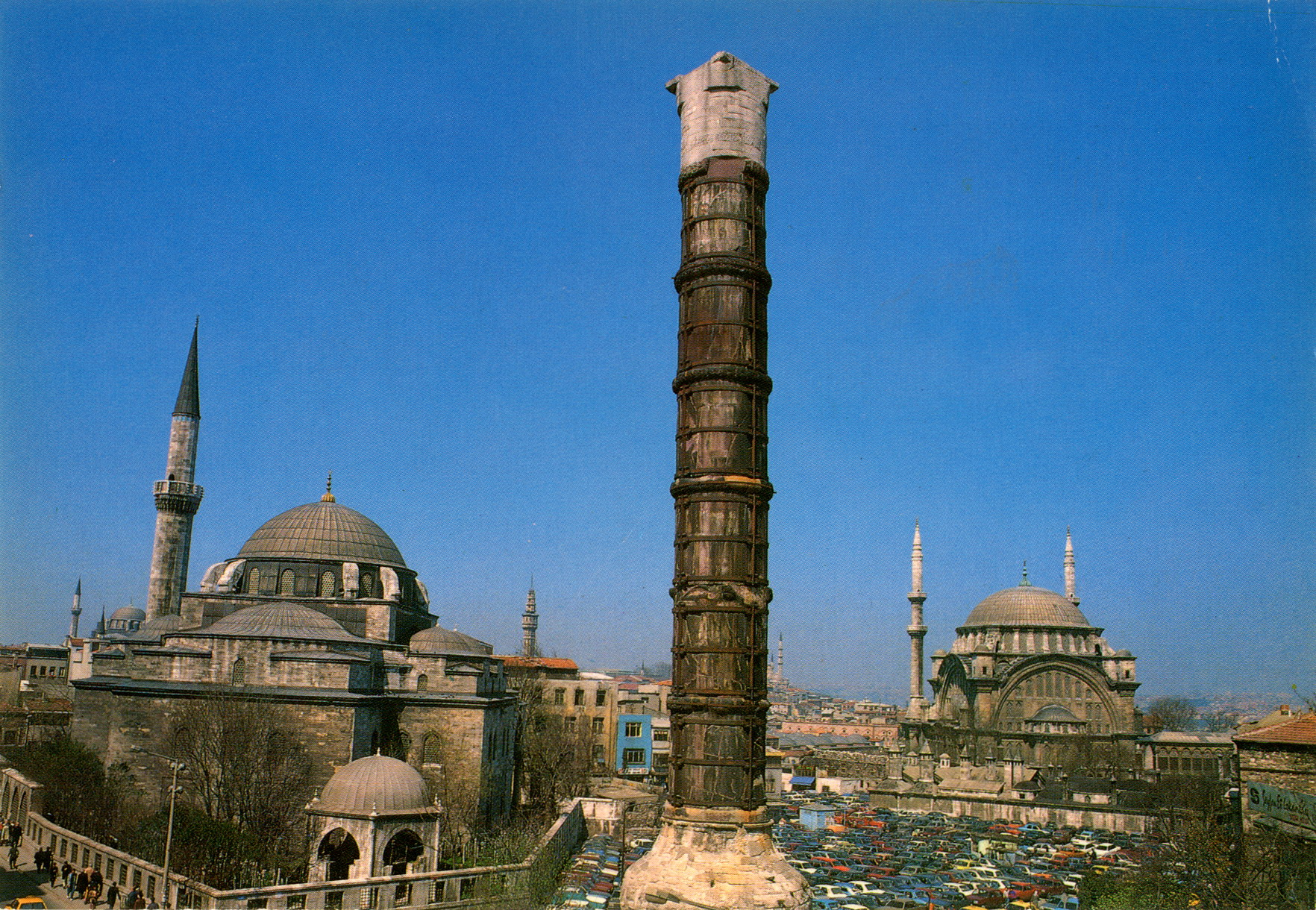
The Column of Constantine

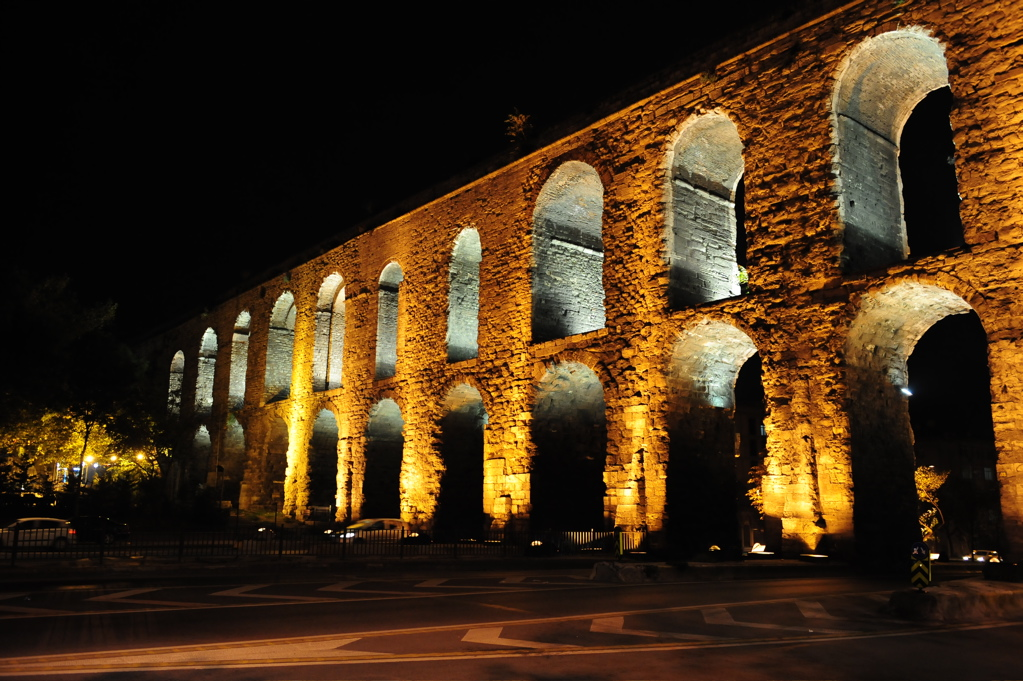
Valens Aqueduct

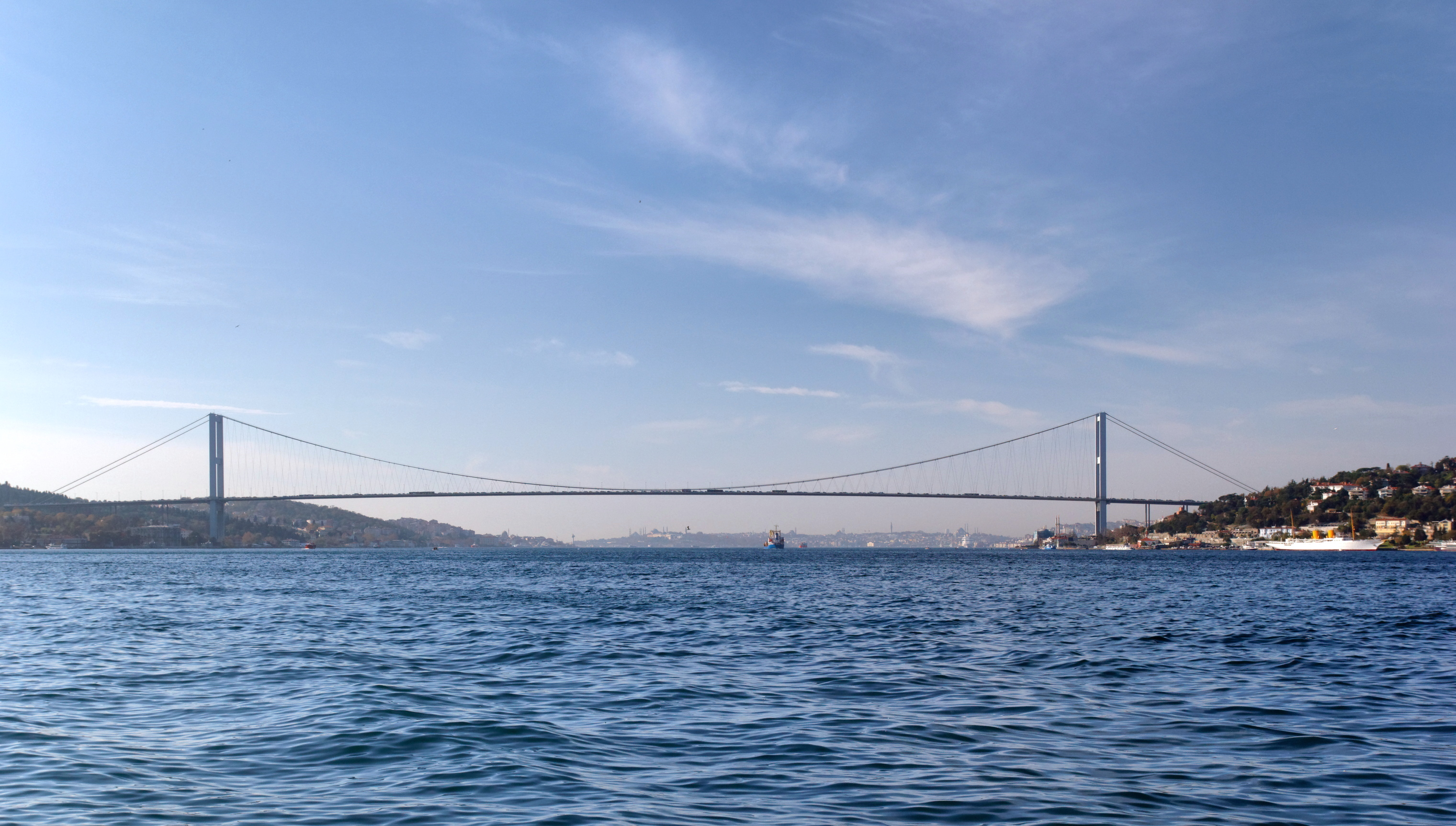
The Bosphorus Bridge

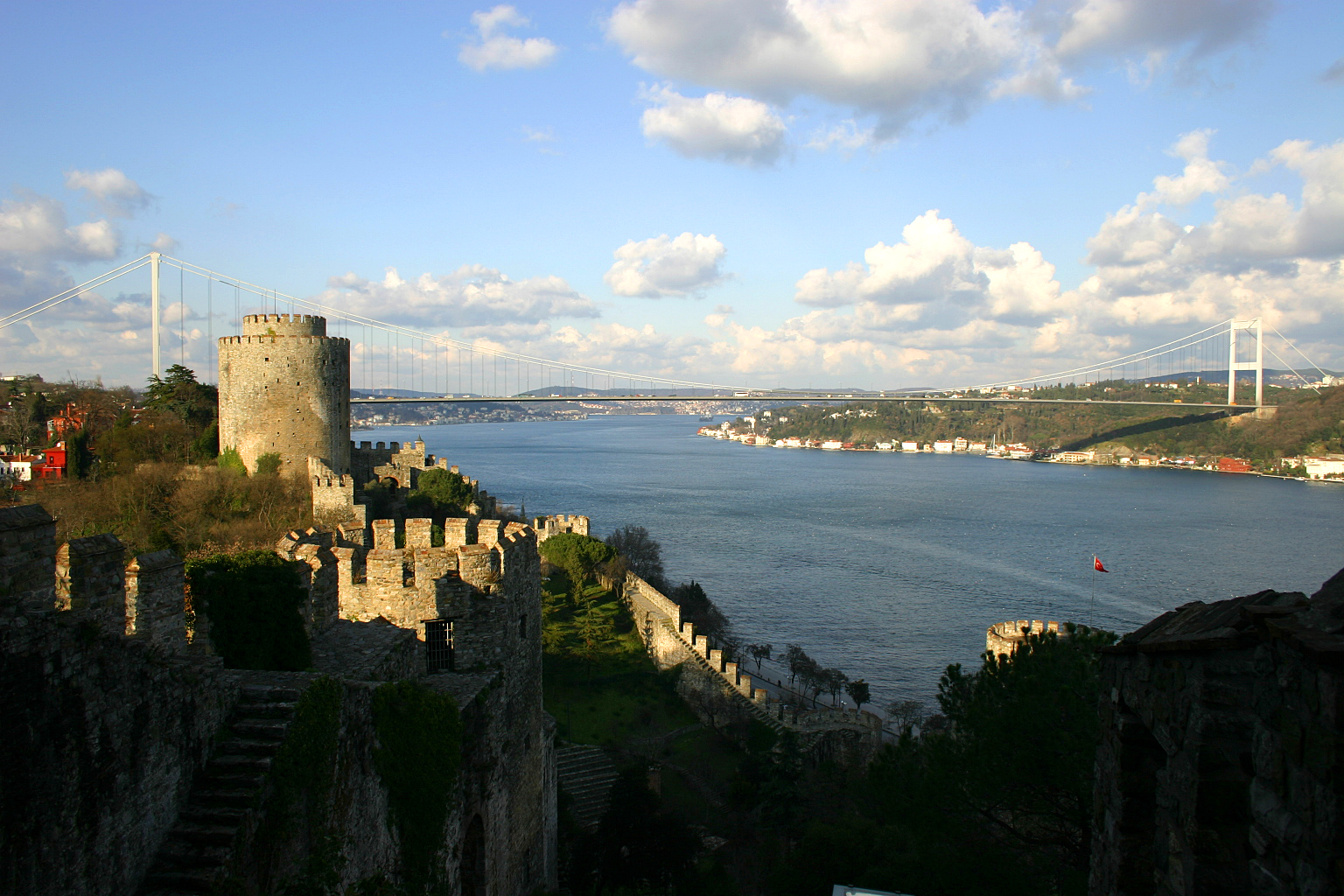
The Fatih Sultan Mehmet Bridge

- Column of Constantine
- Column of Marcian
- Column of the Goths
- Forum of Constantine
- Forum of Theodosius
- Hippodrome of Constantinople
  - Obelisk of Theodosius
  - Serpent Column
  - Walled Obelisk
- Milion
- Aqueduct of Valens
- Walls of Constantinople
  - Golden Horn Wall
  - Propontis Wall
  - Sea Walls
  - Theodosian Walls
  - Walls of Blachernae
  - Wall of Constantine
  - Walls of Galata

==== Bridges in Istanbul ====
- Atatürk Bridge
- Bosphorus Bridge
- Fatih Sultan Mehmet Bridge
- Fil Bridge
- Galata Bridge
- Golden Horn Metro Bridge
- Haliç Bridge
- Yavuz Sultan Selim Bridge

==== Cultural and exhibition centres in Istanbul ====
- Atatürk Cultural Center
- Istanbul Congress Center
- Istanbul Lütfi Kırdar International Convention and Exhibition Center

==== Forts in Istanbul ====
Rumelihisarı

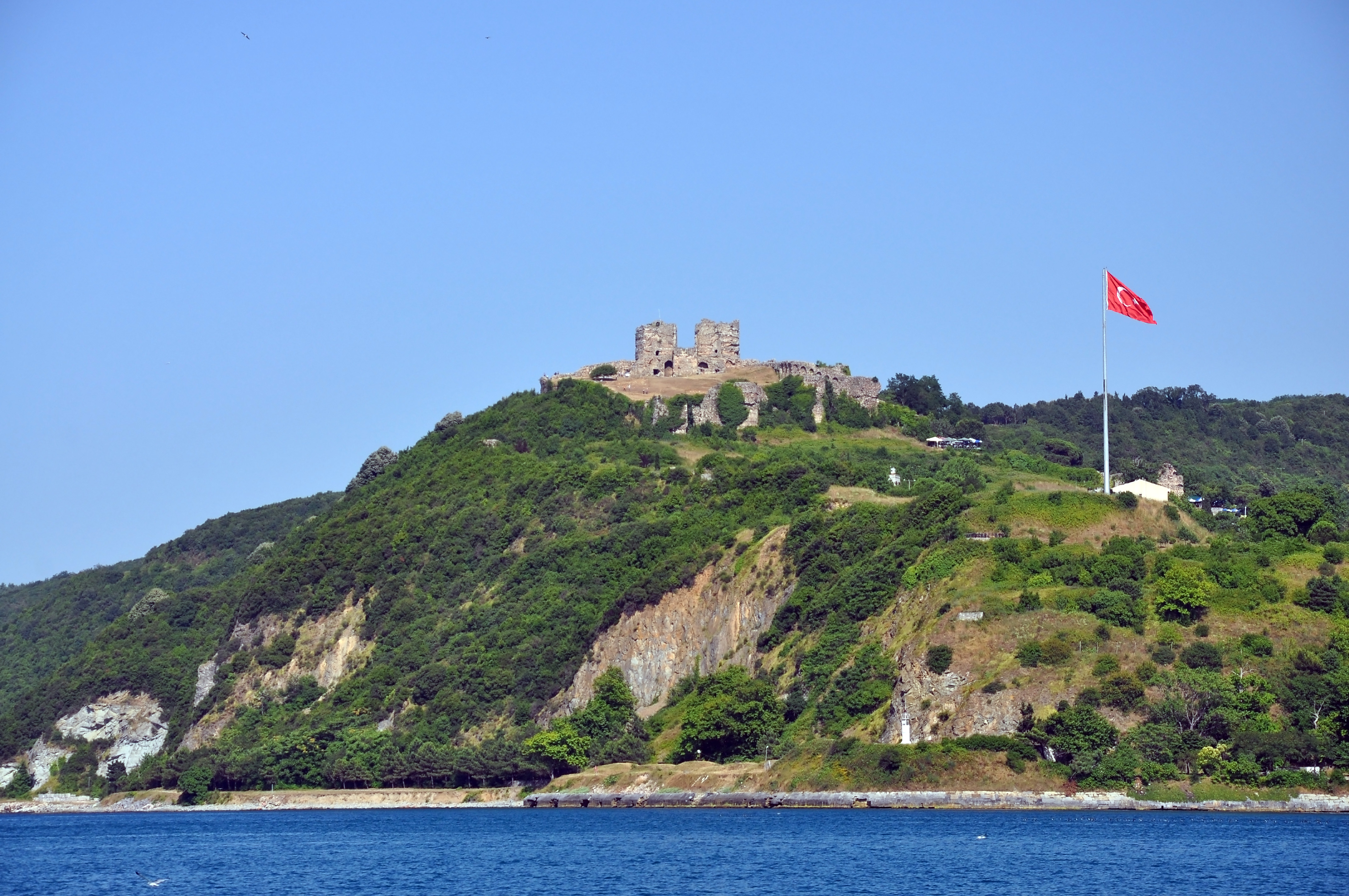
Yoros Castle

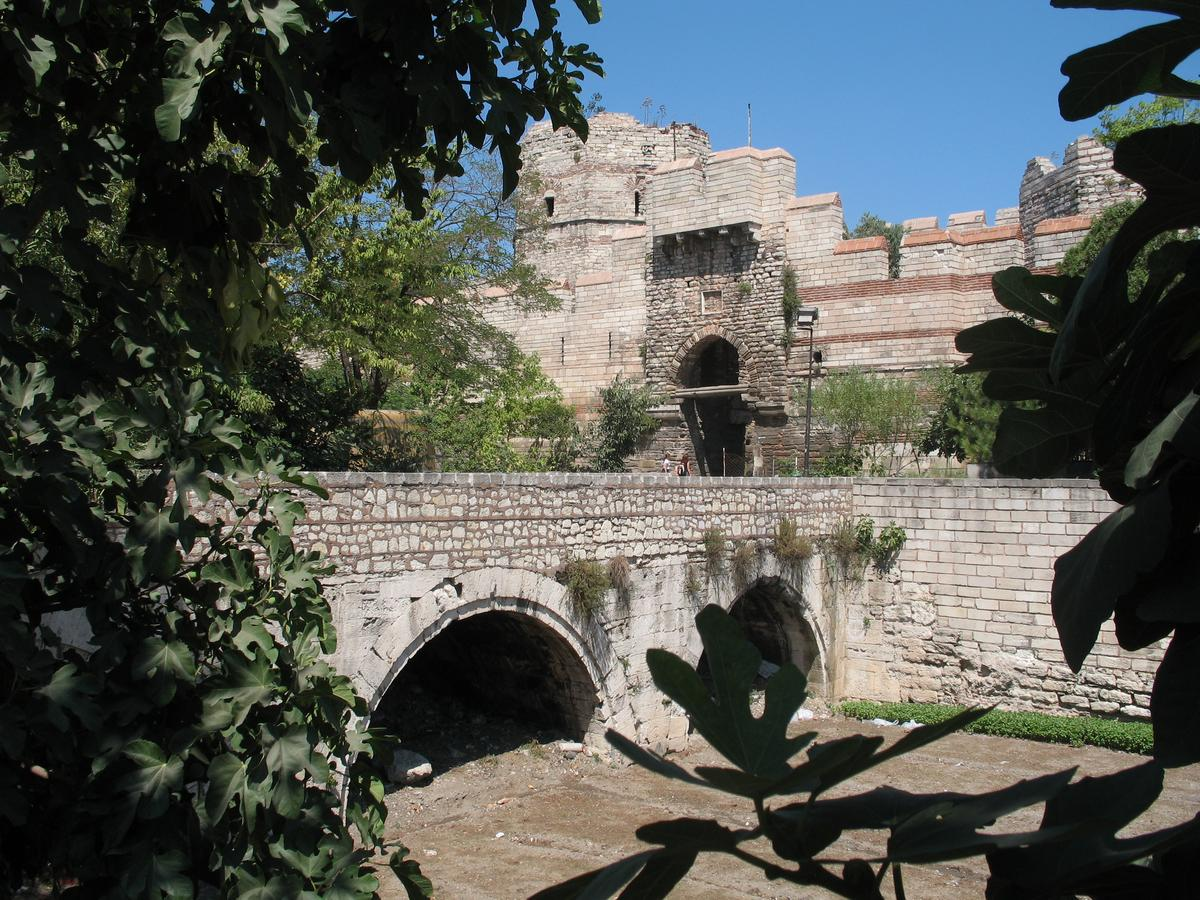
The Gate of the Spring

- Anadoluhisarı
- Rumelihisarı
- Yedikule Fortress
- Yoros Castle

==== Fountains in Istanbul ====
- Fountain of Ahmed III
- Fountain of Ahmed III (Üsküdar)
- German Fountain
- Sultan Mahmut Fountain
- Tophane Fountain

==== Gates in Istanbul ====
Gates of Istanbul

- Gate of Charisius
- Gate of the Spring
- Xylokerkos Gate

==== Lighthouses in Istanbul ====
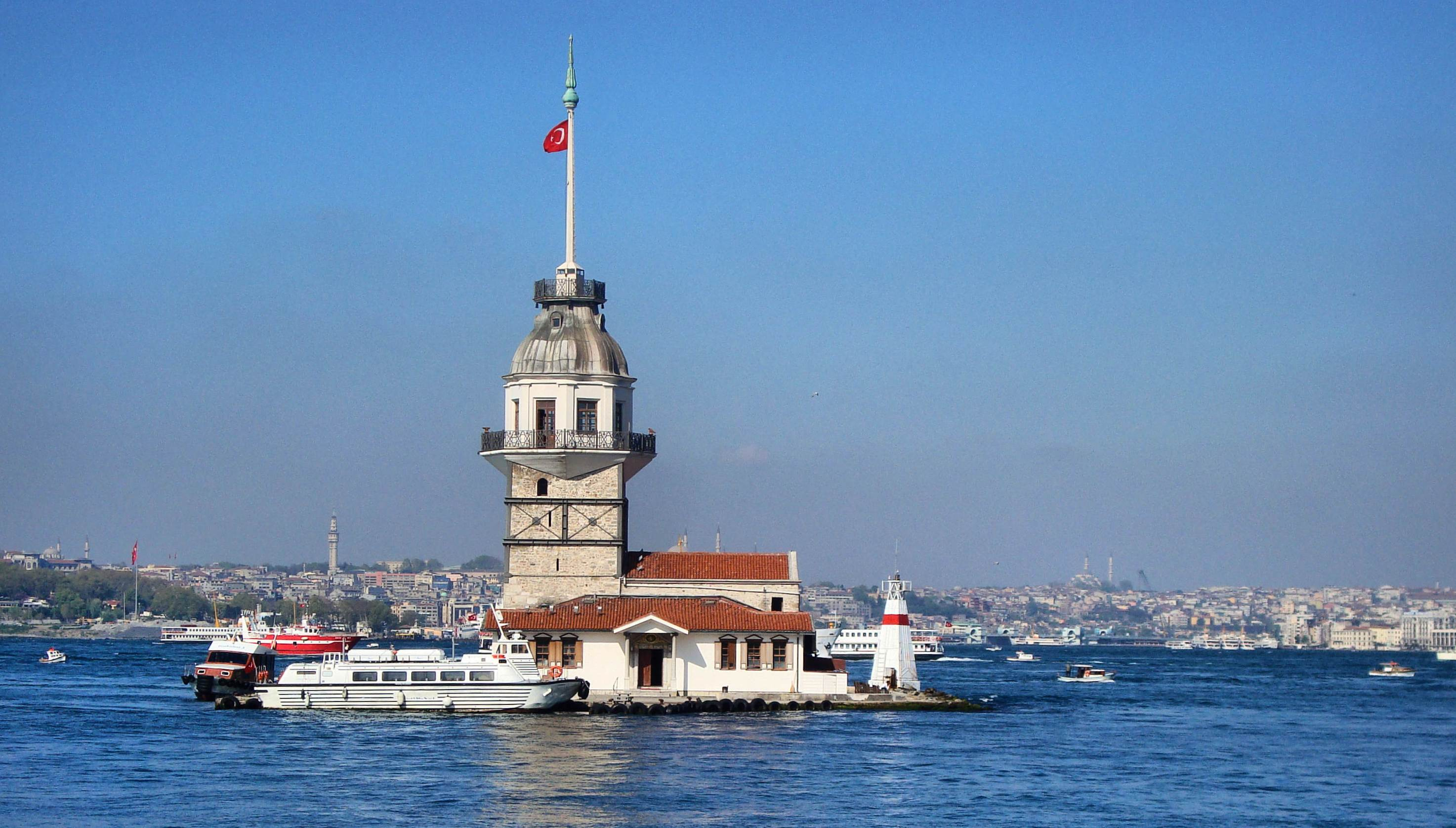
Maiden's Tower

- Ahırkapı Feneri
- Anadolu Feneri
- Fenerbahçe Lighthouse
- Kadıköy İnciburnu Feneri
- Maiden's Tower
- Rumeli Feneri
- Şile Feneri
- Yeşilköy Feneri

==== Monuments and memorials in Istanbul ====
- Aviation Martyrs' Monument
- Ilhan Selçuk and the Enlightenment Instigators of the Republic Monument
- Istanbul Armenian Genocide memorial
- Monument of Liberty
- Republic Monument

==== Museums and art galleries in Istanbul ====
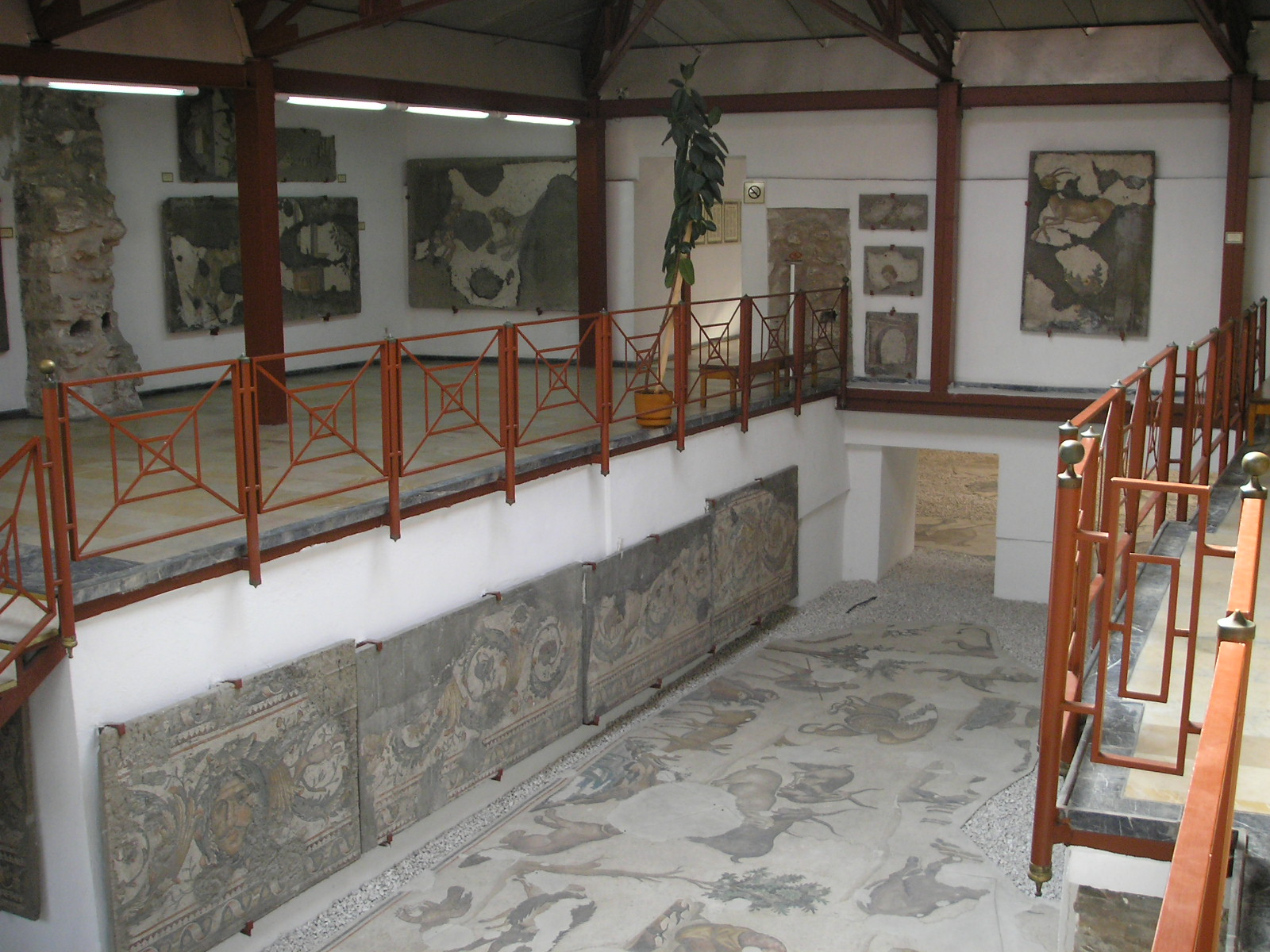
The Great Palace Mosaic Museum

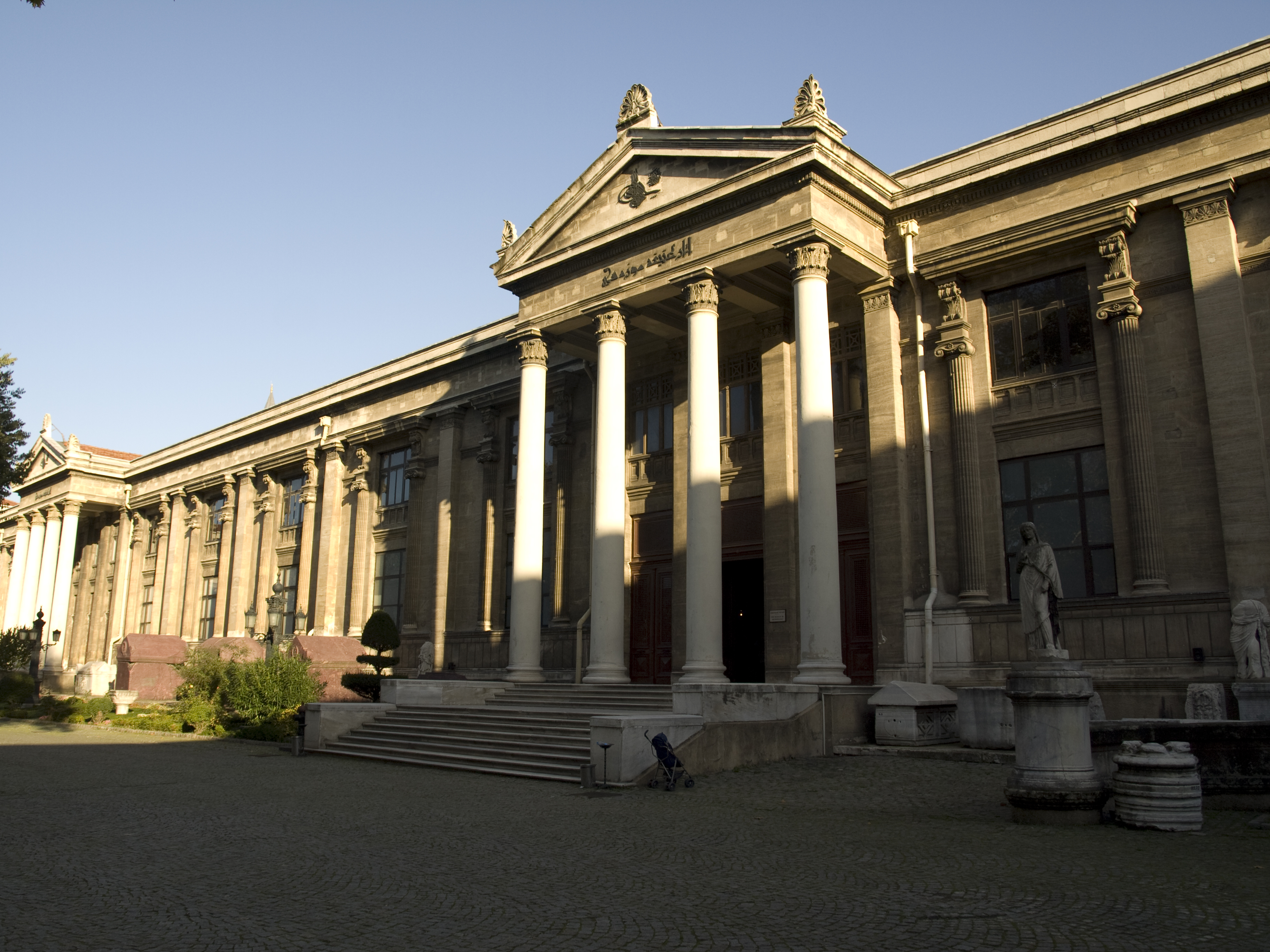
İstanbul Archaeology Museums

Museums in Istanbul

- Ahmet Hamdi Tanpınar Literature Museum Library
- Doğançay Museum
- Galatasaray Museum
- Great Palace Mosaic Museum
- İstanbul Archaeology Museums
- Istanbul Aviation Museum
- Istanbul Contemporary Art Museum
- Istanbul Military Museum
- İstanbul Modern
- Istanbul Naval Museum
- Istanbul Postal Museum
- İstanbul State Art and Sculpture Museum
- İstanbul Toy Museum
- Istanbul Zoology Museum
- Pera Museum
- Sakıp Sabancı Museum
- SantralIstanbul
- Turkish and Islamic Arts Museum

==== Palaces and pavilions in Istanbul ====
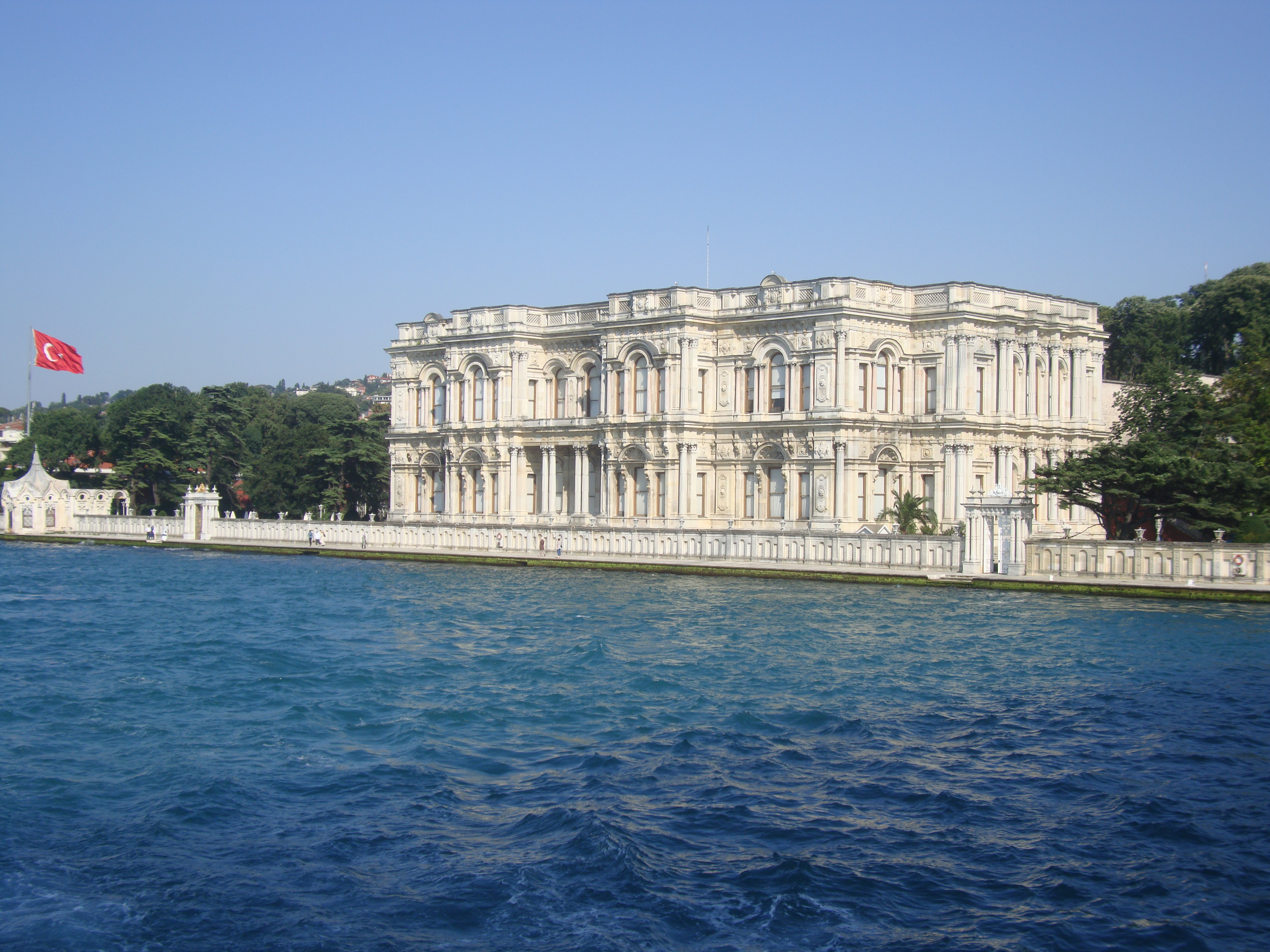
Beylerbeyi Palace

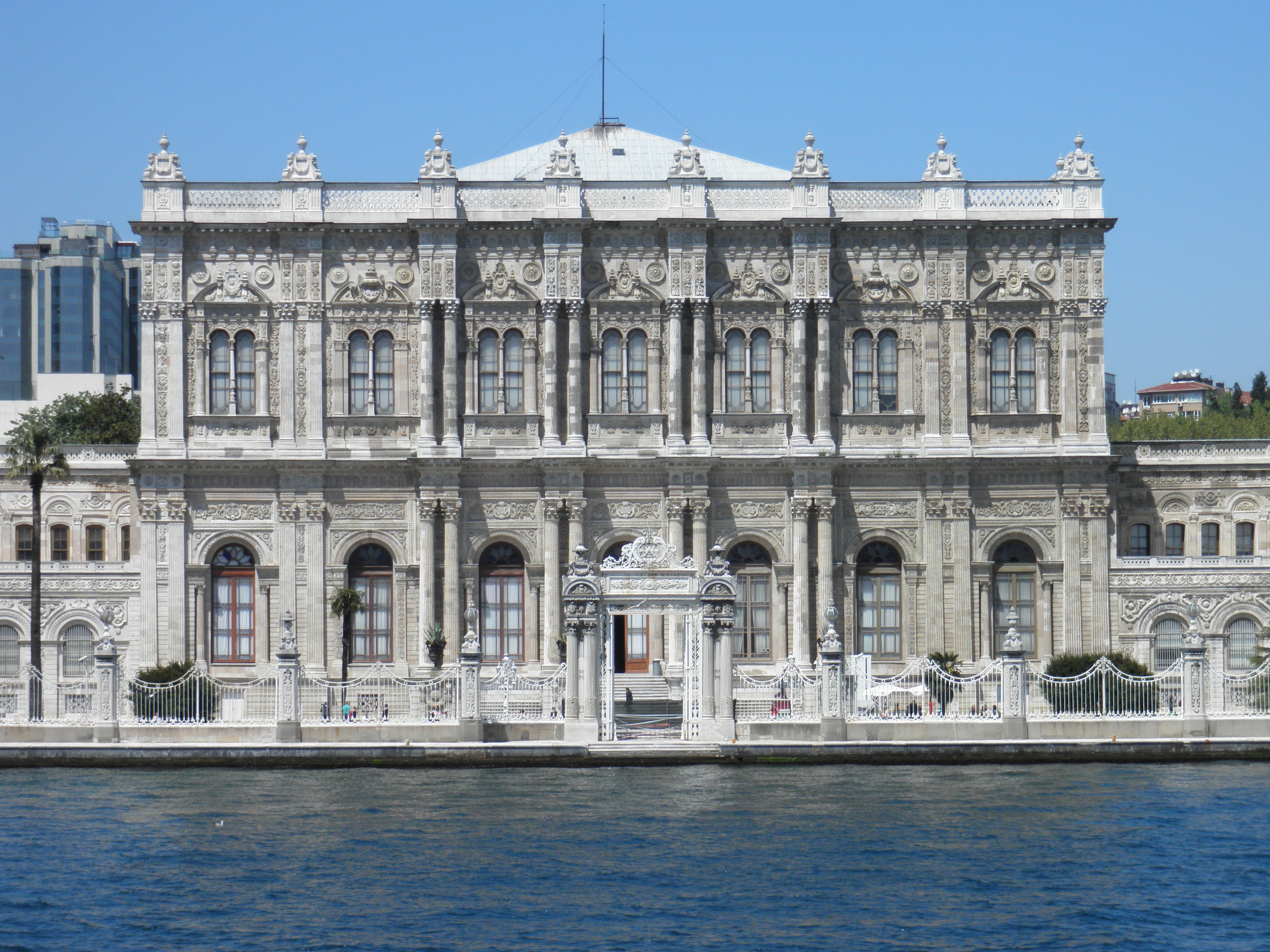
Dolmabahçe Palace

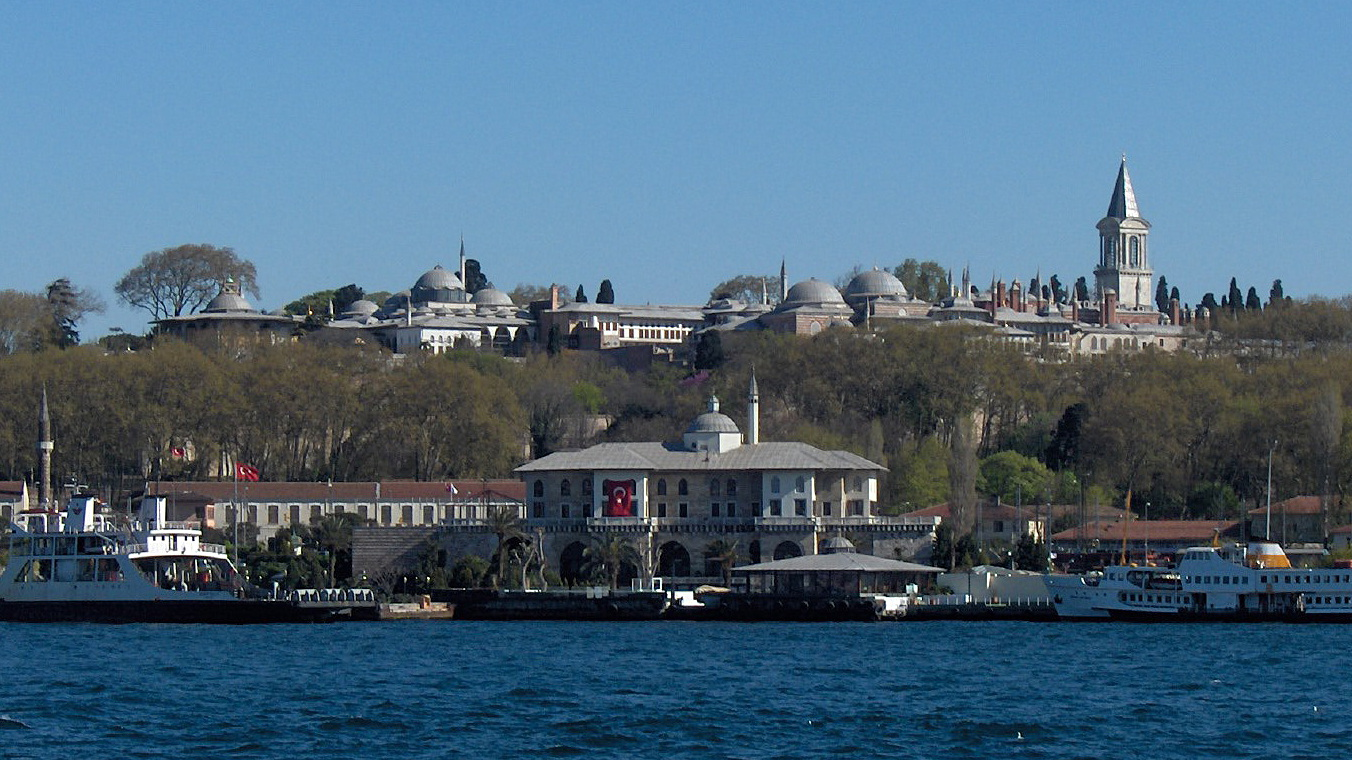
The Topkapı Palace

Ottoman palaces in Istanbul

- Aynalıkavak Pavilion
- Beylerbeyi Palace
- Boukoleon Palace
- Cantemir Palace in Istanbul
- Dolmabahçe Palace
- Esma Sultan Mansion
- Hatice Sultan Mansion
- Ihlamur Pavilion
- Khedive's Palace
- Küçüksu Pavilion
- Maslak Pavilion
- Palace of Antiochos
- Palace of Blachernae
- Palace of the Porphyrogenitus
- Topkapı Palace
  - Tiled Kiosk
- Yıldız Palace
  - Malta Kiosk

==== Parks and gardens in Istanbul ====
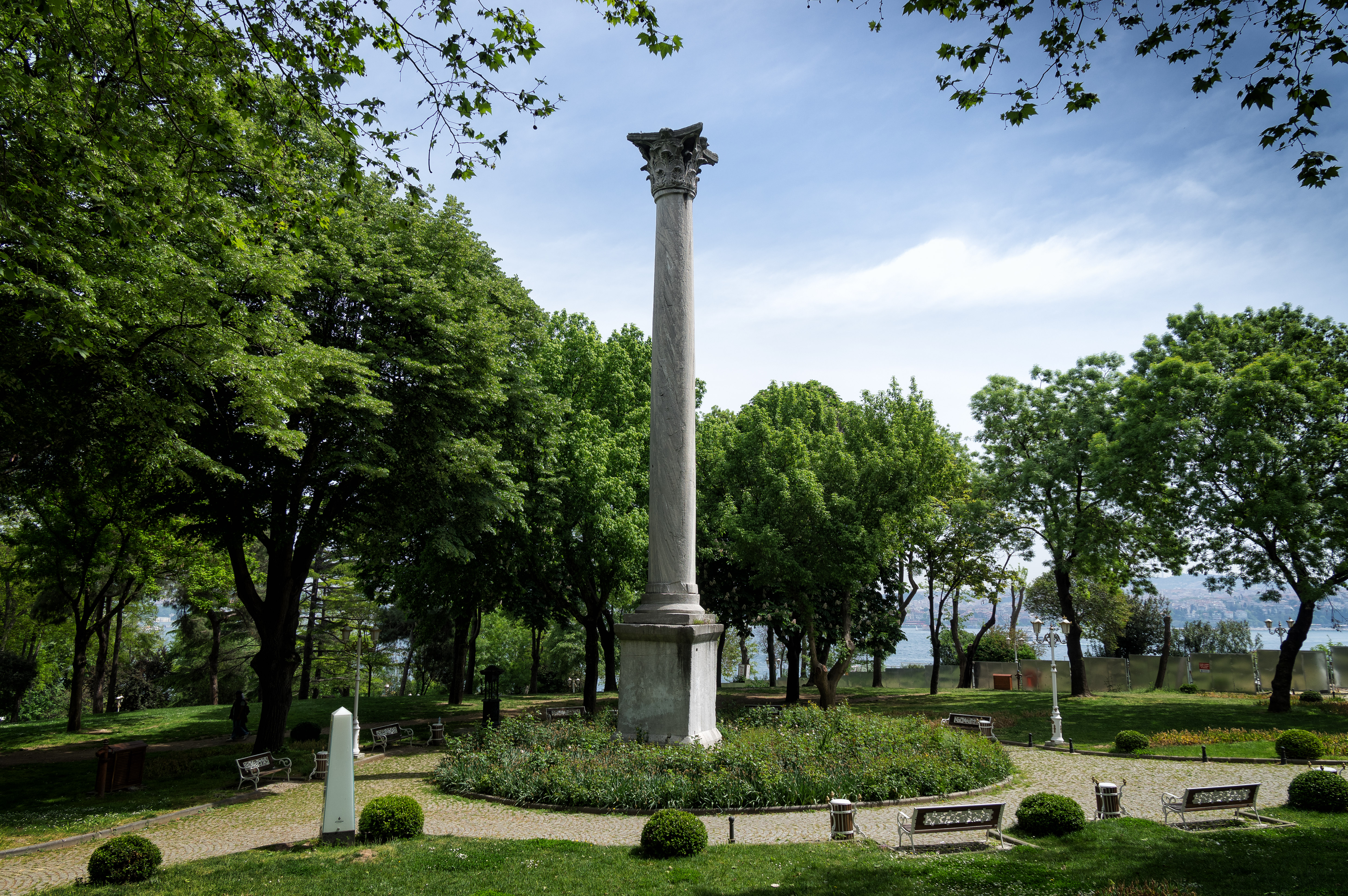
Column of the Goths in Gülhane Park

- Avcıkoru Nature Park
- Belgrad Forest
- Emirgan Park
- Fethi Paşa Korusu
- Gülhane Park
- Kartal Park
- Miniatürk
- Taksim Gezi Park
- Yıldız Park

==== Public squares in Istanbul ====
- Beyazıt Square
- Taksim Square

==== Religious buildings in Istanbul ====
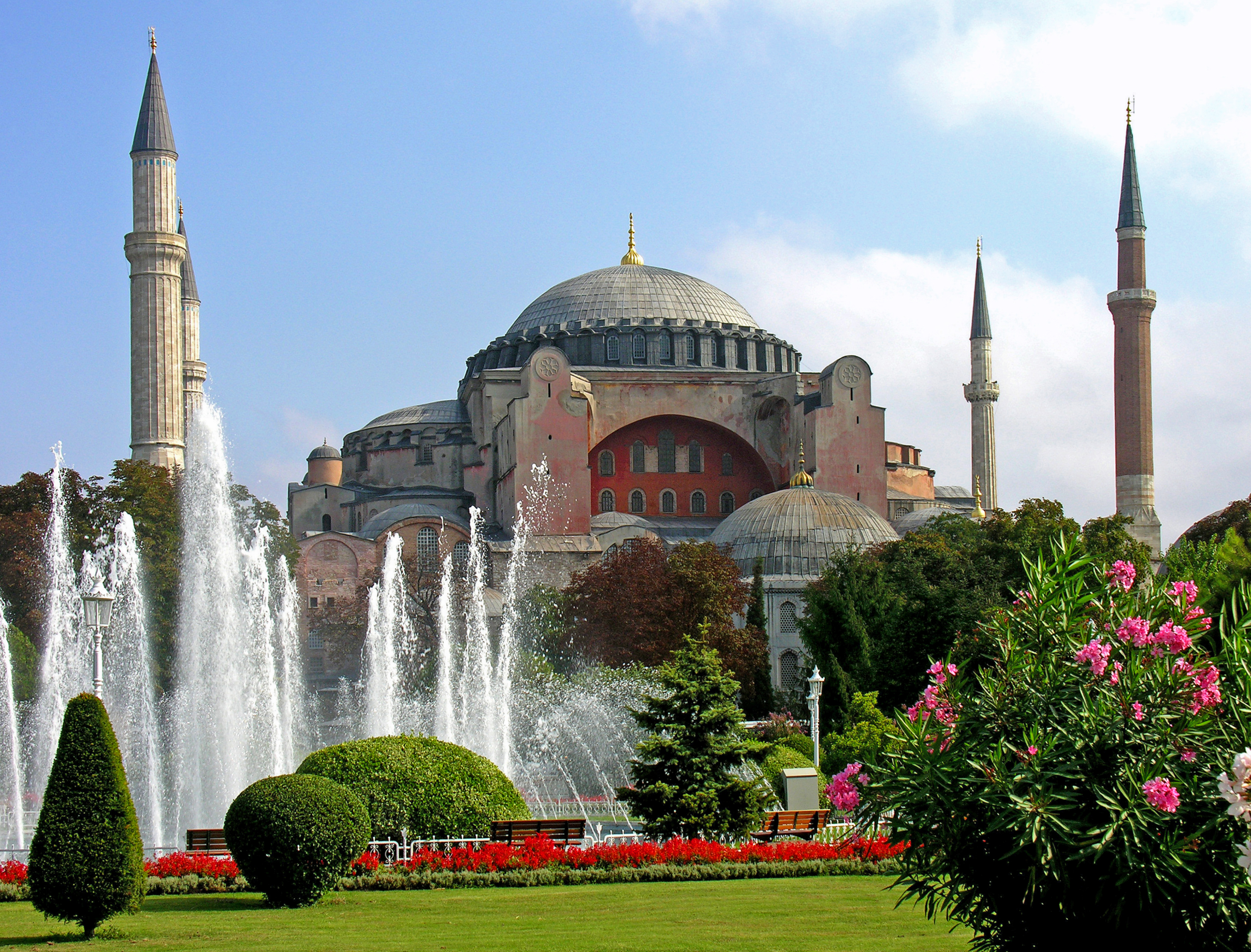
Hagia Sophia

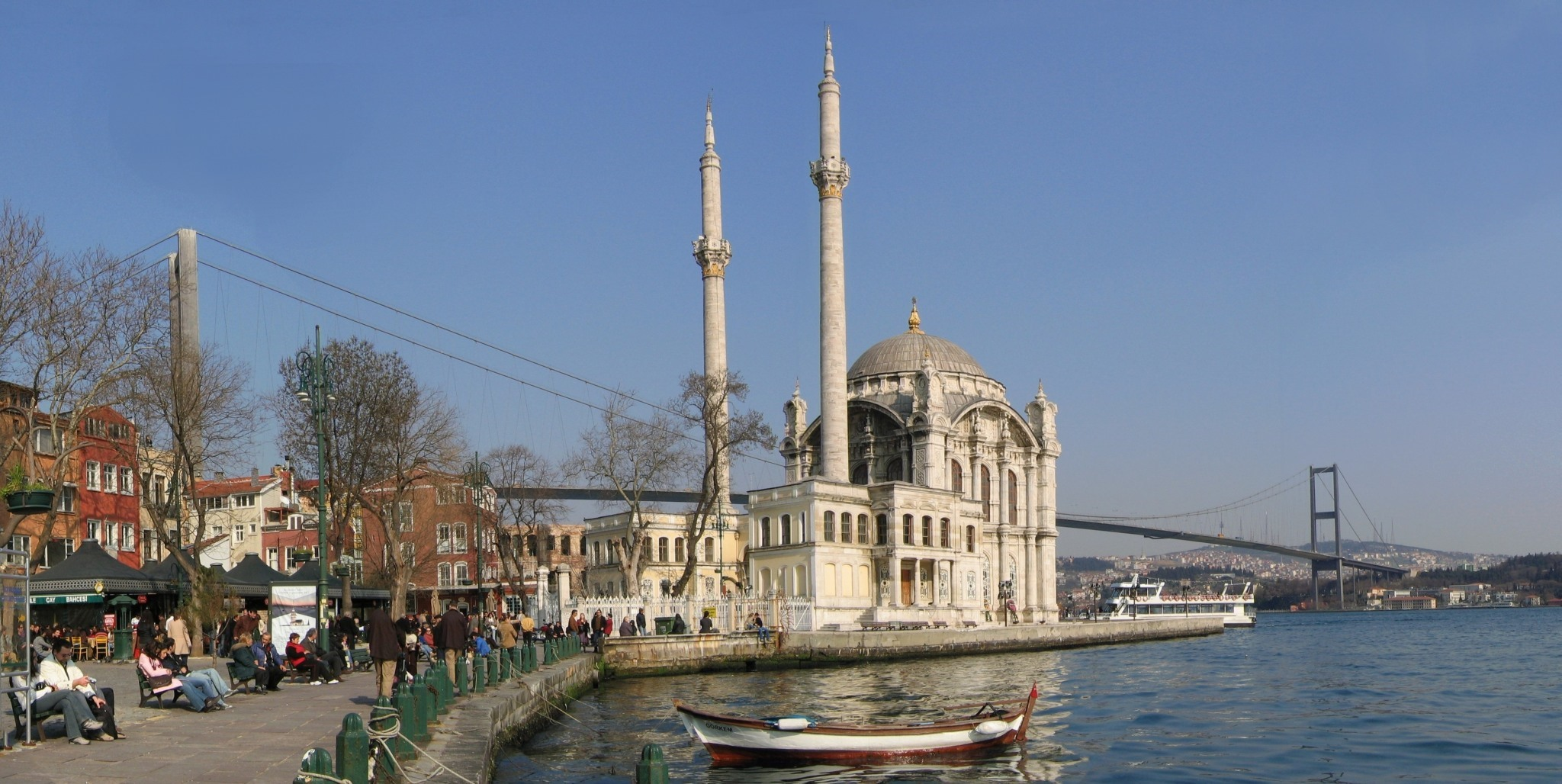
Ortaköy Mosque on the Bosphorus

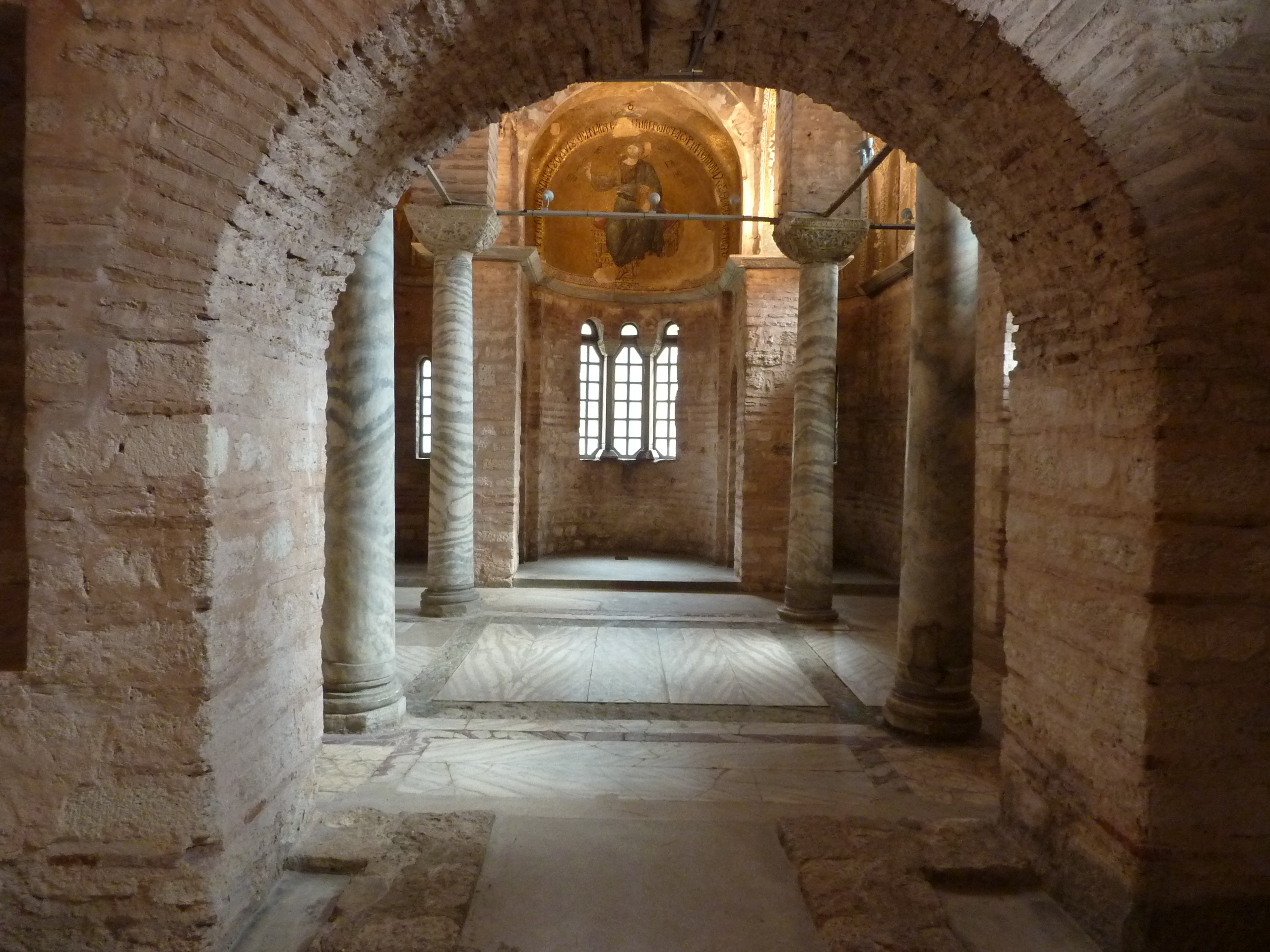
Interior of Pammakaristos Church

Mosques in Istanbul

- Arap Mosque
- Balaban Aga Mosque
- Bayezid II Mosque
- Blue Mosque
- Cathedral of the Holy Spirit
- Chora Church
- Church of St. Anthony of Padua
- Church of Saint Benoit
- Church of St. George of Samatya
- Church of Saint Menas of Samatya
- Eski Imaret Mosque
- Fatih Mosque, Istanbul
- Hagia Irene
- Hagia Sophia
- Hagia Triada Greek Orthodox Church
- Little Hagia Sophia
- Manastır Mosque
- Monastery of Stoudios
- New Mosque
- Nuruosmaniye Mosque
- Ortaköy Mosque
- Pammakaristos Church
- Rüstem Pasha Mosque
- St. George's Cathedral
- Süleymaniye Mosque
- Yavuz Selim Mosque
- Zeyrek Mosque

==== Secular buildings in Istanbul ====
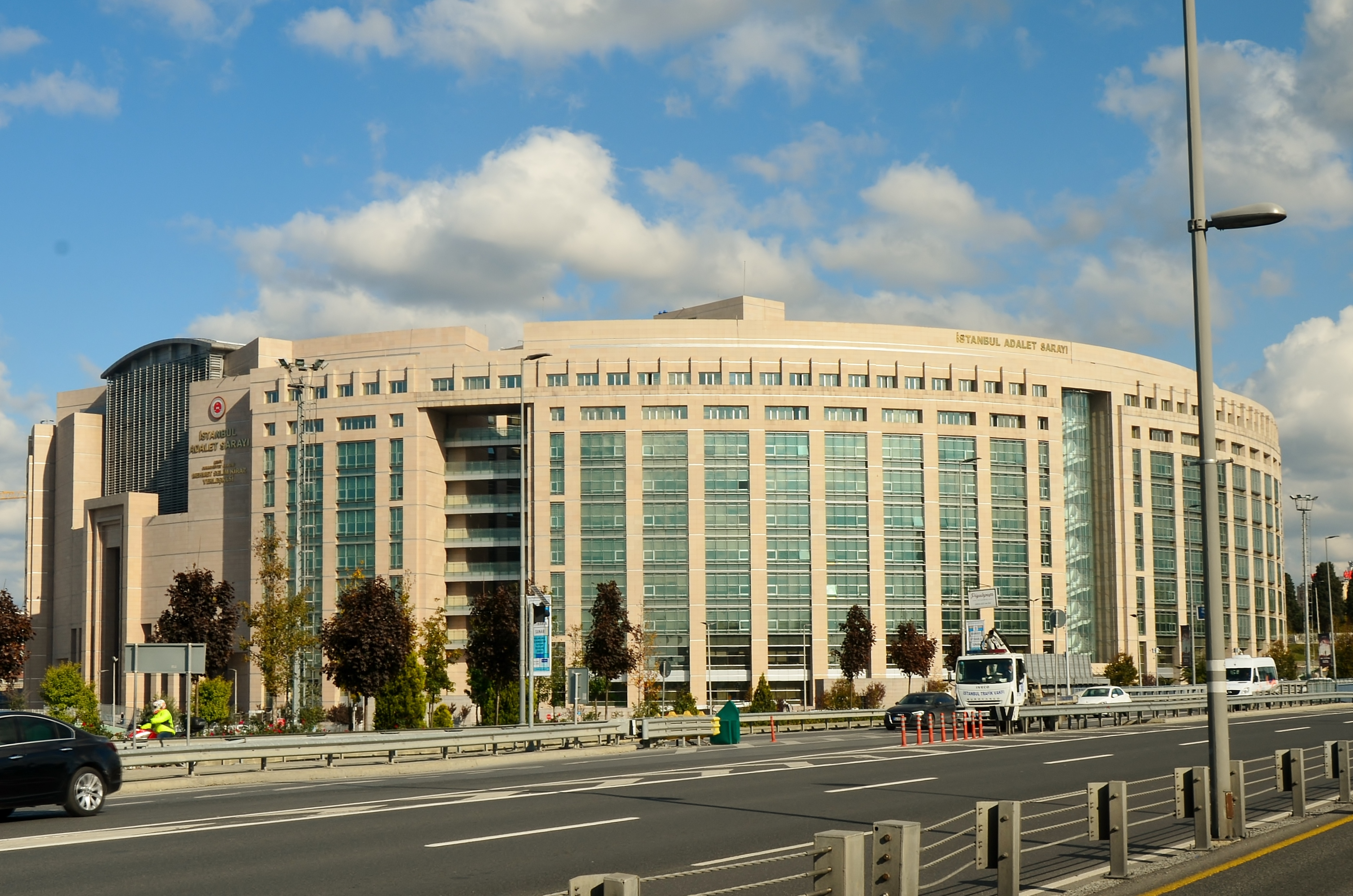
Istanbul Justice Palace

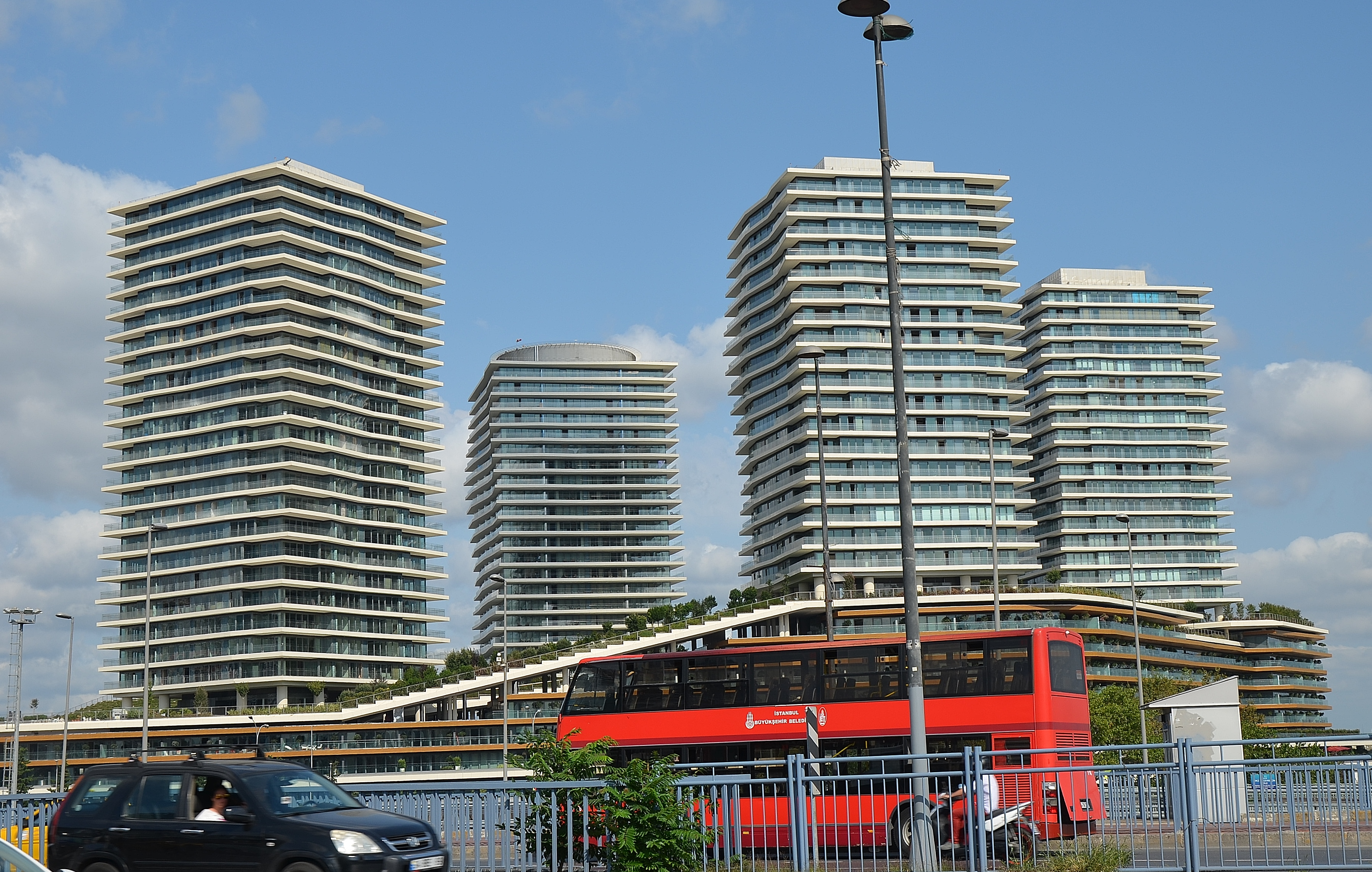
The Zorlu Center

- Basilica Cistern
- Basketmakers' Kiosk
- Caferağa Medrese
- Çiçek Pasajı
- Diamond of Istanbul
- Florya Atatürk Marine Mansion
- Grand Post Office
- Istanbul Aquarium
- Istanbul Justice Palace
- Istanbul Sapphire
- Mısır Apartment
- Sabancı Center
- Süleymaniye Hamam
- World Trade Center Istanbul
- Zorlu Center

==== Streets in Istanbul ====
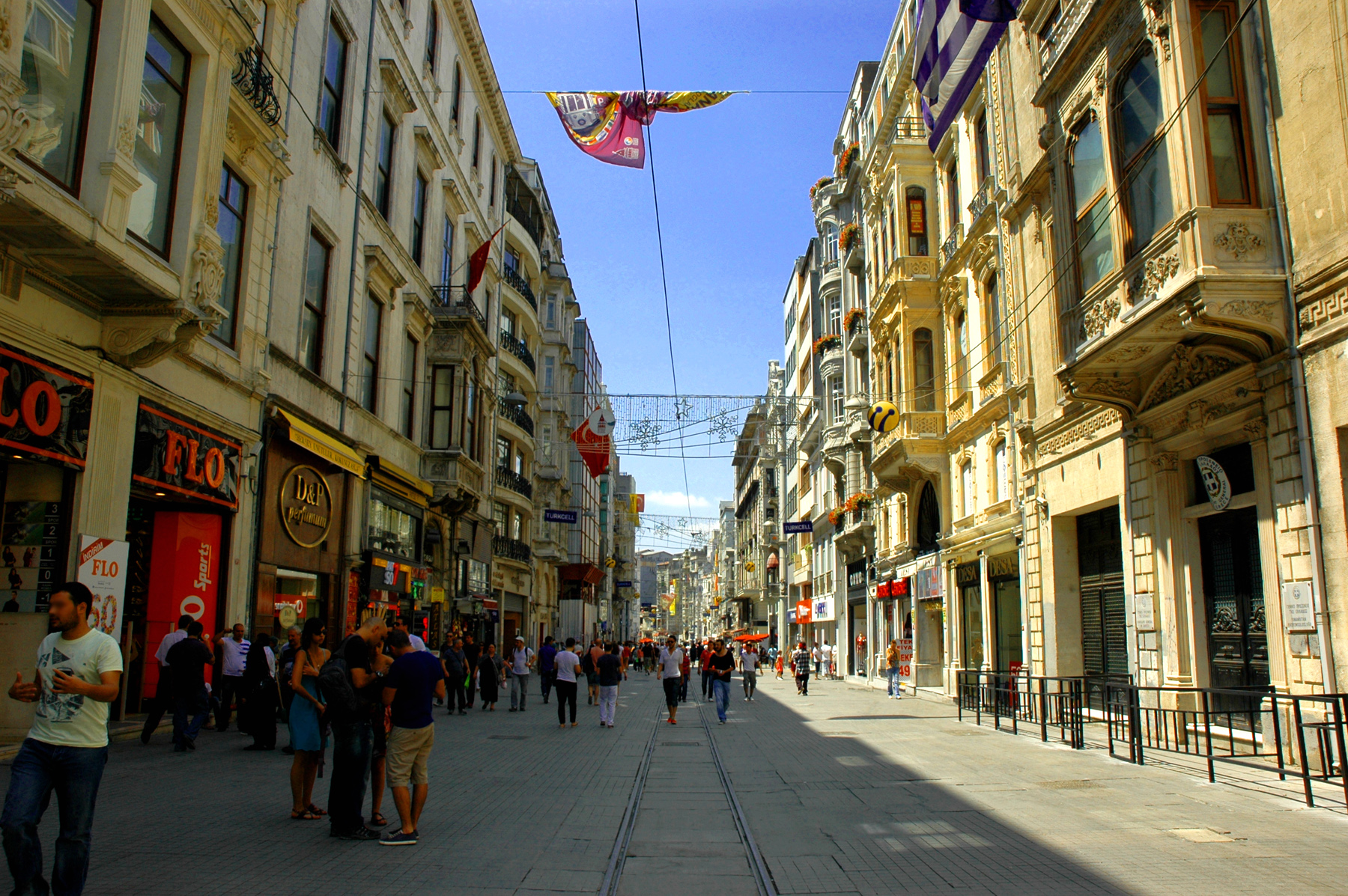
İstiklal Avenue

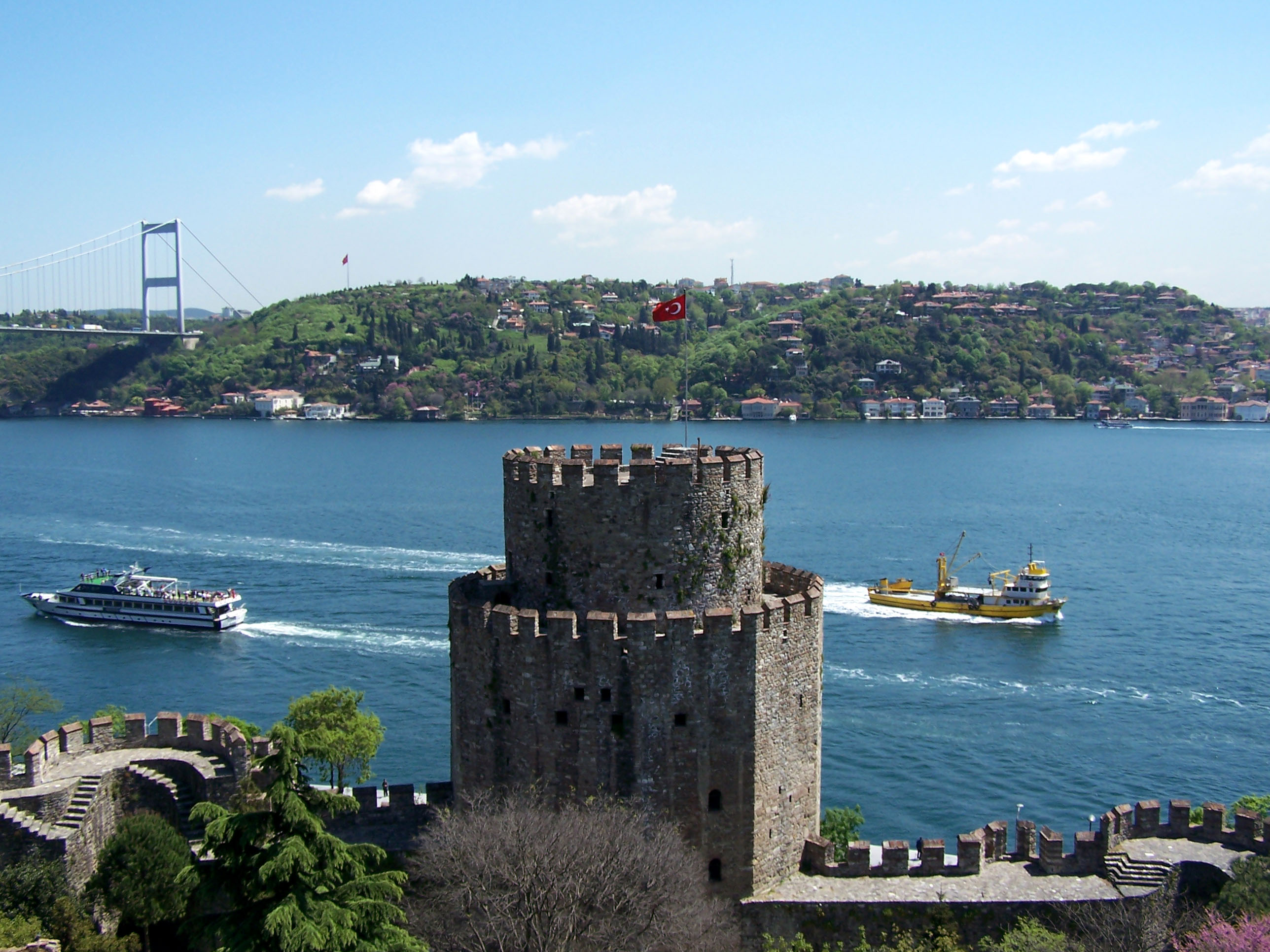
Halil Pasha Tower, Rumelihisarı

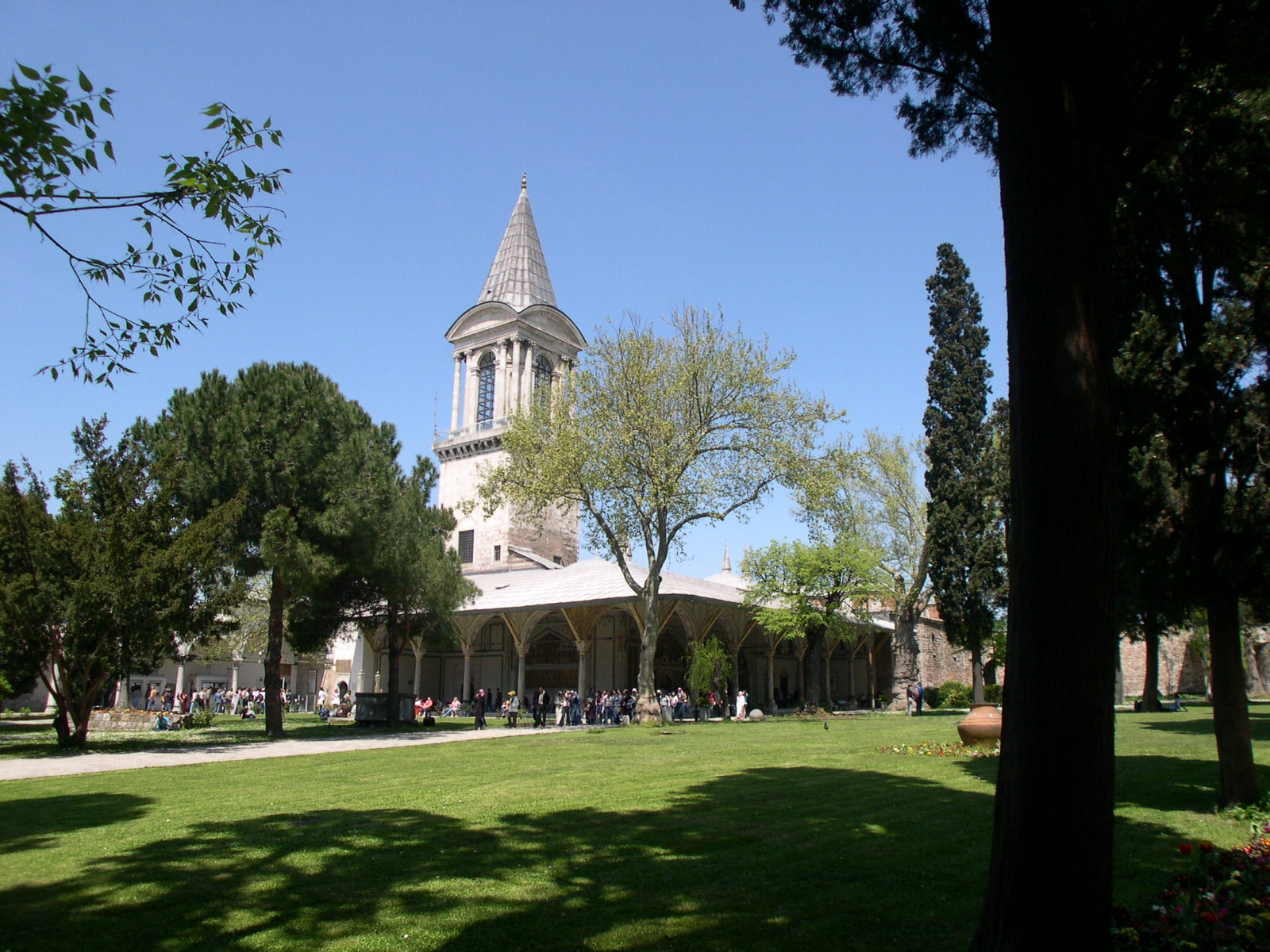
The Tower of Justice at Topkapi Palace

- Abdi İpekçi Street
- Bağdat Avenue
- Bankalar Caddesi
- Barbaros Boulevard
- Büyükdere Avenue
- İstiklal Avenue
- Kennedy Avenue
- Soğukçeşme Sokağı

==== Theatres in Istanbul ====
- Bahçeşehir Muhsin Ertuğrul Theatre
- Cemil Topuzlu Open-Air Theatre
- Istanbul City Theatres
- Kadıköy Haldun Taner Stage
- Naum Theatre
- Sabancı Performing Arts Center

==== Towers in Istanbul ====
Towers in Istanbul

- Beyazıt Tower
- Çamlıca TRT Television Tower
- Çamlıca Tower
- Dolmabahçe Clock Tower
- Etfal Hospital Clock Tower
- Galata Tower
- Nusretiye Clock Tower
- Yıldız Clock Tower

=== Demographics of Istanbul ===
Demographics of Istanbul

== Government and politics of Istanbul ==
Politics of Istanbul

- Mayor of Istanbul
- International relations of Istanbul
  - Twin towns and sister cities of Istanbul

=== Law and order in Istanbul ===
- Law enforcement in Istanbul
  - Turkish National Police
    - Istanbul Chief of Police

== History of Istanbul ==
History of Istanbul

=== History of Istanbul, by period or event ===
Timeline of Istanbul

- Prehistory and origin of Istanbul
- Byzantium
  - The history of the city proper begins when Greek settlers from Megara establish Byzantium on the European side of the Bosphorus (660 BC)
  - Byzantium officially becomes a part of the Roman Empire (73 AD)

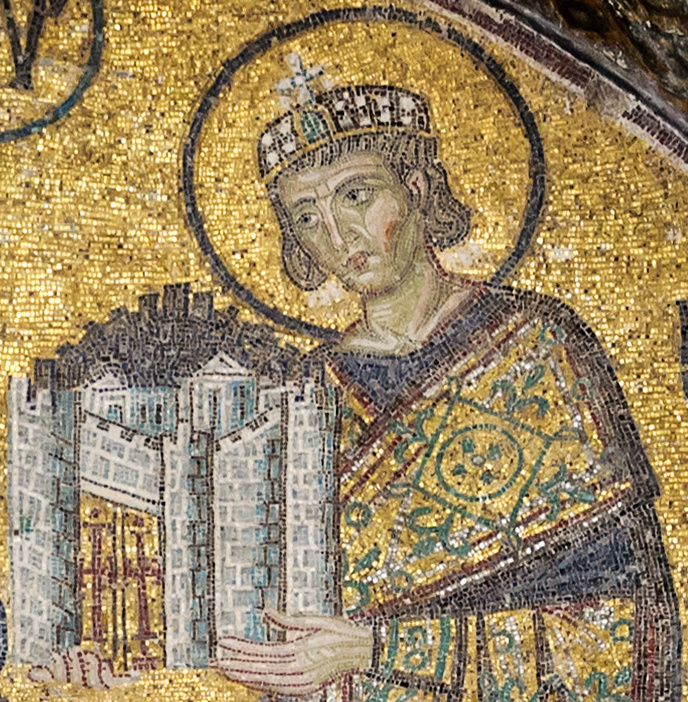
Emperor Constantine I presents a representation of the city of Constantinople. Church mosaic in Hagia Sophia, c. 1000.

- Constantinople
  - Foundation of Constantinople (324)
    - Constantinople is reinaugurated in 324 from ancient Byzantium by Emperor Constantine the Great, after whom it was named, and becomes the capital of the Roman Empire (11 May 330)
  - Fall of Constantinople (1453)
    - Mehmed the Conqueror captures Constantinople and declares it the new capital of the Ottoman Empire (29 May 1453)
  - Constantinople during the Ottoman era (1453–1922)
    - Suleiman the Magnificent's reign from 1520 to 1566 is a period of great artistic and architectural achievements
  - Constantinople during World War I
    - Occupation of Istanbul by Allied forces (13 November 1918 – 4 October 1923)
- Modern Istanbul (1923–present)
  - Turkish forces enter the city in a ceremony which marks the 'Liberation Day of Istanbul' (6 October 1923)
  - The capital is moved from Istanbul to Ankara (1923)
  - The international name Constantinople remains in use until Turkey adapts the Latin alphabet (1928)

=== History of Istanbul, by subject ===
- Battle of Constantinople (378)
- Istanbul pogrom

== Culture of Istanbul ==
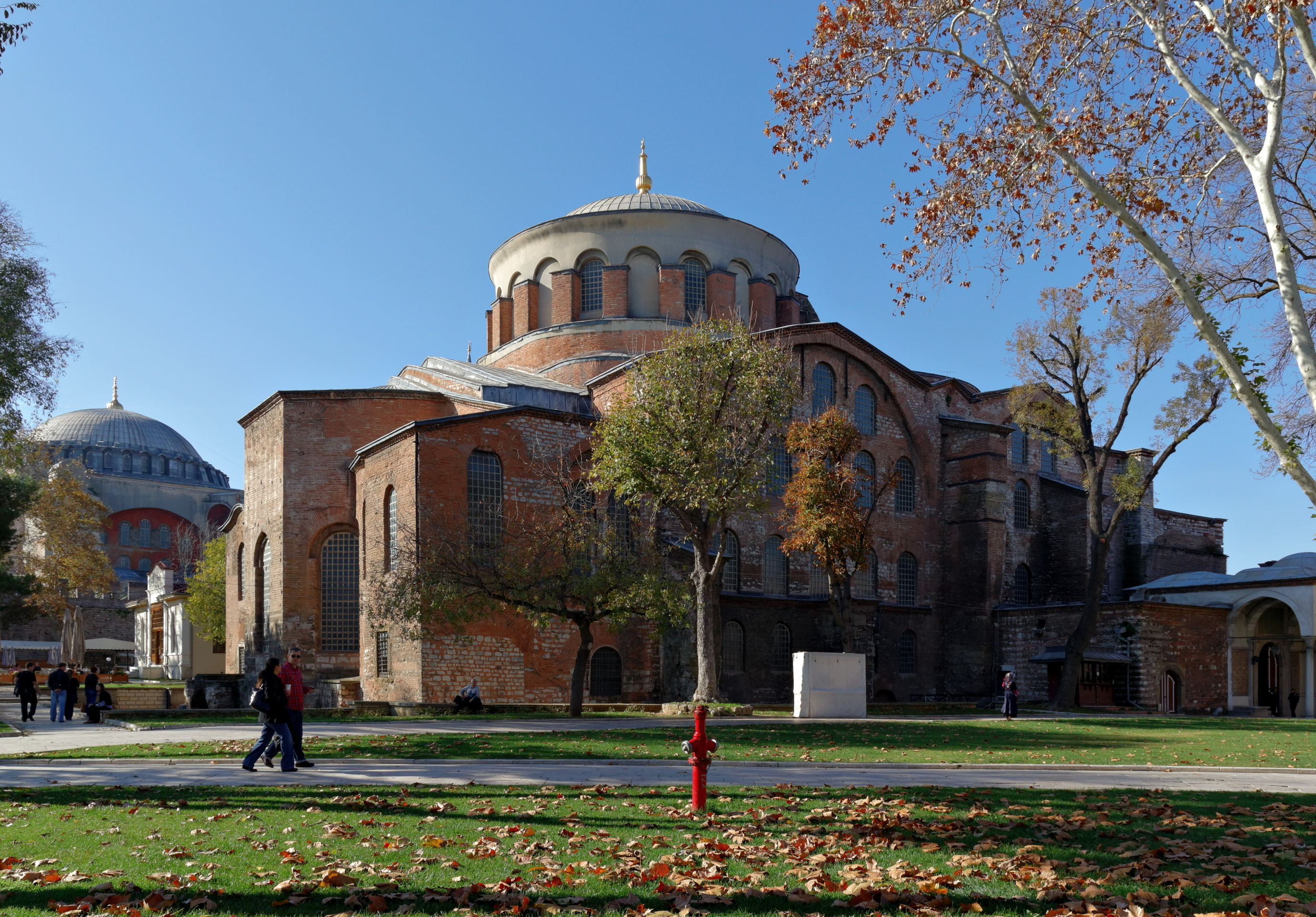
Hagia Irene, the first Byzantine style church built in Constantinople

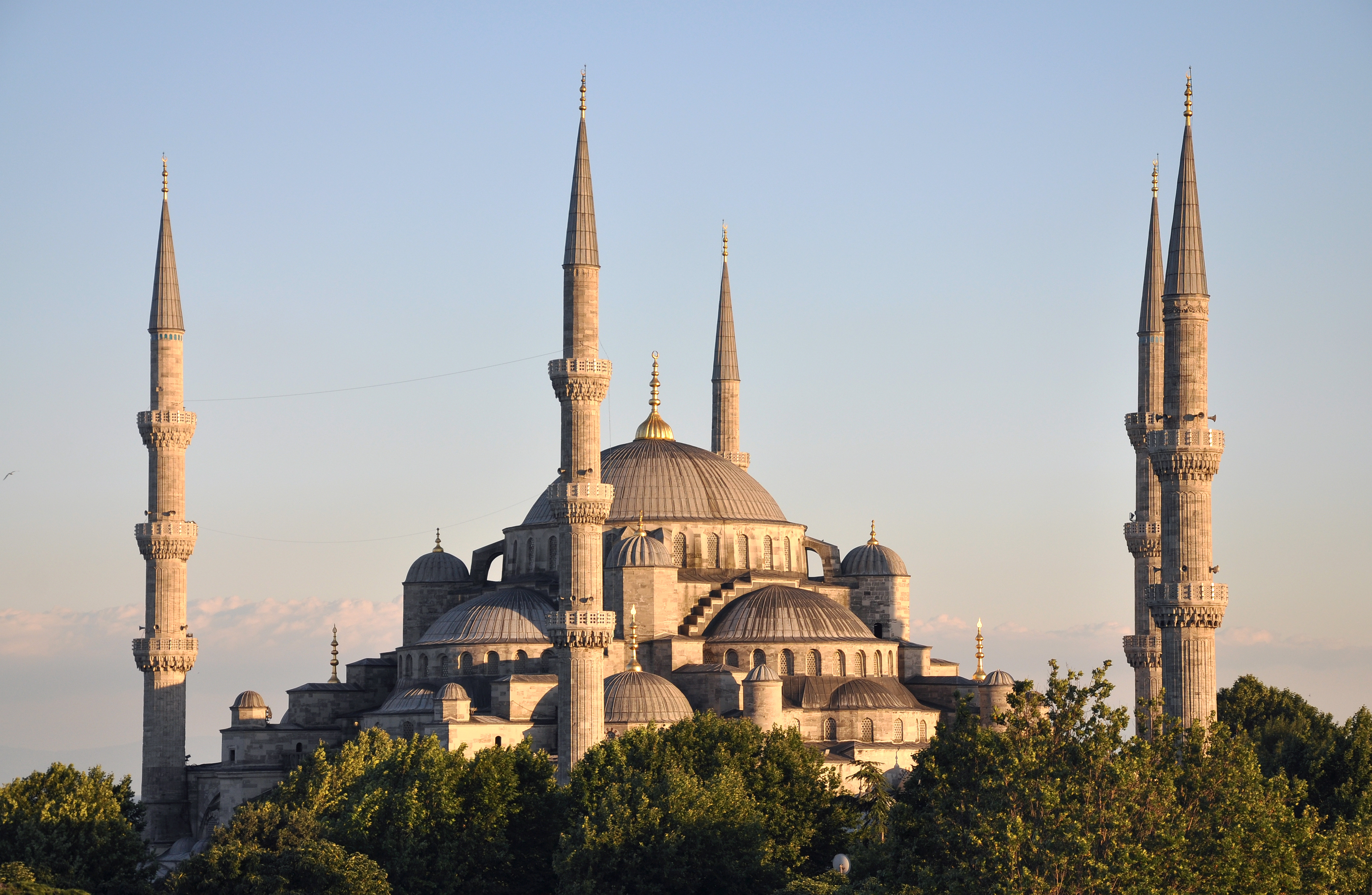
The Blue Mosque, an example of the Classical period of Ottoman architecture

Culture of Istanbul

=== Arts in Istanbul ===
==== Architecture of Istanbul ====
Architecture of Istanbul

- Buildings in Istanbul
  - Byzantine monuments in Istanbul
  - Tallest buildings in Istanbul

==== Music of Istanbul ====
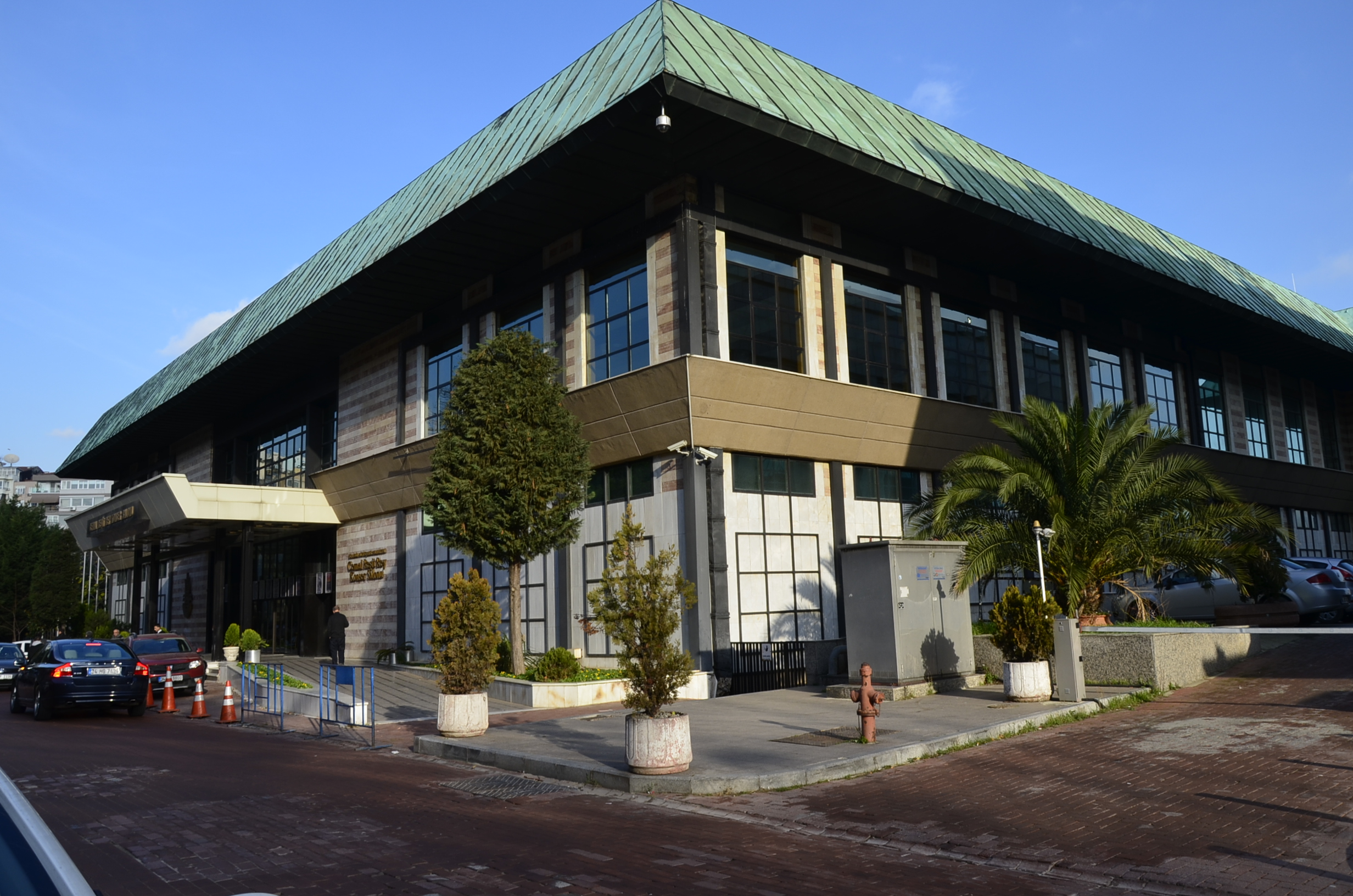
Cemal Reşit Rey Concert Hall

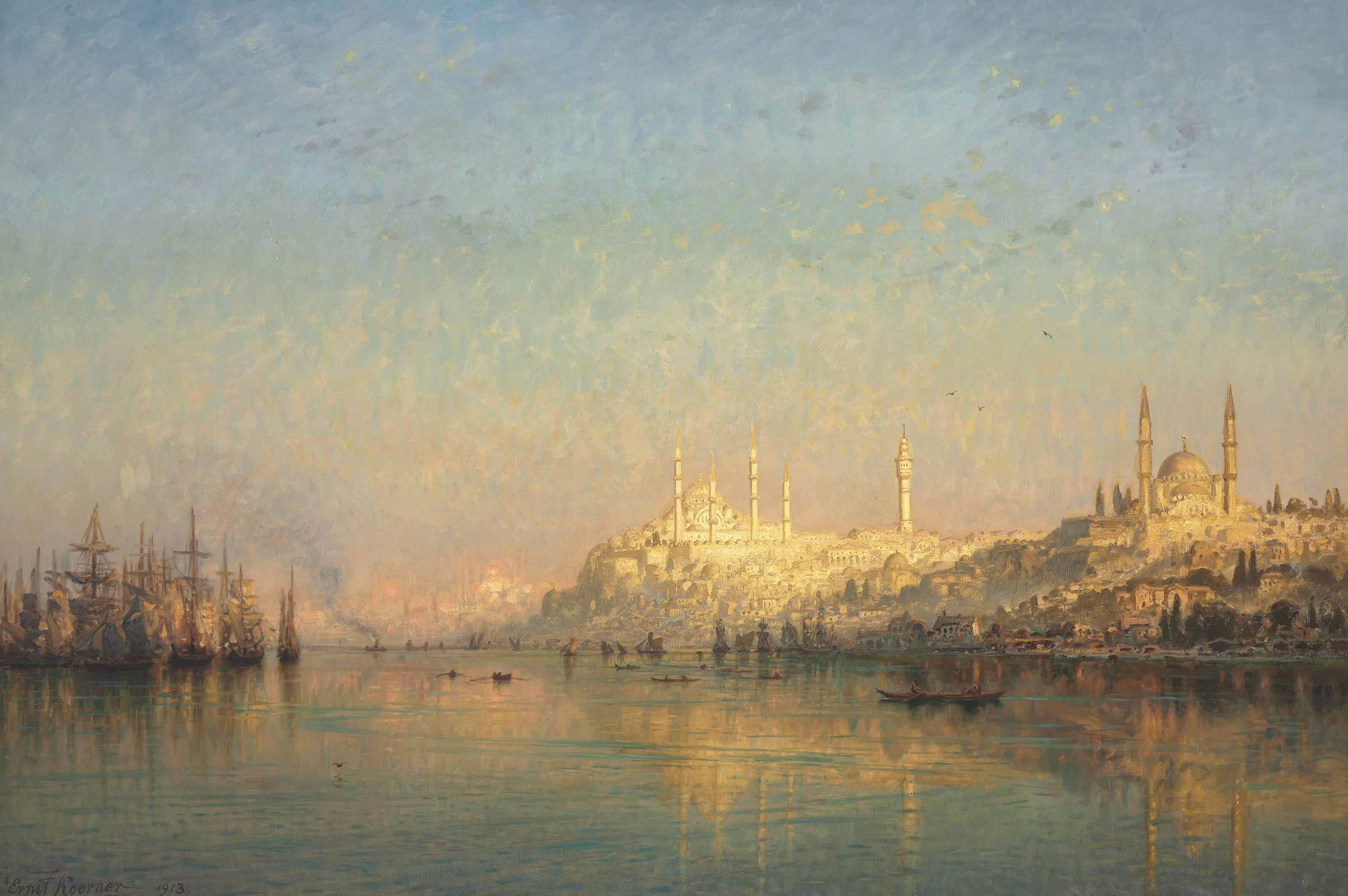
Istanbul in art: View Across the Golden Horn, Hagia Sophia and the Blue Mosque beyond, Constantinople by Ernst Koerner, 1913

- Music festivals and competitions in Istanbul
  - Istanbul International Jazz Festival
  - Istanbul International Music Festival
- Music schools in Istanbul
  - Istanbul University State Conservatory
- Music venues in Istanbul
  - Cemal Reşit Rey Concert Hall
  - Süreyya Opera House
  - Zorlu PSM
- Musical ensembles in Istanbul
  - Borusan Istanbul Philharmonic Orchestra
  - Istanbul State Symphony Orchestra
- Musicians from Istanbul
  - Necil Kazım Akses
  - Hasan Ferit Alnar
  - Ulvi Cemal Erkin
- Songs about Istanbul
  - Istanbul (Not Constantinople)

==== Visual arts of Istanbul ====
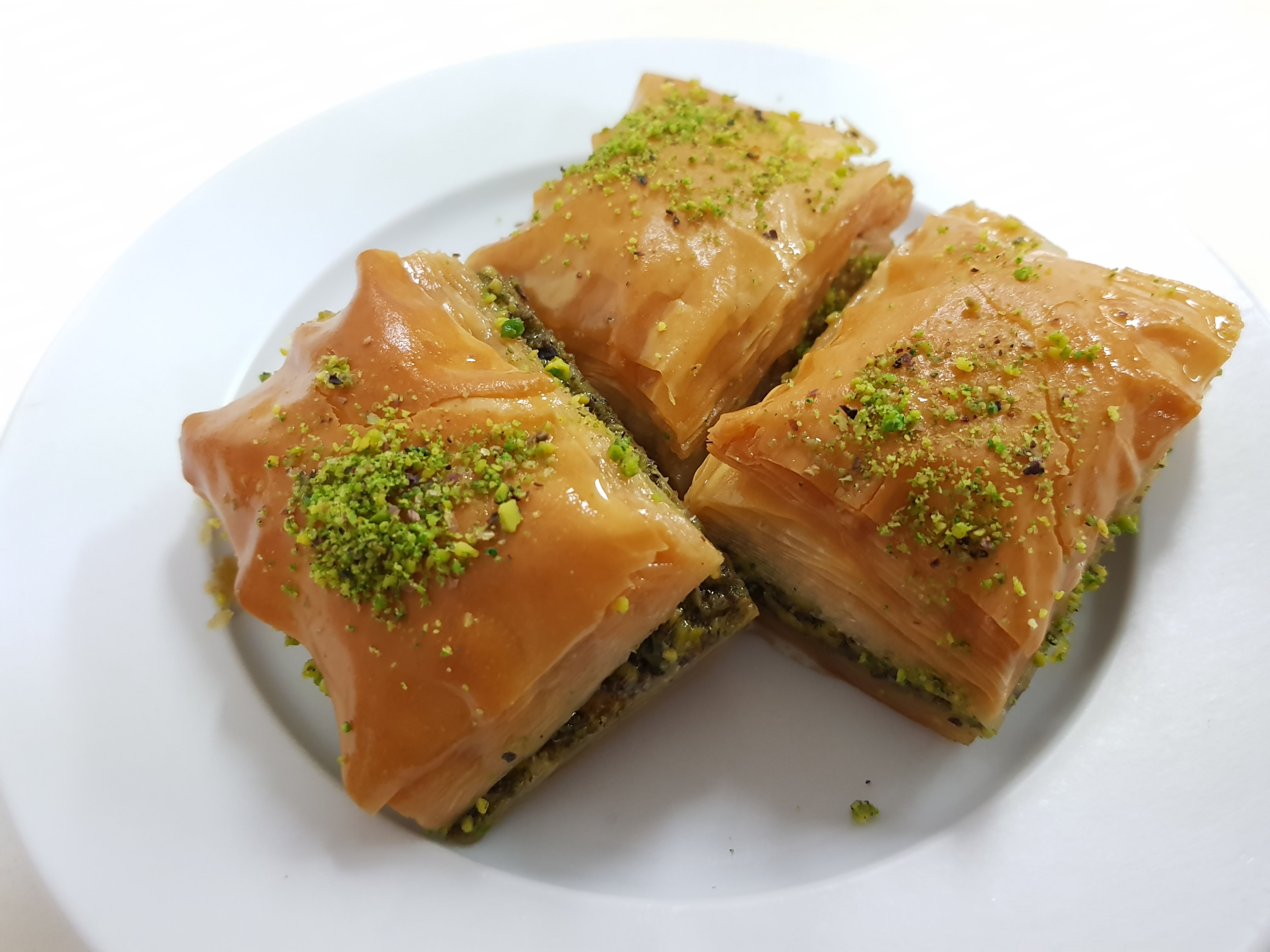
Baklava, probably developed in the imperial kitchens of the Topkapı Palace in Istanbul

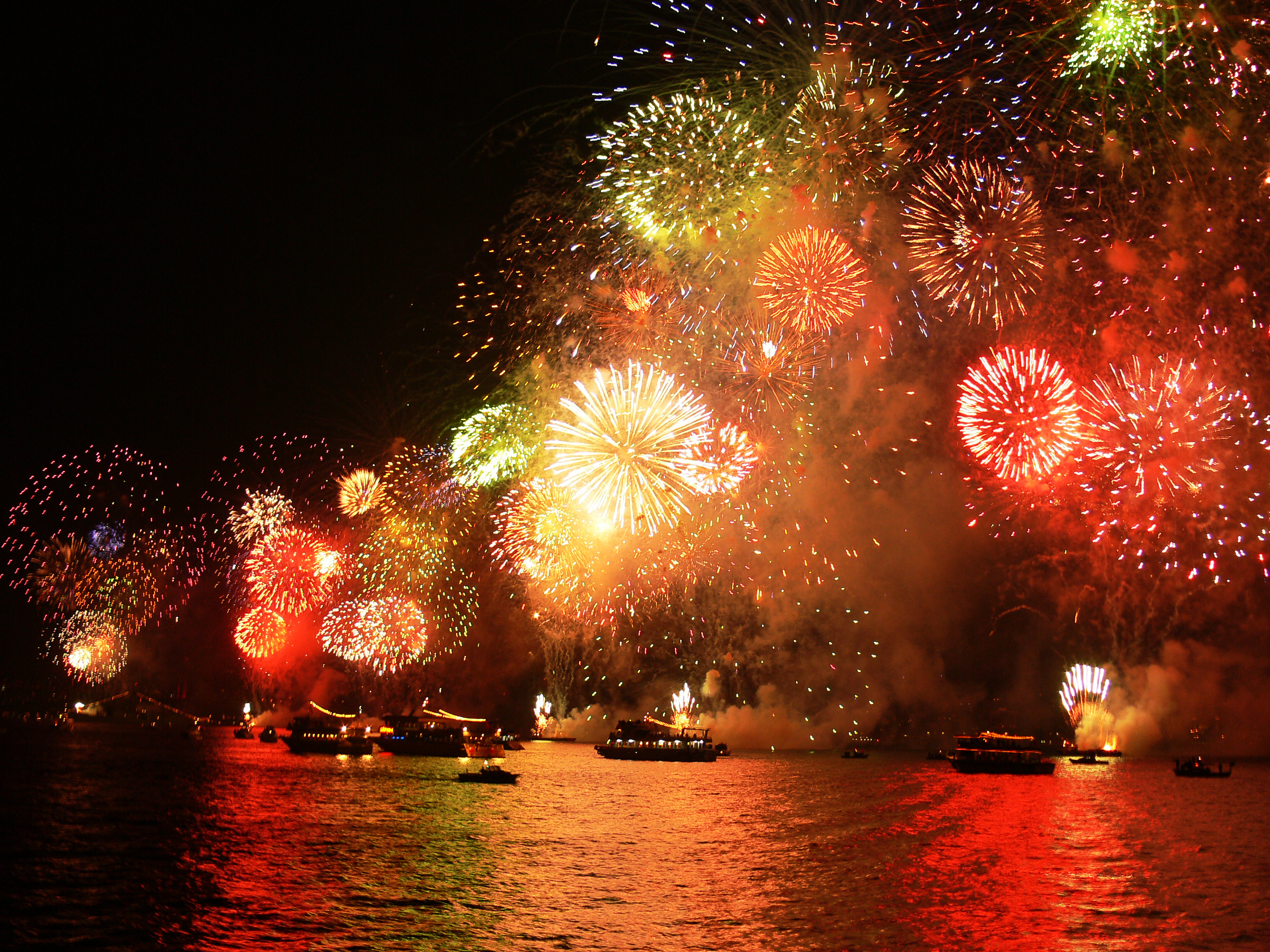
Republic Day celebrations on the Bosporus in Istanbul

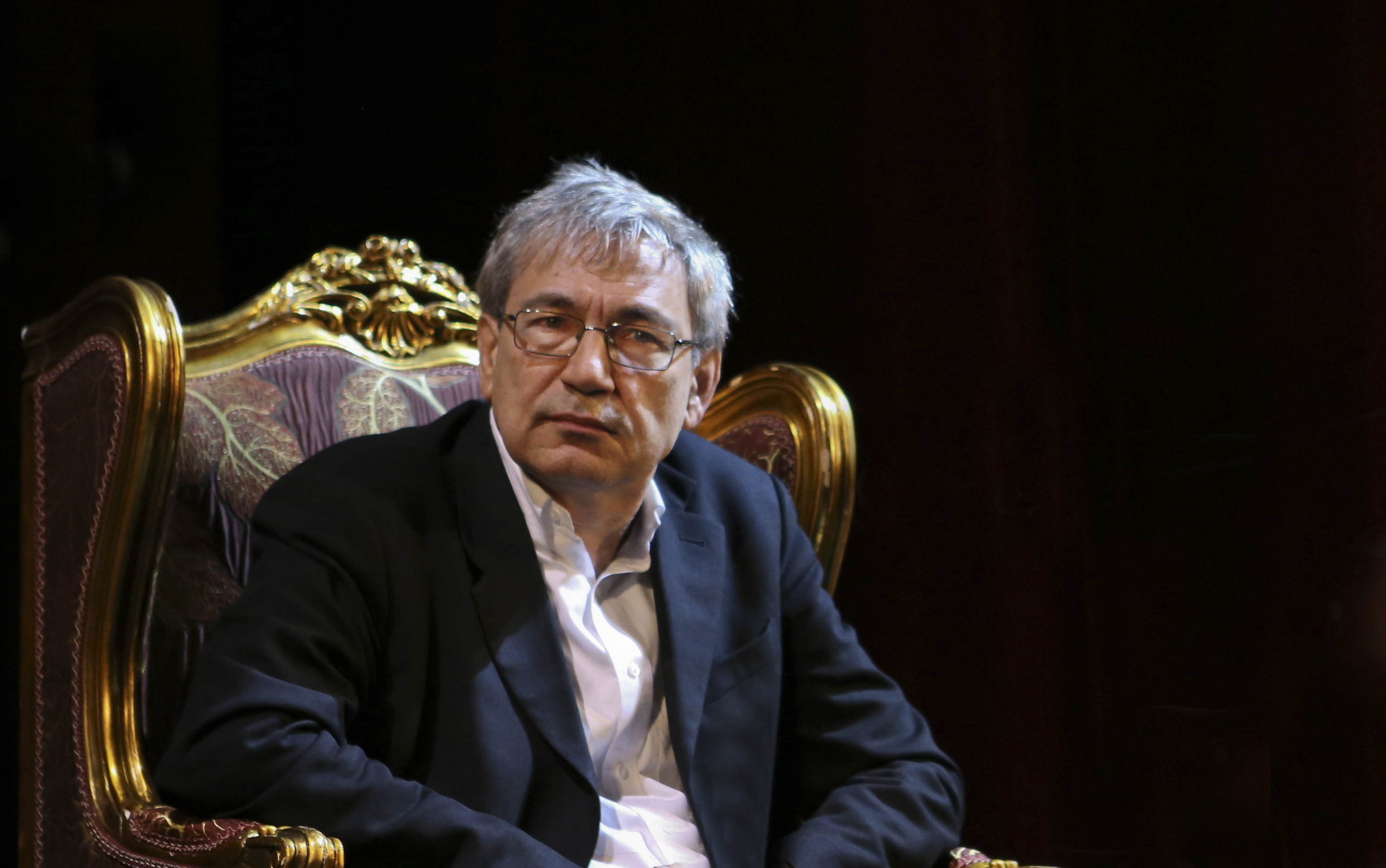
Orhan Pamuk, Turkish novelist, screenwriter, academic and recipient of the 2006 Nobel Prize in Literature

Art in Istanbul

- Istanbul in art / Paintings of Istanbul
- Public art in Istanbul
  - Akdeniz
  - The Feeler
  - Statue of Peace

Cuisine of Istanbul

- Baklava

Events in Istanbul

- Istanbul Biennial

Festivals in Istanbul

- International Istanbul Film Festival

Languages of Istanbul

- Turkish
- Greek

Media in Istanbul

- Newspapers in Istanbul
  - Hürriyet
  - Posta
- Radio and television in Istanbul
  - Turkish Radio and Television Corporation

People from Istanbul

- Cornelius Castoriadis
- Bülent Ecevit
- Recep Tayyip Erdoğan
- Fahri Korutürk
- Mike Lazaridis
- Orhan Pamuk
- Nicola Rossi-Lemeni

=== Religion in Istanbul ===
Religion in Istanbul

=== Sports in Istanbul ===
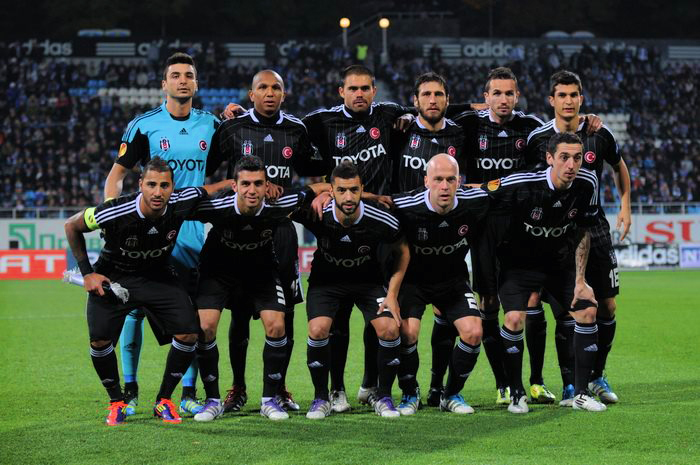
Beşiktaş football team in 2011

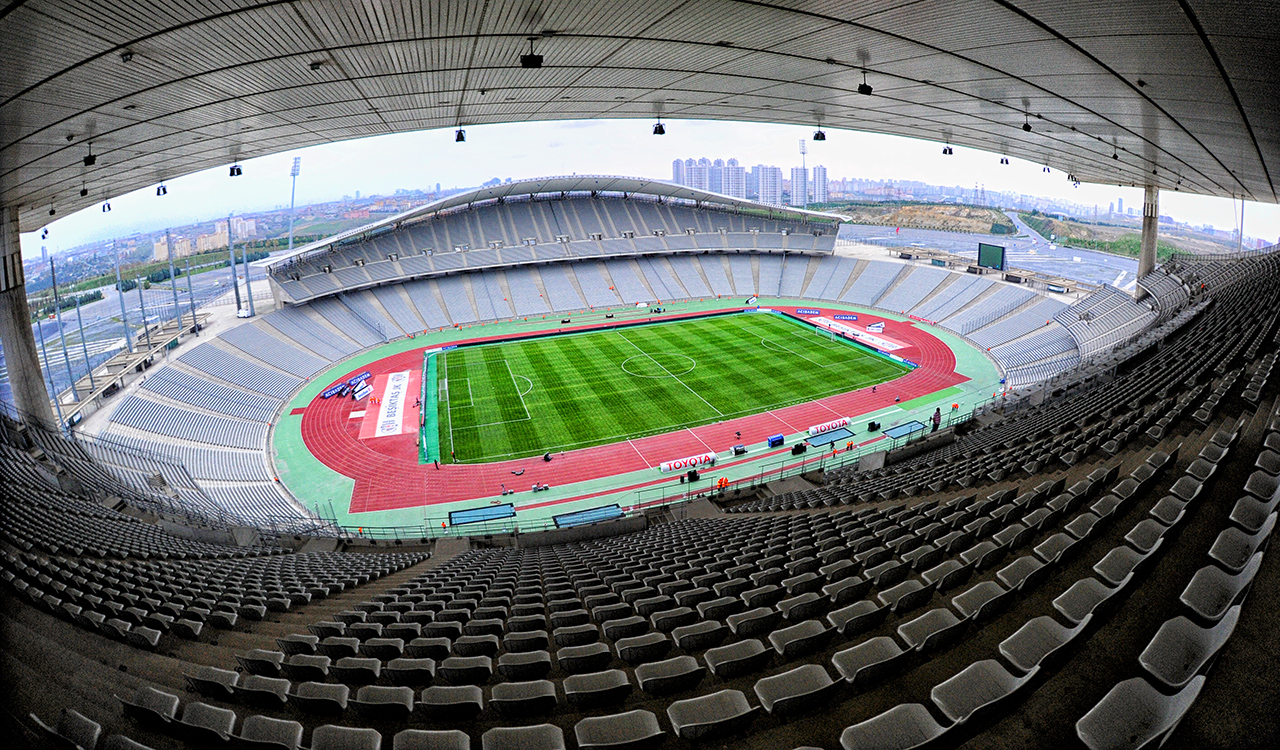
Atatürk Olympic Stadium, the largest stadium of Turkey

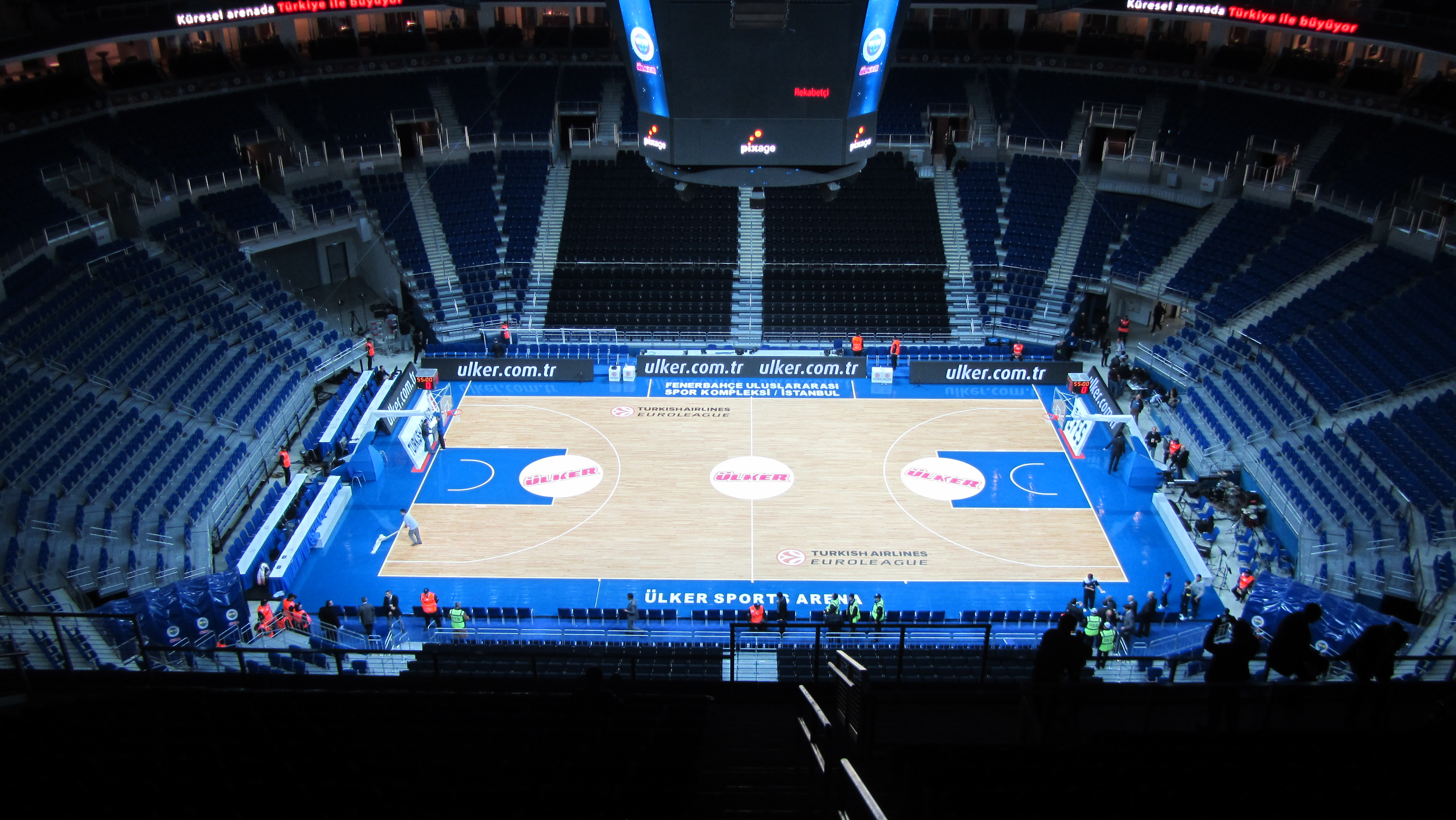
Ülker Sports and Event Hall

Sports in Istanbul

- Football in Istanbul
  - Association football in Istanbul
    - Süper Lig
      - Beşiktaş J.K.
      - İstanbul Başakşehir F.K.
- Basketball in Istanbul
  - Basketball Super League
    - Anadolu Efes S.K.
    - Fenerbahçe Basketball
- Sports events in Istanbul
  - Bosphorus Cup (figure skating)
  - Istanbul Marathon
  - Istanbul Open
- Sports venues in Istanbul
  - Ataköy Athletics Arena
  - Atatürk Olympic Stadium
  - BJK Akatlar Arena
  - Istanbul Park
  - Rams Park
  - Şükrü Saracoğlu Stadium
  - Ülker Sports and Event Hall
  - Veliefendi Race Course
  - Vodafone Park

== Economy and infrastructure of Istanbul ==
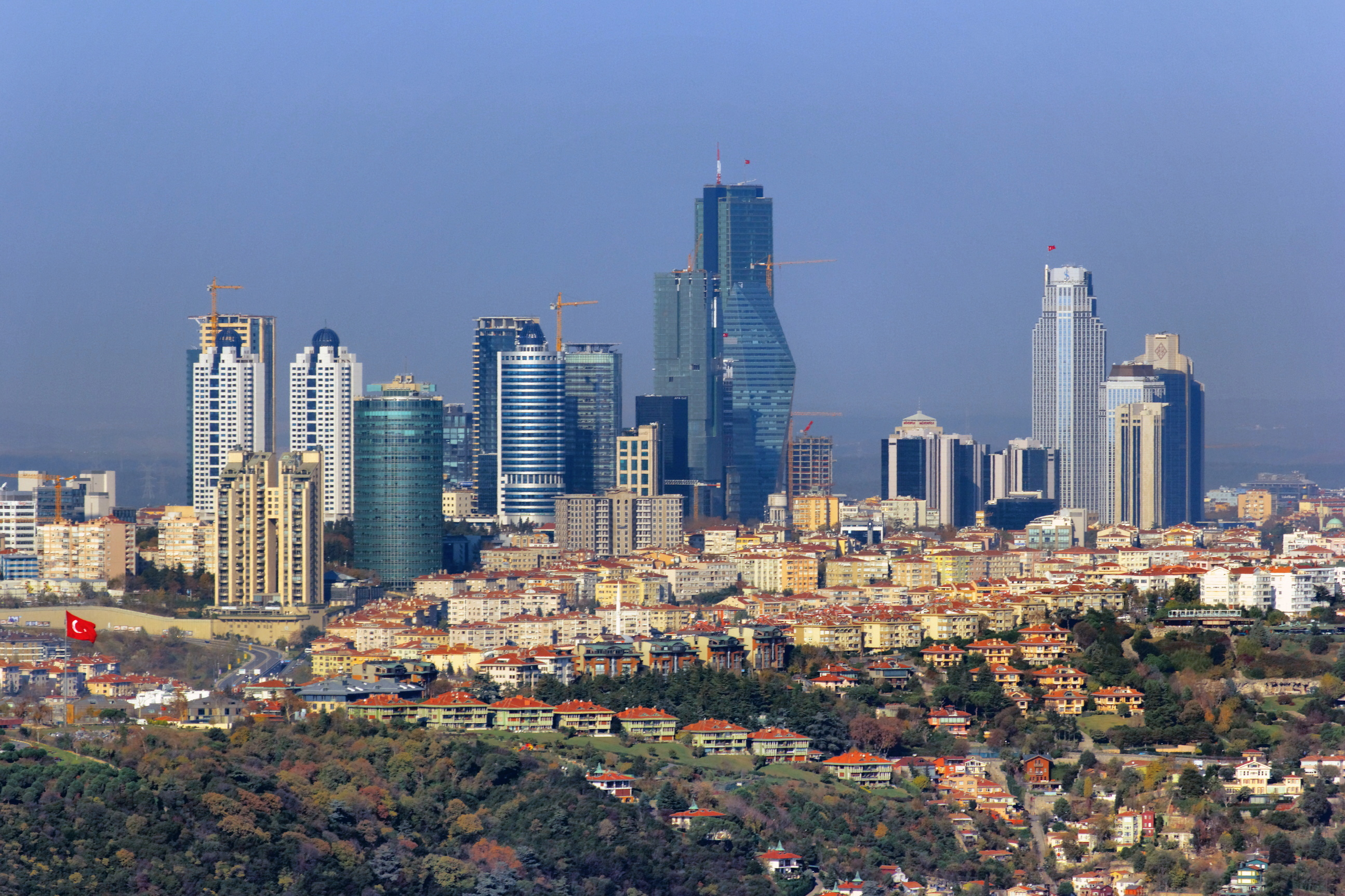
Levent business district

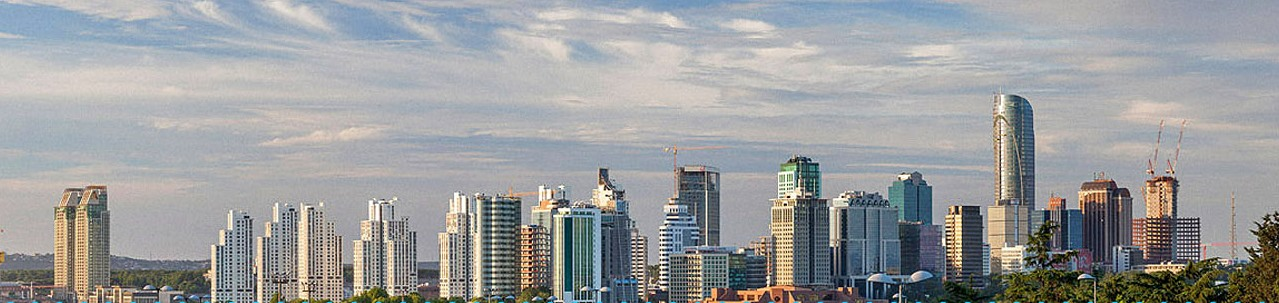
A panorama of Maslak business district

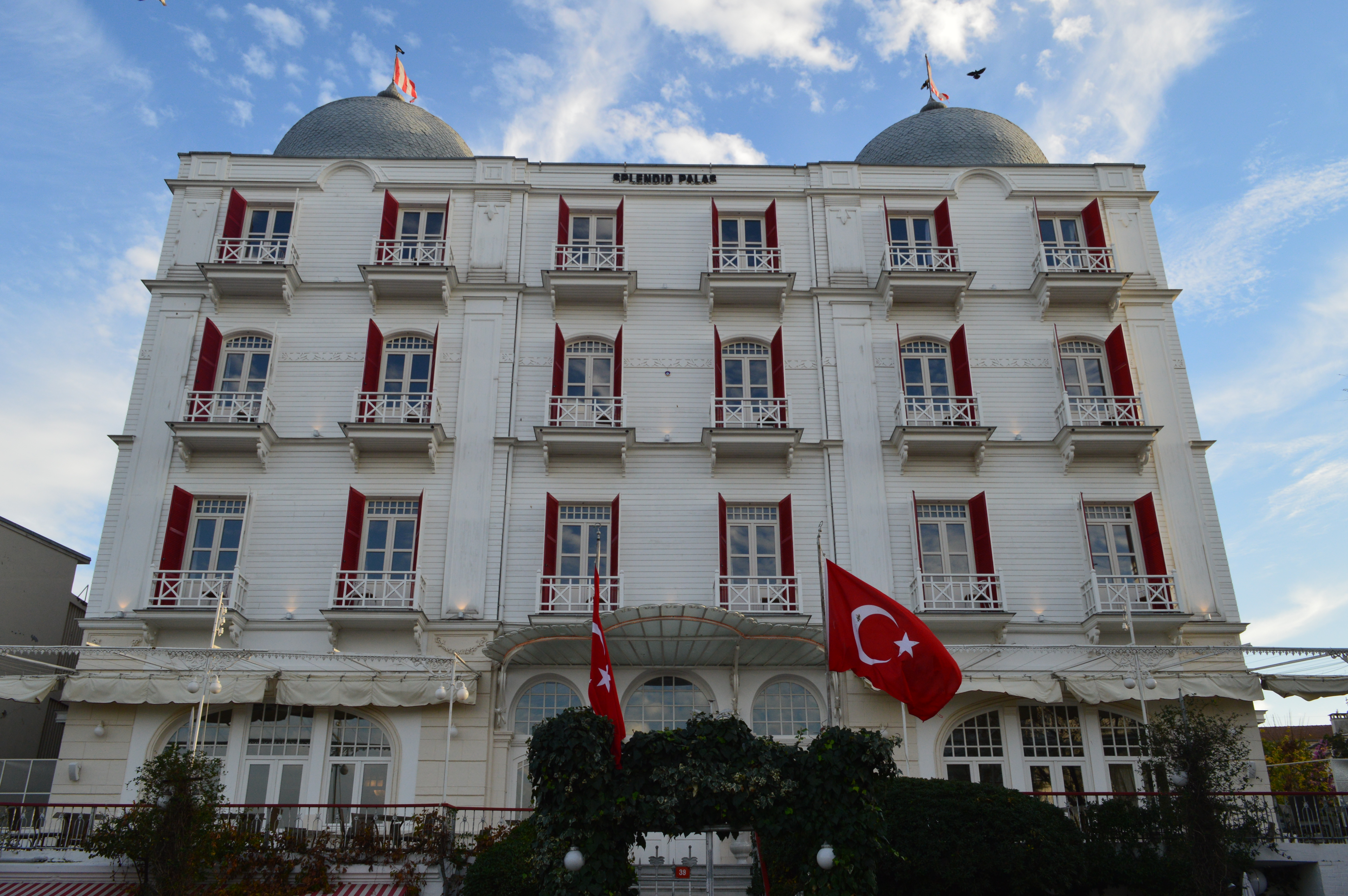
Splendid Palace Hotel

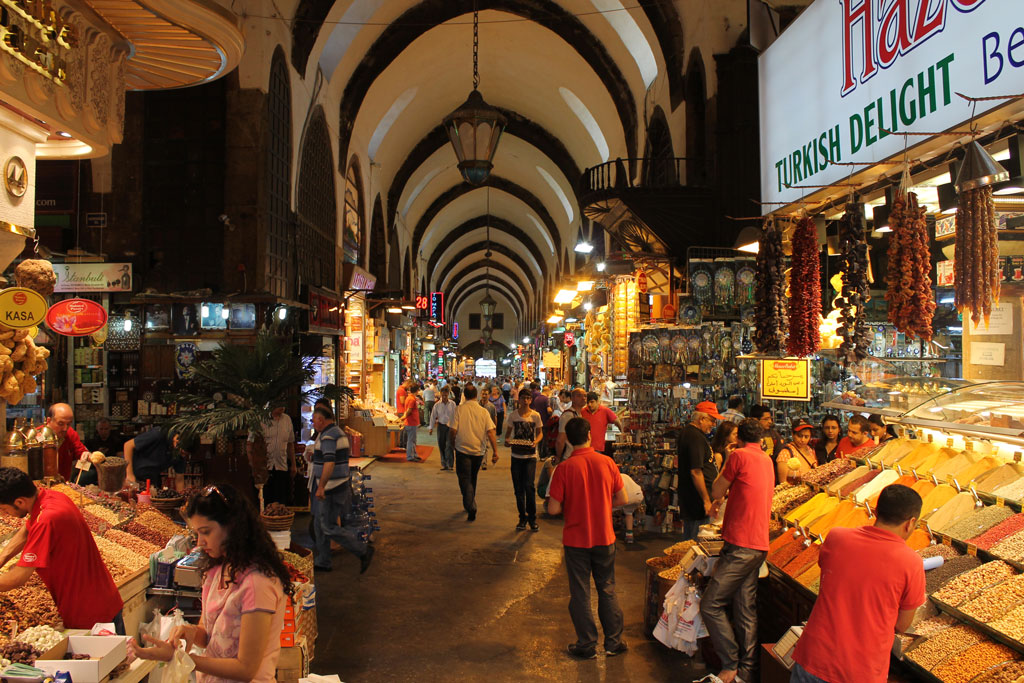
Grand Bazaar, one of the largest and oldest covered markets in the world

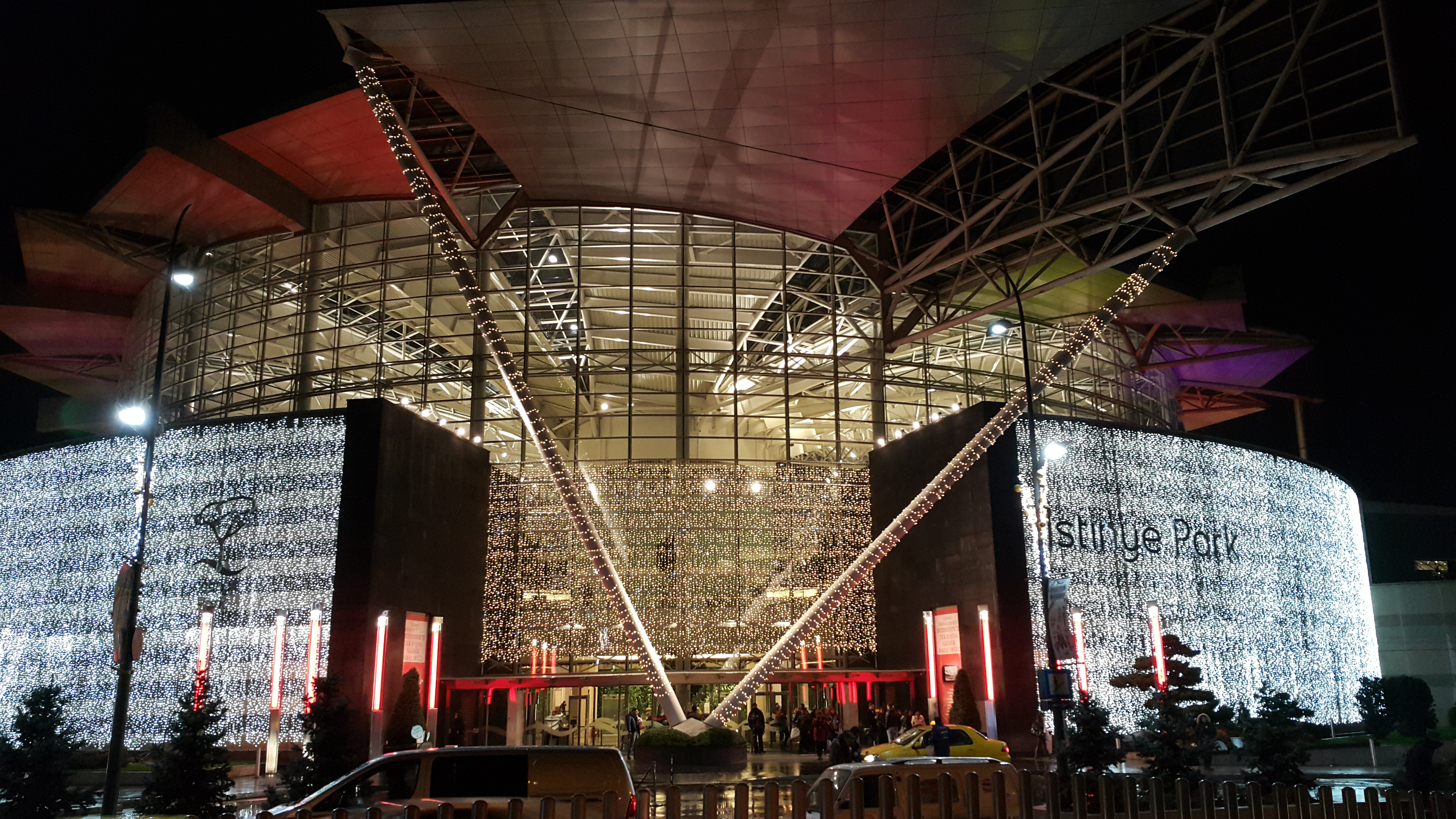
İstinye Park shopping center

Economy of Istanbul

- Business districts in Istanbul
  - Levent
  - Maslak
- Companies in Istanbul
  - Goldaş
  - Koç Holding
  - Petrol Ofisi
- Financial services in Istanbul
  - Akbank
  - Borsa Istanbul
- Hotels and resorts in Istanbul
  - Çırağan Palace
  - Divan Istanbul
  - Hilton Istanbul Bosphorus
  - Hotel Yeşil Ev
  - Istanbul 4th Vakıf Han
  - Pera Palace Hotel
  - Raffles Istanbul
- Restaurants and cafés in Istanbul
  - Changa
  - Hünkar
  - Ismet Baba Fish Restaurant
  - Mikla
- Shopping malls and markets in Istanbul
  - Shopping malls in Istanbul
  - Grand Bazaar
  - Mahmutpasha Bazaar
  - Spice Bazaar
- Tourism in Istanbul
  - Tourist attractions in Istanbul
    - Grand Bazaar
    - Historic Areas of Istanbul
- Utilities in Istanbul
  - Silahtarağa Power Station
  - Water supply and sanitation in Istanbul

=== Transportation in Istanbul ===
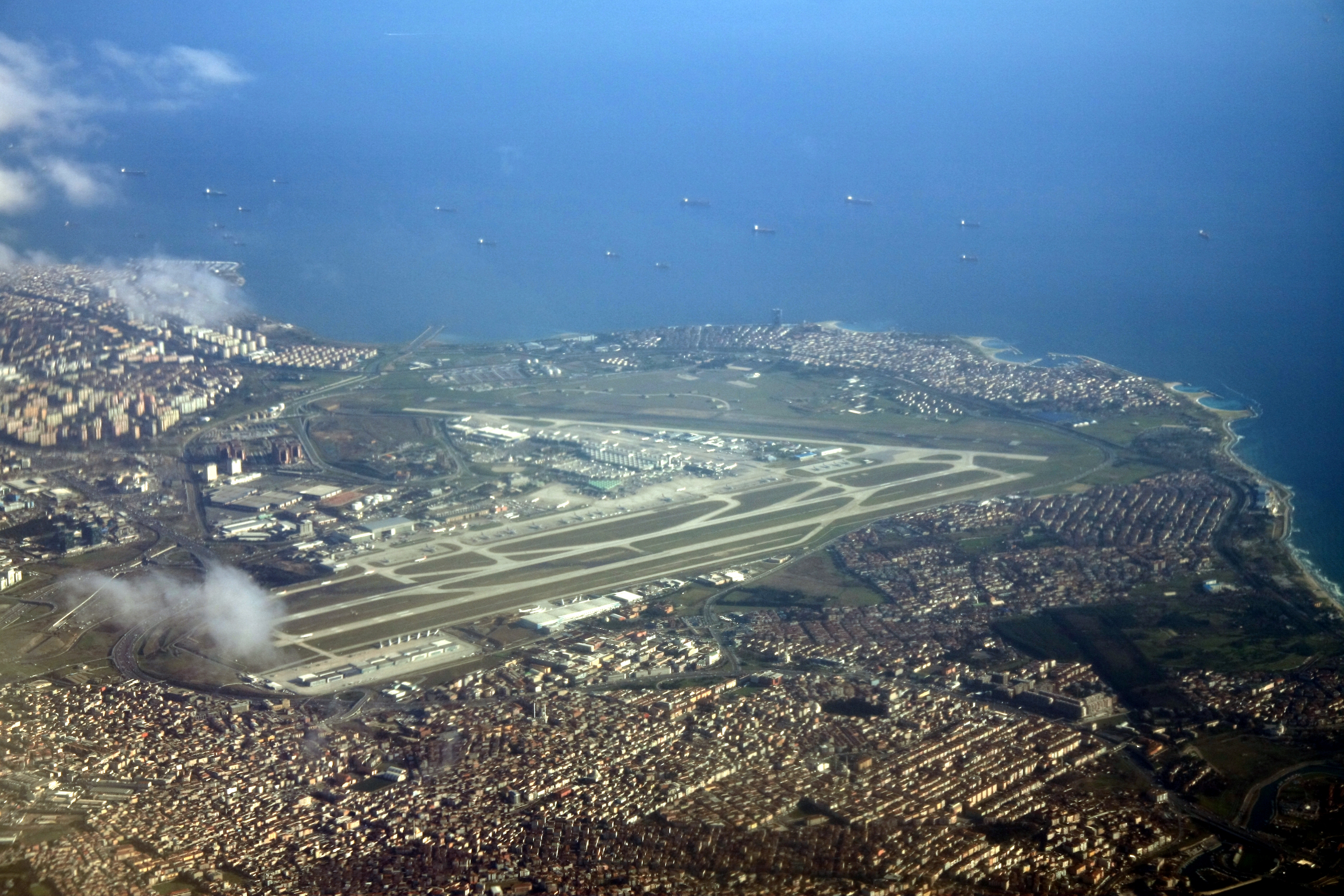
Istanbul Atatürk Airport

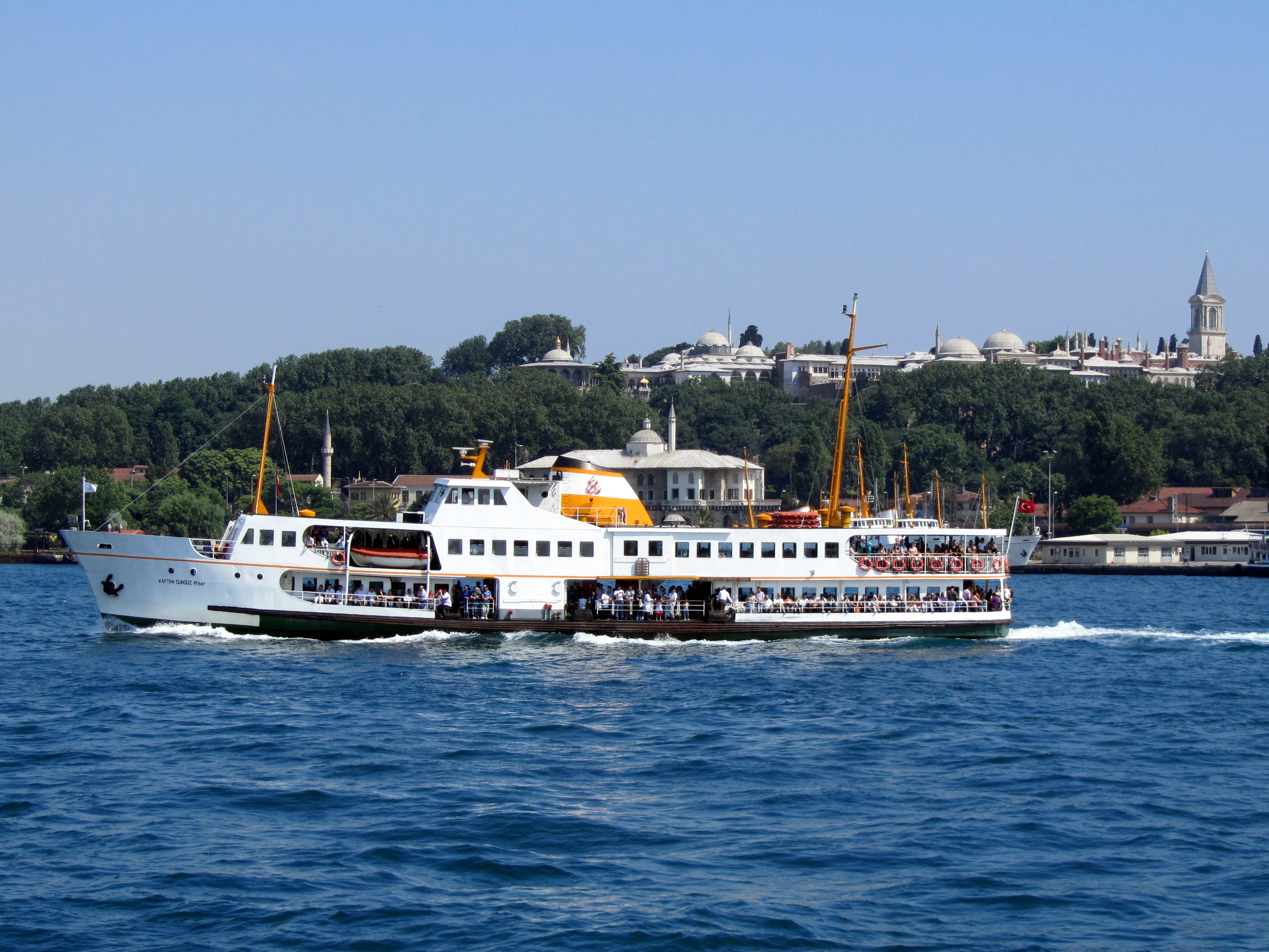
A ferry with the Topkapı Palace in the background

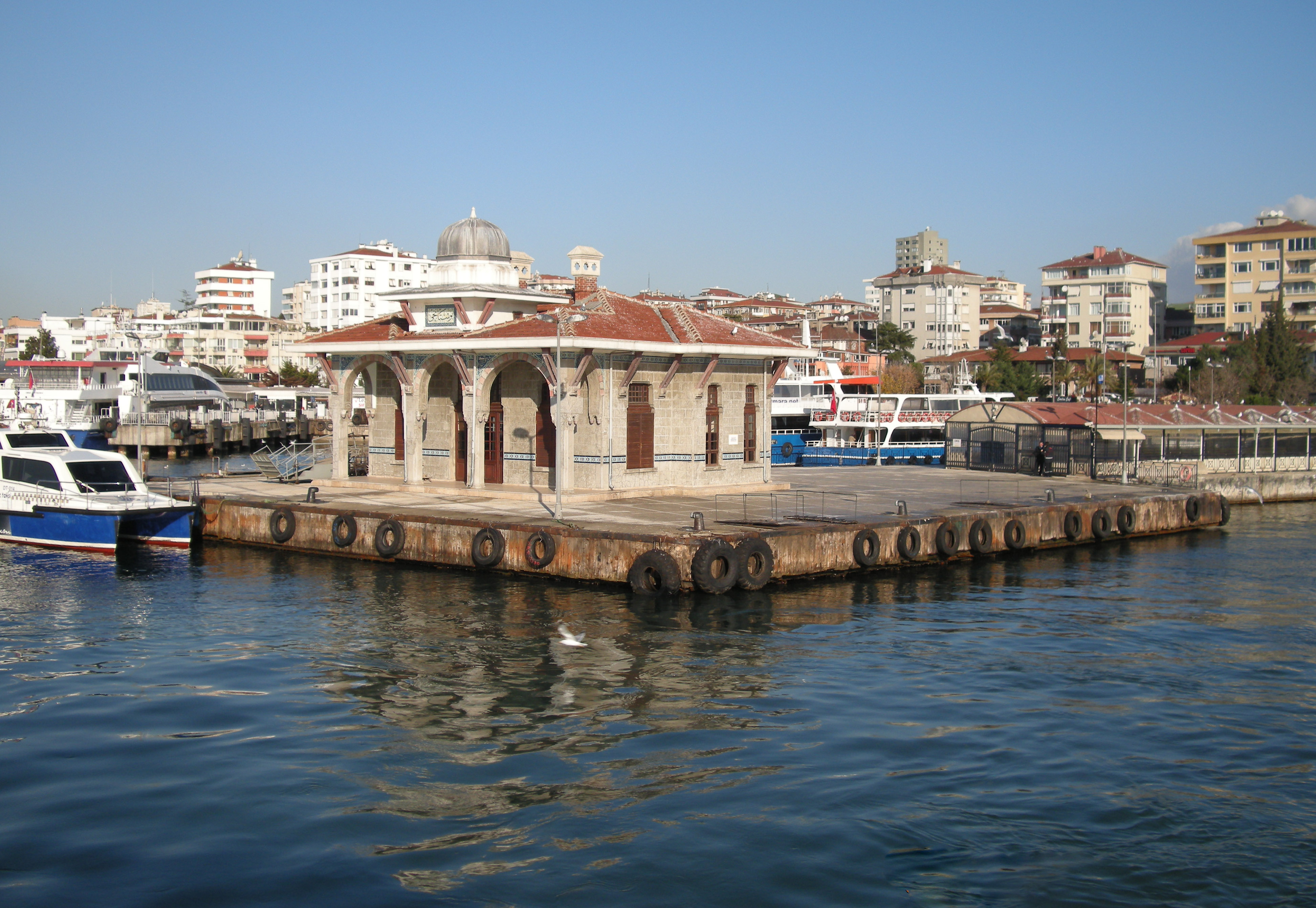
Bostancı quay, Kadıköy

Public transport in Istanbul

- Air transport in Istanbul
  - Airports in Istanbul
    - Atatürk Airport
    - Istanbul Airport
    - Istanbul Sabiha Gökçen International Airport
- Cable transport in Istanbul
  - Eyüp Gondola
  - Maçka Gondola
- Maritime transport in Istanbul
  - Ferries in Istanbul
    - Ferry quays in İstanbul
  - Port of Istanbul
  - Port of Haydarpaşa
- Road transport in Istanbul
  - Busses in Istanbul
    - Metrobus
  - Roads in Istanbul
    - Otoyol 1
    - Otoyol 2
  - Tunnels
    - Eurasia Tunnel
    - Great Istanbul Tunnel
    - Marmaray Tunnel

==== Rail transport in Istanbul ====
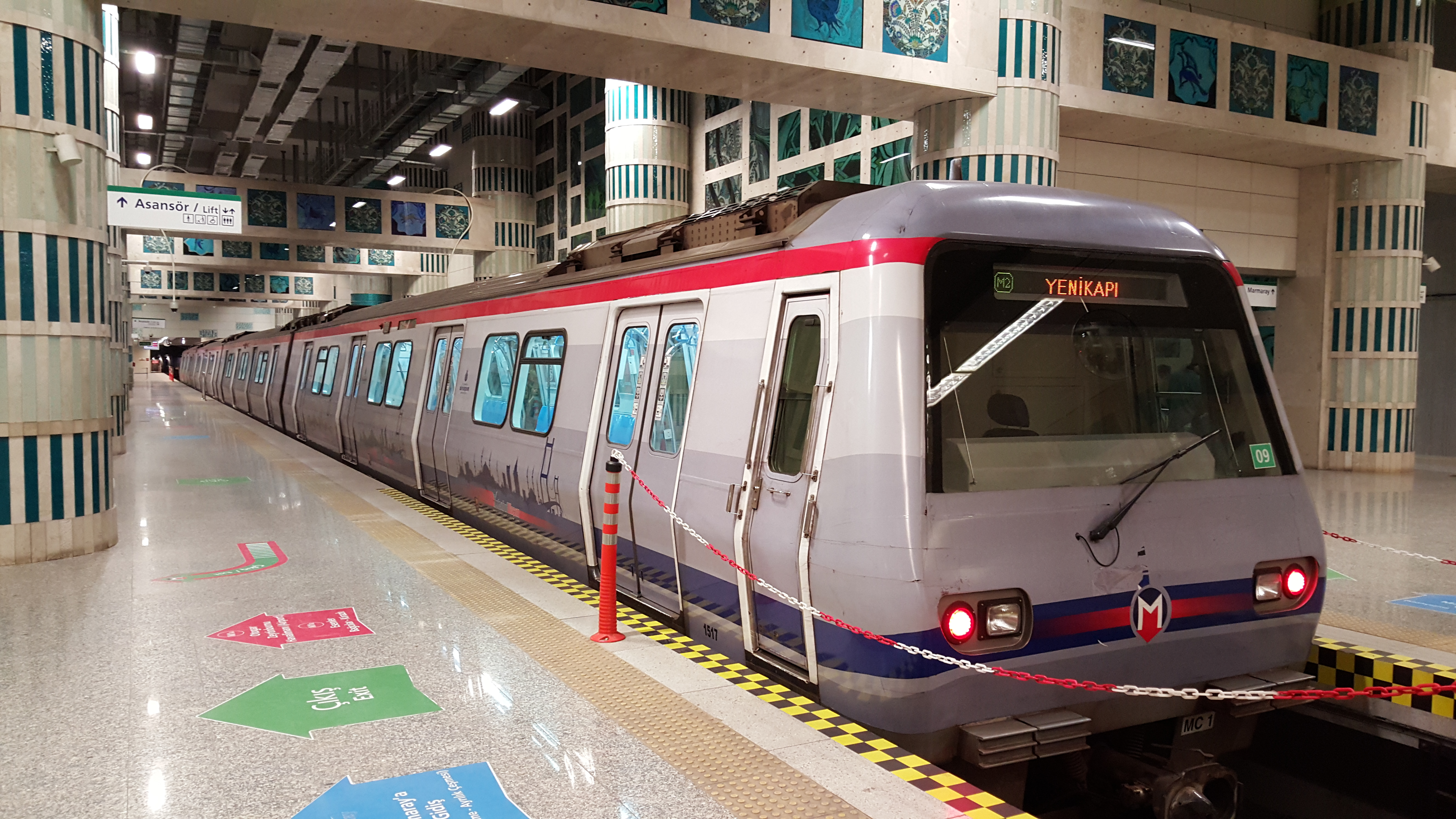
Yenikapı station on Istanbul Metro line M2

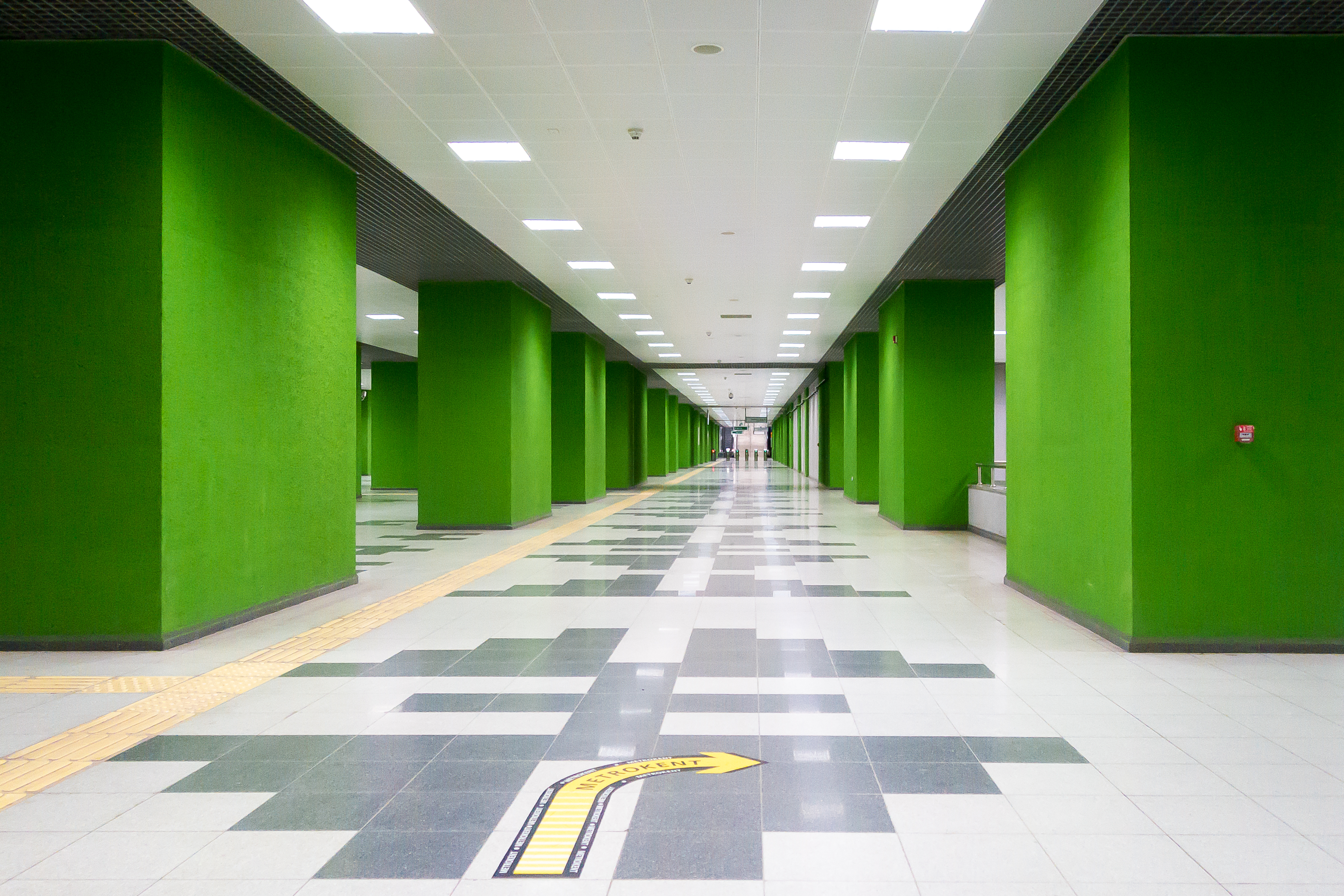
Mahmutbey station on Istanbul Metro line M3

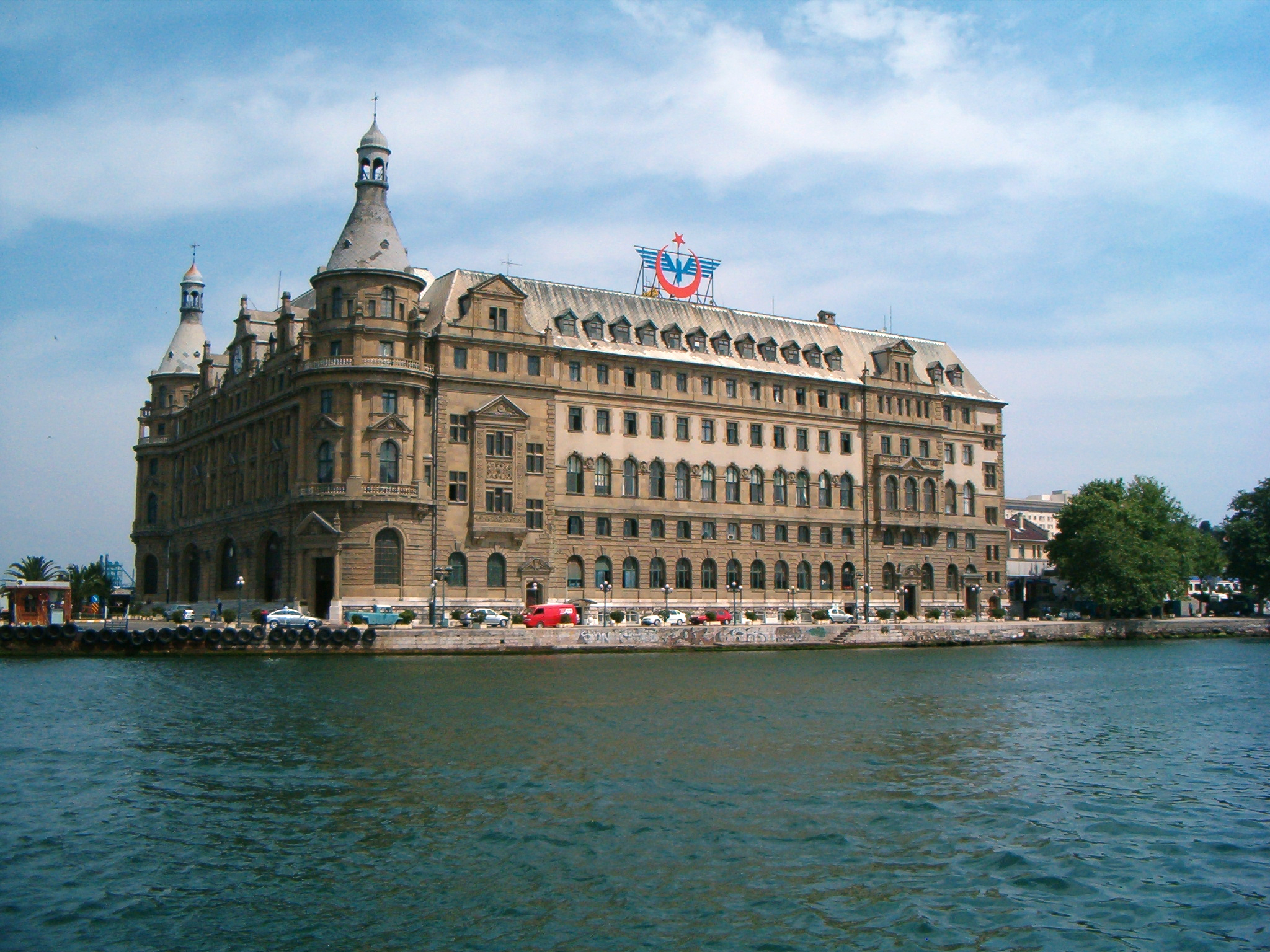
Haydarpaşa railway station

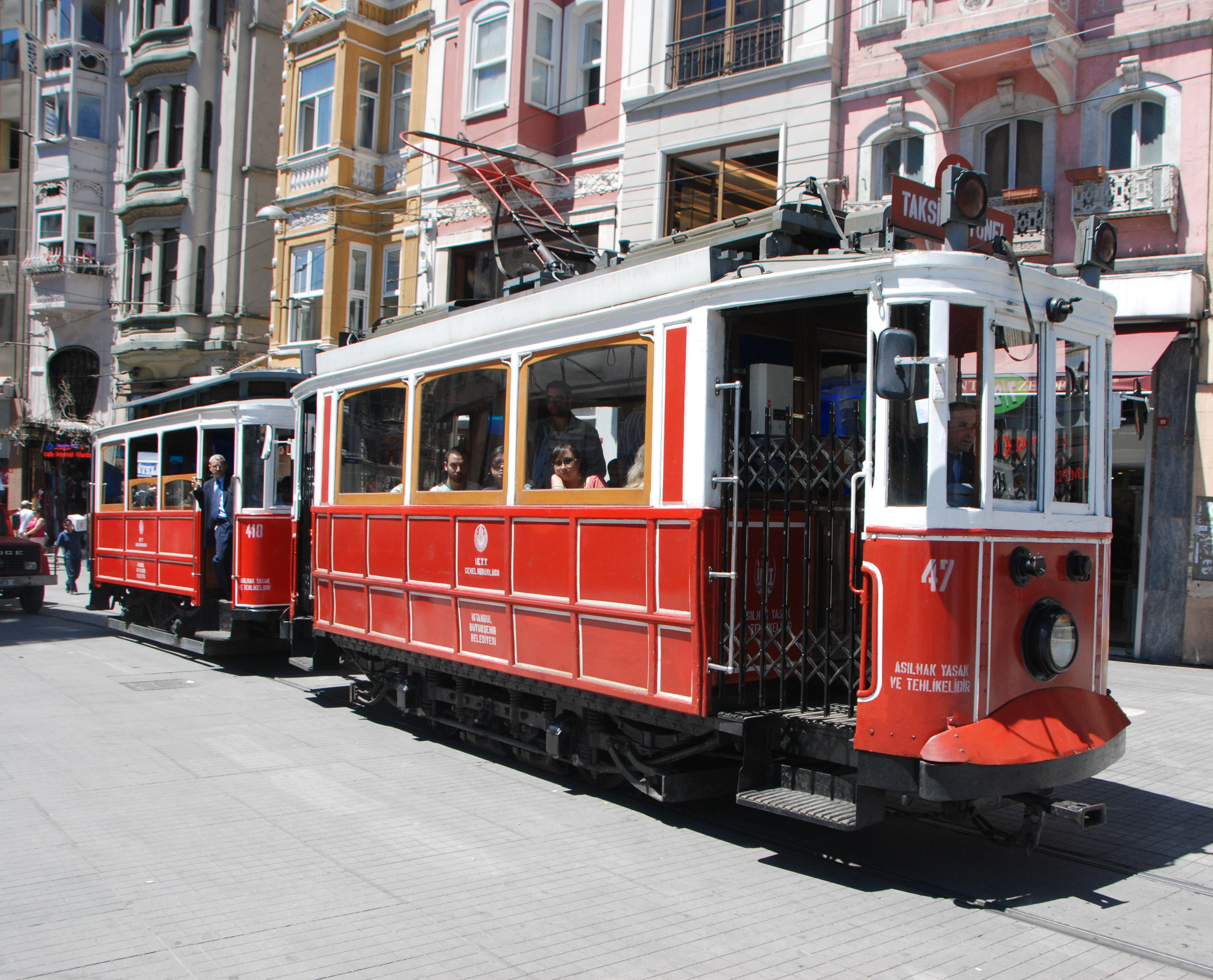
A nostalgic tram on Istiklal Avenue

- Commuter rail lines
  - Marmaray
- Istanbul Metro
  - Lines
    - (under construction)
    - (under construction)
    - (under construction)
    - (under construction)
    - (line on hold)
  - Stations
- Funicular railway
  - F1 Taksim–Kabataş funicular line
  - F2 Tünel
  - F3 Vadistanbul-Seyrantepe funicular line
  - F4 Boğaziçi Üni./Hisarüstü–Aşiyan funicular line
- Railway stations in Istanbul
  - Haydarpaşa railway station
  - Sirkeci railway station
- Trams in Istanbul
  - Trams in Istanbul (1871-1966), former tramways
  - Istanbul nostalgic tramways
  - Istanbul Tram
    - T1 (Istanbul Tram)
    - T4 (Istanbul Tram)
    - T5 (Istanbul Tram)

== Education in Istanbul ==
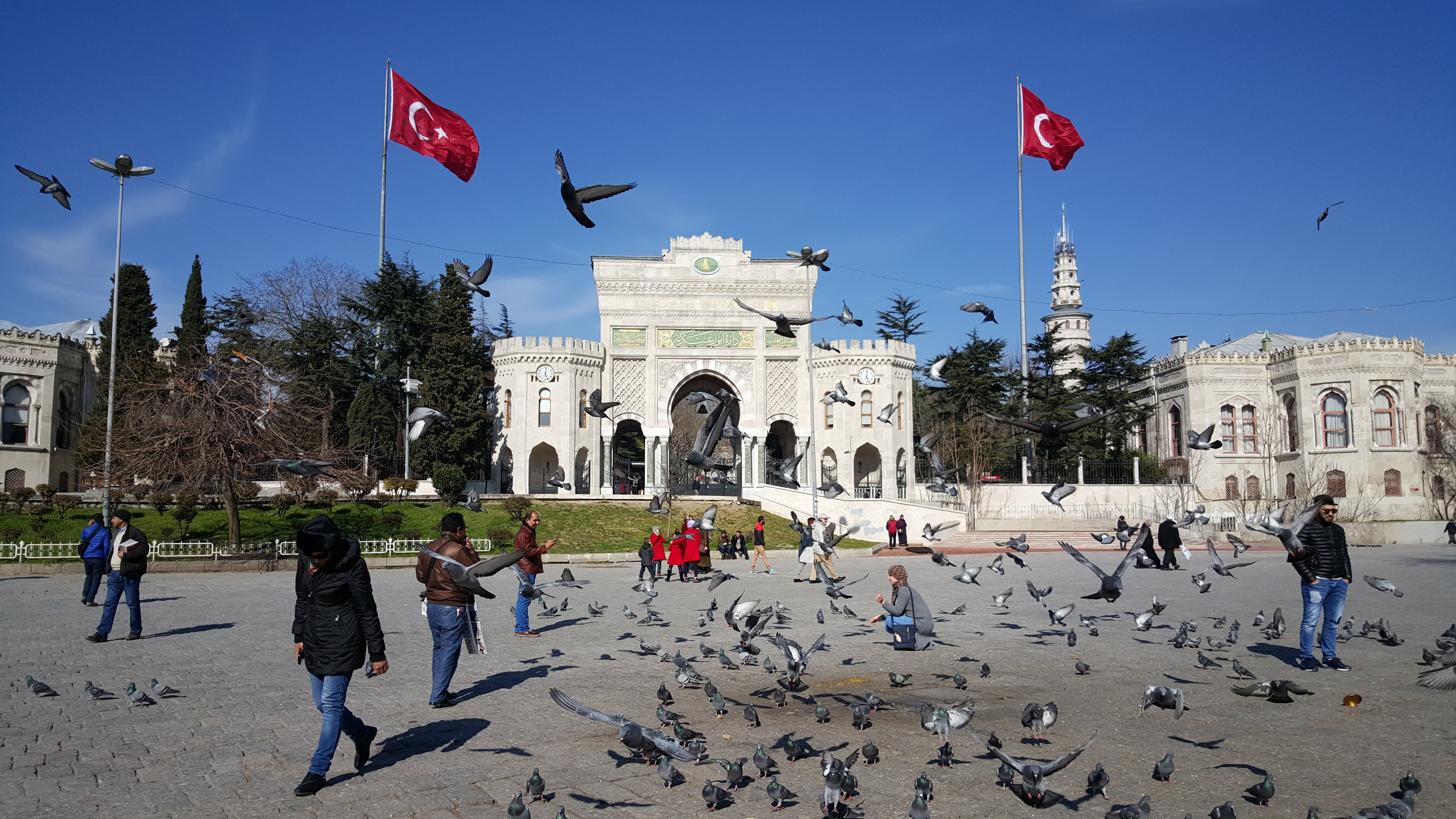
Main gate of Istanbul University

Education in Istanbul

- Libraries in Istanbul
- Universities and colleges in Istanbul
  - Boğaziçi University
  - Istanbul Technical University
  - Istanbul University
  - Marmara University

== Healthcare in Istanbul ==
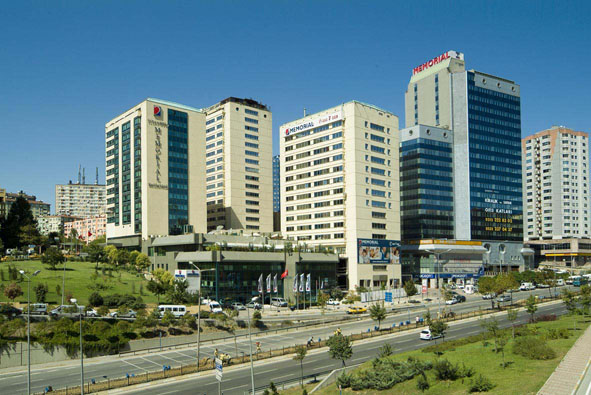
Memorial Hospital in Şişli

- Hospitals in Istanbul
  - Acıbadem Hospital
  - Bakırköy Psychiatric Hospital
  - Balıklı Greek Hospital
  - Istanbul Italian Hospital
  - Surp Agop Hospital
  - Surp Pırgiç Armenian Hospital
  - Taksim German Hospital

== See also ==
- Outline of geography
