= Economy of Istanbul =

Economy of Istanbul covers the issues related to the economy of the city of Istanbul, Turkey.

== Overview ==
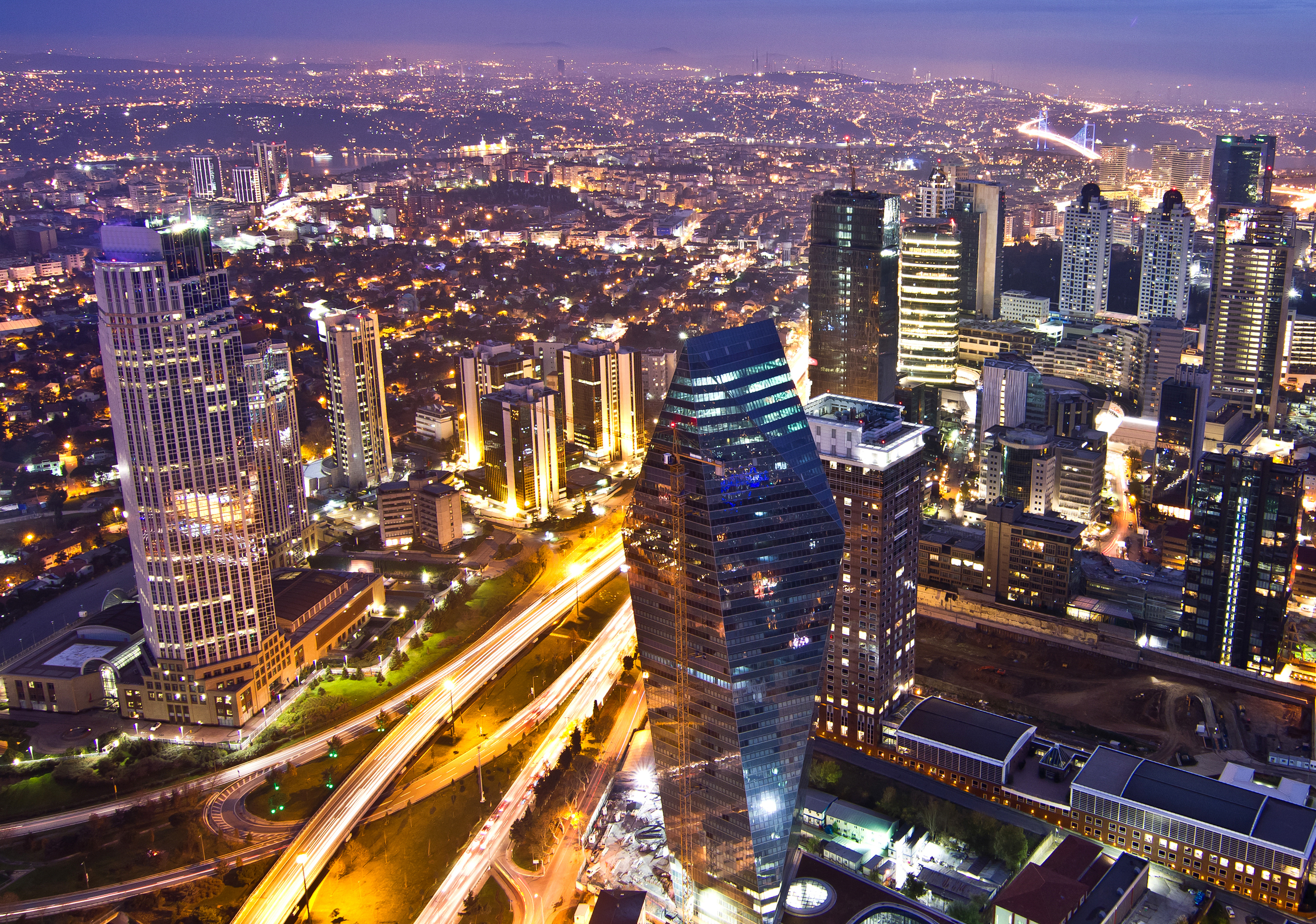
Levent business district in Istanbul, 2013

Historically, Istanbul has been the center of the country's economic life because of its location as an international junction of land and sea trade routes. In 2012 the City of Istanbul had a GDP of $245.2 billion.

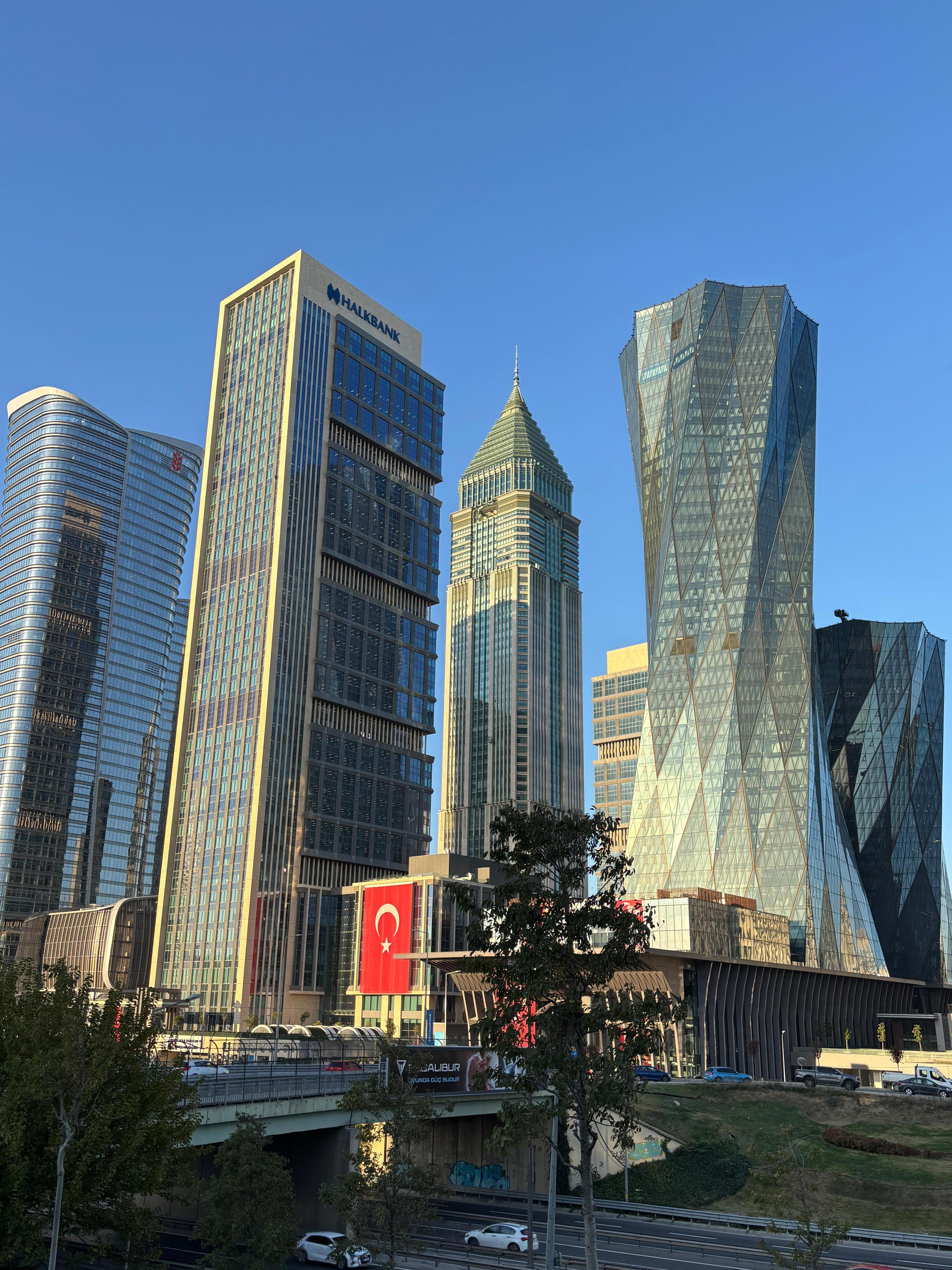
Istanbul Financial Center, 2025

In 2008, companies based in Istanbul made exports worth $41,397,000,000 and imports worth $69,883,000,000; which corresponded to 56.6% and 60.2% of Turkey's exports and imports, respectively, in that year. In 2006 Turkey's exports grew a further +16.1% while imports grew +17.6% because of a rising demand of energy resources and raw materials by the industrial manufacturers in the country.

According to Forbes magazine, Istanbul had a total of 37 billionaires in 2013, ranking 5th in the world behind Moscow (84 billionaires), New York City (62 billionaires), Hong Kong (43 billionaires) and London (43 billionaires).

Income distribution is not evenly distributed in Istanbul, such that 20% of the highest income group uses 64% of the resources and 20% of the lowest income group uses 4% of the resources (based on 1994 statistics).

The change in Istanbul's living standards is a direct reflection of the nation's statistics as the 27.5% share of the total consumption in Turkey is performed by the population of Istanbul.

In the late 1990s, the economy of Turkey, and Istanbul in particular, suffered several major depressions. The Asian financial crisis between July 1997 and the beginning of 1998, as well as the crisis in Russia between August 1998 and the middle of 1999 had negative effects in all areas of the economy, particularly on exports. Following this setback, a slow reorganization of the economy of Istanbul was observed in 1999.

The major earthquake which was epicentered in nearby Kocaeli on 17 August 1999, triggered one of the largest economic shocks for the city. Apart from the capital and human losses caused by the disaster, a decrease in GDP of approximately two percent occurred. Despite these downturns, Istanbul's economy has strongly improved and recovered in following years.

Istanbul was hit hard by the 2018 Turkish currency and debt crisis. In August 2018, almost one-third of the office space in the city was vacant, and office rental prices across all segments had fallen sharply.

Since 2021, there has been a steady recovery and rapid growth in Turkey's nominal GDP and GDP (PPP), which have reached their all-time highest values in both 2023 and 2024.

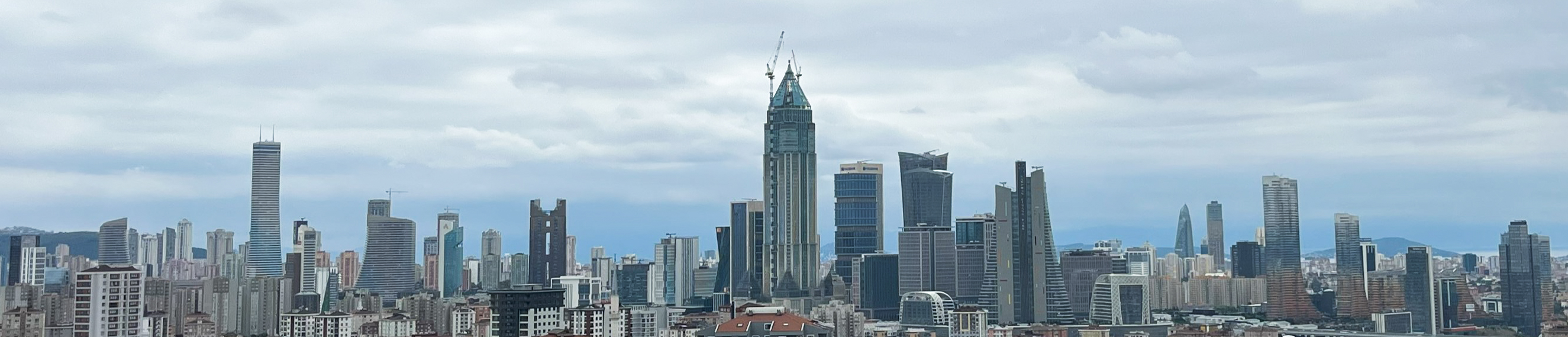
Skyline of Ataşehir district on the Asian side of Istanbul, with the Metropol Istanbul Towers at left, and the Istanbul Financial Center complex (with the CBRT Tower rising prominently at its core) near the center of the frame.

== Financial sector ==
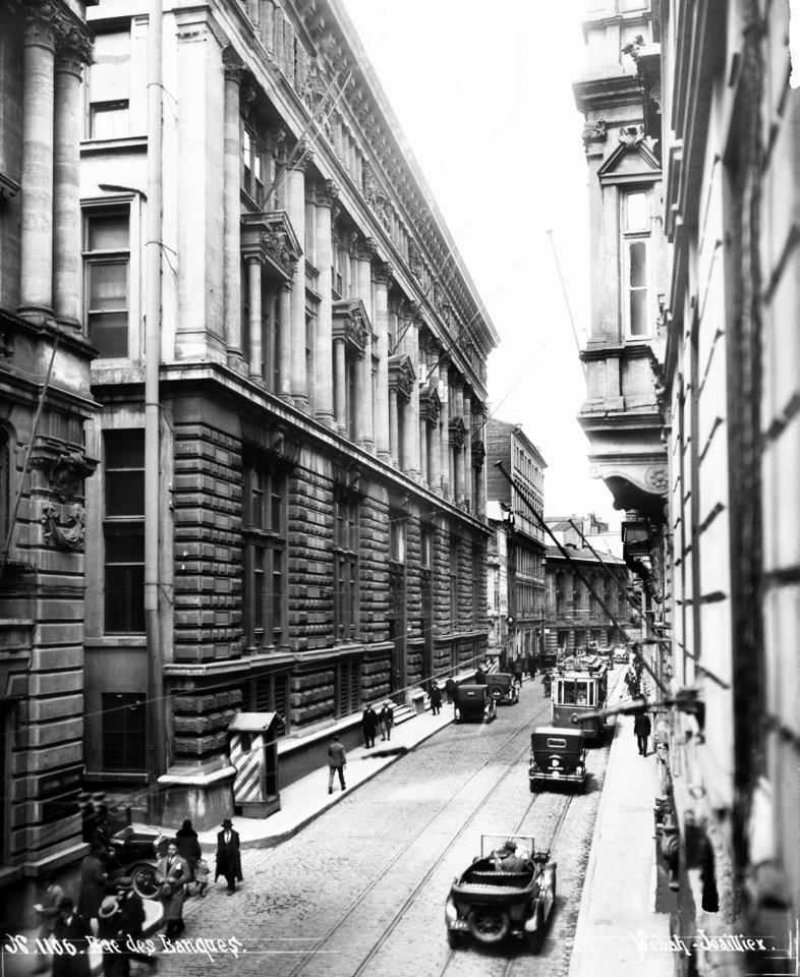
Bankalar Caddesi (Banks Street), historically named "Voyvoda Yolu" (Voivode Road) as mentioned in the 17th century Seyahatnâme of Evliya Çelebi, was Istanbul's financial centre during the Ottoman period. Completed in 1892, the Ottoman Bank headquarters is seen at left.

Istanbul has always been the "financial capital" of Turkey, even after Ankara became the new political capital in 1923. The opening of specific markets in the city during the 1980s further strengthened this status. Inaugurated at the beginning of 1986, the Istanbul Stock Exchange (ISE) is the sole securities market of Turkey, established to provide trading in equities, right coupons, Government bonds, Treasury bills, revenue sharing certificates, bonds issued by the Privatization Administration and corporate bonds, and to carry out overnight transactions.

In 1993 the ISE decided on gold market liberalization, and in 1995 the Istanbul Gold Exchange was established, which ended the gold bullion imports monopoly of the Turkish Central Bank and transferred it to the private sector members of the gold exchange.

Levent, Maslak and Şişli financial districts are home to the headquarters of Turkey's largest companies and banks, as well as the local headquarters of Citibank, Merrill Lynch, J. P. Morgan, HSBC, ABN Amro, Fortis, ING Bank, BNP Paribas, Société Générale, Banca di Roma, UniCredit, WestLB, Deutsche Bank, Commerzbank, Milli Reasürans and VHV Reasürans. Both Levent and Maslak have several new skyscraper projects being proposed, approved and initiated every year.

== Industry ==
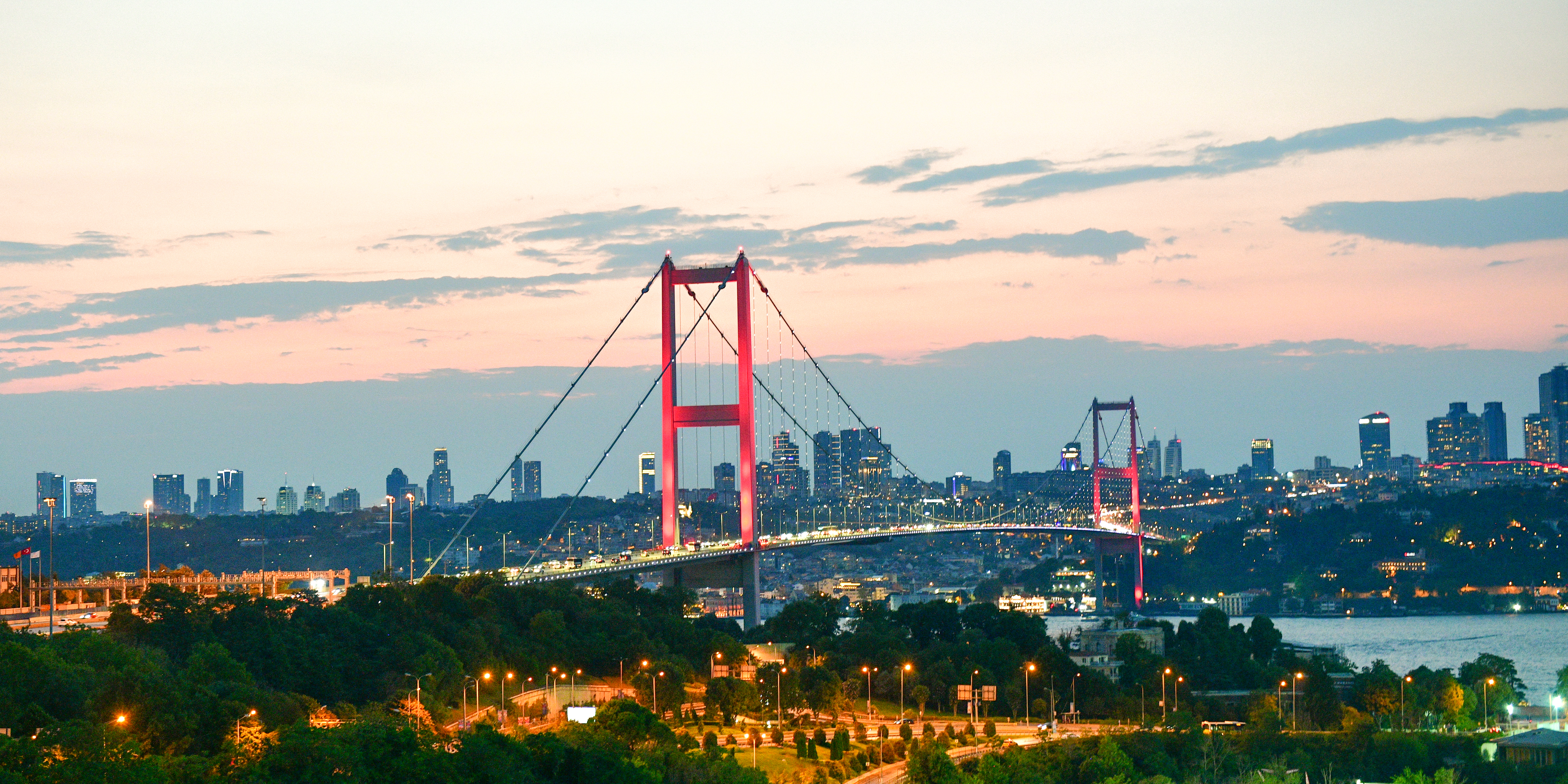
The Bosphorus Bridge (1973) is the oldest of three suspension bridges and two undersea tunnels which span the Bosphorus strait in Istanbul.

Istanbul is the "industrial center" of Turkey. It employs approximately 20% of Turkey's industrial labor and contributes 38% of Turkey's industrial workspace. In addition, the city generates 55% of Turkey's trade and 45% of the country's wholesale trade, and generates 21.2% of Turkey's gross national product. Istanbul contributes 40% of all taxes collected in Turkey and produces 27.5% of Turkey's national product.

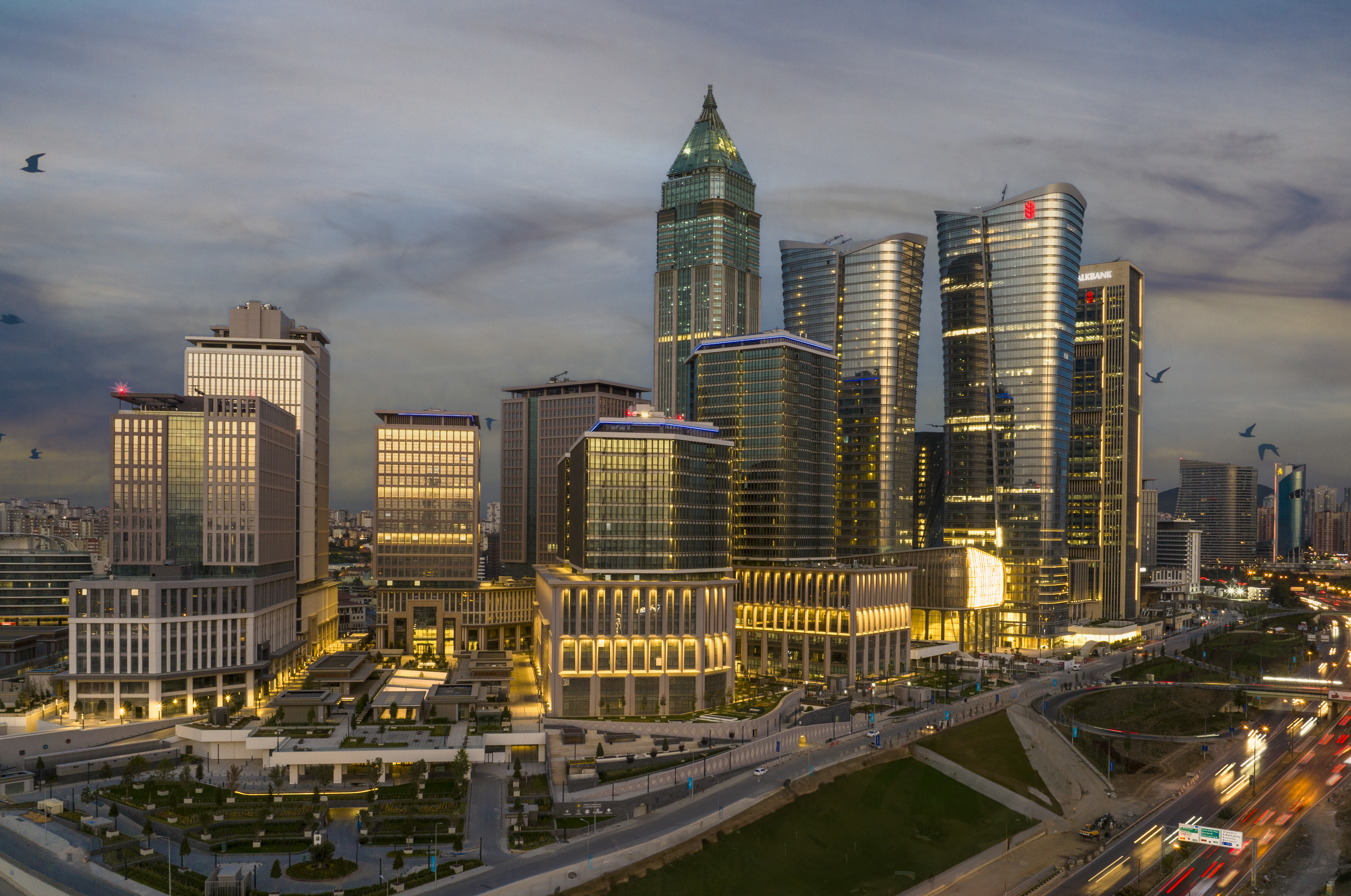
The Turkish Central Bank and other state-owned banks such as Ziraat Bank, VakıfBank and Halkbank have their new headquarters at the Istanbul Financial Center (IFC).

Many of Turkey's major manufacturing plants are located in the city. Istanbul and its surrounding province produce cotton, fruit, olive oil, silk, and tobacco. Food processing, textile production, oil products, rubber, metal ware, leather, chemicals, electronics, glass, machinery, paper and paper products, and alcoholic drinks are among the city's major industrial products. The city also has plants that assemble automobiles and trucks. Difficulties in the proximity of some of these varied business have been encountered in the past, such as the 2008 Istanbul fireworks explosion which was exacerbated by the close proximity of a paint factory.

To give enhancement to the textile industry the Istanbul Exporters Union, and textiles and clothing (ITKIB) was created in 1986, by the Secretariat for Foreign Trade, to facilitate the expansion and streamlining of export of textiles from Istanbul. In fact, the Union comprises four independent union representatives that are included in the Board ITKIB:

- Union of exporters of finished clothing;
- Union of exporters of textiles and raw materials;
- Union of exporters of leather and leather products;
- Union of exporters of carpets

Pharmaceutical industry started in 1952 with the establishment of "Eczacıbaşı Pharmaceuticals Factory" in Levent, Istanbul. Today, 134 companies operate in the Turkish pharmaceutical industry, a significant part of which is based within or near Istanbul.

== Tourism ==
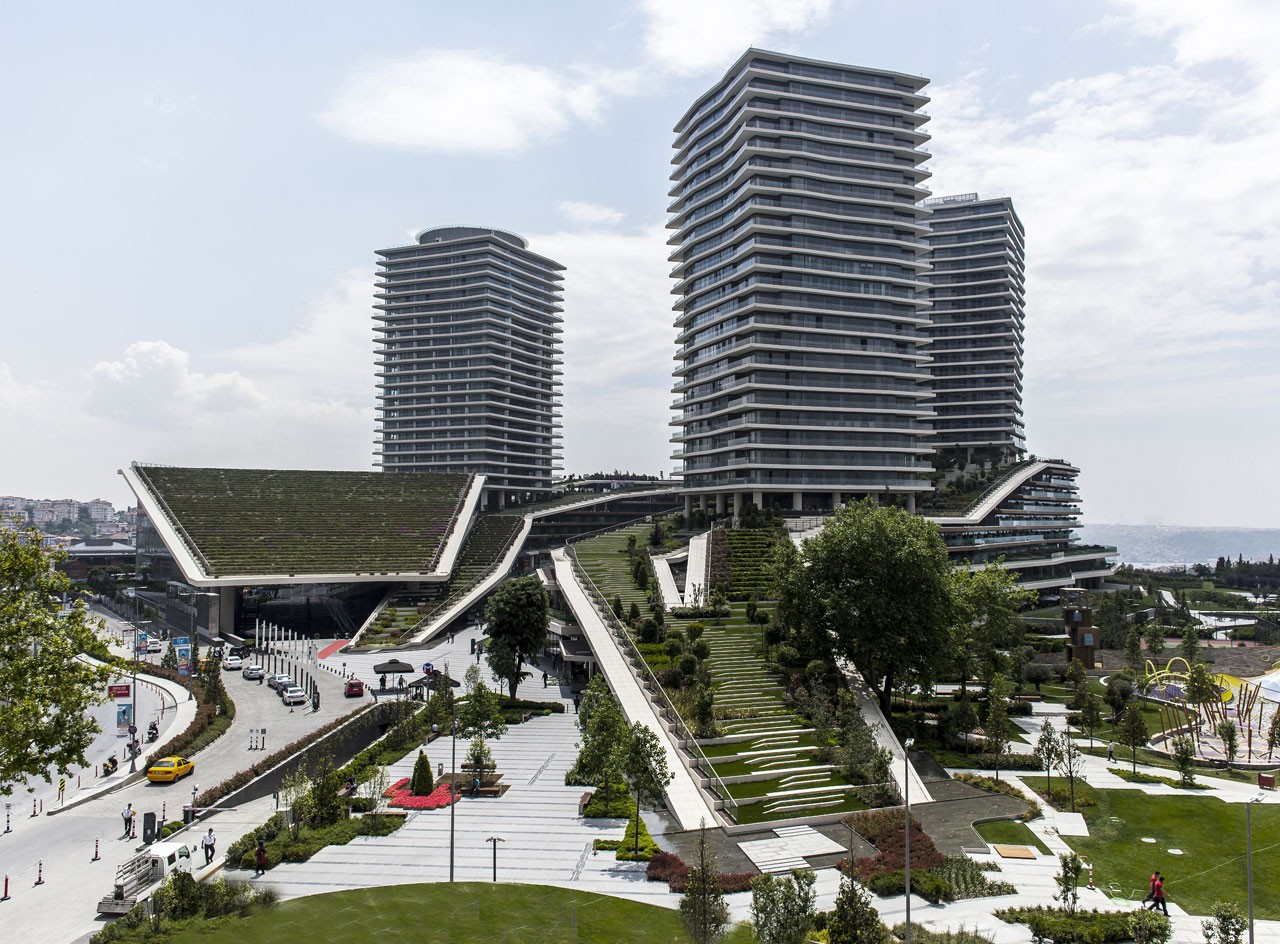
Zorlu Center in Istanbul

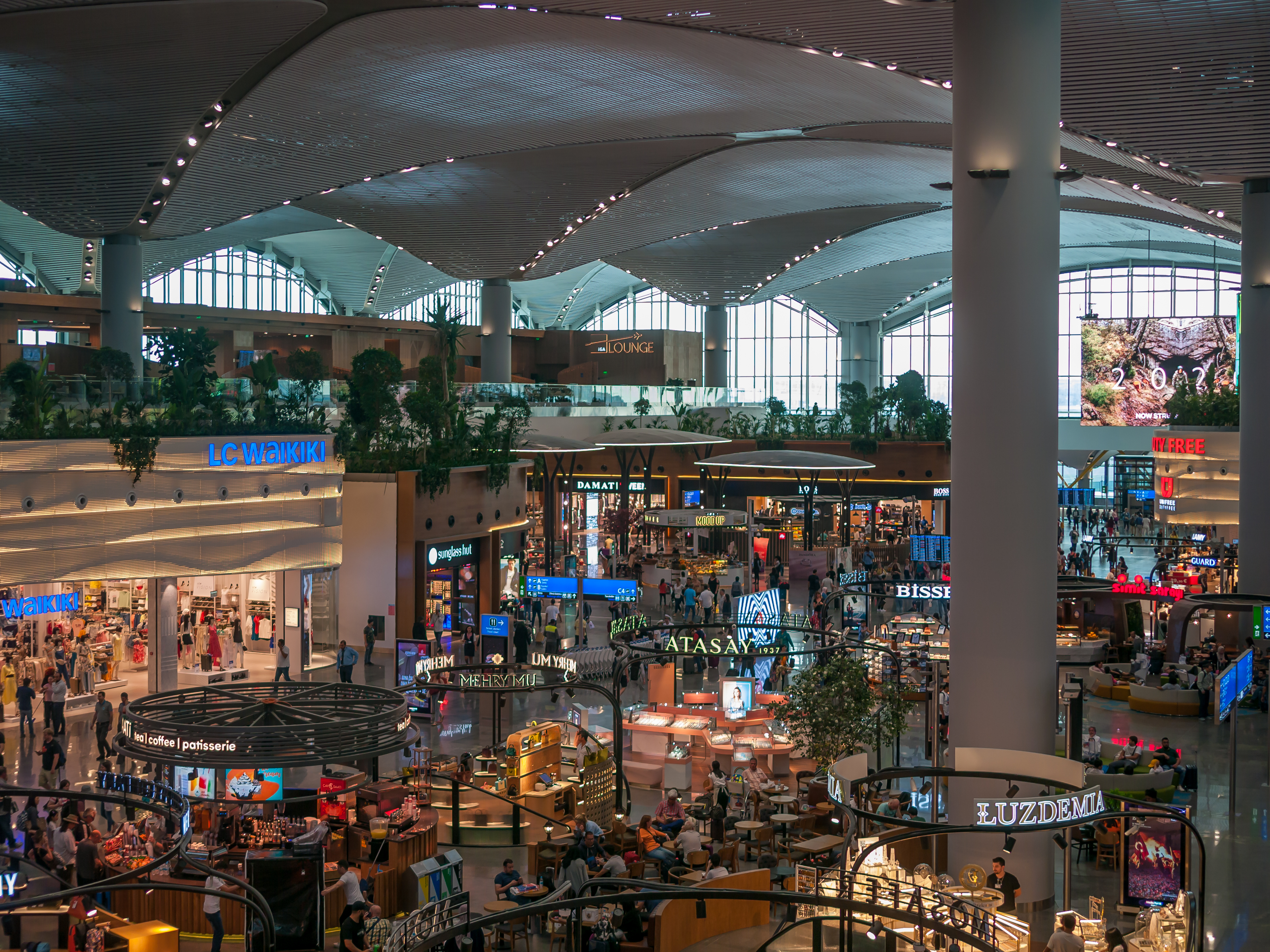
Istanbul Airport

Istanbul is one of the most important tourism spots of Turkey. There are thousands of hotels and other tourist oriented industries in the city, catering to both vacationers and visiting professionals. In 2006 a total of 23,148,669 tourists visited Turkey, most of whom entered the country through the airports and seaports of Istanbul and Antalya. The total number of tourists who entered Turkey through Atatürk International Airport and Sabiha Gökçen International Airport in Istanbul reached 5,346,658, rising from 4,849,353 in 2005. This number increased to 10.5 Million in 2011 with the booming Turkish tourism. In 2011, Istanbul's two international airports handled more than 50 Million passengers.

Istanbul is also one of the world's major conference destinations and is an increasingly popular choice for the world's leading international associations. Istanbul's conference appeal developed with three separate conference and exhibition areas: The "Conference Valley" (Istanbul Convention & Exhibition Center, Istanbul Hilton Convention & Exhibition Center, the Military Museum Cultural Center and the Cemal Reşit Rey Concert Hall); The Airport & Exhibition District (150,000 m2 (1.6 m sq ft) of exhibition space around the CNR International Expo Center); and the Business & Financial District (with many distributed centers). These cluster areas feature a combination of accommodations, meeting facilities, and exhibition space. They can be used individually, or collectively through transportation with the Istanbul metro, and are linked together for accommodating events with 10,000 or more participants.

== See also ==
- Economy of Turkey
- List of tallest buildings in Istanbul
- Utilities in Istanbul
- Public transport in Istanbul
- Istanbul Airport
