= Utilities in Istanbul =

Istanbul public utilities

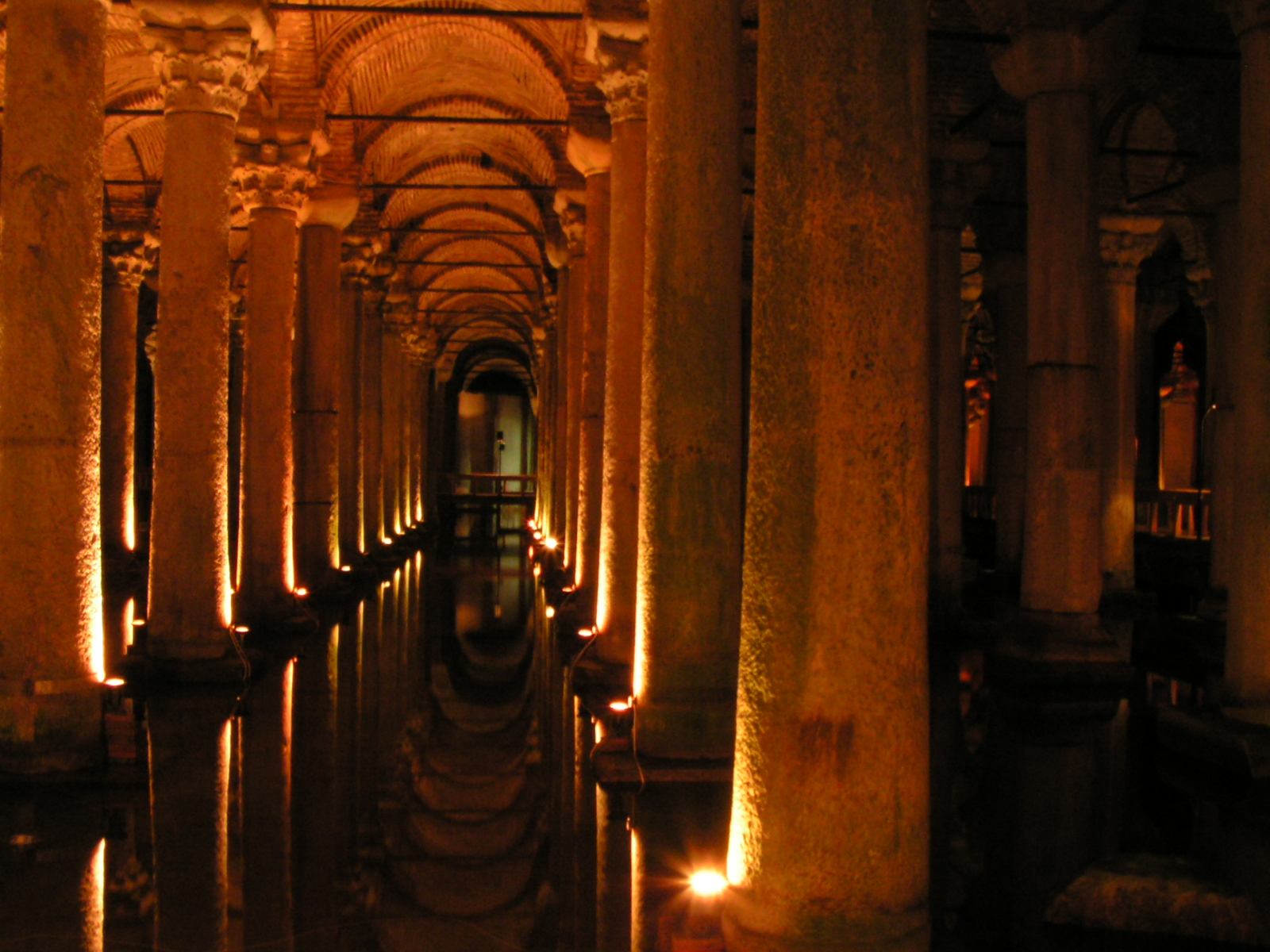
Basilica Cistern

Utilities in Istanbul covers the topic of public utility services in the city of Istanbul, Turkey.

== Water supply ==
The first water supply systems which were built in Istanbul date back to the foundation of the city. Two of the greatest aqueducts built in the Roman period are the Mazulkemer Aqueduct and the Valens Aqueduct. These aqueducts were built to channel water from the Halkalı area in the western edge of the city to the Beyazıt district in the city center, which was known as the Forum Tauri in the Roman period. After reaching the city center, the water was later collected in the city's numerous cisterns, such as the famous Philoxenos (Binbirdirek) Cistern and the Basilica (Yerebatan) Cistern.

Sultan Suleiman the Magnificent commissioned Mimar Sinan, his engineer and architect-in-chief, to improve the water needs of the city. Sinan constructed the Kırkçeşme Water Supply System in 1555. In later years, with the aim of responding to the ever-increasing public demand, water from various springs was channeled to the public fountains by small supply lines; see German Fountain.

Today, Istanbul has a chlorinated and filtered water supply and a sewage disposal system managed by the government agency İSKİ. There are also several private sector organizations distributing clean water.

== Electricity in Istanbul ==
Electricity distribution services are covered by the state-owned TEK. The first electricity production plant in the city, Silahtarağa Termik Santrali, was established in 1914 and continued to supply electricity until 1983.

In 2013, Turkey completed the privatization of its 21 electicity distribution companies.

== Post and telecommunications ==
The Ottoman Ministry of Post and Telegraph was established in the city on October 23, 1840. The first post office was the Postahane-i Amire near the courtyard of the New Mosque. In 1876 the first international mailing network between Istanbul and the lands beyond the vast Ottoman Empire—which, in that year, stretched from the borders with Austria-Hungary and Russia at north to the Ottoman provinces of Yemen and Sudan at south and Tunisia at west—was established. In 1901 the first money transfers were made through the post offices and the first cargo services became operational.

=== Electric telegraph ===
Samuel Morse received his first-ever patent for the telegraph in 1847, at the old Beylerbeyi Palace (the present Beylerbeyi Palace was built in 1861–1865 on the same location) in Istanbul, which was issued by Sultan Abdülmecid I who personally tested the invention. Following this successful test, installation works of the first telegraph line between Istanbul and Edirne began on August 9, 1847. In 1855 the Telegraph Administration was established.

=== Telephone ===
In July 1881, the first telephone circuit in Istanbul was established between the Ministry of Post and Telegraph in Soğukçeşme and the Postahane-i Amire in Yenicami. On May 23, 1909, the first manual telephone exchange with a 50 line capacity was established in the Büyük Postane (Grand Post Office) in Sirkeci.

=== Modern communications ===
The first automatic telex exchange was established in November 1973. Electronic Mail was put into service between Istanbul, Ankara, İzmir and Adana on June 28, 1984. In November 1985 the first radio link system was put into service between Istanbul and Ankara. On October 23, 1986, mobile telephone and paging systems were put into service in Istanbul, Ankara and İzmir. On March 4, 1987, the first ever video conference in Europe was realized in Istanbul. On February 23, 1994, GSM technology was established in the city. A nationwide Internet network and connection with the World Wide Web was established in 1996.

== See also ==
- Economy of Istanbul
- Basilica Cistern
