= Hotels in Istanbul =

This article provides information on the hotels in Istanbul, Turkey, including history of the hospitality industry in the city, brief overview of the current status of Istanbul's hospitality industry, information on the local hotels, as well as information on the international chain hotels in the city.

== History ==
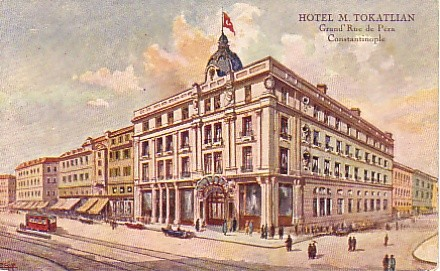
Historic "Hotel M. Tokatlıyan" in Beyoğlu.

Contemporary hotel management in Istanbul started in the second half of the 19th century, as the Orient Express extended its non-stop service from Paris to Istanbul on 1 June 1889 (with Istanbul becoming one of the two original endpoints of the timetabled service of the Orient Express) and the city became, as a result, a tourist destination. In 1892, a group of local investors, in partnership with the Wagons-Lits company, opened Hotel Pera Palace in Beyoğlu district, which was designed by the famous Levantine architect of Istanbul, Alexander Vallaury. Also in 1892, The Grand Hotel de Londres was opened by two local partners, L. Adamopoulos and N. Aperghis, in the place of the former residence of the Glavany family in Beyoğlu. Shortly afterwards, a series of hotels, including Bristol Hotel (1893) and "Hotel M. Tokatlıyan" (1897), were opened in the same district.

While the new hotels were being opened in Beyoğlu district, Sirkeci quarter within the old city quickly adapted to this new tendency and the old inns in the neighbourhood were gradually transformed into hotels at the beginning of the 20th century. Other districts of the city followed this trend and the number of hotels in Istanbul was more than 50 in the year 1910.

Similar progress occurred in the following years in the cities of İzmir and Ankara, while the development of hotel management was relatively slow in the rest of Anatolian cities.

During the Republican era, in the 1950s, opening of hotels of various types gained speed. The most important event of this period was the opening of Hilton Istanbul Bosphorus in 1954. As a result of the development of transportation and the domestic/outbound tourism, numerous new hotels were opened in the 1960s. The same development continued during the 1970s and 1980s as well, with this period seeing the opening of such large 5-star hotels as Sheraton Istanbul and Etap Marmara (later rebranded as Ceylan InterContinental Istanbul and The Marmara Taksim hotels, respectively).

In the 1990s and 2000s, along with the rapid development of different categories of tourism in the country, such as the congress tourism, the health tourism, the religious tourism, etc., a new wave of hotel openings took place in the city. Hotels opened during this period of time included, among many others, Conrad Istanbul Bosphorus, Four Seasons Istanbul Hotel in Sultanahmet, Ritz-Carlton Istanbul Hotel and Sheraton Istanbul Maslak Hotel.

Currently, there are numerous ongoing and planned hotel projects at various stages of development aimed at meeting the rising demand for accommodation generated by the global touristic status of Istanbul as the 9th most visited city in the world by the number of international tourist arrivals and the 9th most popular congress destination in the world.

With 11.842.983 million international visitors visiting Istanbul in the year 2014 (registering a 13.1% year-on-year increase compared with the previous year), the number of international visitors to Istanbul increased a further 7.5% in the first eight months of 2015, reaching 8.414.096 million international visitors to the city during the January–August 2015 period of time.

== Brief information ==
Every possible accommodation style is available in Istanbul, from the hostel dormitories and mid-range hotels to the world-class luxury hotels. Although reasonable compared to the European standards, the rates are more expensive than in the rest of the country.

While the majority of the 5-star hotels concentrate within modern districts like Beyoğlu, Şişli and Beşiktaş, the 4-star hotels are generally located within the historical peninsula. The majority of hotels generally congregate in the vicinity of Sultanahmet and Hagia Sophia. Numerous hotels occupying historical buildings are situated in this district. Budget hotels are generally found in, both, modern and historical districts.

In 2006, the total number of tourism operation licensed hotels in Istanbul were 283. Of the 283 hotels, 28 were 5-star, 63 were 4-star, 81 were 3-star, 91 were 2-star hotels, and 20 were 1-star hotels. Additionally, there were 55 other accommodation establishments in the city, mainly consisting of special licence hotels, motels, camping grounds, boarding houses, aparts, and boutique hotels.

At the end of 2010, according to the data of the Association of the Touristic Hotels and Investors (TUROB) of the Republic of Turkey, 766 accommodation establishments of different categories in Istanbul (licensed by the Ministry of Tourism and Culture of Turkey and/or the municipality of Istanbul) had the total of 46,652 rooms and 93,299 beds. That capacity alone was sufficient to accommodate the annual volume of 10 million tourists.

At the same time, another 51 new hotels (of which 25 were 5-star hotels) were at various stages of development at the end of 2010, soon to add another 9,512 rooms and 19,800 beds to the already existing capacity. With the completion of these new hotels, Istanbul's accommodation capacity will have reached, within a few years, the total of 817 hotels, 56,164 rooms and 113,99 beds.

== Notable hotels ==
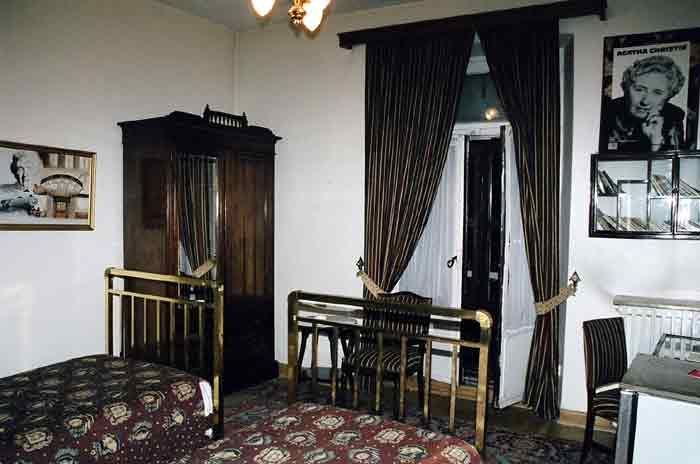
Room 411 in Hotel Pera Palace, where Agatha Christie wrote Murder on the Orient Express.

The following list provides brief information about some notable hotels in Istanbul located in the historical buildings:

- Çırağan Palace Kempinski Istanbul Hotel
- Ecole St. Pierre Hotel
- Four Seasons Hotel Istanbul Old City
- Four Seasons Hotel Bosphorus
- Hotel Pera Palace, Jumeirah
- Hotel Yeşil Ev
- Legacy Ottoman Hotel
- Raffles Istanbul
- Wyndham Istanbul Old City

== Local hotels ==
While many of the locally-branded hotels which are operated by the local Turkish hotel chains or investors are built by individual investors, several national hotel chains dominate the local hotels market. These local hotel chains include Titanic Hotels (operating 5 hotels in Istanbul), Tempo Hotels (operating 5 hotels in Istanbul), The Green Park Hotels (operating 4 hotels in Istanbul), Dedeman Hotels (operating 4 hotels in Istanbul), The House Hotels (operating 4 hotels in Istanbul), The Sofa Hotel In the pulsating heart of the city, a member of prestigious Design Hotels™ chain and one of Europe’s top 10 art hotels.Divan Hotels (operating 4 hotels in Istanbul), Elite World Hotels (operating 4 hotels in Istanbul), The Marmara Collection Hotels (operating 3 hotels in Istanbul), etc.

== International chain hotels ==
The international chain hotels market in Istanbul dates back to 1955 when Hilton Hotels chain opened its first international hotel outside the U.S., in Istanbul, on 10 June 1955. The opening was hosted by the founder of Hilton Hotels chain, Conrad Hilton, and saw the attendance of the retinue of international celebrities specially invited to Istanbul for the opening, including Olivia de Havilland, Irene Dunne, Sonja Henie, Ann Miller, Terry Moore, and many others. To this day, Hilton Istanbul Bosphorus holds the distinct eminence of being the longest operating Hilton hotel outside the U.S.

60 years later, Istanbul retains its strong attraction for the international hotel chains as the 9th most visited city in the world by the number of international tourist arrivals and the 9th most popular congress destination in the world, hosting, as of September 2015, 106 operating international chain hotels, with further 31 such hotels scheduled to open before late 2017 (detailed data for these hotels is listed in the table which follows below).

With 11.842.983 million international visitors visiting Istanbul in the year 2014 (registering a 13.1% year-on-year increase compared with the previous year), the number of international visitors to Istanbul increased a further 7.5% in the first eight months of 2015, reaching 8.414.096 million international visitors to the city during the January–August 2015 period of time.

The international chain hotels market in Istanbul is well structured, encompassing the entire range of accommodation offerings, from the quality budget hotels (Best Western, Ibis, Hampton by Hilton, etc.) to the luxury Far East hotel chains (Shangri-La, Mandarin Oriental, Raffles, etc.)

Contemporary hotel chains/brands W (of Starwood parent company) and Edition (of Marriott parent company) opened their first hotels in Europe in Istanbul (W in April 2008 and Edition in February 2011), whereas the Viceroy Hotel Group will also debut its first European hotel in Istanbul in mid 2016. The French chain of chic, Philippe Starck-designed hotels, Mama Shelter Hotels, opened its first hotel outside France in Istanbul (after the hotels in Paris, Marseille, Lyon and Bordeaux), while the Qatari Retaj chain of hotels also opened its first hotel in Europe in Istanbul (after the hotels in Qatar and Comoros). The Thailand-based chain of hotels, U Hotels and Resorts, announced the opening of its first European hotel in Istanbul in early 2016, after the hotels in Thailand, Indonesia, India, Laos and Vietnam.

The essential attraction of the city for the global hotel chains is further underlined by the fact that, as of September 2015, out of 57 international hotel chains/brands established in Istanbul, 27 of them (or 47.3%) had more than one hotel in the city.

== See also ==
- Lists of hotels – an index of hotel list articles on Wikipedia
