= Pera Palace Hotel =

Museum hotel in Beyoğlu, Istanbul, Turkey

Coordinates: 41°01′52″N 28°58′25″E

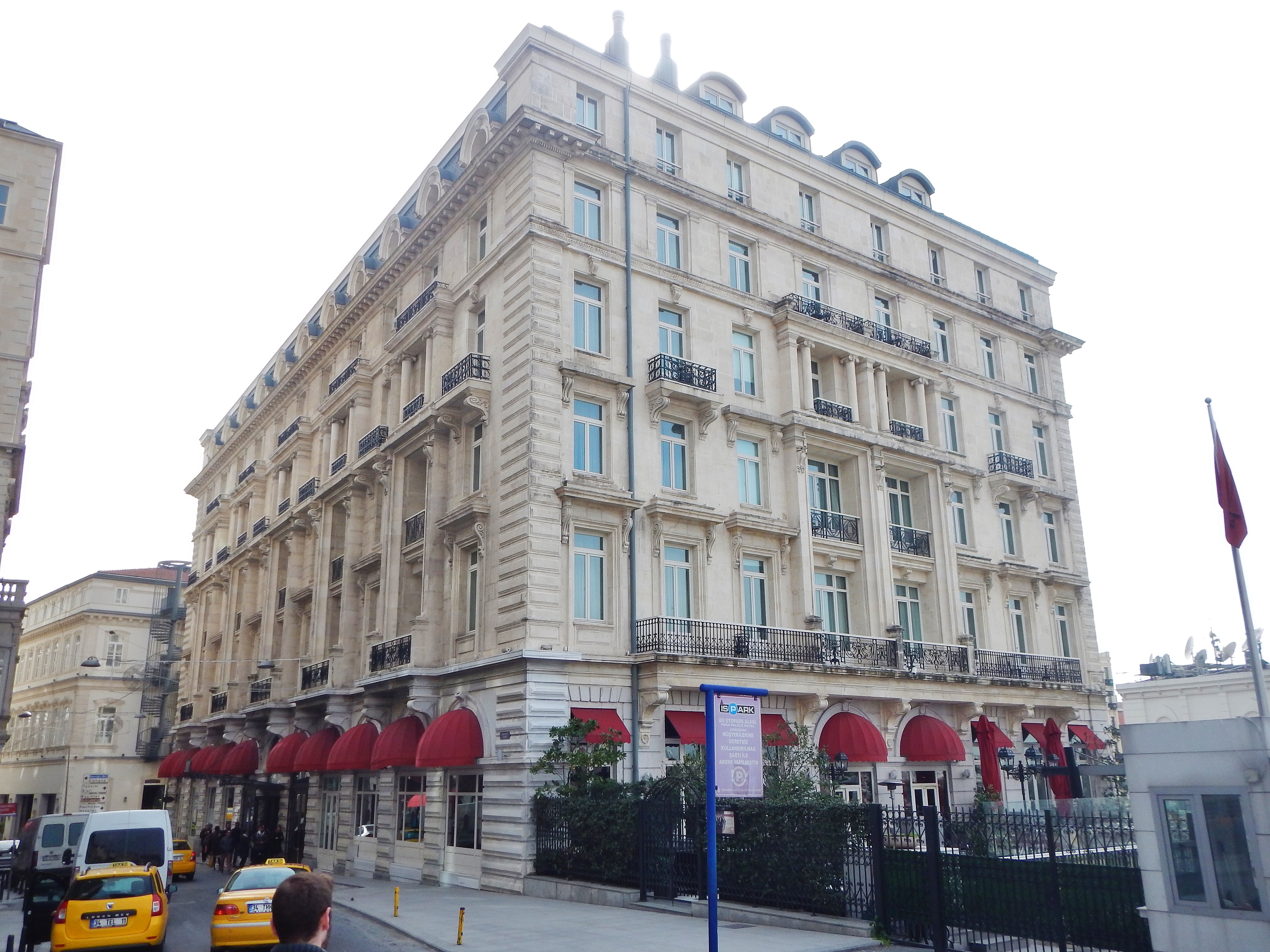
- Interactive map of the Pera Palace Hotel area

General information
- Location: Beyoğlu, Istanbul, Turkey
- Opened: 1895; 126 years ago
- Owner: Jumeirah Hotels (2012–2017)

Design and construction
- Architect: Alexander Vallaury

Other information
- Number of rooms: 115
- Number of suites: 16
- Number of restaurants: 1

Website
- perapalace.com/en/

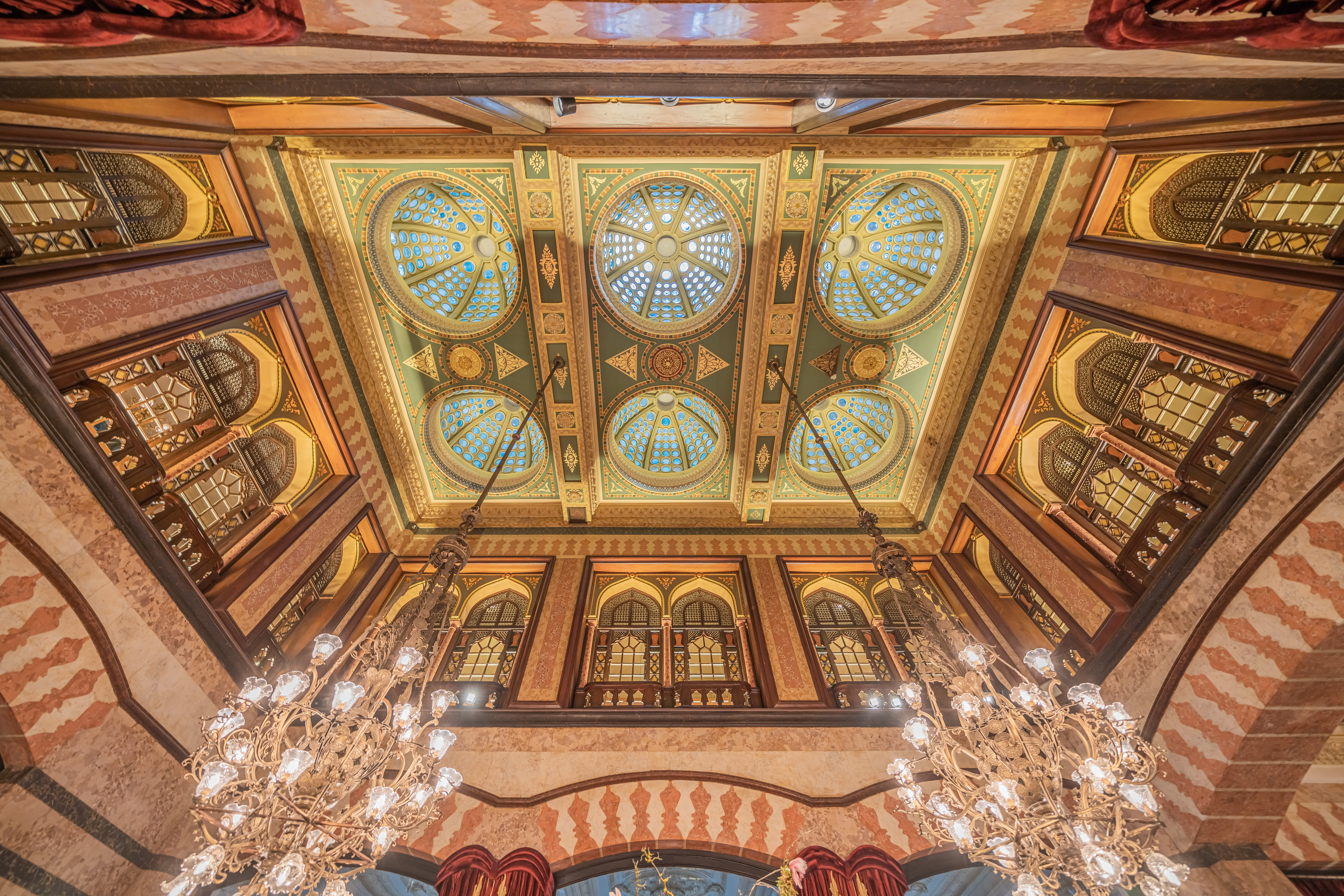
Ceiling of the hotel

The Pera Palace Hotel (Turkish: Pera Palas Oteli) is a historic luxury hotel in the Beyoğlu (Pera) district in Istanbul, Turkey. It opened in 1895 to host passengers from the Orient Express and was named after the local district. It is the oldest European hotel in Turkey.

== History ==
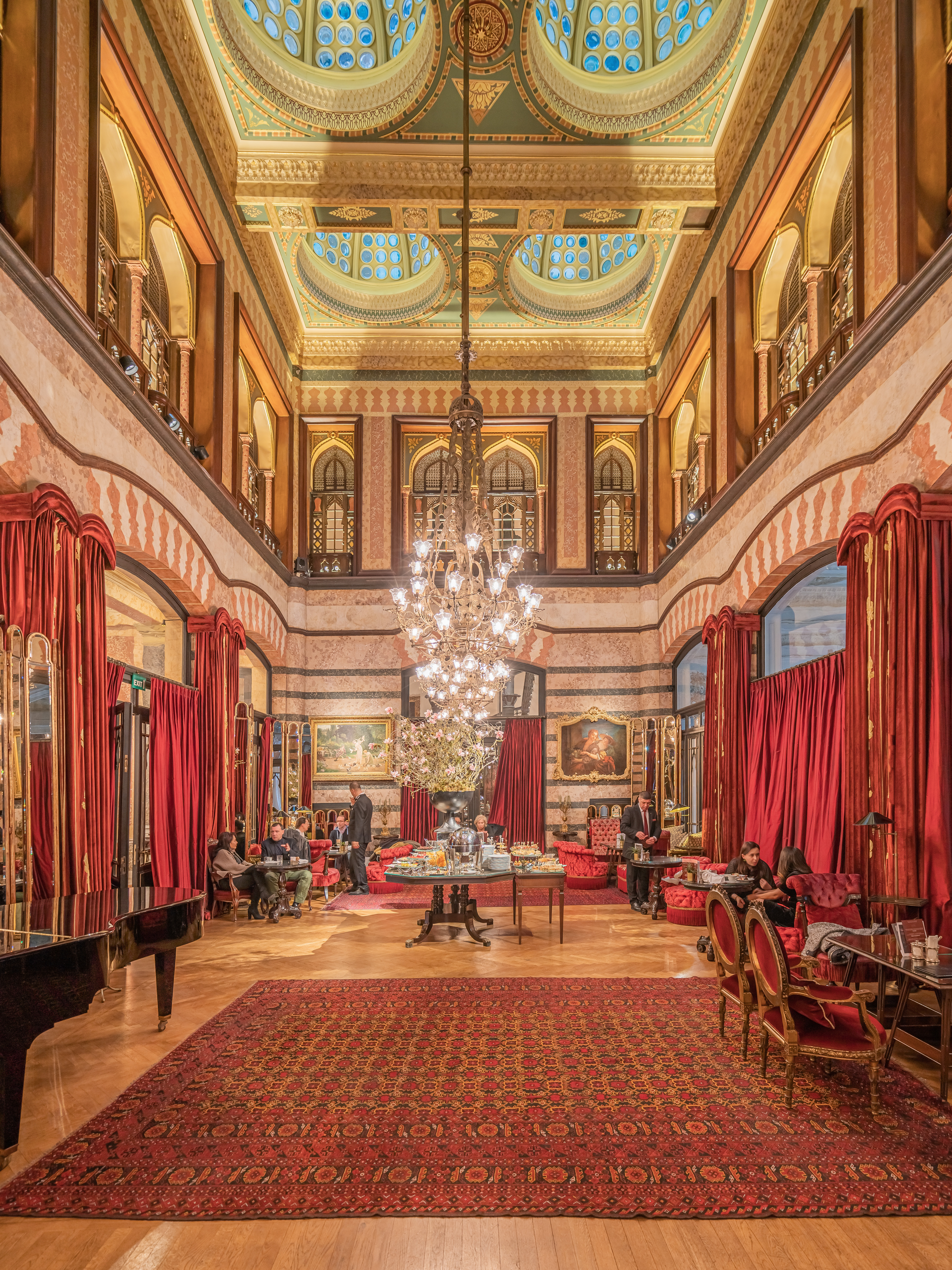
Interior of the hotel

Construction began in 1892 and the grand opening ball was held in 1895. Alexandre Vallaury, a French-Ottoman architect living in the city designed the hotel in a blend of neo-classical, Art Nouveau and oriental styles. Vallaury undertook a number of other projects in Constantinople (now Istanbul), including the Ottoman Bank Headquarters and the Imperial Museum.

The hotel was the first building in the Ottoman Empire to be powered by electricity, other than the imperial palaces. It was also the only address in the city to provide hot running water for its guests and contained the first electric elevator in Constantinople (the second electric elevator in all of Europe).

One of the hotel's first owners were the Ottoman Armenian Esayan family.

The hotel was damaged in a bomb attack on 11 March 1941, which killed five people, including four Turkish nationals and a British diplomatic worker, and injured 30 others. Two hotel porters were among the victims killed. The bombs originated in the luggage room, in suitcases brought by staff of the British Legation in Sofia led by Ambassador George William Rendel, who survived the attack, when they moved to Istanbul following the severing of diplomatic relations with Bulgaria during World War II.

The hotel closed in 2006 for a major restoration. In April 2008, the Beşiktas Shipping Group launched the €23 million project. KA.BA Conservation of Historic Buildings and Architecture directed the project alongside the Metex Design Group and the hotel reopened on 1 September 2010.

The hotel was managed by Jumeirah Hotels as Pera Palace Hotel Jumeirah from 1 May 2012 to 2017.

== Architecture ==
The Pera Palace Hotel is listed as a historical building under the general protection of Turkish Law (No. 2863 of 1983, amended with Law No. 5226 of 2004) concerning cultural heritage in Turkey.

The exterior façade, as well as the layout of the property, follows a neo-classical approach. The interiors of the building feature a more oriental style, mostly concentrated in the ballroom interior. In keeping with this eclectic vision, art nouveau lines feature in and around the elevator and in the coffee house section.

A key attraction, the Atatürk Room 101 remains as a 'Museum Room', with many personal items and reading material of the founding leader of Turkey, Mustafa Kemal Atatürk exhibited to the public.

== Location ==
The Pera Palace Hotel is located in the Tepebaşı neighbourhood of Pera, once known as "Little Europe". It is about 38 km (24 mi) from Istanbul Airport. The hotel is in walking distance of Istiklal Avenue, Taksim Square and numerous foreign consulates.

== Literature and publications ==
- In Ernest Hemingway's short story The Snows of Kilimanjaro, the main character, writer Harry, stays at the Pera Palace Hotel while serving in the military during the Allied occupation of Constantinople in World War I.
- Henry Pulling and his aunt Augusta Bertram, protagonists of Graham Greene's 1969 novel, Travels with My Aunt, stay at the Pera Palace Hotel during their Istanbul adventure. The narrator Pulling is not enthusiastic about the quality of the food served.
- Detective writer Agatha Christie's 1934 novel Murder on the Orient Express was allegedly written in the Pera Palace Hotel. The hotel maintains Christie's room as a memorial to the author.
- The characters of Lainie and Celia in Erin Morgenstern's 2011 fantasy novel The Night Circus stay at the Pera Palace Hotel in 1900.
- The ball event mentioned in Fatih-Harbiye written by Peyami Safa is scheduled in Pera Palace.

== In popular culture ==
- The hotel serves as the main setting for the show Midnight at the Pera Palace, which was released on Netflix in March 2022.
- The hotel is where Tilda Swinton's character stays in Istanbul in the film Three Thousand Years of Longing.

== See also ==
- Hotels in Istanbul
