= The Pearl Island =

Artificial island in Doha, Qatar

The Pearl Island جزيرة اللؤلؤة
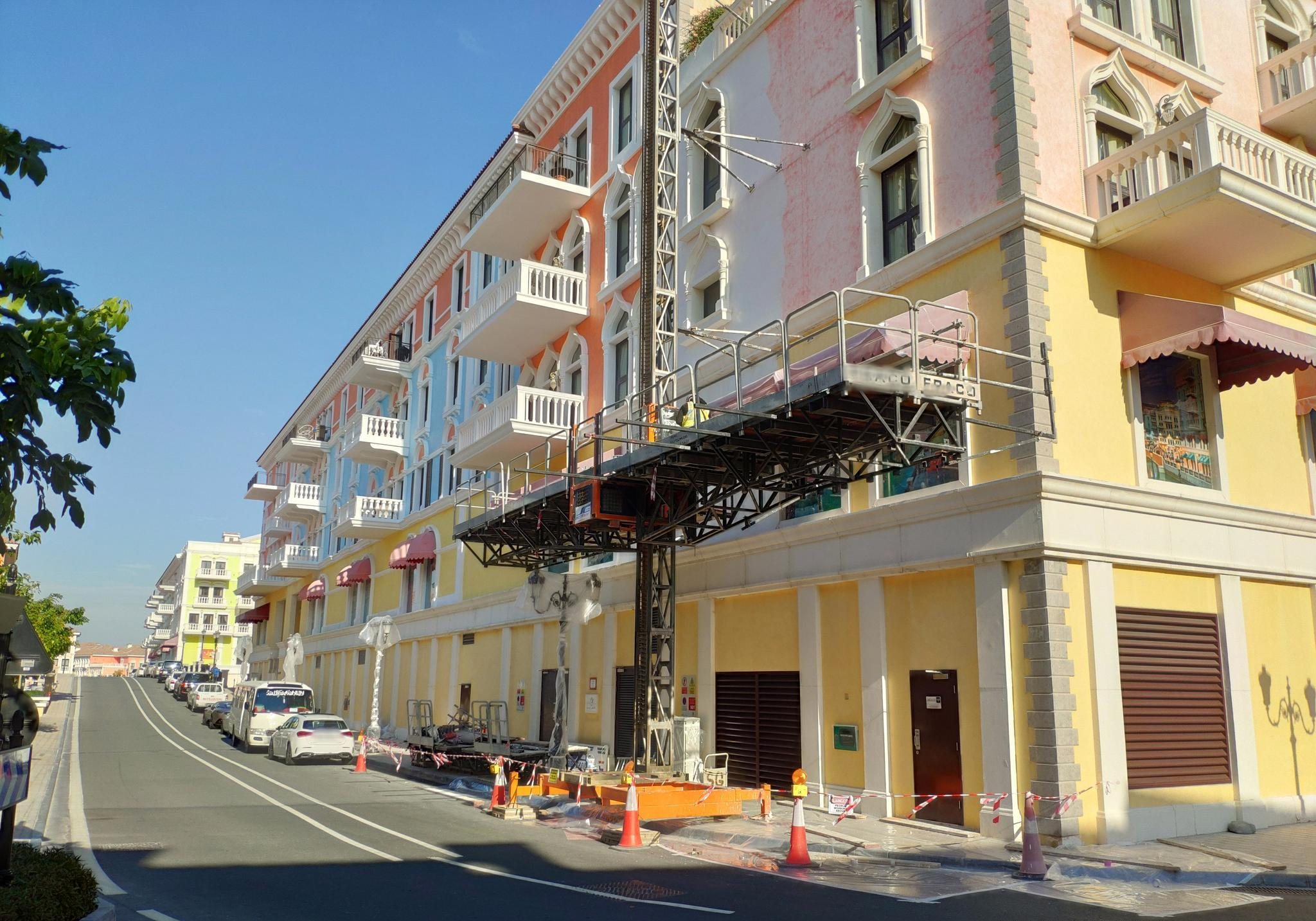
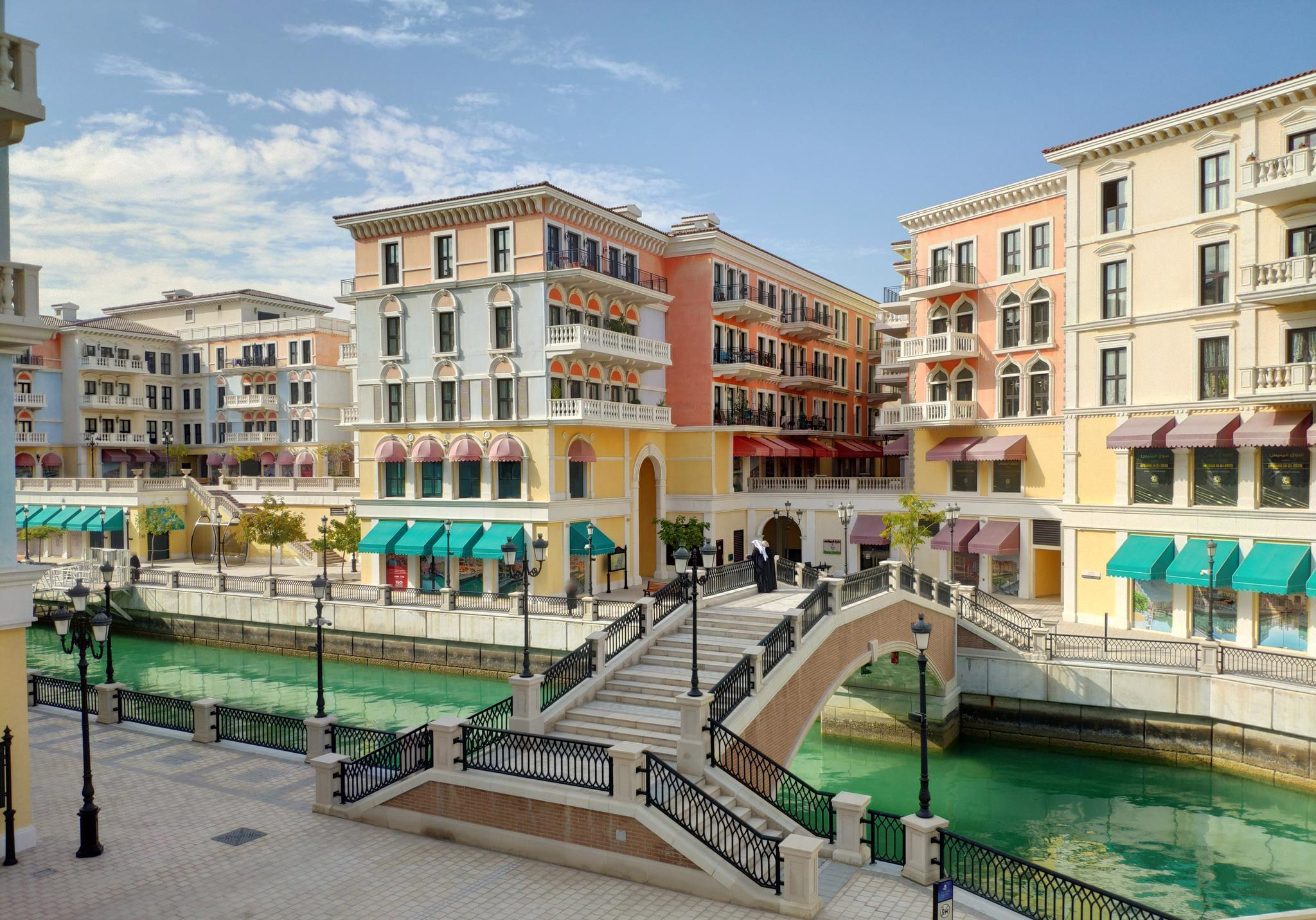
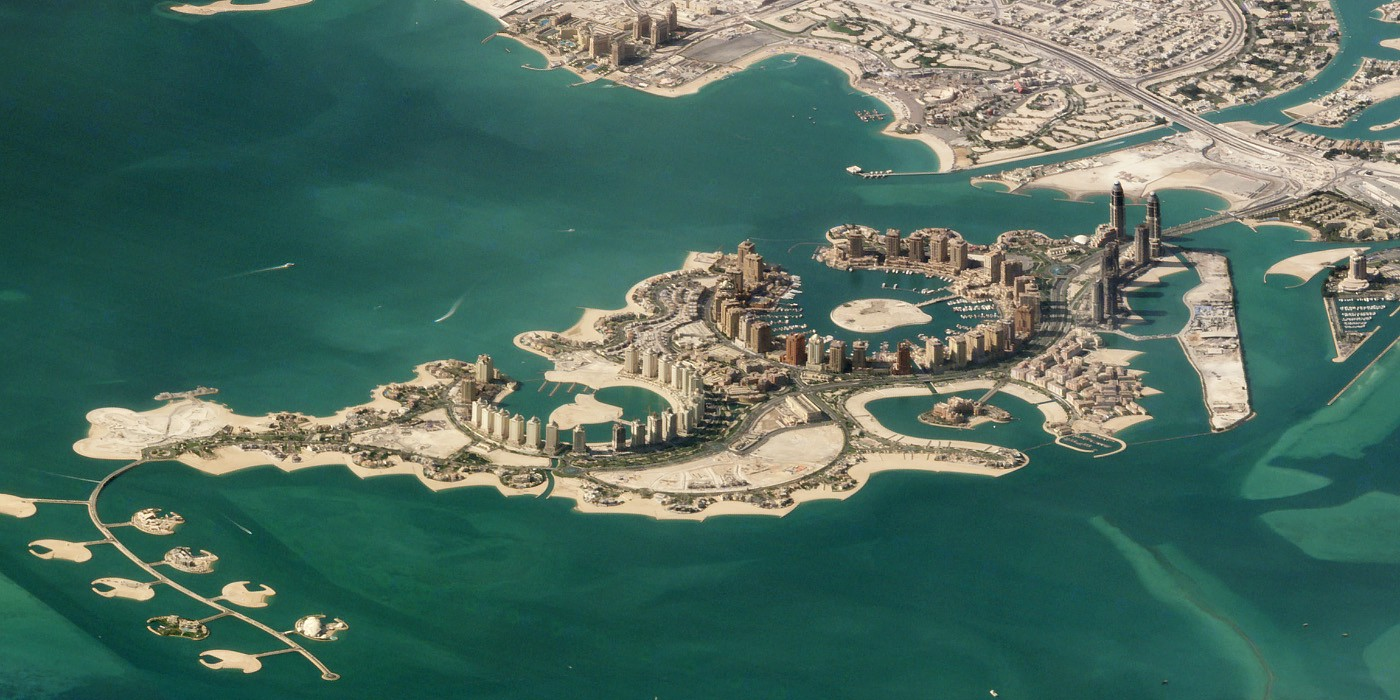
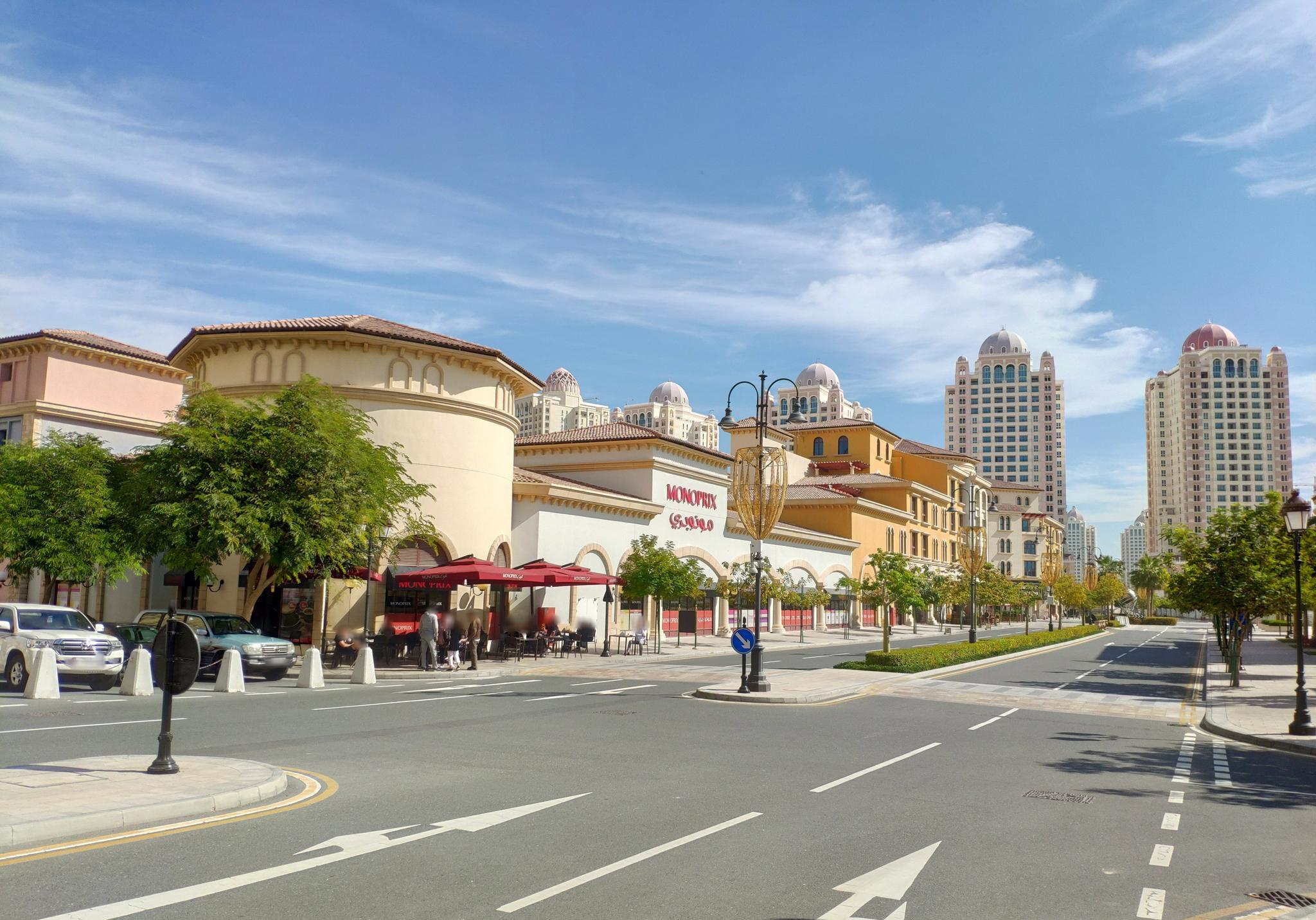
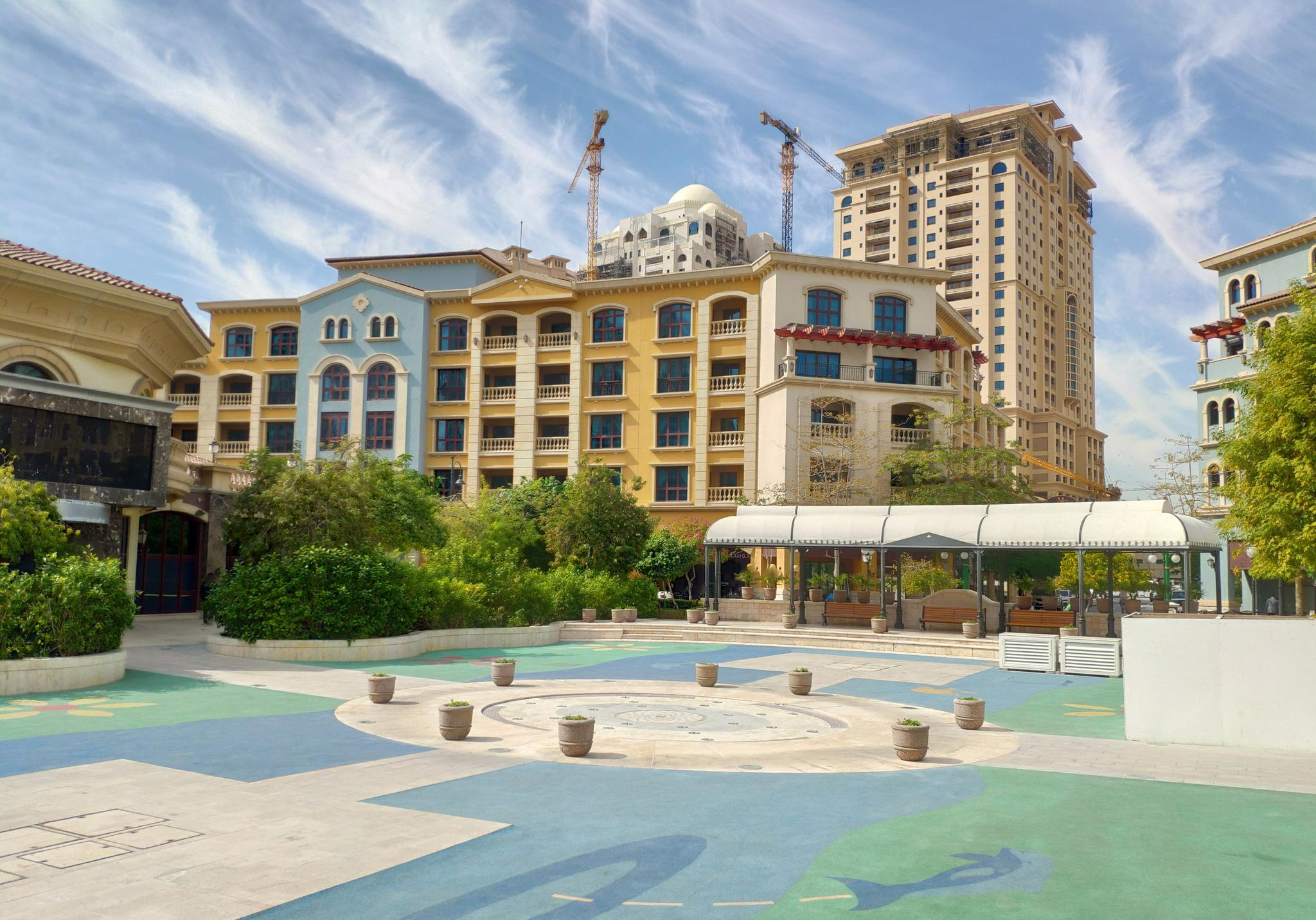
- Top to Bottom, Left to Right: Building under construction at Qanat Quartier, A view of the canal in Qanat Quartier, Satellite view of The Pearl in 2017, Monoprix at Medina Centrale, Plaza with benches

- The Pearl Island
- Coordinates: 25°22′7″N 51°33′7″E
- Country: Qatar
- Municipality: Doha
- Zone: Zone 66
- District no.: 765

Area
  - Total: 13.9 km^{2} (5.4 sq mi)
  - Land: 4 km^{2} (1.5 sq mi)

Population (2024)
  - Total: 52,000
  - Density: 13,000/km^{2} (34,000/sq mi)
- Website: Official website

The Pearl Island, when completed

The Pearl Island (Arabic: جزيرة اللؤلؤة, romanized: jazīrat al-lu'lu'a) in Doha, Qatar, is an artificial island with an area of nearly 4 square kilometres (1.5 sq mi). It was the first land in Qatar to be available for freehold ownership by foreign nationals. The Pearl created 32 kilometres (20 mi) of new coastline, and by 2024 it had around 52,000 residents.

In 2004, when the project was first revealed, the initial cost of constructing the island stood at $2.5 billion. This figure was later revised to approximately $15 billion upon completion.

== Residential development ==
Residential development on the island is intended to incorporate various national and international themes, including aspects of Arabic, Mediterranean, and European culture. The Pearl Island is divided into 12 districts (also referred to as precincts), each of which has a distinct architectural style.

=== Porto Arabia Towers ===
The total number of towers is 31, with a total of 4,700 apartments. The address format is Unit 1234, 1 Porto Arabia. Some references use PA-1 for convenience.

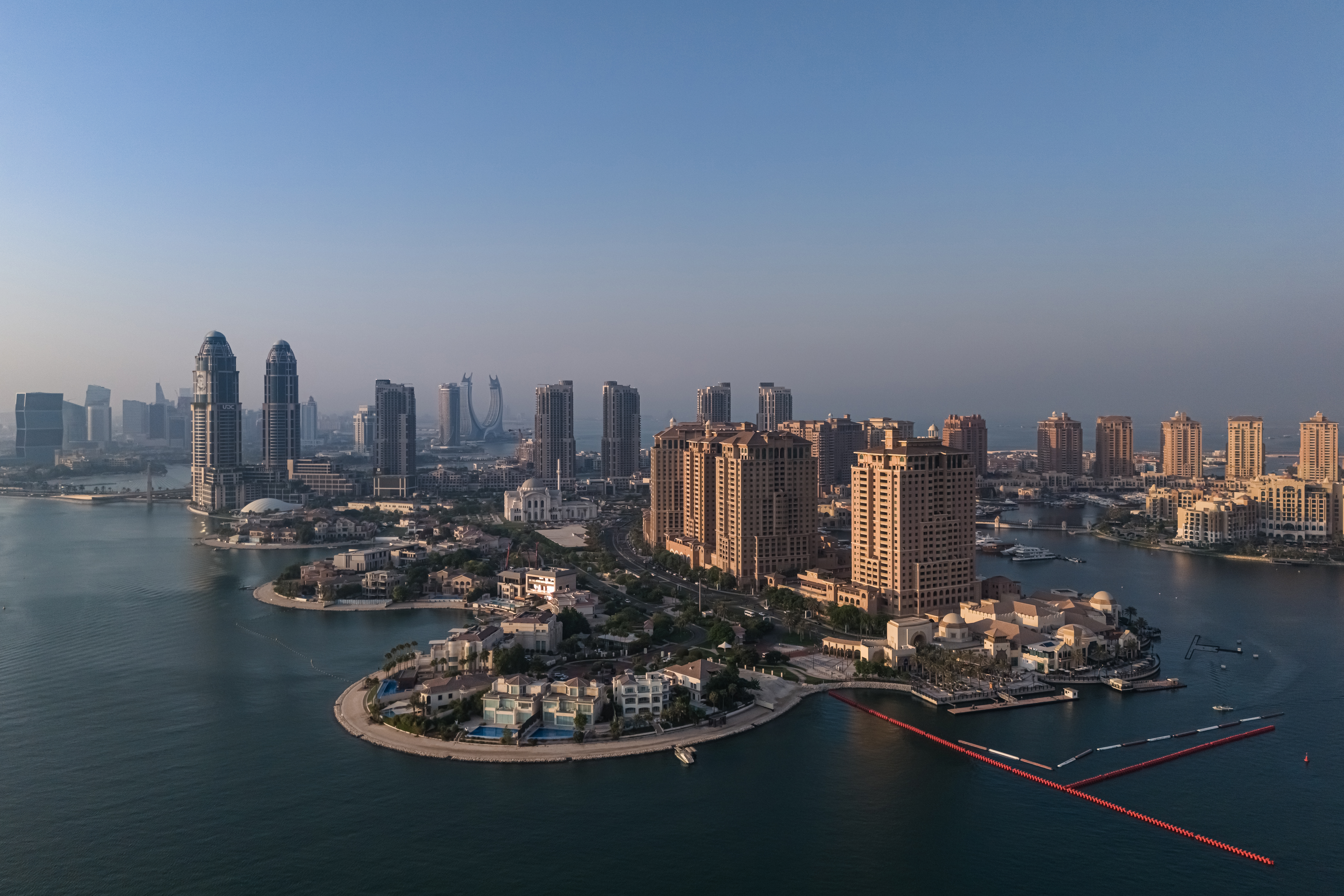
Aerial view of Porto Arabia (foreground)

Tower Number	Parcel	Tower Name	Developer	Status
1	1	One (Alfardan)	UDC	Complete
2	2A	Two	UDC	Complete
3	2B		UDC	Complete
4	3A	California	UDC	Complete
5	3B	Florida	UDC	Complete
6	4	Tower Six	UDC	Complete Summer 2009
7	5	Tower Seven	UDC	Complete
8, 9, 10	6A, C, D	Sabban	Sabban	Complete
11	7A	United	UDC	Complete
12	7B		UDC	Under construction. Structure complete.
13	8A		The Land	Complete
14	8B	Tuscan	The Land	Complete January 2011
15	9A	Monaco	The Land	Complete
16	9B	Tuscan / VIP	The Land	Complete September 2010
17	10A	Monaco	The Land	In construction. Outside almost complete.
18	10B	Tuscan	The Land	Complete
19	11A	La Riviera	First Qatar	Complete
20	11B	Monaco	The Land	Complete
21	12	Jumanah Tower 2	Al Bandary Real Estate	Complete
22	13A		UDC	Concrete structure almost complete (Feb 2013).
23	13B		UDC	Concrete structure almost complete (Feb 2013).
24	14A	Denata / Denat Qatar	Capital Investment / Asteco	Complete
25	14B		H.H.Shk.Srour Bui Mohamed Al Nahyan, Mr. Ali Ibrah	Complete
26	15A		H.H.Shk.Srour Bui Mohamed Al Nahyan, Mr. Ali Ibrah	Complete
27	15B		The Land	Complete
28	16A	Jumana	Salam Bounain	Complete
29	16B	29		Complete
30	17	Burj Elegante		Complete July 2012.
31	18	31	UDC	Complete

=== Viva Bahriya Towers ===
There will be 29 towers in total. The address format is "Unit 1234, 1 Viva Bahriya", with "VB‑1" being the shorter, convenient version.

Tower Number	Tower Name	Developer	Status
1			Construction not started
2			
3	Imperial Ruby	Durrat Al Doha / QIB	In construction
4	Imperial Diamond	Durrat Al Doha / QIB	In construction
5	Casablanca	Durrat Al Doha / QIB	Complete January 2018
6	Imperial Opal	Durrat Al Doha / QIB	In construction
7			Complete
10	Bilal Pearl Suites	AHB	Complete December 2011
11	Imperial	UDC	
12		The Land	
13		The Land	
14		The Land	Complete
15		The Land	
16		The Land	Construction not started
17	Imperial	Qatar Airways	
18		Asteco	Complete Autumn 2011
19	Regency Pearl IV	Al Asmakh Real Estate	Opened January 2019
20	Turquoise		Complete
21	Imperial Emerald	Durrat Al Doha	Complete
22	VB22	Qatar Coral	In construction. Expected June 2013.
23	VB23	Qatar Coral	In construction. Expected June 2013.
26	Regency Pearl V	Al Asmakh Real Estate	Complete
27		UDC	Complete
28		UDC	In construction
29	Costa del Sol	UDC	Complete May 2011

=== Qanat Quartier ===
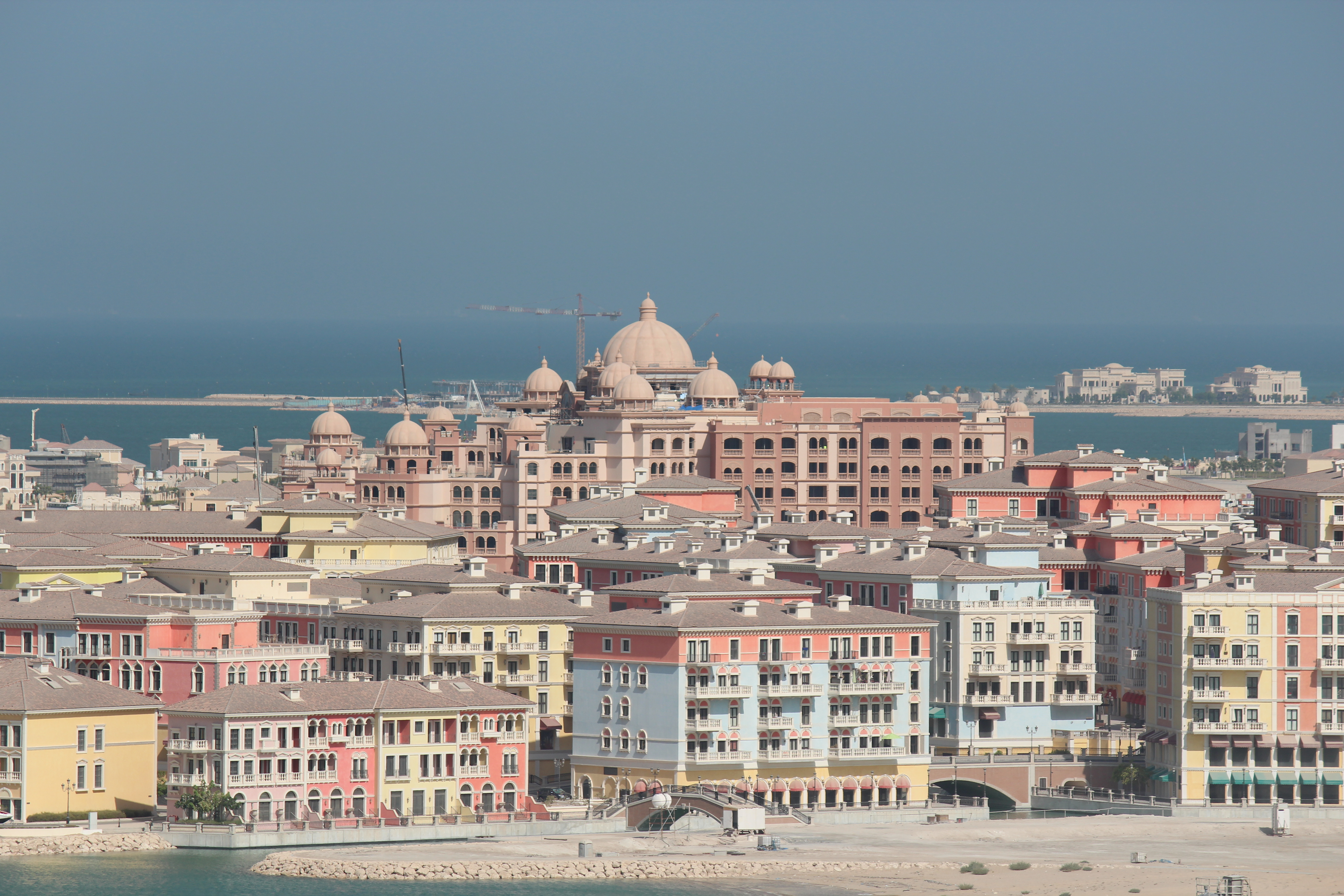
Far view of Qanat Quartier

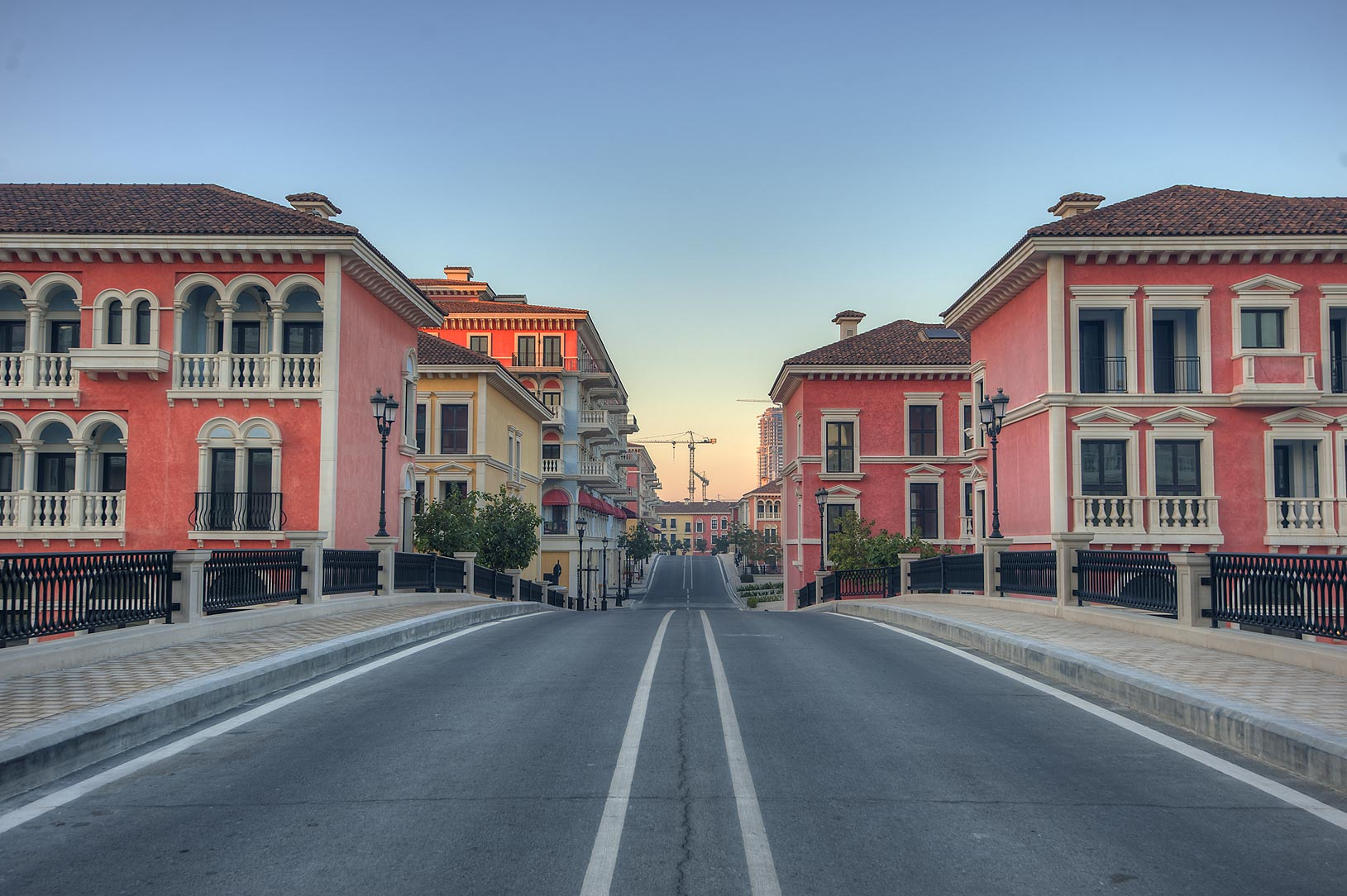
Bridge in Qanat Quartier

The Pearl Island's "Venice-like community" has an extensive canal system, pedestrian-friendly squares and plazas and beachfront townhouses. The first residents started to live in Qanat Quartier in 2012. When complete there will be:

- 977 residential apartments in 31 buildings
- 188 townhouses
- 15 bridges, including a replica of Venice's Rialto Bridge
- 200 retail units
- 320,000 square feet of retail space
- 1,135 parking spaces for cars
- 200 moorings in the marina
- Kempinski Resort and Spa

=== Abraj Quartier ===
This precinct is located by the entrance of The Pearl Qatar, and will have 7 towers including the tallest buildings planned for the development, at 40 storeys high.

== Commercial attractions ==
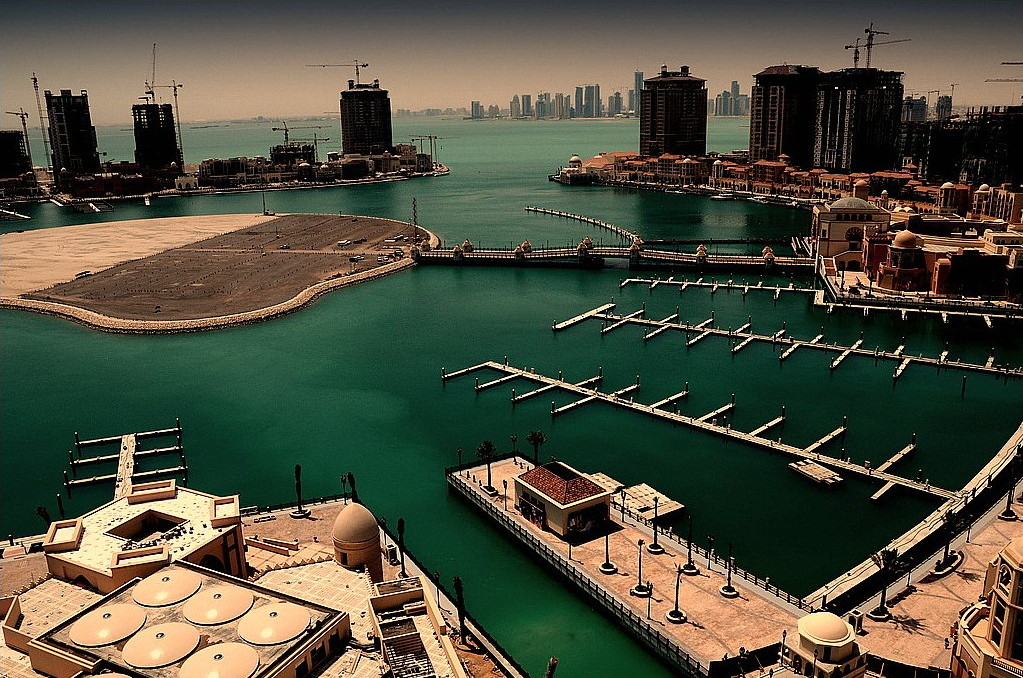
The Pearl Lagoon

The Central Authority Directorate (TCAD), which provides services like property registration and residency permits, opened on 3 December 2011. The island was also host the 2023 Qatar Classic Cars contest and exhibition and to several events during the 2022 World Cup.

The Pearl Island has several restaurants, as well as a coffee bar.

=== Hotels ===
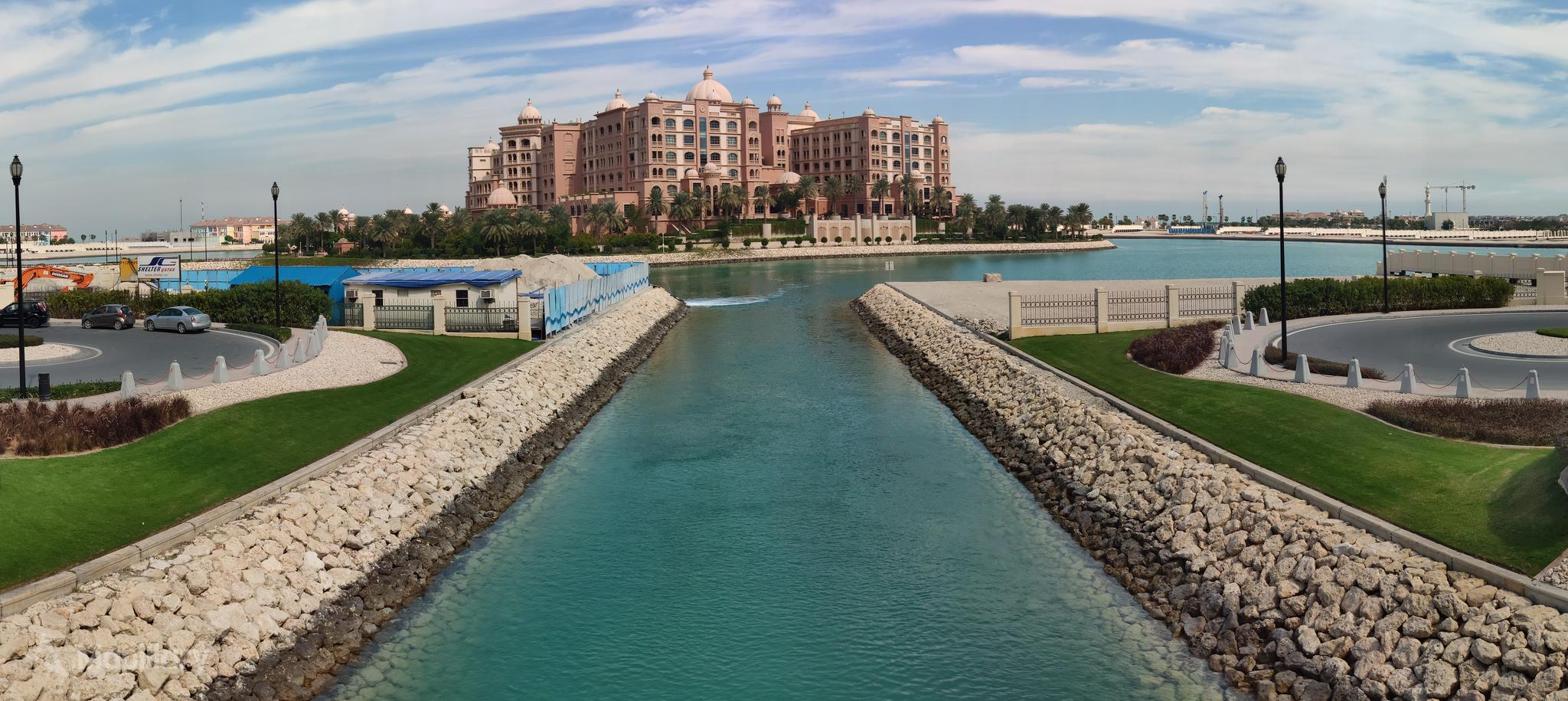
Marsa Malaz Kempinski as viewed from Pearl Boulevard

The Pearl Island currently has six hotels. Two of them, the 281-key Marsa Malaz Kempinski and the 193-key The St. Regis Marsa Arabia Island, The Pearl Qatar, are located on their own islets. The other four hotels are the 199-key Retaj Baywalk Residence, the 250-key Sedra Arjaan by Rotana, the 414-key Hilton Doha The Pearl, and the 161-key Four Seasons Resort and Residences at The Pearl-Qatar.

== Transport ==
Modes of transport varies from precinct to precinct. Golf carts are heavily used in Porto Arabia and Medina Centrale, while boat taxis are available in Porto Arabia and Qanat Quartier. Limousines are available in Porto Arabia, Medina Centrale, Qanat Quartier and Viva Bahriya. There are also bus stations, with routes that go to the Legtaifiya station. The M110 bus route goes from Porto Arabia and goes to parts of Viva Bahriya, then to the metro station.

== Gallery ==
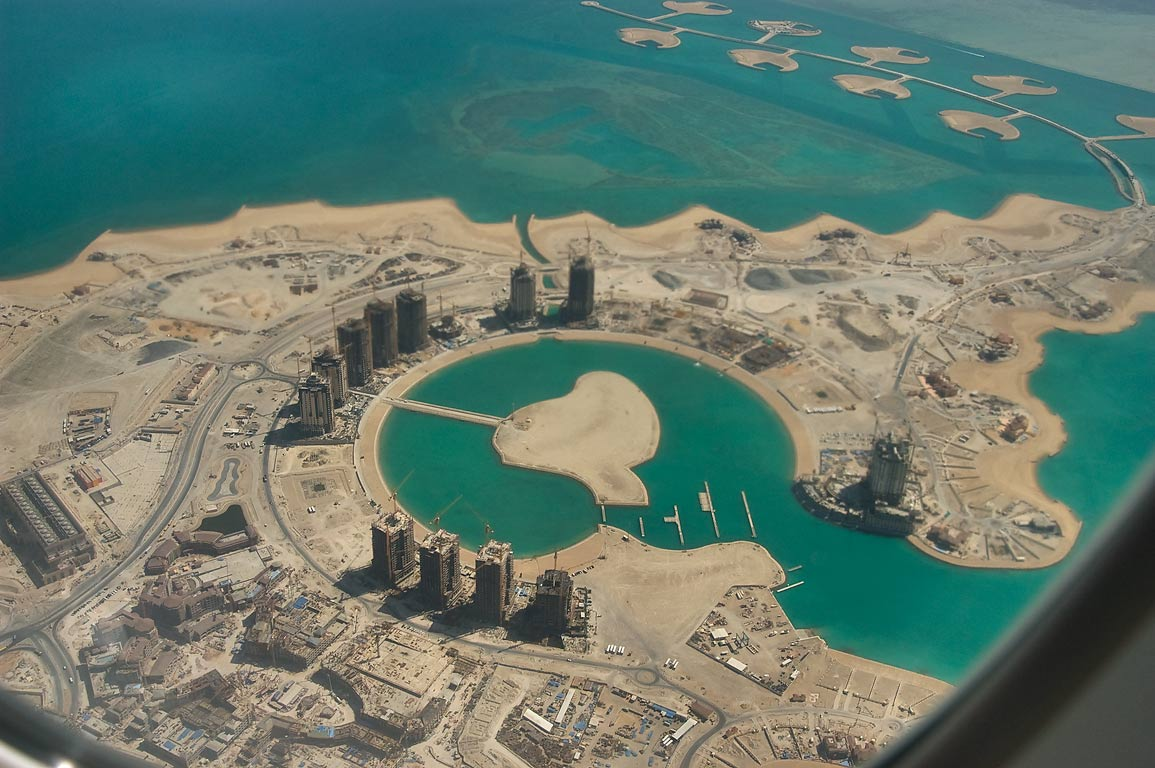
The Pearl Island, under construction

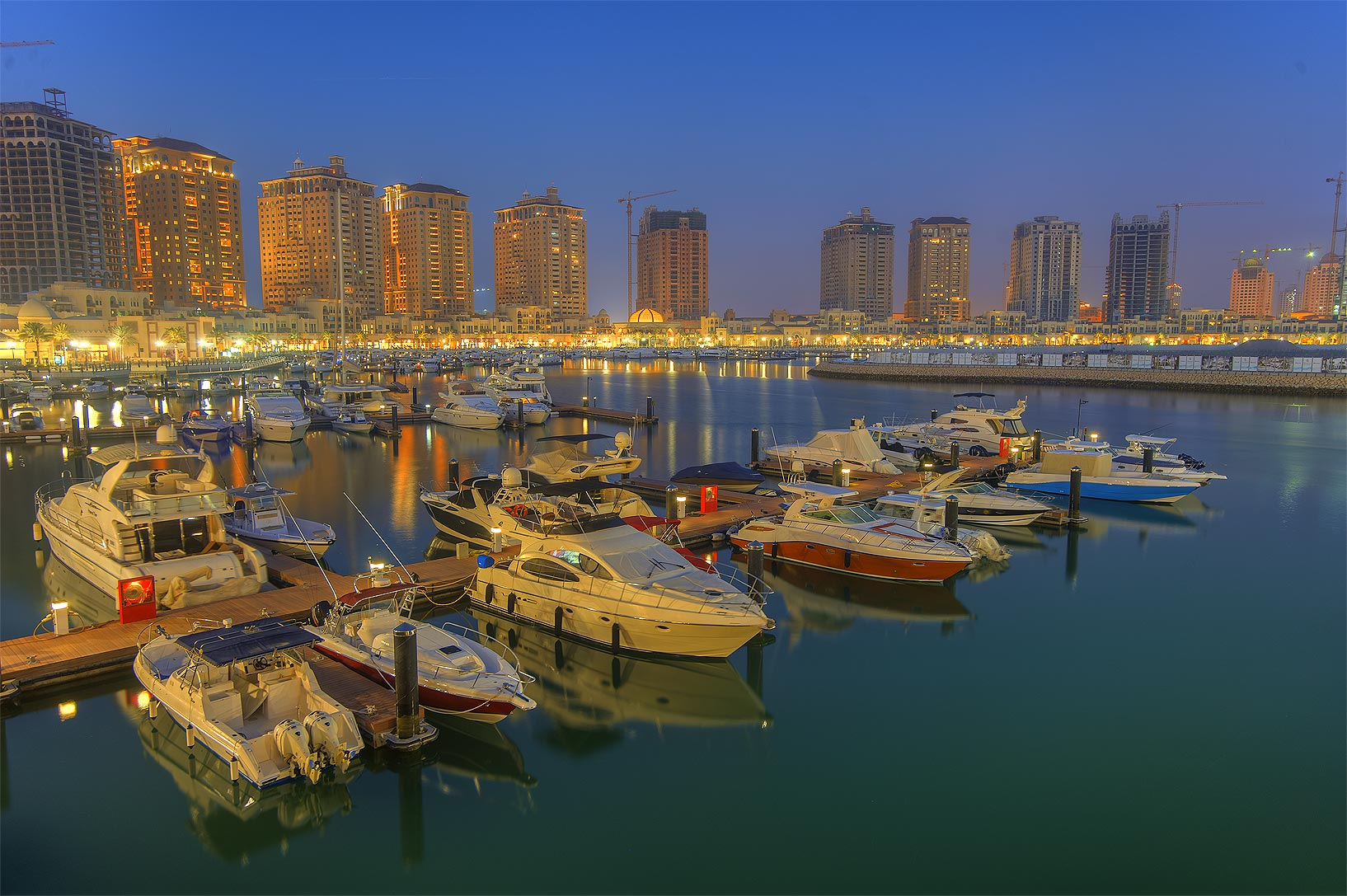
Porto Arabia

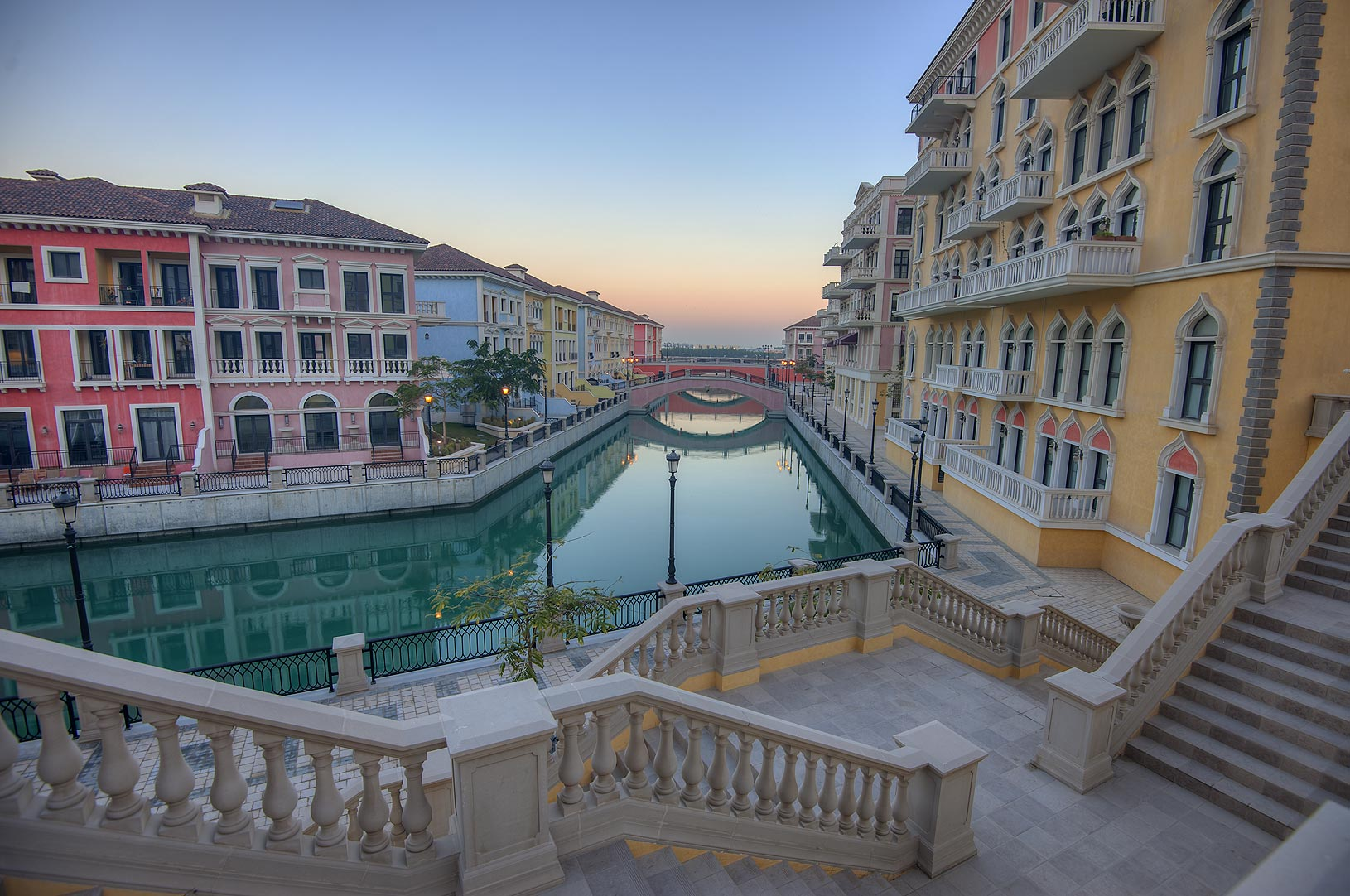
Murano area of Qanat Quartier

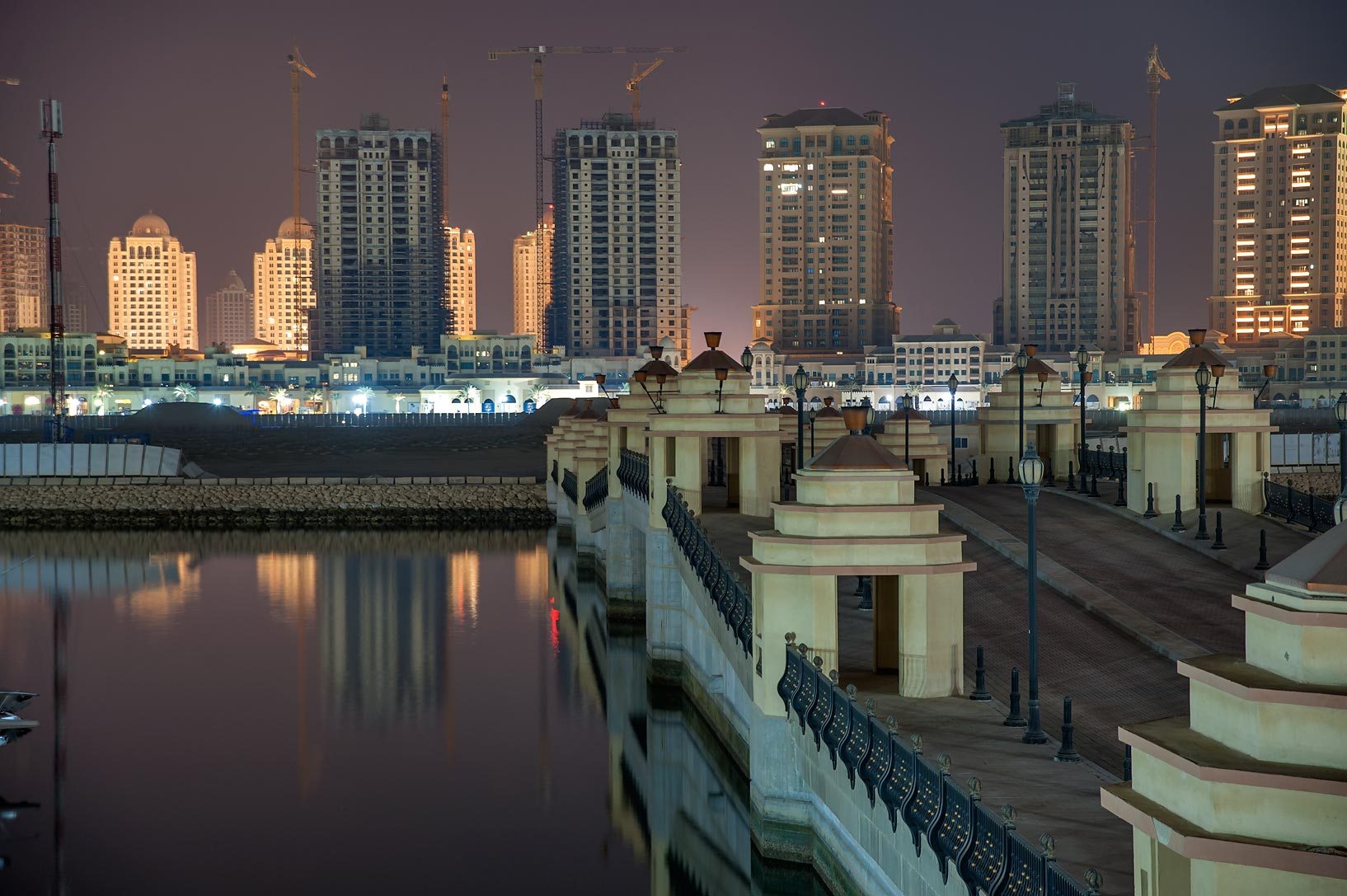
Bridge to Marsa Arabia in The Pearl

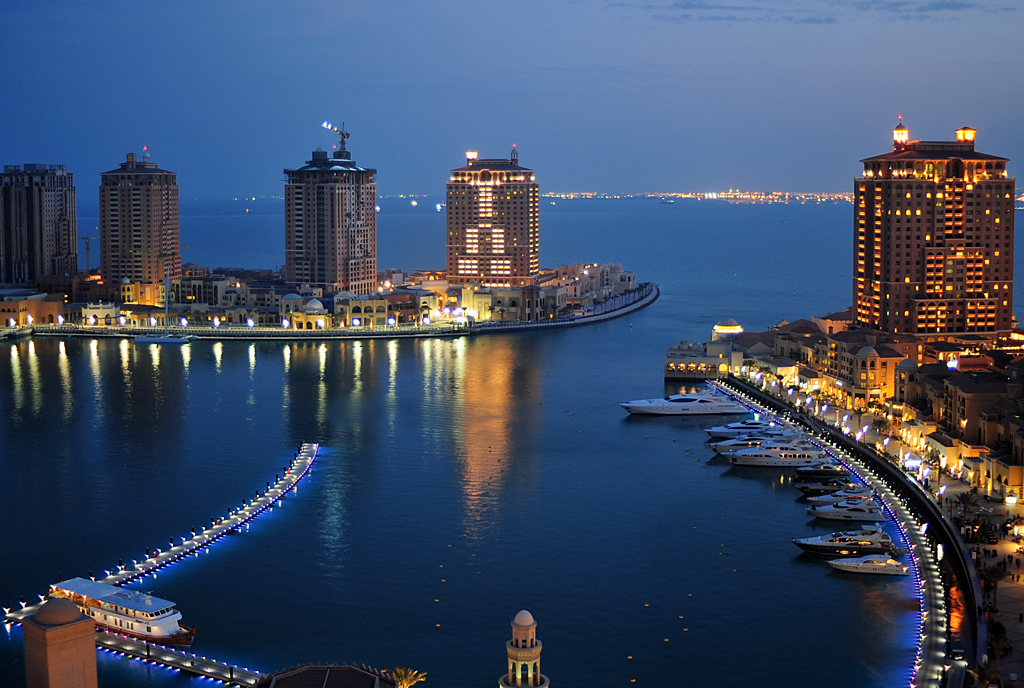
The Pearl Island at dusk

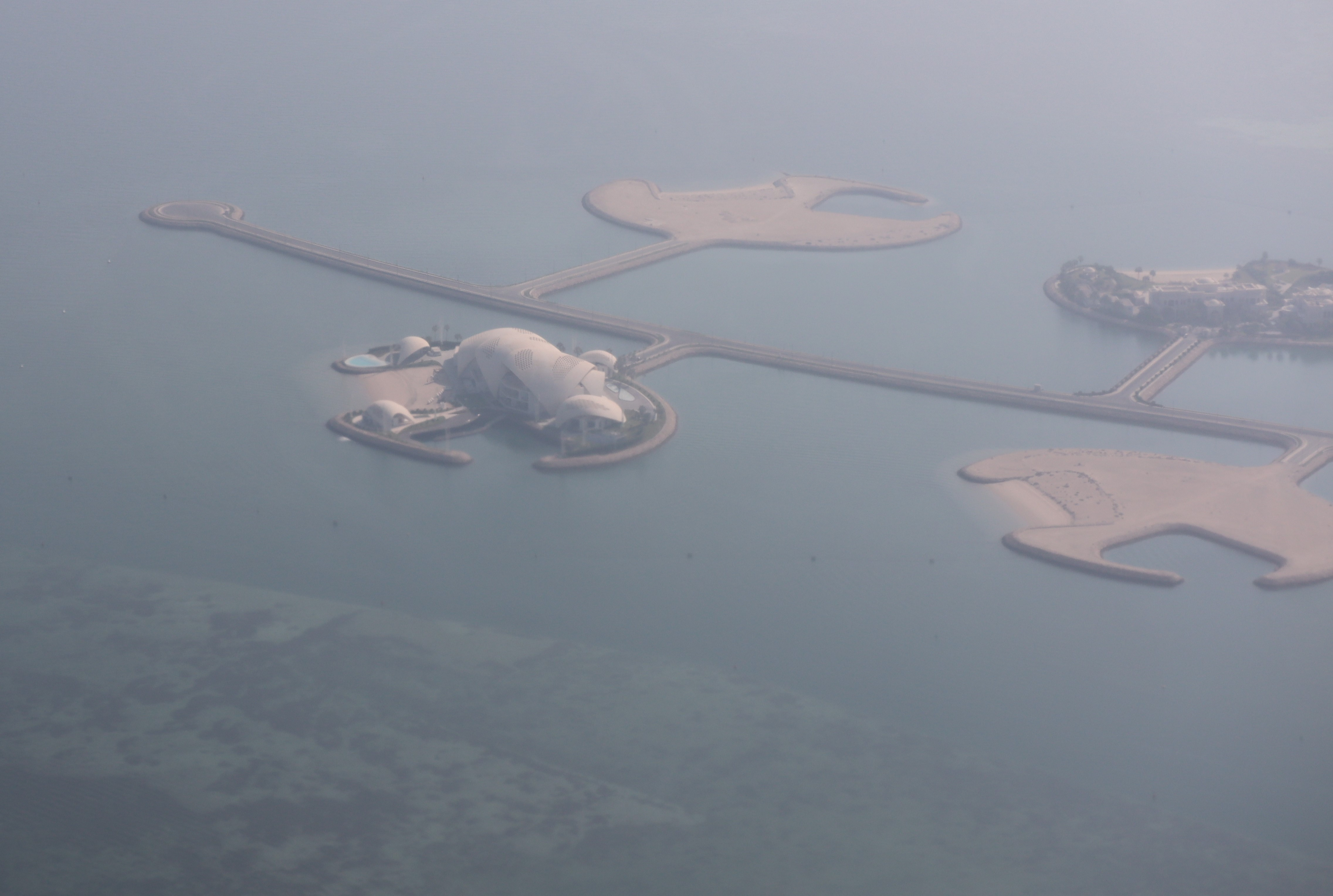
Part of The Pearl Island seen from the air in 2022

== See also ==
- Land reclamation
- Lusail
