= Ecole St. Pierre Hotel =

Hotel in Istanbul, Turkey

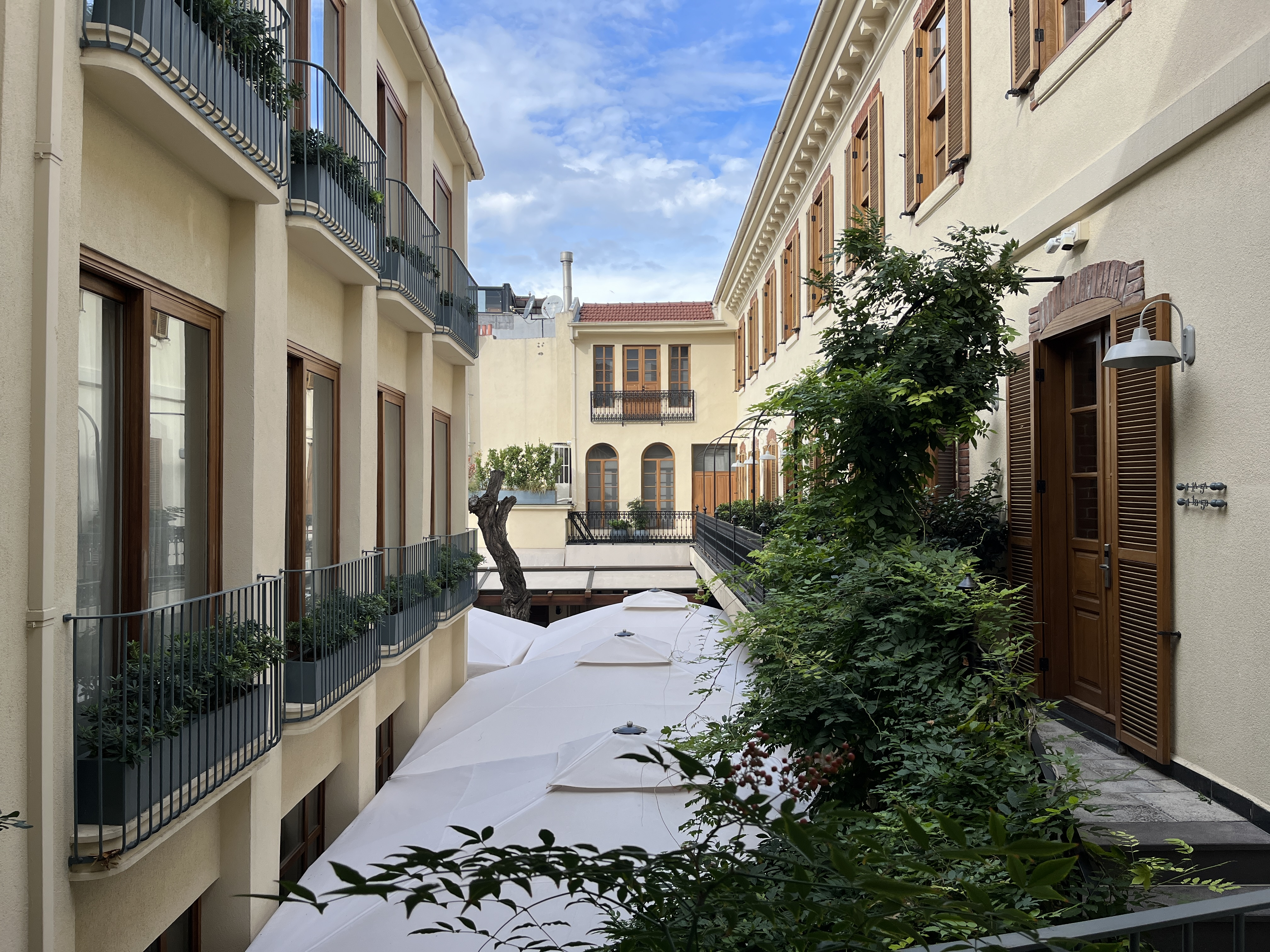
- Courtyard, 2023

General information
- Location: Istanbul, Turkey
- Opened: September 2021

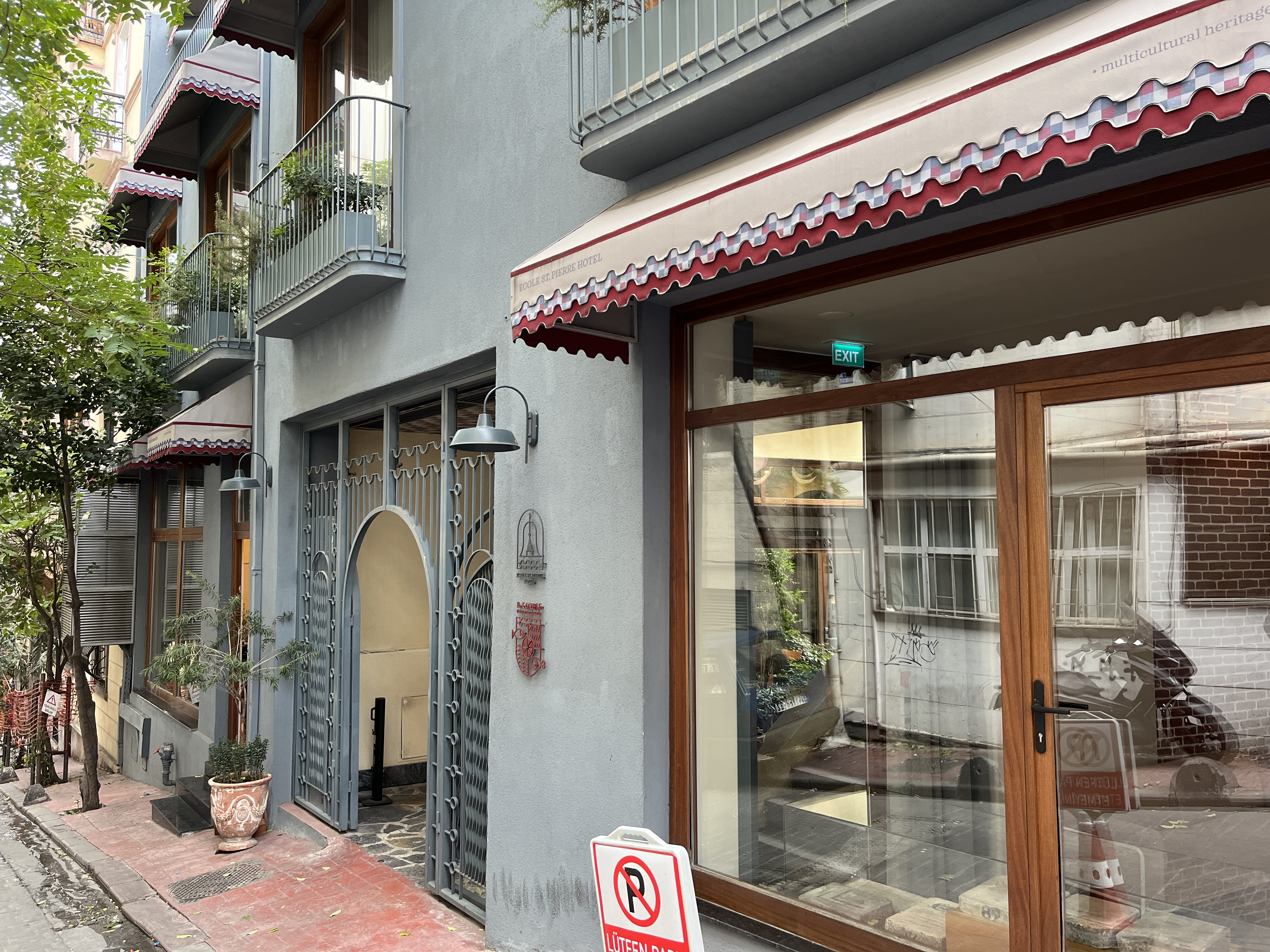
The hotel's exterior in 2023

Ecole St. Pierre Hotel is a hotel in Karaköy's Galata district, in Istanbul, Turkey. The 17-room boutique property near the Galata Tower opened in September 2021, in a former French Catholic school (the Collège des Frères St. Pierre Elementary School) designed by Italian architect Gaspare Fossati. Condé Nast Traveller included the hotel in a list of Istanbul's best in 2023.

== See also ==
- Hotels in Istanbul
