= Istanbul fireworks disaster =

2008 explosion of a fireworks factory in Istanbul

The Istanbul fireworks disaster occurred on 1 February 2008. An unlicensed fireworks factory exploded accidentally, leaving by some reports at least 22 people dead and at least 100 injured; other sources reported the death toll at 17 and 40 injured. The building that housed the unlicensed factory was in Davutpaşa, Esenler an industrial neighborhood. It was a multistory workshop complex it shared with other manufacturers of paint, socks and textiles. Two separate explosions were reported some five minutes apart from each other, the first possibly happening in the top floor fireworks factory, and the second larger explosion, reportedly emanating from the basement boilers where the paint manufacturing was located.

After the incident the building was partially collapsed and this had caused many of the victims to be crushed to death when floors collapsed.

The factory had reportedly been shut down by authorities twice prior to this incident, but continued to operate illegally.
