= Retaj Hotels and Hospitality =

Qatari real estate and hospitality company

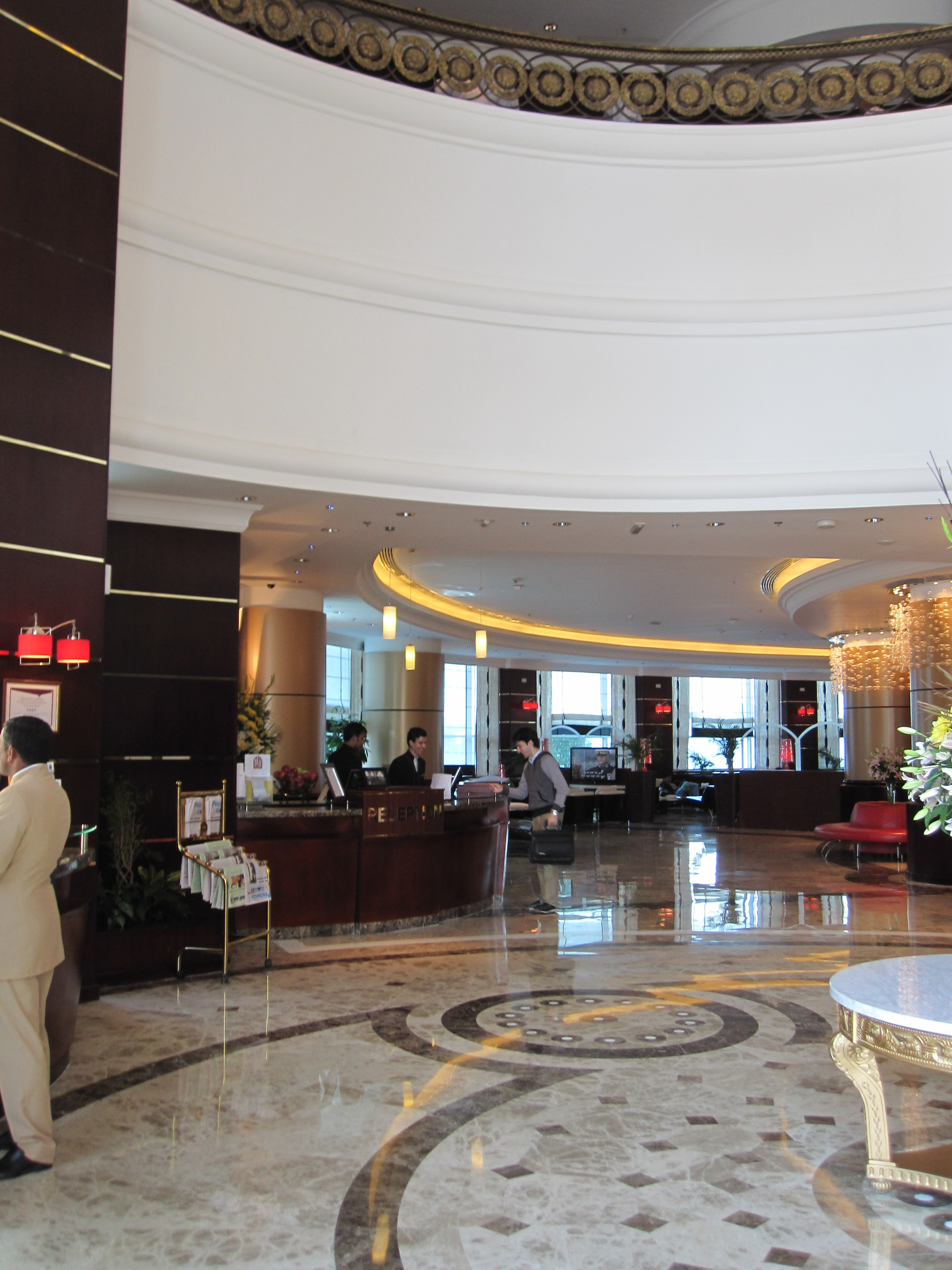
Lobby of one of the company's hotels

Retaj Hotels & Hospitality is a Qatari real estate and hospitality company with a total of 10 hotels operating in Qatar, Turkey, Comoros, and Saudi Arabia.

Retaj Hotels operates according to Islamic principles and has banned alcohol and smoking at its hotels. The company refers to its hotels as “Islamic hotels.”

== History ==
Retaj Hotels was established in Doha in 2004 and focuses on real estate development and project management, real estate services, and the hospitality business.

== Owners and leaders ==
Retaj Marketing & Project Management, a multipurpose company that overseas Retaj Hotels & Hospitality, is owned by five Qatari investors:

- Directorate of Endowments at the Ministry of Religious Entwinements, Islamic Affairs
- Sheikh Eid Bin Mohammad Al-Thani Charity Association
- Al-Jazeera Islamic Company (one of Qatar Islamic Bank companies)
- Al Umaraa Company for Trading and Properties
- Iqar company for properties investments and development (a contributory company between Qatar Islamic Bank and Endowment)

== Hotels ==
=== Qatar ===
Retaj Hotels & Hospitality owns 6 hotels in Qatar, all of which are located in Doha.

The Retaj Al Rayyan Doha Islamic hotel is situated in Doha's Al Dafna business district and contains 360 rooms in a 19-storey building. It is a 4-star hotel.

Retaj Royale Doha is a 5-star hotel located near Corniche Street which has 15 stories and 108 rooms. Retaj Royale Doha has 4 restaurants along with a spa and indoor pool.

Retaj Inn is situated in the commercial and business district at the center of downtown Doha. The hotel contains 80 rooms in a 12-storey building.

Retaj Inn Marina is situated in The Pearl Island and consists of 250 rooms as well as 2 outdoor pools and separate fitness rooms for men and women.

=== Turkey ===
Retaj Hotels & Hospitality owns 2 hotels in Turkey, one in Istanbul and one in Termal.

Retaj Royale Istanbul Hotel is located in the Istanbul Business District.

Retaj Thermal Hotel & Spa is located in Termal, Turkey, near the larger city of Yalova. The hotel consists of 88 rooms along with a spa, restaurant, garden, and café. The hotel was built with a “TRY 35 million investment in partnership with Turkish Hisar Karadag Group.”

In 2015, Balkans.com reported that Retaj Hotels & Hospitality plans to invest $700 million in Turkey over the next 2 years with plans to open new hotels in Istanbul, Bursa, Trabzon, and Ankara.

=== Comoros Island ===
The Retaj Moroni Sports and Leisure Resort is located in the Comoros. The hotel consists of 55 rooms.

=== Saudi Arabia ===
Retaj Al Rayyan Mecca is a 4-star hotel located in Mecca, Saudi Arabia. The hotel has 22 storeys and 670 rooms and suites as well as a restaurant, fitness center, and meeting rooms. A report published by Trade Arabia stated that the Al Rayyan Mecca hotel constitutes the Retaj Group's first step towards its “expansion plan in the GCC, particularly in Saudi Arabia.”

== Expansion ==
Retaj Hotels & Hospitality has various brands in its portfolio: Retaj Royale, a 5-star brand; Retaj Al Rayyan, a 4-star brand; and resort concept called Retaj Leisure and Resort. Recently, they have started their plans to expand with their budget hotel concept under the name of Retaj Inn. Retaj partnered with Taj Hana to expand their property in the Asian region. According to Dr. Mohammed bin Johar al-Mohammad, the vice-chairman of the Retaj Group, the company plans to have 25 hotels by 2024.

=== United States and Europe ===
According to the Gulf Times, Retaj is seeking to expand into the European and United States hospitality markets. Private sector resources are expected to invest $5 billion into European expansion. In March 2013, Retaj Group vice-chairman Mohammed bin Johar al-Mohammad told Gulf Times reporters, “We are eyeing the market in mainland Europe as well…we know there are openings for us. We are already in negotiations for taking a start in London.” In the United States, Retaj is focused on acquiring existing hotel outlets.
