= List of Byzantine monuments in Istanbul =

List of Byzantine monuments in Istanbul (historic Constantinople). This list is not complete.

(By alphabetical order)

A

- Atik Mustafa Pasha Mosque

B

- Basilica Cistern
- Boukoleon Palace

C

- Chora Church
- Church of St. Mary of Blachernae (Istanbul)
- Church of St. Mary of the Mongols
- Church of St. Polyeuctus
- Cistern of Philoxenos

D E

- Eski Imaret Mosque

F

- Fenari Isa Mosque

G

- Gül Mosque

H

- Hagia Irene
- Hagia Sophia
- Hippodrome of Constantinople
- Hirami Ahmet Pasha Mosque

K

- Kalenderhane Mosque
- Kefeli Mosque
- Koca Mustafa Pasha Mosque

L

- Little Hagia Sophia

M N P

- Pammakaristos Church
- Palace of Blachernae
- Palace of the Porphyrogenitus

S T

- Theodosius Cistern

V

- Vefa Kilise Mosque

Y

- Yoros Castle

Z

- Zeyrek Mosque

Ş

- Şeyh Süleyman Mosque
