= Sanki Yedim Mosque =

Mosque in Istanbul, Turkey

- Sanki Yedim Camii

Religion
- Affiliation: Islam
- Branch/tradition: Sunni

Location
- Municipality: Istanbul
- Country: Turkey
- Interactive map of Sanki Yedim Mosque
- Coordinates: 41°01′08″N 28°57′12″E

Architecture
- Type: mosque
- Established: 18th century

The Sanki Yedim Mosque (the Mehmed Şakir Efendi Mescit or Keçeci Hayreddin Mescit) is a mosque in the Zeyrek neighborhood, Fatih, Istanbul, Turkey.

== History ==
The mosque was built, probably in the 18th century, by someone by the name of Keçeci Hayreddin or by the name of Sankiyedim.

At some point the mosque was rebuilt by Adanalı Mehmet Şakir Ağa, and at some point the building burned, but was rebuilt by İmamzâde Hasan Efendi, reopening in 1868. It was again burned in the Çırçır fire of 1908, and was again rebuilt in 1959-1961 by the Türkiye Anıtlar Derneği.

== Origin of name ==
A popular story tells that the person who later founded the mosque, whenever he wanted to eat something special, instead of buying it, he would set the money aside and say, "It is as if I ate" (Turkish: Sanki yedim). Eventually he had put aside enough money to build a mosque.

== Description ==
The current mosque is architecturally undistinguished, squeezed between apartment buildings and made of reinforced concrete.
