= Zeyrek Mosque =

Mosque in Fatih, Istanbul, Turkey

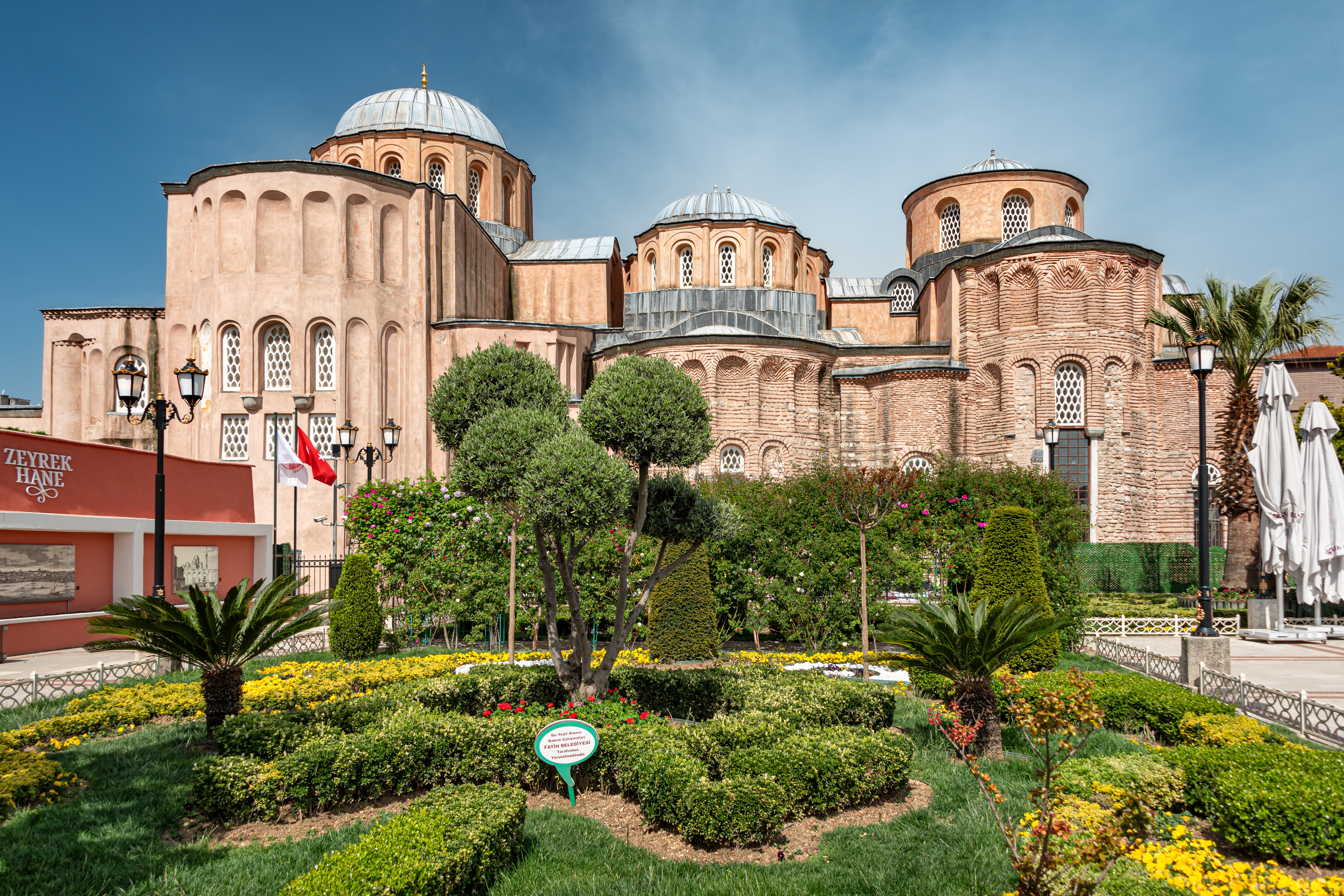
- The mosque viewed from north east. From left to right, one can see the apses of the Church of Christ Pantocrator, the Imperial Chapel and the Church of the Theotokos Eleousa.

- Location in the Fatih district of Istanbul

Religion
- Affiliation: Sunni Islam
- Year consecrated: Shortly after 1453

Location
- Location: Istanbul, Turkey
- Coordinates: 41°1′11″N 28°57′26″E

Architecture
- Type: Church with cross-in-square plan
- Style: Middle Byzantine - Comnenian
- Groundbreaking: Between 1118 and 1124
- Completed: Before 1136
- Materials: Brick

UNESCO World Heritage Site
- Part of: Historic Areas of Istanbul
- Criteria: Cultural: i, ii, iii, iv
- Reference: 356
- Inscription: 1985 (9th Session)

Zeyrek Mosque (Turkish: Zeyrek Camii) or the Monastery of the Pantokrator (Greek: Μονή του Παντοκράτορος Χριστού; Turkish: Pantokrator Manastırı), is a large mosque on the Fazilet Street in the Zeyrek district of Fatih in Istanbul, overlooking the Golden Horn. It is made up of two former Byzantine churches and a chapel joined together and represents the best example of Middle Byzantine architecture in Constantinople. After Hagia Sophia, it is the largest Byzantine religious edifice still standing in Istanbul.

It is less than 1 km to the southeast of Eski Imaret Mosque, another Byzantine church that was turned into a mosque.

East of the complex is an Ottoman Konak which has been restored and opened as a restaurant and tea garden called Zeyrekhane.

== History ==
=== Byzantine period ===
Between 1118 and 1124 the Byzantine Empress Irene of Hungary built a monastery on this site dedicated to Christ Pantokrator (Christ the Omnipotent). The monastery consisted of a church (which became the katholikon, or main church, of the monastery) also dedicated to Christ Pantokrator, a library and a hospital.

After the death of his wife, shortly after 1134, Emperor John II Komnenos built another church to the north of the first one which was dedicated to the Theotokos Eleousa (Merciful Mother of God). This church was open to the population and served by a lay clergy. By 1136 at the latest a southern courtyard and an exonarthex were added to the complex, and the two shrines were connected with a chapel dedicated to Saint Michael, which became the imperial mausoleum (heroon) of the Komnenos and Palaiologos dynasties. Besides many other Byzantine dignitaries, the Emperor John II and his wife Eirene, and Empress Bertha of Sulzbach (also known as Eirene), the wife of Manuel I Komnenos, were buried here.

During the period of Latin domination after the Fourth Crusade in 1204, the complex fell into the hands of the Venetian clergy, and an icon of the Theotokos Hodegetria was housed here. The monastery was also used as an imperial palace by the last Latin Emperor, Baldwin.

After the Palaiologan restoration, the monastery was once again used by Orthodox monks. The most famous of them was Gennadius II Scholarius, who left the Pantokrator to become the first Patriarch of Constantinople after the Muslim conquest of the city in 1453.

=== Ottoman and Republican period ===
Shortly after the Fall of Constantinople the main church was converted into a mosque, while the monastery served for a while as a medrese. The Ottomans named it after Molla Zeyrek, a scholar who taught there. However, because of its importance to Byzantine history, Zeyrek was one of the few buildings of Constantinople whose old denomination was never forgotten and was written about by foreign visitors including the French traveller Pierre Gilles who described it in his book about Constantinople, written in the sixteenth century. After the completion of the medreses in the Fatih complex in 1471, Muslim students abandoned Zeyrek, and the rooms once occupied by the school vanished.

By the early 21st century the edifice had become very rundown and partly ruinous as a result of which it was added to the UNESCO watchlist of endangered monuments. Extensive and sometimes controversial restoration has now been completed and the mosque reopened for prayer.

== Architecture ==
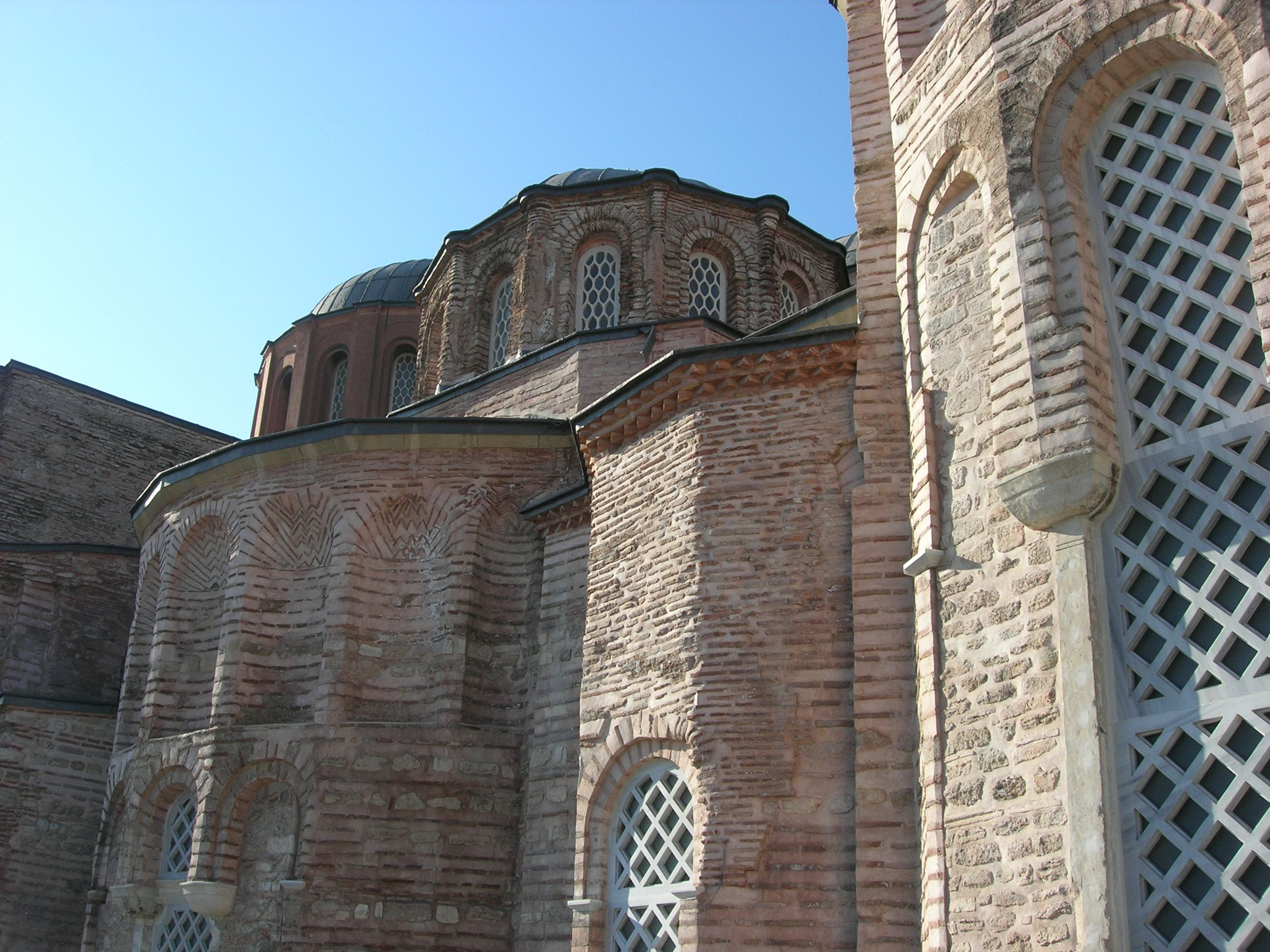
The apsis of the Imperial Chapel (in background), built with the recessed brick technique.

The masonry has been partly built using the recessed brick technique typical of the Byzantine architecture of the middle period. In this technique, alternate courses of bricks are mounted behind the line of the wall in a mortar bed. The thickness of the mortar layers is about three times greater than that of the brick layers.

The south and the north churches are both cross-shaped with central domes and polygonal apses with seven sides rather than the five that had been typical in the Byzantine architecture of the previous century. The apses also feature triple lancet windows flanked by niches.

The southern church is the largest. To the east, it has an esonarthex, which was eventually extended right up to the imperial chapel. The church is surmounted by two domes, one over the naos and the other over the matroneum (a separate upper gallery for women) of the narthex. Once very rich, the decoration of the church has disappeared almost completely, bar some marble fragments in the presbyterium. The historical opus sectile floor made from coloured marble worked in a cloisonné technique, with human and animal figures represented, is currently covered by a modern carpet. Fragments of coloured glass found here suggest that the windows were once filled with stained glass with figures of saints. Mosaics representing the apostles and the life of Christ were still visible - although defaced - in the 18th century.

The imperial chapel is covered by barrel vaults and surmounted by two domes.

The north church has only one dome, and is notable for the frieze carved with dog's tooth and triangle motifs running along the eaves.

Near the mosque is the Şeyh Süleyman Mescidi, a small Byzantine building that probably belonged to the Pantokrator Monastery. It may have housed a library, although that is not certain.

In its entirety, this monastic complex is the best example of Middle Byzantine architecture to survive in Istanbul

== Gallery ==
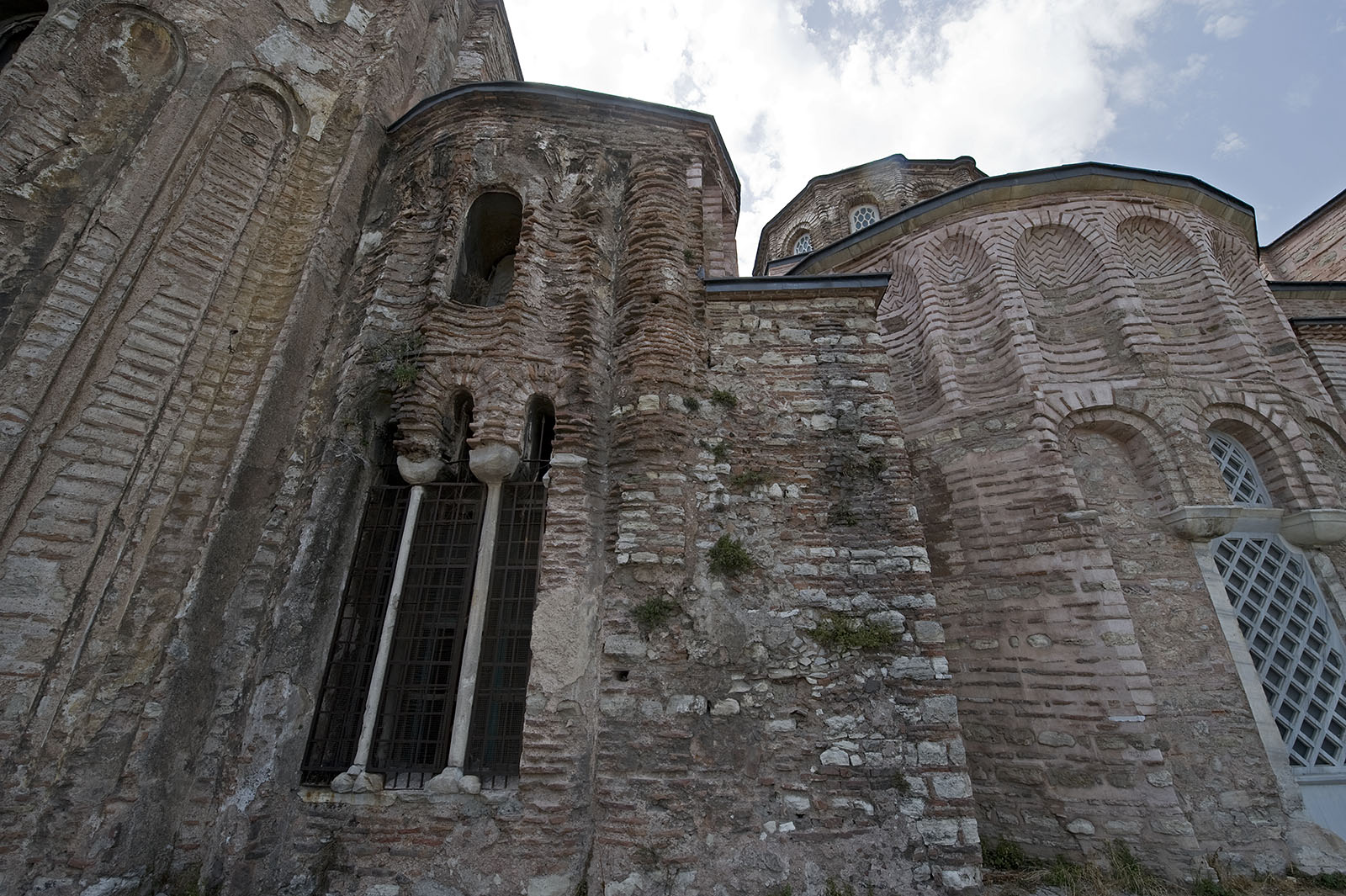
Zeyrek Mosque

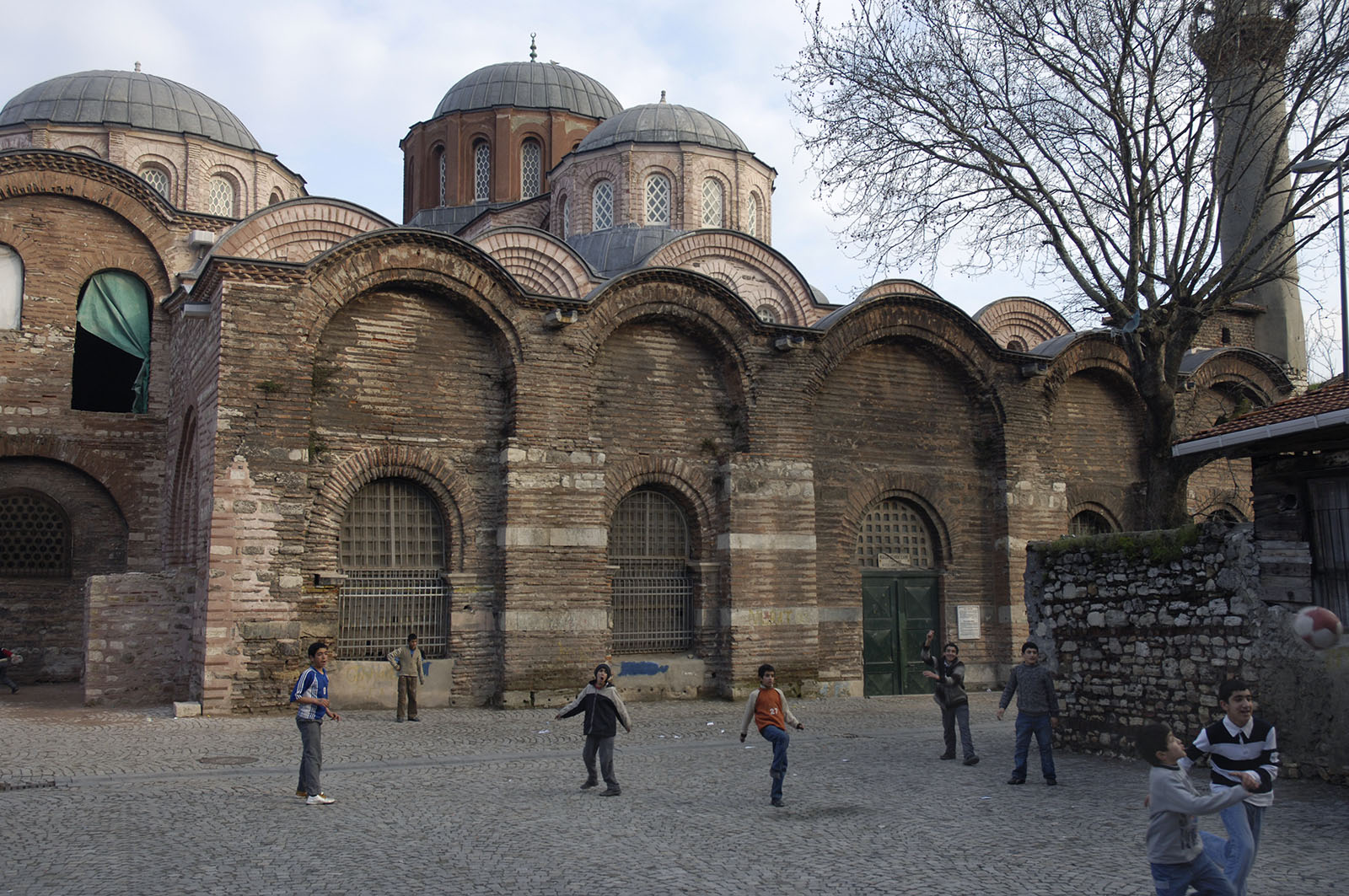
Zeyrek Mosque

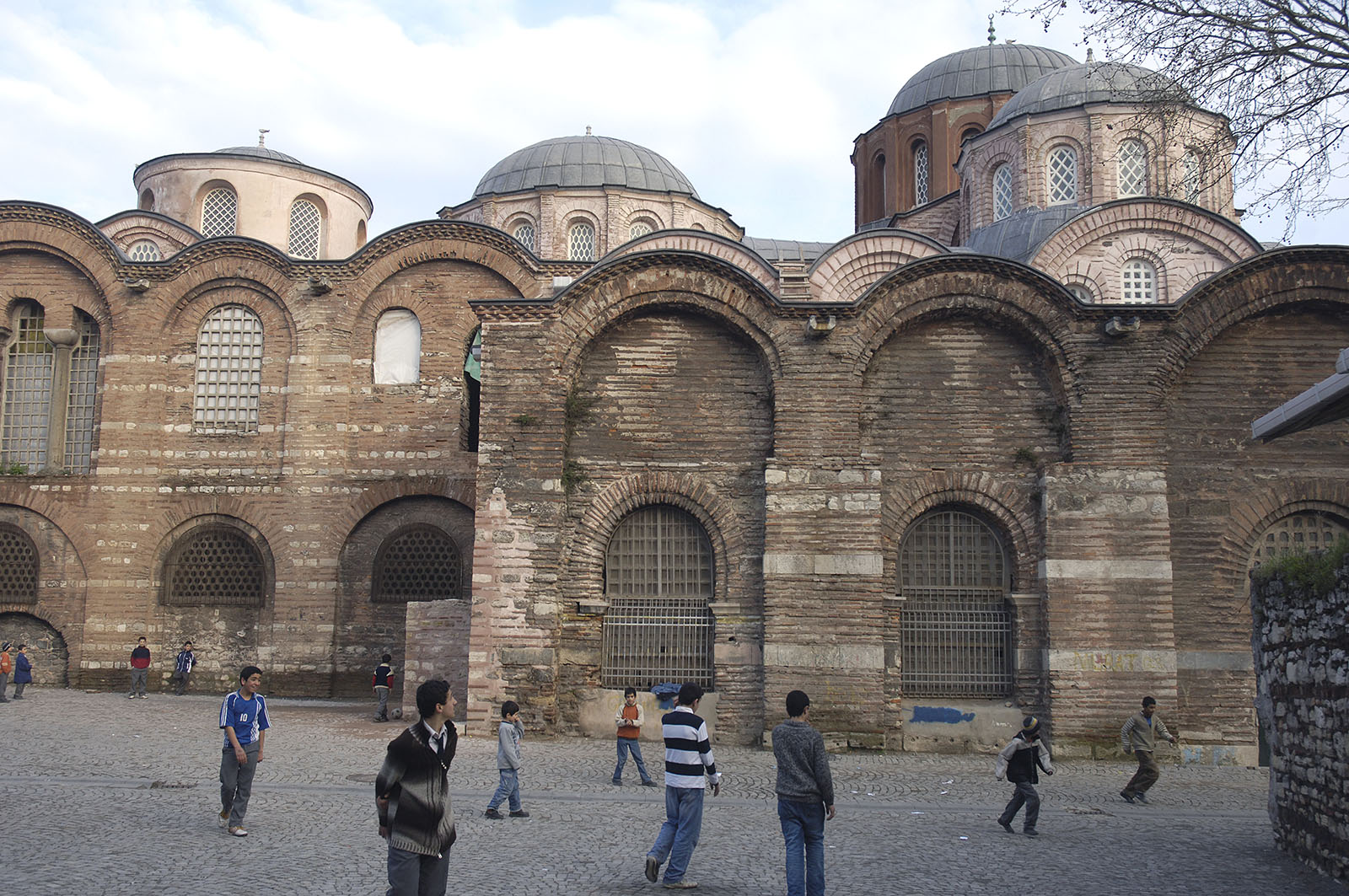
Zeyrek Mosque

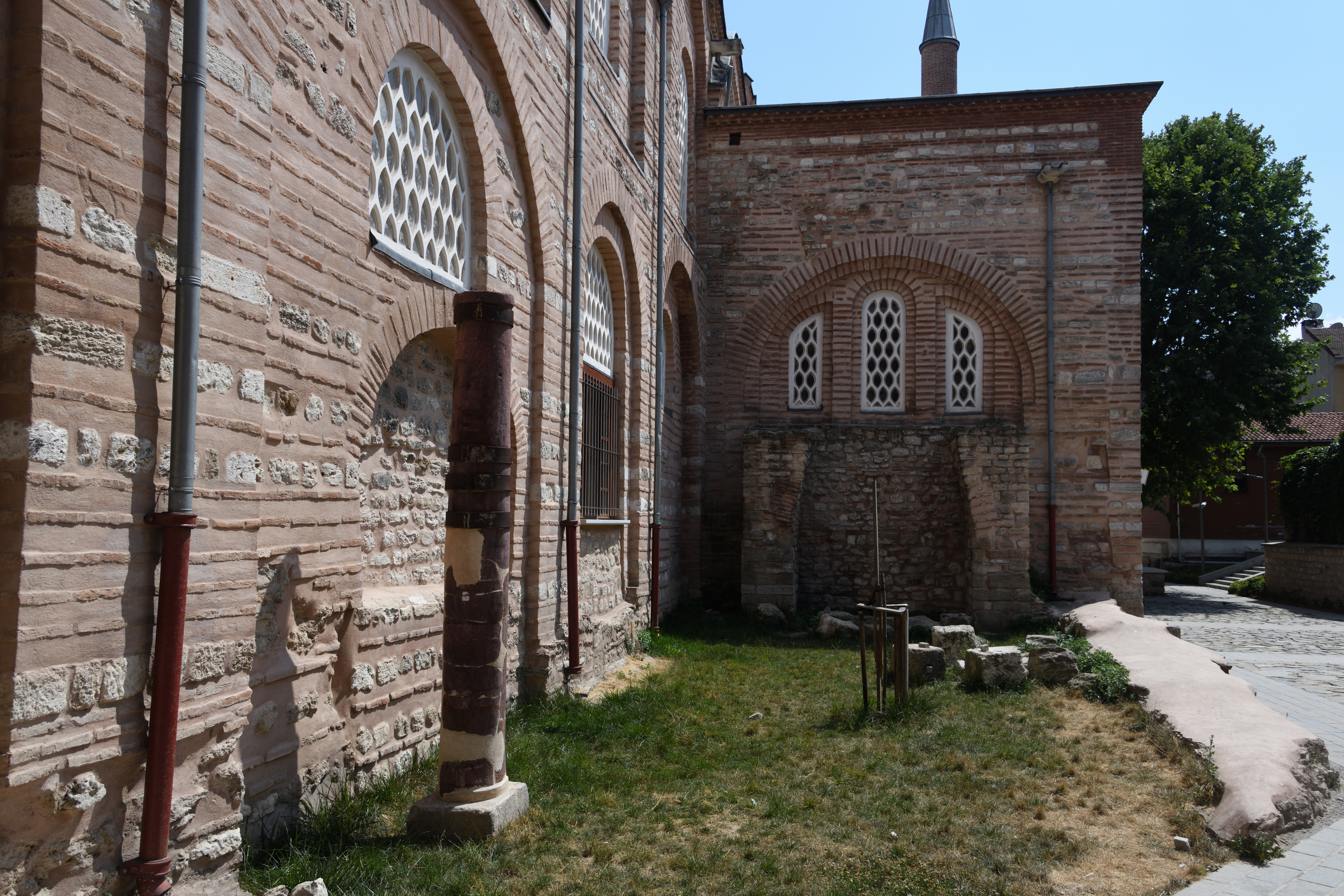
Molla Zeyrek Mosque: Part of front

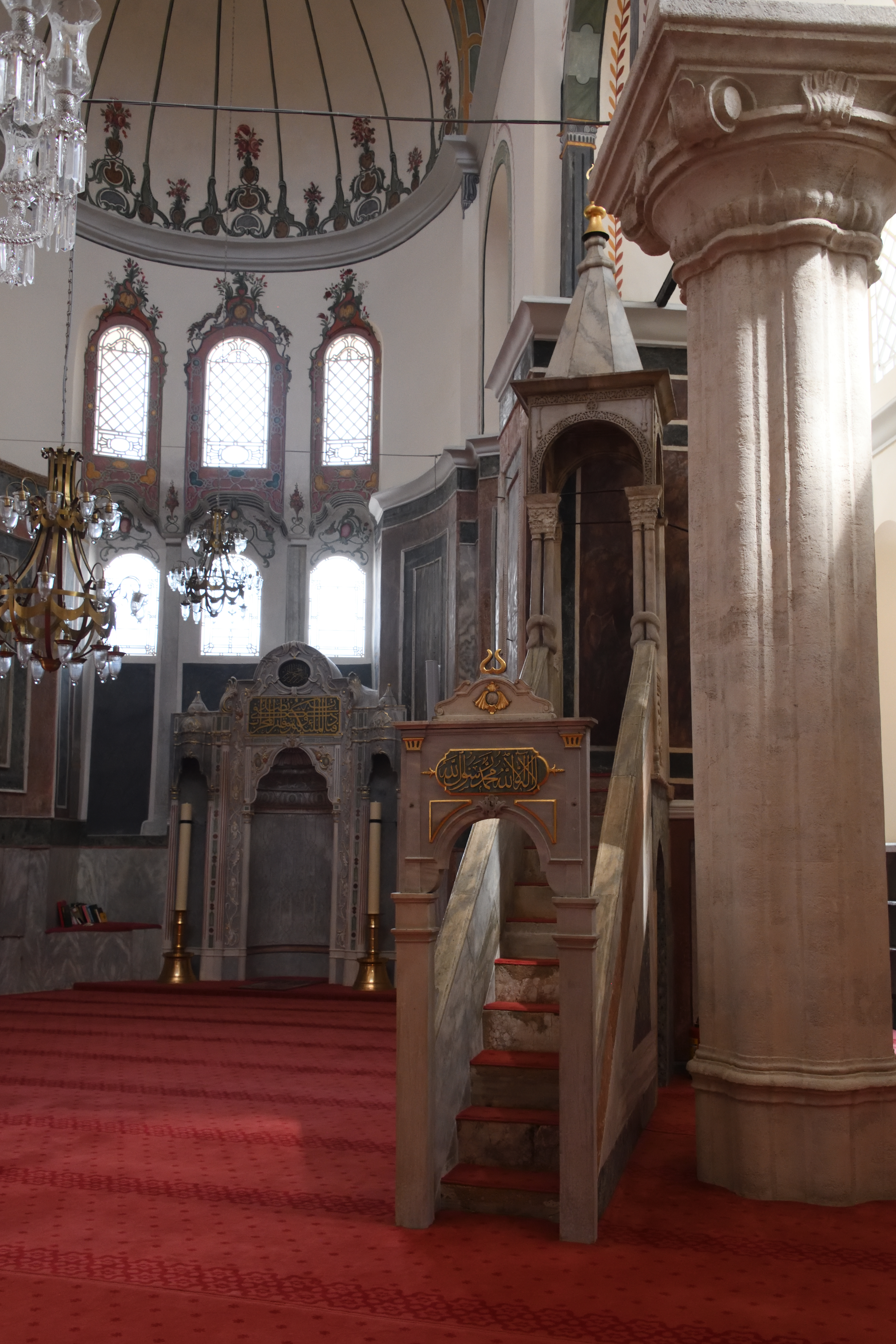
Molla Zeyrek Mosque: South church

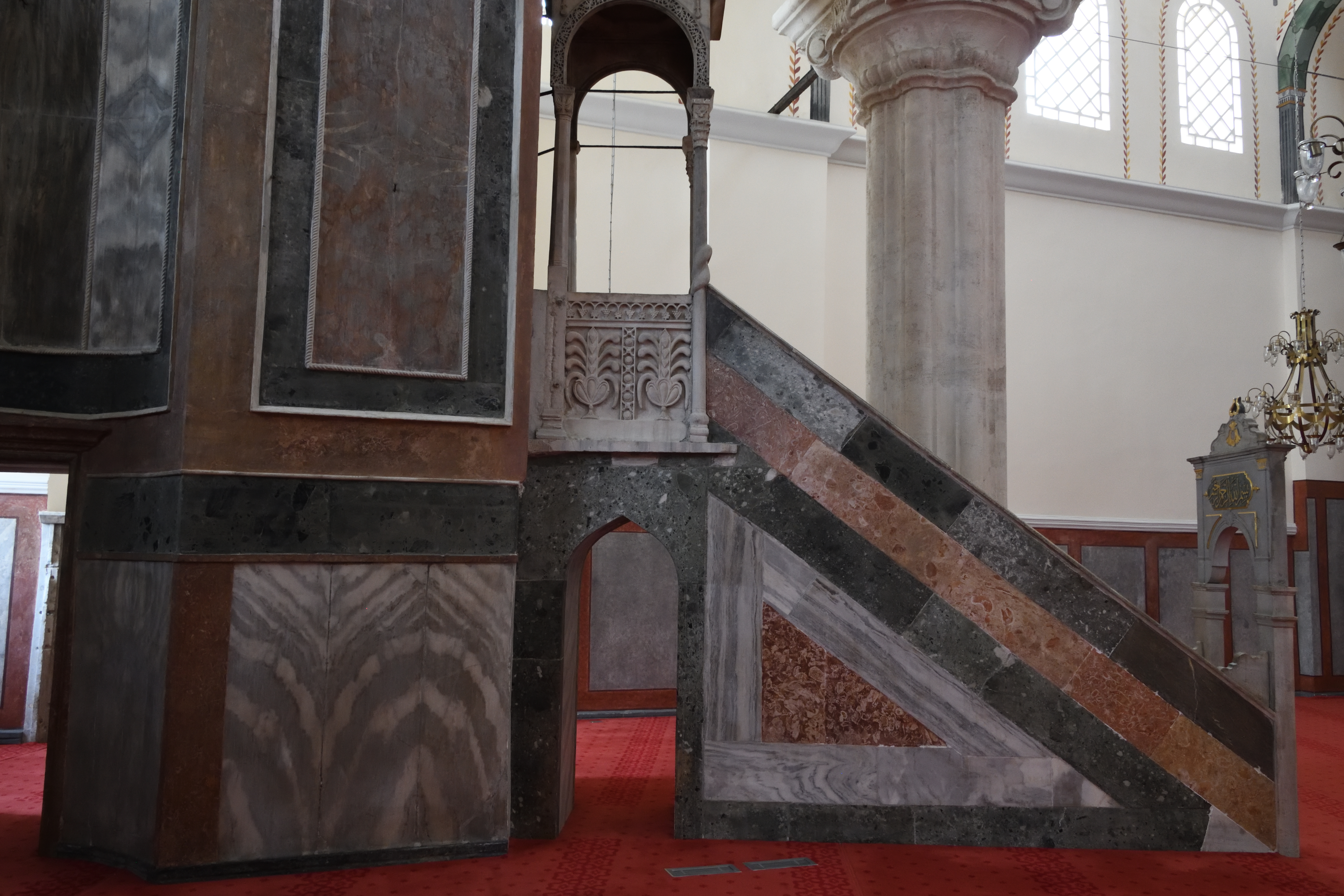
Molla Zeyrek Mosque: Mihrab

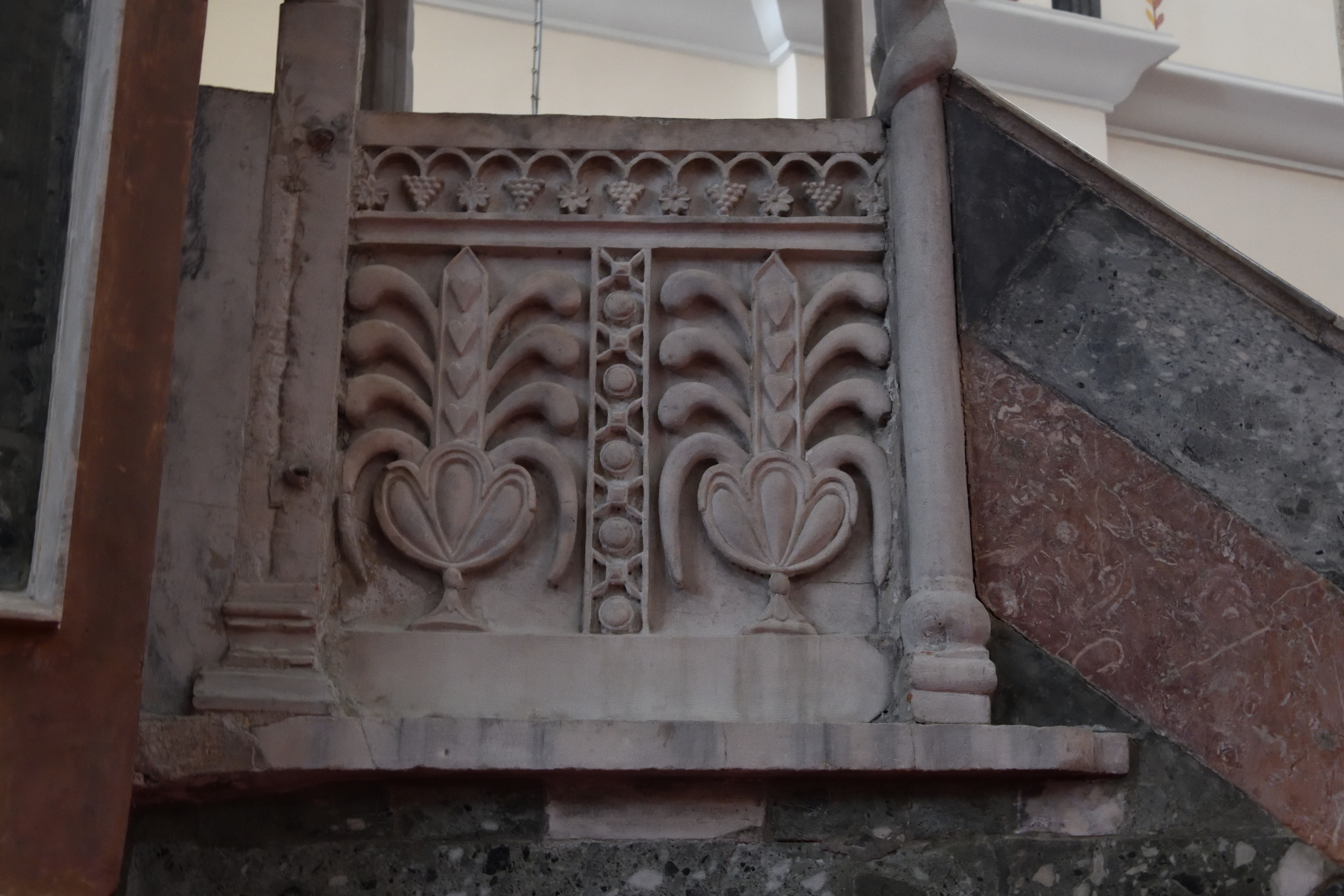
Molla Zeyrek Mosque: Mihrab

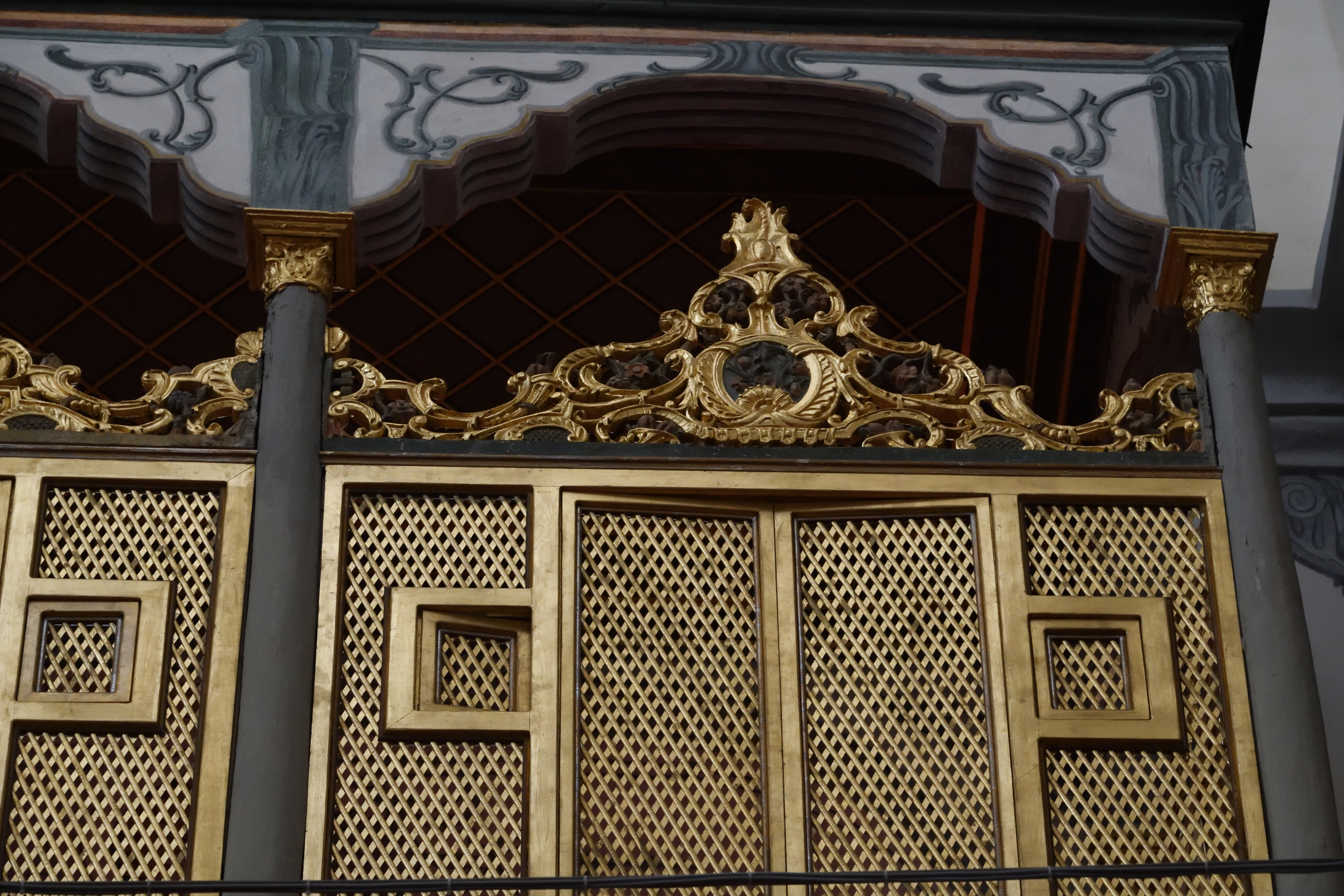
Molla Zeyrek Mosque: Hünkar mahfili used by sultan

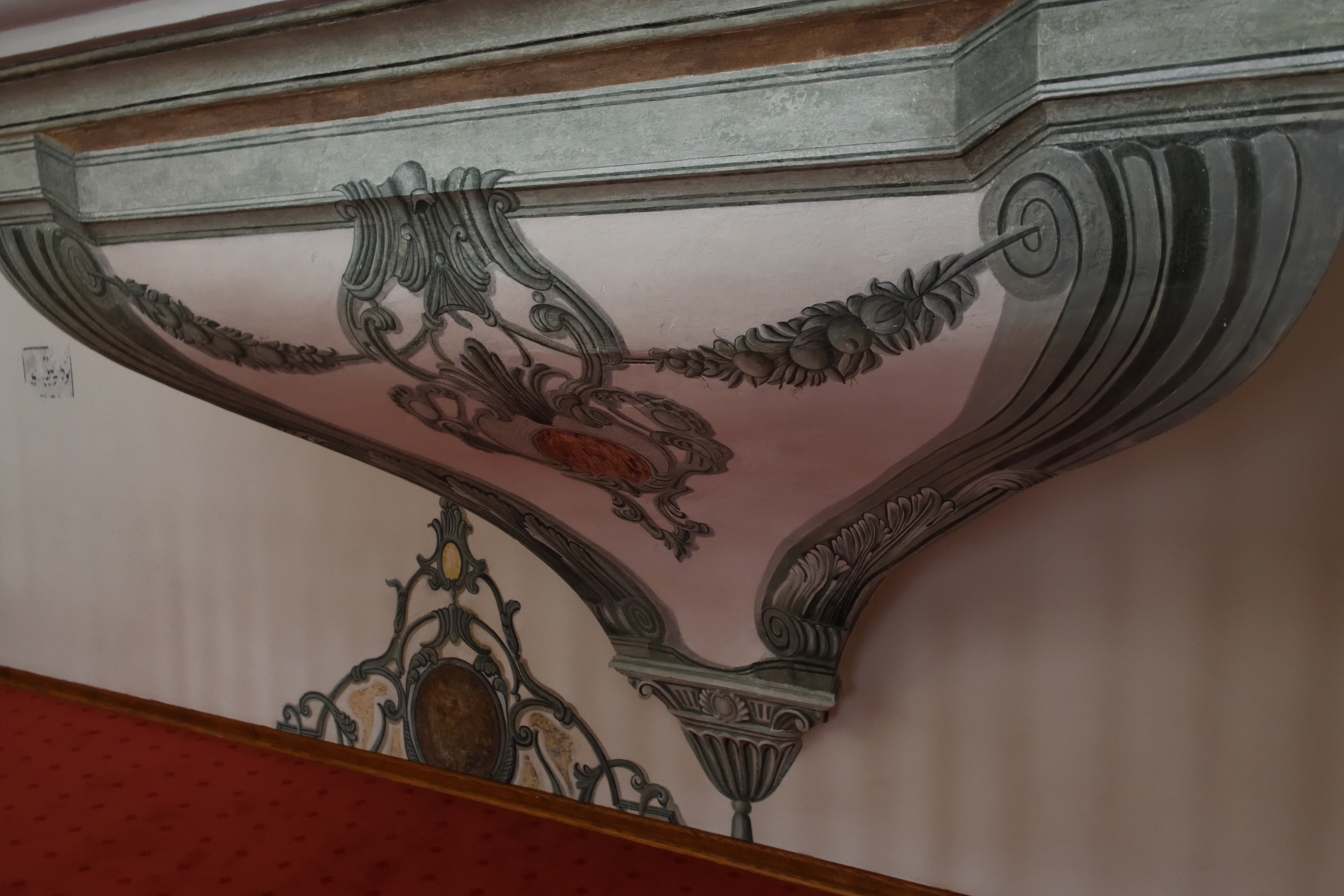
Molla Zeyrek Mosque: Hünkar mahfili underside

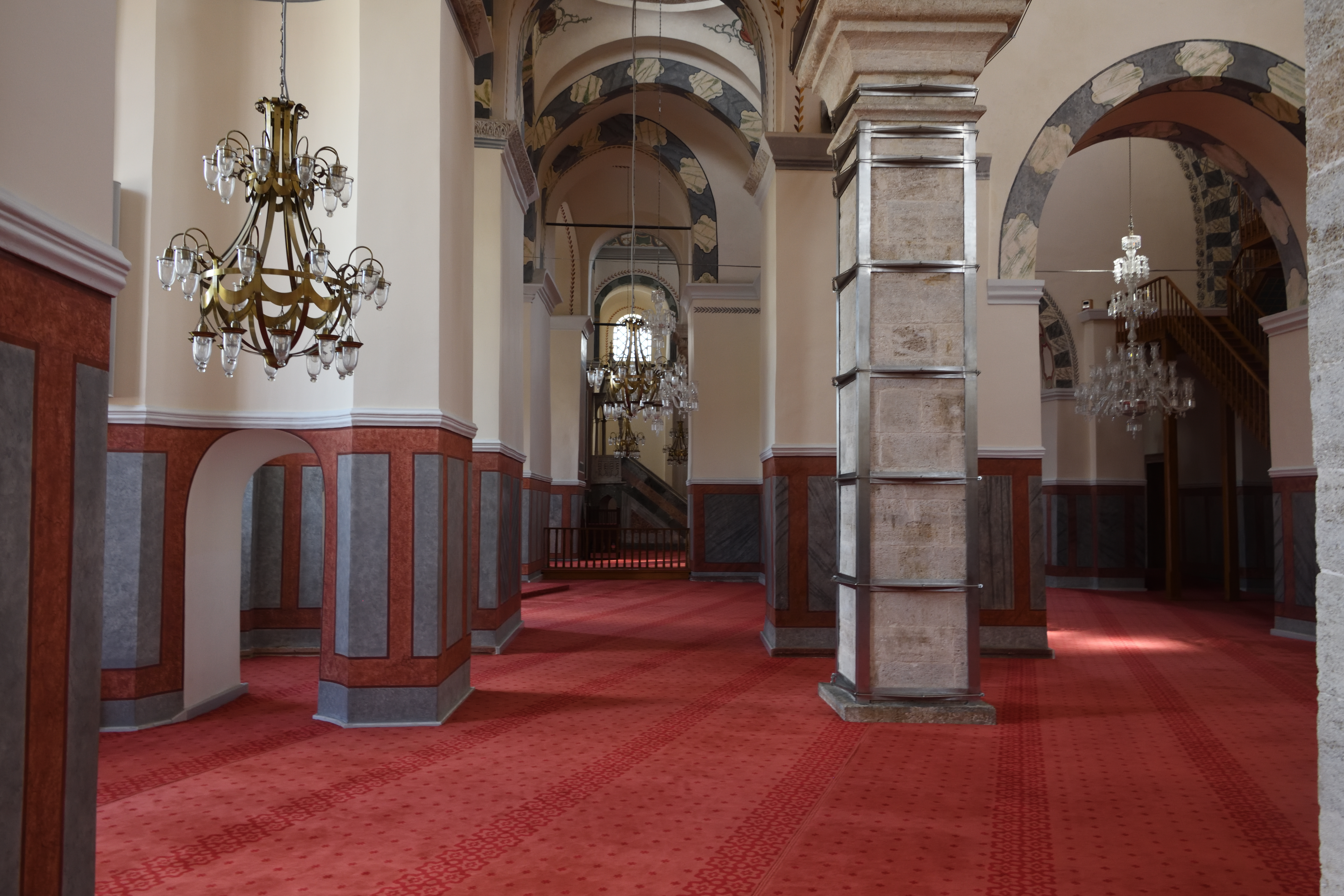
General view of Molla Zeyrek Mosque

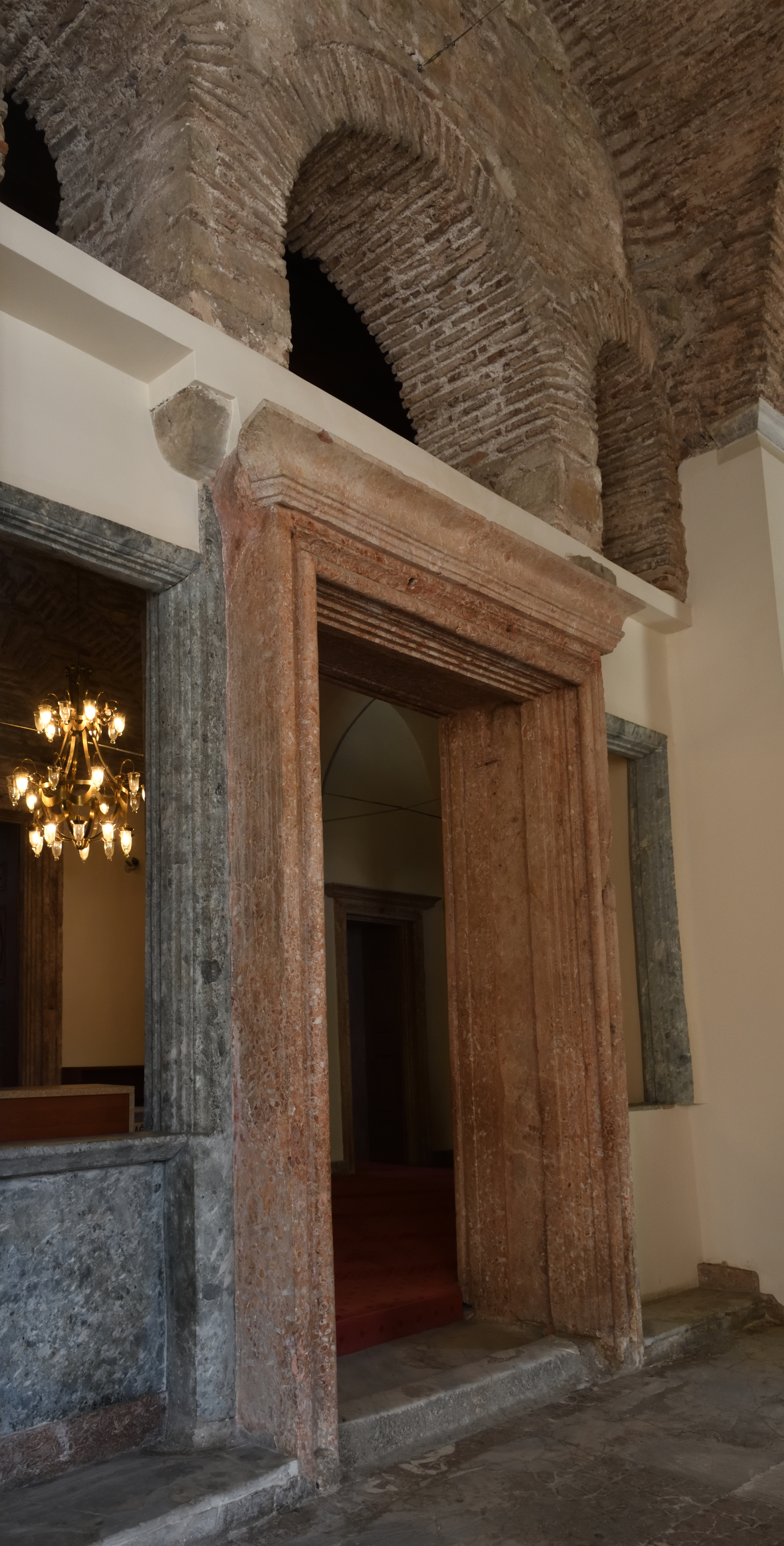
Byzantine doorframe of Molla Zeyrek Mosque

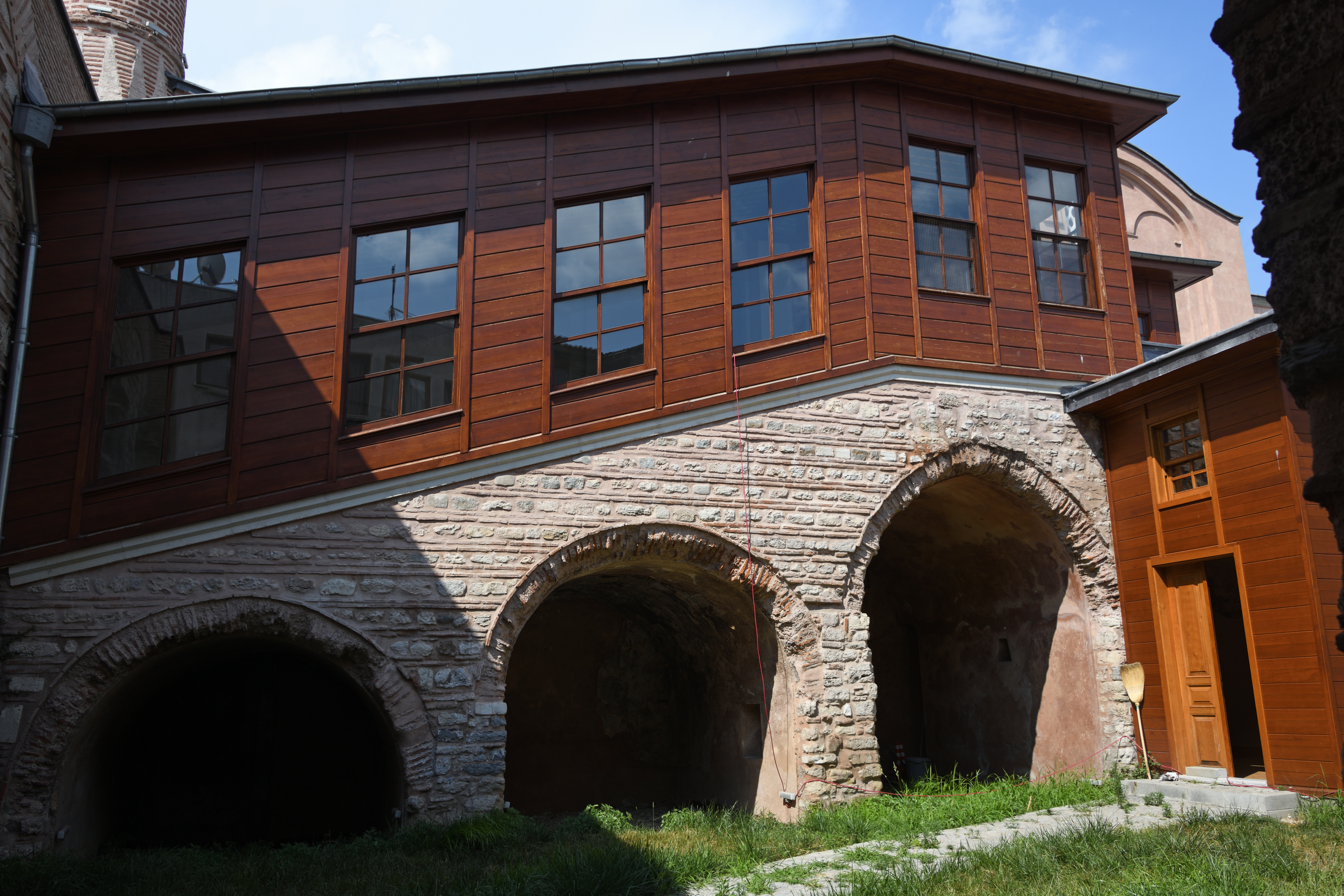
Molla Zeyrek Mosque: Exterior view

== See also ==
- Ancient Roman and Byzantine domes
