= Şeyh Süleyman Mosque =

Mosque in Istanbul, Turkey

Şeyh Süleyman Mosque Şeyh Süleyman Mescidi
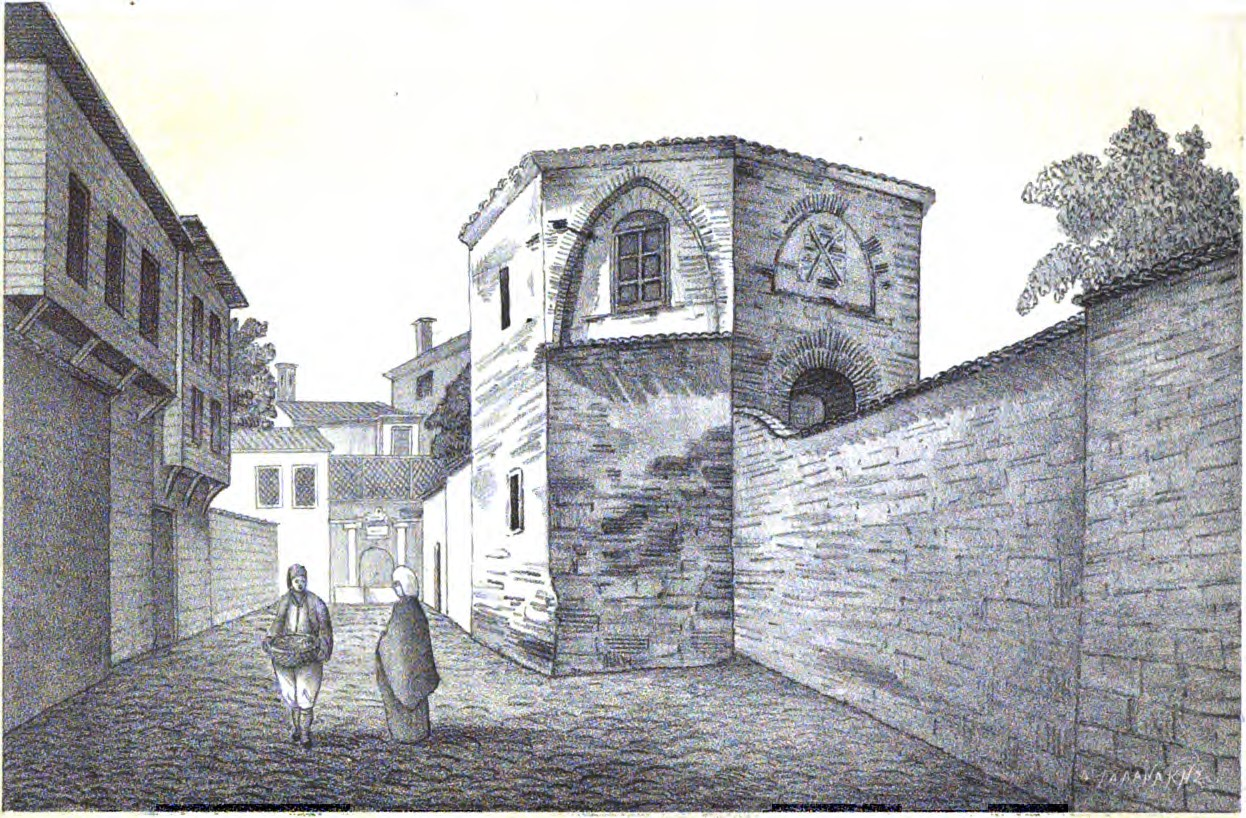
- The mosque viewed from south in a drawing of 1877, from A.G. Paspates' Byzantine topographical studies

- Location in the Fatih district of Istanbul

Religion
- Affiliation: Sunni Islam
- Year consecrated: Shortly after 1453

Location
- Location: Istanbul, Turkey
- Coordinates: 41°01′9.13″N 28°57′19.32″E

Architecture
- Type: Burial place or library
- Style: Byzantine
- Groundbreaking: 1118
- Completed: 1124
- Materials: brick, ashlar

Şeyh Süleyman Mosque (Turkish: Şeyh Süleyman Mescidi) is a mosque in Istanbul converted from a former Byzantine building which was part of the Eastern Orthodox Pantokrator Monastery. Its usage during the Byzantine era is unclear. The small building is a minor example of architecture of the Byzantine middle period in Constantinople.

== Location ==
The structure is located in Zeyrek Sokak, in the district of Fatih, in the neighborhood of Zeyrek, about 120 meters southwest of the former Pantokrator Church, now part of the Mosque of Zeyrek.

== History ==
Nothing is known about the history of this small octagonal building before 1453. Almost certainly it was part of the great Monastery of Christ Pantokrator, erected between 1118 and 1124 by Byzantine Empress Irene Komnene. According to some scholars it could have been a burial place, while others think that it was the library of the monastery.

Shortly after the Fall of Constantinople in 1453, under Mehmed II, the building was converted into a mosque by Şeyh Süleyman Halîfe (?–1491). In any case, the instrument endowing the corresponding waqf is missing. After the great fire of 1756 the building was restored during the reign of Sultan Mustafa III (r. 1757-74) by Kazgan Asan Aĝa, and assigned to the nearby medrese.

== Description ==
The building has a square plan and is topped by a low octagonal dome with pendentives. Inside the building four niches are located in the corners. Underground there is a burial crypt with eight niches covered by a dome vault. The masonry of the lower part is made of ashlar, while in the upper part it consists of bricks. A Byzantine cistern is still extant close to the building.
