= Zeyrek =

- Neighbourhood
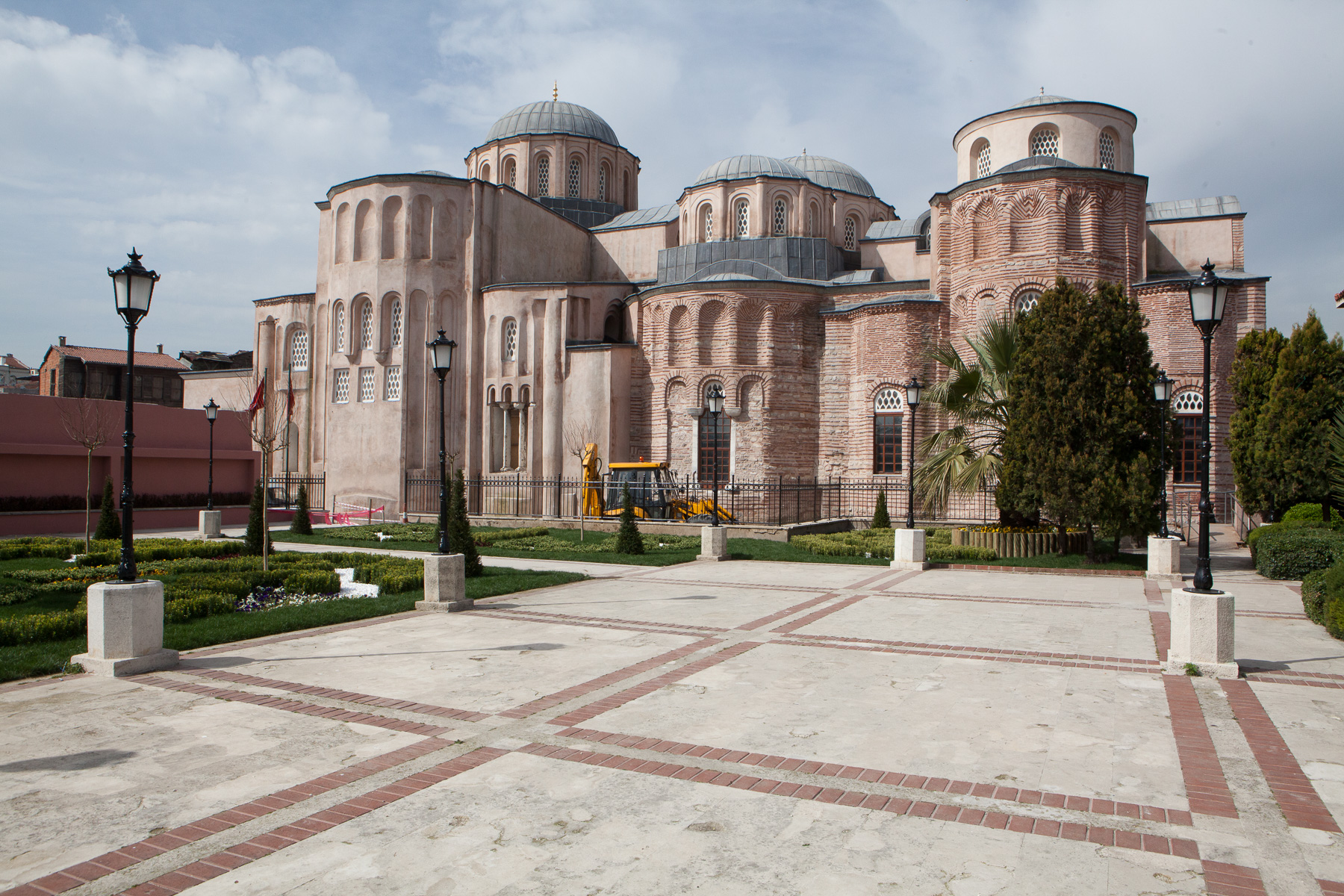
- Zeyrek Mosque

- Location within Turkey Location within Istanbul
- Coordinates: 41°1′11″N 28°57′26″E
- Country: Turkey
- Province: Istanbul
- District: Fatih
- Population (2022): 12,863
- Time zone: UTC+3 (TRT)

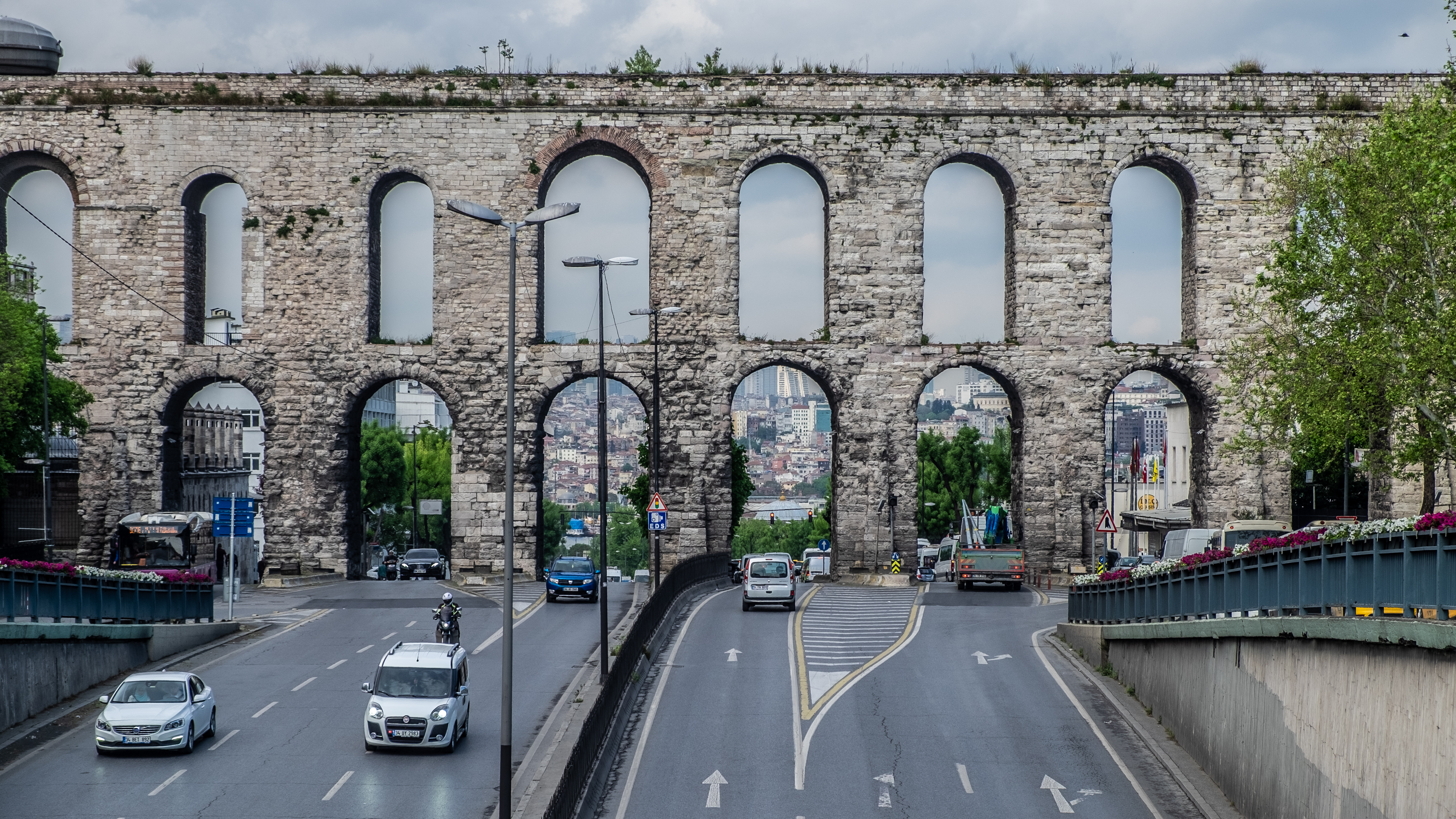
Aqueduct of Valens in Zeyrek

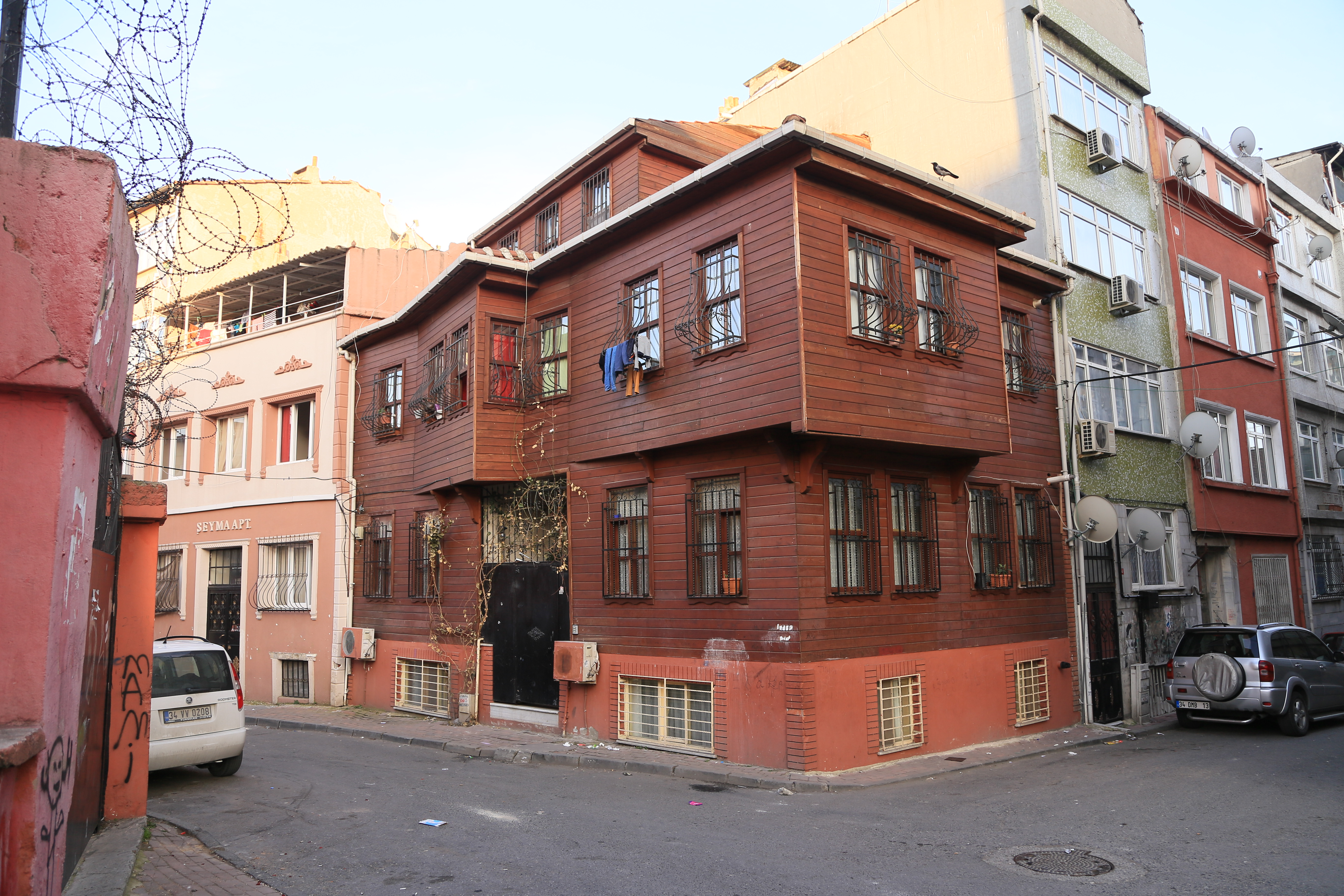
Zeyrek old wooden houses on Ibadethane Sk.

Zeyrek is a neighbourhood in the municipality and district of Fatih, Istanbul Province, Turkey. Its population is 12,863 (2022). It is a picturesque but poor neighbourhood. It takes its name from the huge and prominent Zeyrek Mosque which started life as a Byzantine church and sits on a plateau, overlooking the Golden Horn.

Busy Atatürk Bulvarı runs along the south side of Zeyrek which sits above the Cibali neighbourhood. To its north is the Fatih neighbourhood. Fevzi Paşa Caddesi runs along the western side of Zeyrek.

The centre of Zeyrek forms part of the Historic Areas of Istanbul World Heritage Site. Some of the old wooden houses here were restored in the early 21st century.

The closest tram stop to Zeyrek is Cibali on the T5 tram line. The closest Metro stop is Vezneciler on the M2 line. Many buses lough up and down Atatürk Bulvarı.

== Attractions ==
Zeyrek Mosque started life as the Monastery of the Pantokrator as built by Empress Eirene between 1118 and ii24. It consisted originally of a church, a hospital and a library. Between 1120 and 1136 Emperor John II Comnenus added a second church to the complex. Later a funerary chapel was built between the two churches as a burial place for the Comneni family. A clue to how grand the complex was in its heyday is shown by the Pala d'Oro in the Basilica of St Mark which was stolen by the Fourth Crusaders in 1204 and carried away to adorn Venice. After the Conquest of Istanbul in 1453 the complex was converted into Zeyrek Mosque; its ancillary buildings served as medreses until the huge Fatih Mosque complex was completed. Extensive and sometimes controversial restoration of the complex took place in the 2000s and 2010s. It is now open to visitors again as a mosque with its fine opus sectile floor hidden under carpet.

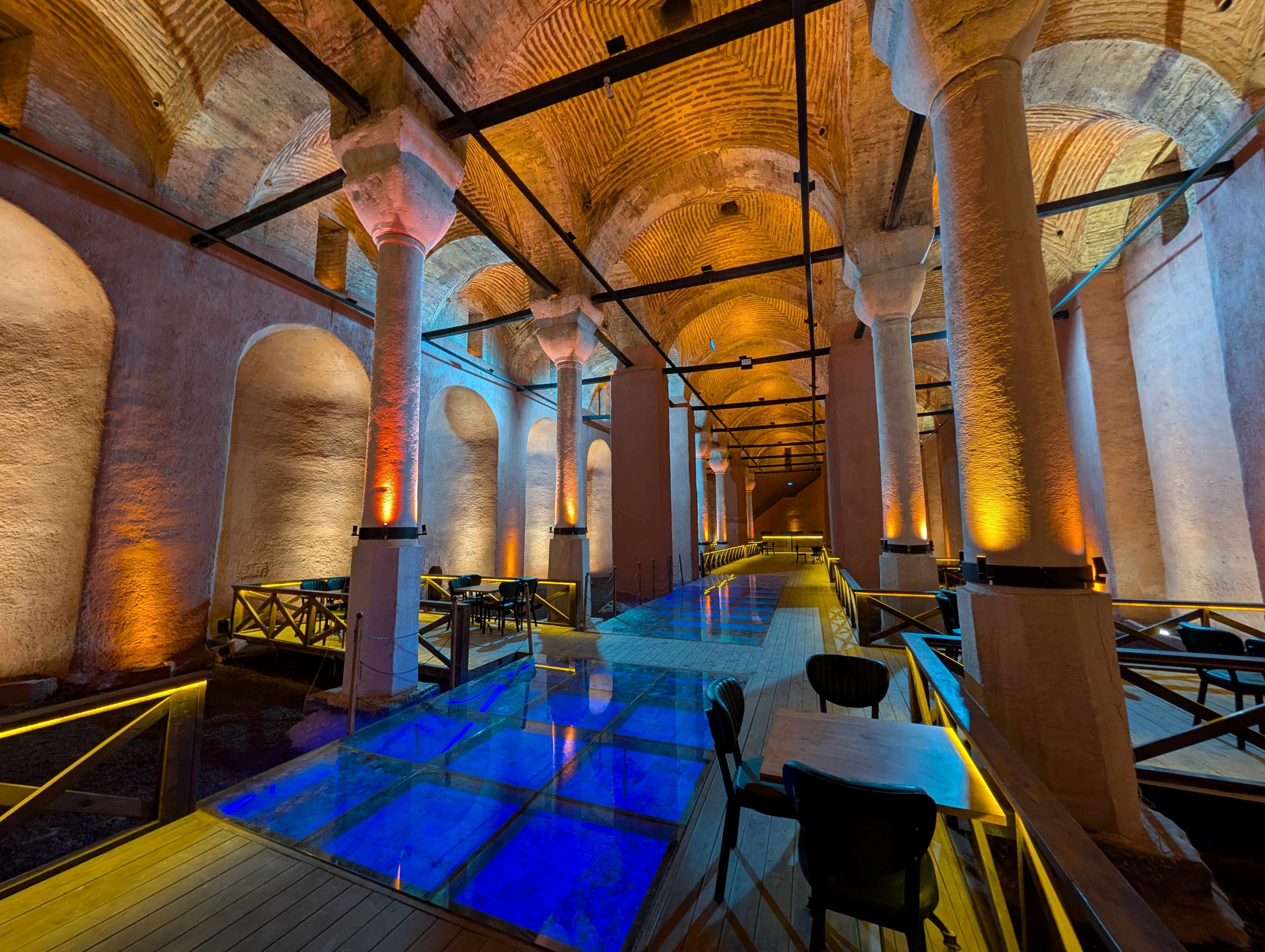
Zeyrek Cistern in Istanbul

Beneath the Zeyrek Mosque, along busy Atatürk Bulvarı (pushed through the area by the French town planner Henri Prost in the 1950s), a large brick cistern with niches along its facade can be seen. It has been recently restored and it is now open to the public. Also along the main road are buildings of the SSK department that were designed by the architect Sedad Hakki Eldem and won an Aga Khan award for architecture in 1986.

The small Şeyh Süleyman Mosque, also of Byzantine origin, may have been a library associated with the Monastery of the Pantokrator although this is not certain.

The Eski Imaret Mosque also started life as a Byzantine religious structure, this time the Convent of the Pantepoptes, built in around 1185 for Empress Anna Delessena who was co-regent with her son Alexios I Comnenos for twenty years before retiring here. It became an imaret (soup kitchen) after the Conquest of Istanbul in 1453 until a purpose-built soup kitchen was incorporated into the brand-new Fatih Mosque.

To the west of Zeyrek Mosque sits the rectangular area around the Hüsambey Tezgahçılar Mosque. It is ringed with food shops and restaurants serving the cuisine of Siirt in southeastern Turkey, in particular büryan kebab, lamb baked in pit ovens, and perde pilav, a risotto of chicken, grapes and almonds baked in a fez-shaped pastry case. Traditionally known as the Kadinlar Pazarı (Women's Bazaar), it is more usually called Fatih Pazarı (Fatih Bazaar) now. It is also known popularly as Little Siirt.

Framing the bazaar area are the remains of the Aqueduct of Valens, AKA as Bozdoğan Kemeri (Bozdoğan Aqueduct), constructed in 375 by the Emperor Valens reusing stones taken from ancient Chalcedon that used to exist on the site now filled by Kadıköy on the Asian side of the city. The aqueduct was used to bring water from Thrace (Trakya) into Constantinople for distribution around the city.

Also pressed up against the aqueduct is the Gazanfer Agha Medrese, built at the very end of the 16th century for the last Chief of the White Eunuchs of Topkapı Palace. For many years it contained a Cartoon Museum which has now closed.
