= Eski Imaret Mosque =

Mosque in Istanbul, Turkey

Eski Imaret Mosque Eski Imaret Câmîi
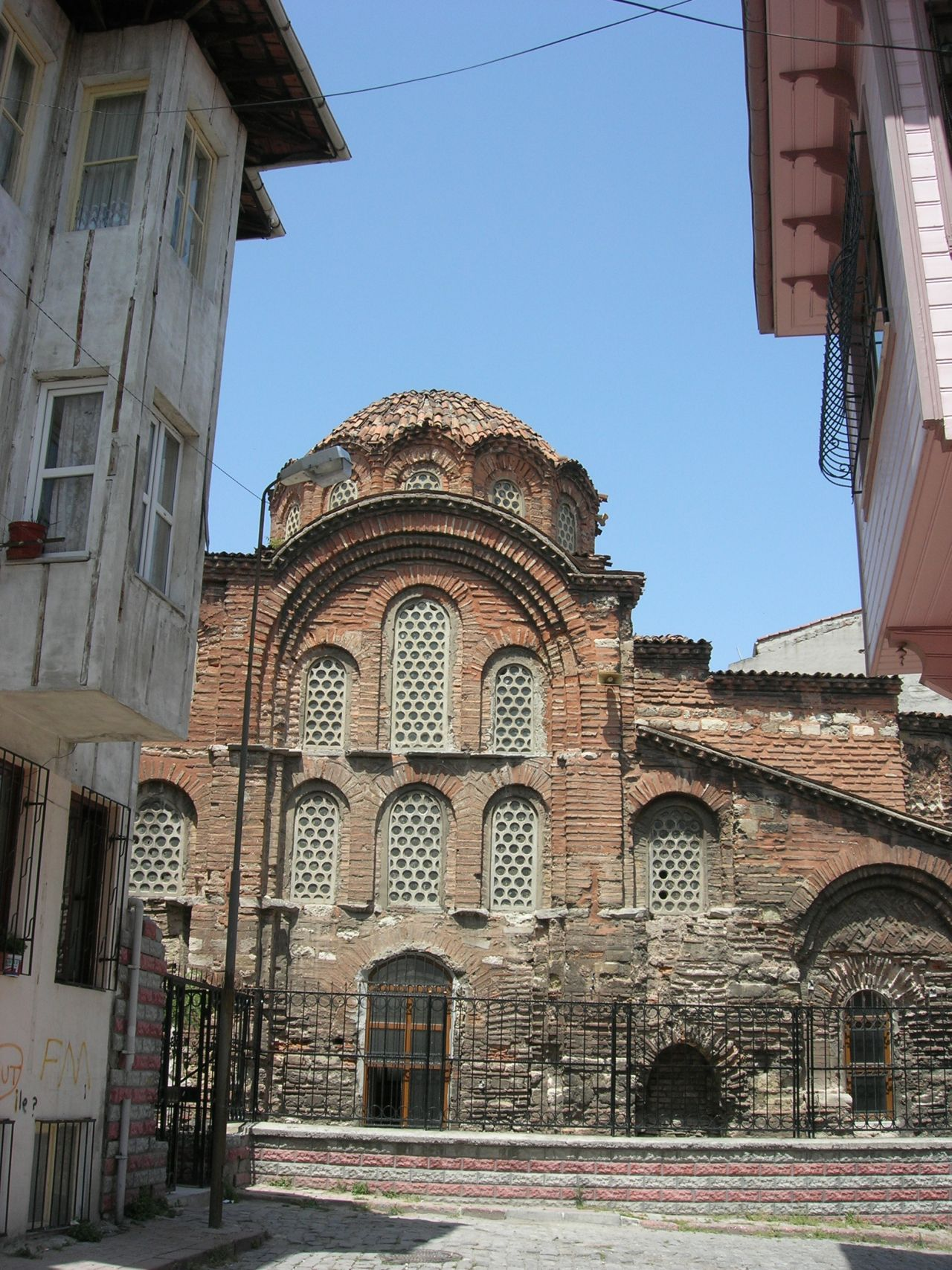
- The mosque viewed from the south.

- Location in the Fatih district of Istanbul

Religion
- Affiliation: Sunni Islam
- Year consecrated: Short after 1453

Location
- Location: Istanbul, Turkey
- Coordinates: 41°1′18″N 28°57′18″E

Architecture
- Type: church with cross-in-square plan
- Style: Middle Byzantine - Comnenian
- Completed: Short before 1087
- Materials: brick, stone

The Eski Imaret Mosque (Turkish: Eski Imaret Camii) is a former Byzantine church converted into a mosque by the Ottomans. The church has traditionally been identified as belonging to the Monastery of Christ Pantepoptes (Greek: Μονή του Χριστού Παντεπόπτη), meaning "Christ the all-seeing". It is the only documented 11th-century church in Istanbul which survives intact, and represents a key monument of middle Byzantine architecture. Despite that, it remains among the least studied buildings in the city.

== Location ==
The building lies in Istanbul, in the district of Fatih, in the neighbourhood of Zeyrek, one of the poorest areas inside the old walled city. It is less than one kilometre northwest of the even more impressive Zeyrek Mosque.

== Identification ==
It was the Patriarch Constantius I (1830–1834) who identified the Eski Imaret Mosque as the old Pantepoptes church. Although this identification has been generally accepted, Cyril Mango argued that its location didn't allow a complete overview of the Golden Horn, and instead suggested the site currently occupied by the Yavuz Sultan Selim Mosque as an alternative placing for the Pantepoptes Monastery. Austay-Effenberger and Effenberger agreed with Mango, and argued that it might actually have been the Church of St. Constantine, founded by the Empress Theophano in the early 10th century, highlighting its similarities to the contemporaneous Lips Monastery.

== History ==
Some time before 1087, Anna Dalassena, mother of the Byzantine Emperor Alexius I Comnenus, built a convent dedicated to Christos Pantepoptes on the summit of the fourth of Constantinople's seven hills where she retired at the end of her life, following Imperial custom. The convent included a church, also dedicated to the Pantepoptes.

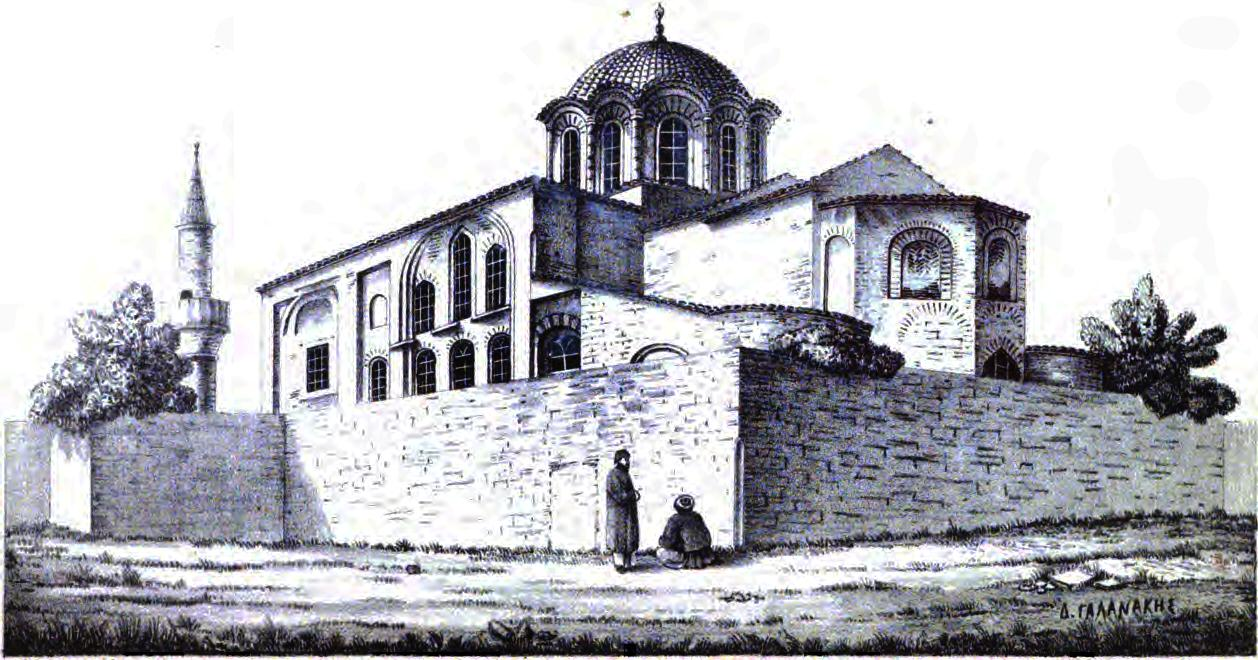
the Monastery of Pantepoptou, by Paspatēs, Alexandros Geōrgiou, 1877

On April 12, 1204, during the siege of Constantinople, Emperor Alexios V Doukas Mourtzouphlos established his headquarters near the monastery. From this vantage point he could watch the Venetian fleet under the command of Doge Enrico Dandolo deploying between the monastery of the Euergetes and the church of St. Mary of the Blachernae before attacking the city. After the successful attack he took flight abandoning his purple tent on the spot, thus allowing Baldwin of Flanders to spend his victory night inside it. The complex was sacked by the Crusaders, and afterwards it was assigned to Benedictine monks from San Giorgio Maggiore in Rome. During the Latin occupation of Constantinople (1204–1261) the building became a Roman Catholic church.

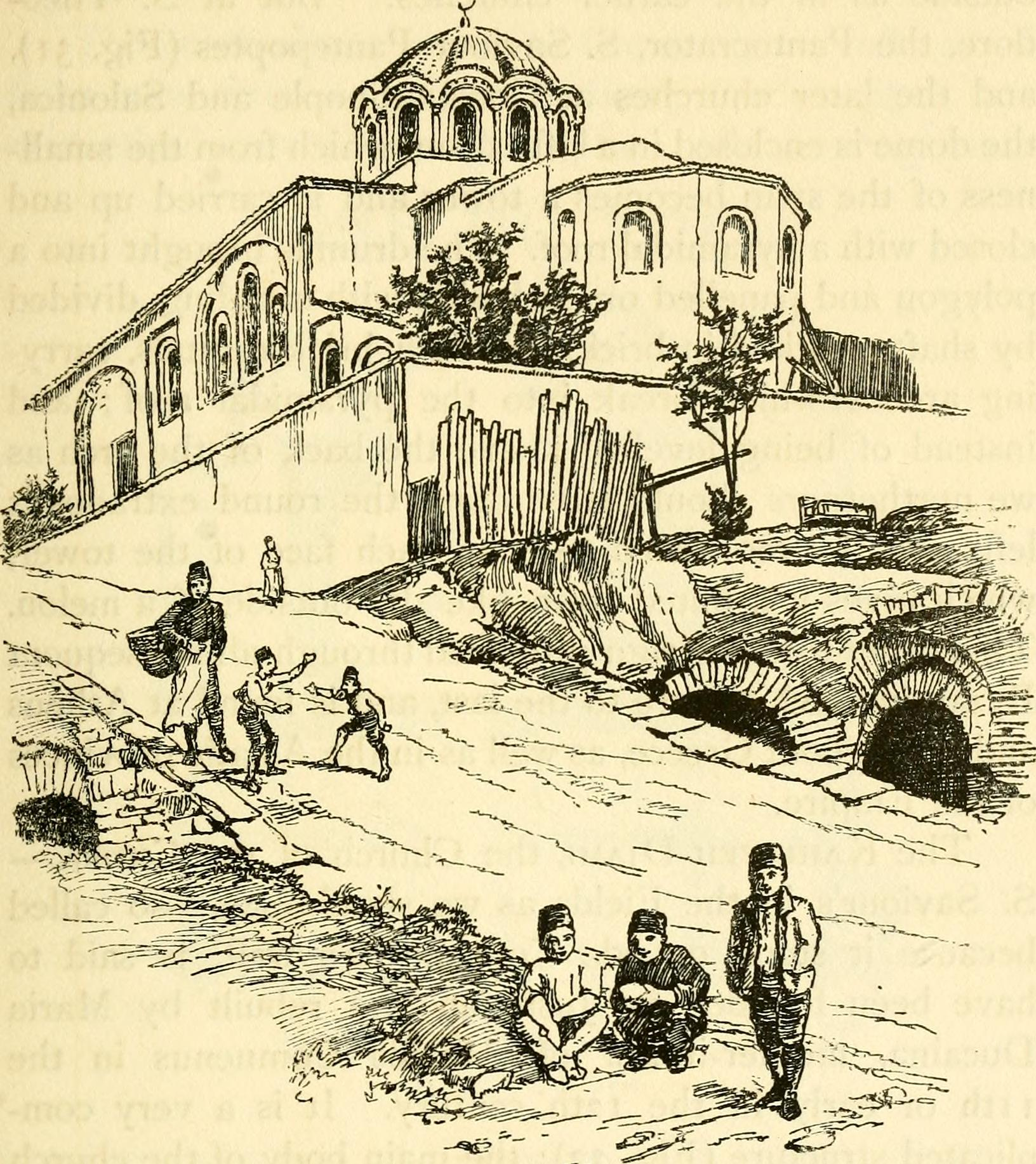
Byzantine and Romanesque architecture (1913) by Sir Jackson, Thomas Graham

Immediately after the Ottoman conquest of Constantinople in 1453, the church became a mosque, while the monastic buildings were used as a zaviye, medrese and imaret for the nearby Fatih Mosque, which was then under construction. The Turkish name for the mosque ("Old Soup Kitchen Mosque") recall this.

The complex has been ravaged by fire several times, and the last traces of the monastery disappeared about a century ago. Until 1970 the building was used as a Koran school, which rendered it largely inaccessible for architectural study. In 1970, the mosque was partially closed off and restored by the Turkish architect Fikret Çuhadaroğlu.

== Restoration ==
It has been restored twice: once in the 1970s by architect Fikret Çuhadaroglu; and again during an unauthorized restoration in the 1990s.

Its undulating roofline, obscured by a single flat roof in Ottoman times, was rebuilt in the 1970 restoration.

In 2015, restoration works began on the Eski Imaret Mosque with an expected opening date of 2019, however this was later halted for unknown reason.

As of 2024, the Eski Imaret Mosque is still under restoration.

== Architecture ==
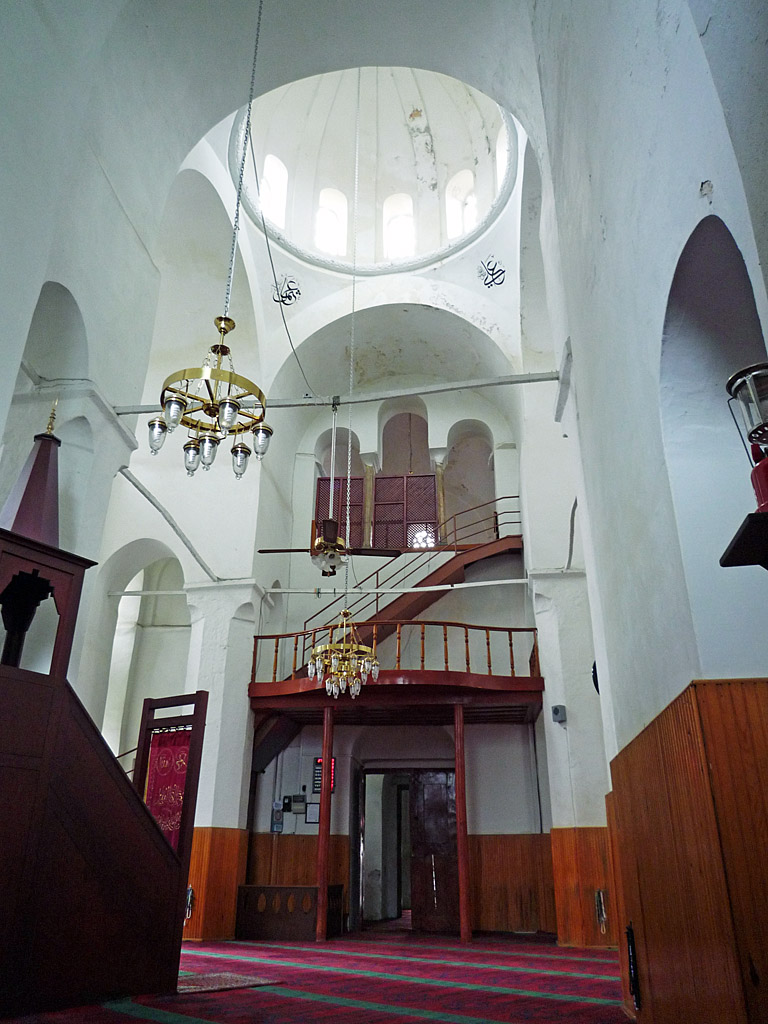
Interior view

The building lies on a slope which overlooks the Golden Horn, and rests on a platform which is the ceiling of a cistern. It is hemmed in all sides, making inspection of the exterior difficult. Its masonry consists of brick and stone, and uses the recessed brick technique; it is the oldest extant building of Constantinople in which this technique - which is typical of the Middle Byzantine architecture - can be observed, . In this technique, alternate courses of bricks are mounted behind the line of the wall in a mortar bed. The thickness of the mortar layers is roughly three times greater than that of the brick layers. The brick tiles on the roof are unique among the churches and mosques of Istanbul, which are otherwise covered with lead.

The plan belongs to the cross-in-square (or quincunx) type with a central dome and four vaulted crossarms, a sanctuary to the east and an esonarthex and an exonarthex to the west. This appears to be an addition of the Palaiologan period, replacing an older portico, and is divided into three bays. The lateral ones are surmounted by cross vaults, the central one by a dome.

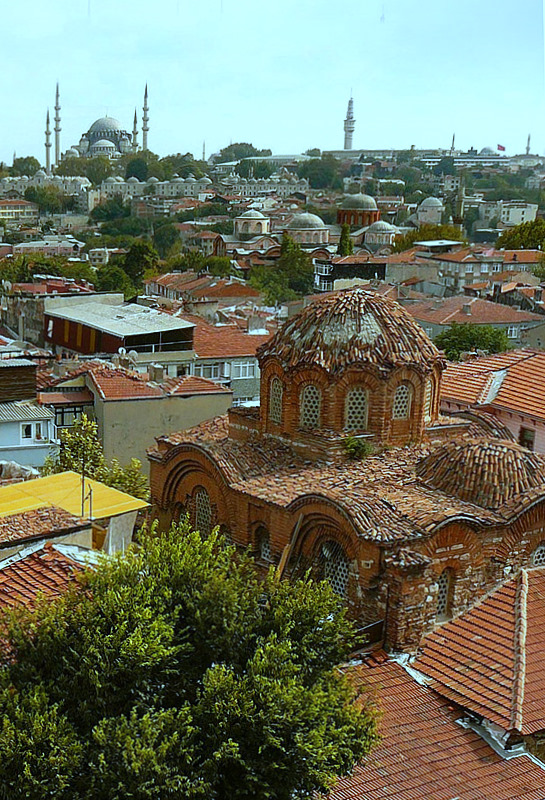
An aerial view showing the location of the building. In the background are the Molla Zeyrek Mosque, Şeyh Ebül Vefa Mosque and Mausoleum, Suleymaniye Mosque and Beyazıt Tower.

A unique feature of this building is the U-shaped gallery which runs over the narthex and the two western bays of the quincunx. The gallery has windows opening towards both the naos and the crossarm. It is possible that the gallery was built for the private use of the Empress-Mother.

As in many of the surviving Byzantine churches of Istanbul, the four columns which supported the crossing were replaced by piers, and the colonnades at either ends of the crossarms were filled in. The piers divide the nave into three aisles. The side aisles lead into small clover-leaf-shaped chapels to the east, connected to the sanctuary and ended to the east, like the sanctuary, with an apse. These chapels are the prothesis and diaconicon. The Ottomans resurfaced the apses and added a minaret, since lost.

The dome, which during the Ottoman period was given a helmet-like shape, recovered its original scalloped roofline in the restoration of 1970. This is typical of the churches of the Macedonian period. The tent-like roofing of the gallery has also been replaced with tiles that follow the curves of the vaulting.

The exterior has occasional decorative motifs, like sunbursts, meanders, basket-wave patterns and cloisonnés: the latter motif is typical of the Greek architecture of this period but unknown elsewhere in Constantinople. Of the original interior, nothing remains but some marble mouldings, cornices, and doorframes.

== Gallery ==
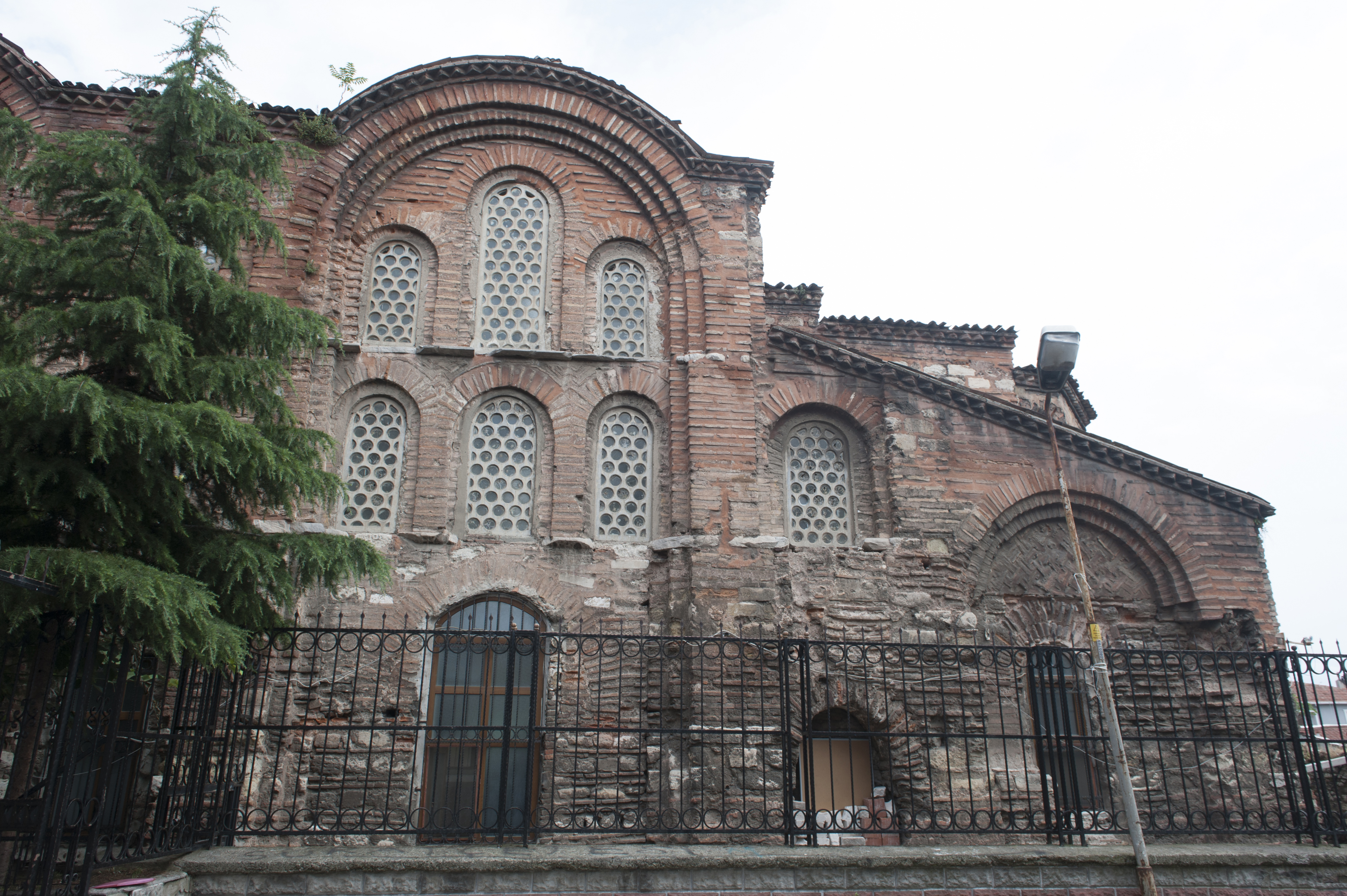
Eski Imaret Mosque facade

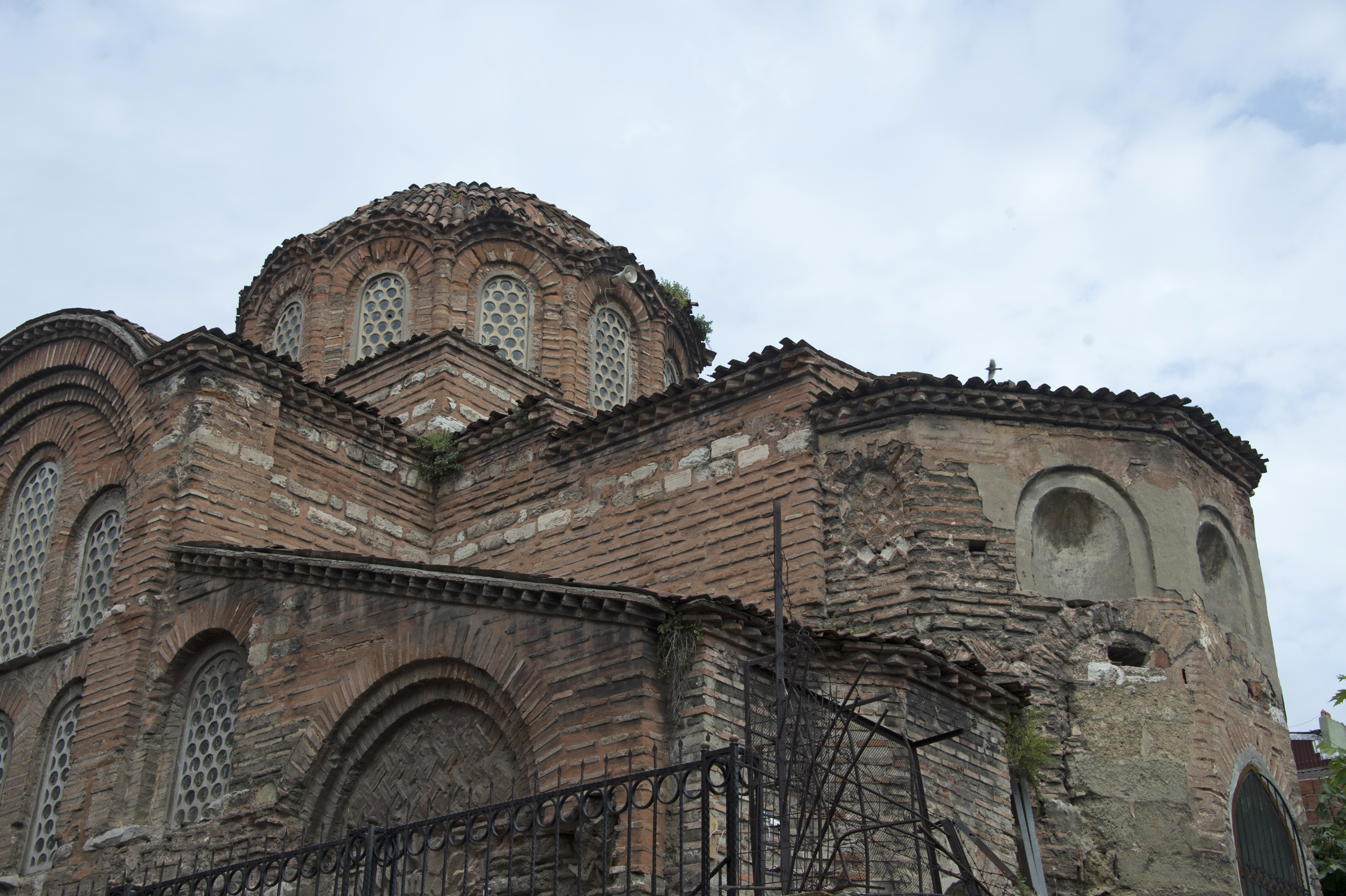
Eski Imaret Mosque dome and side

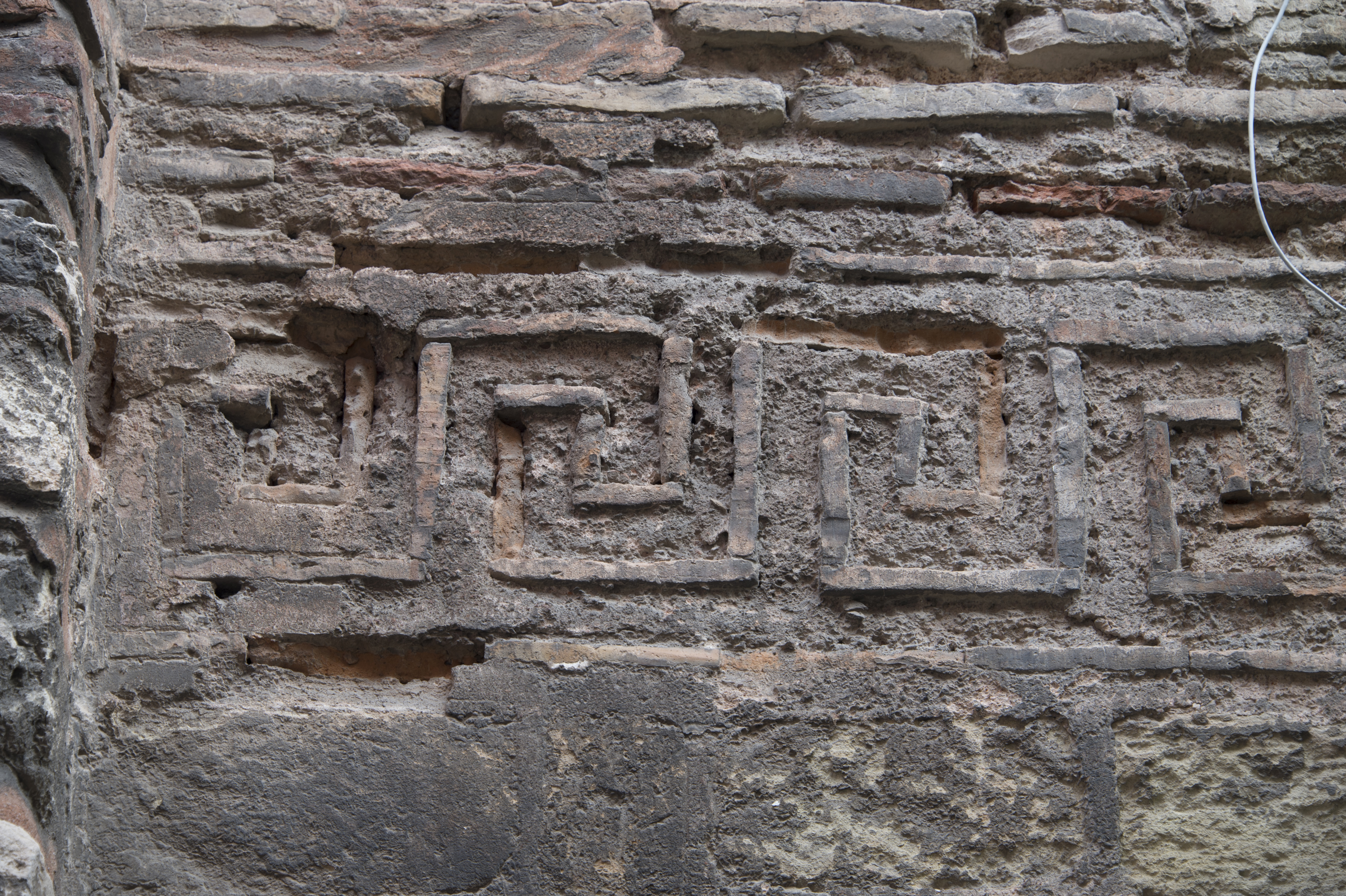
External decoration of Eski Imaret Mosque

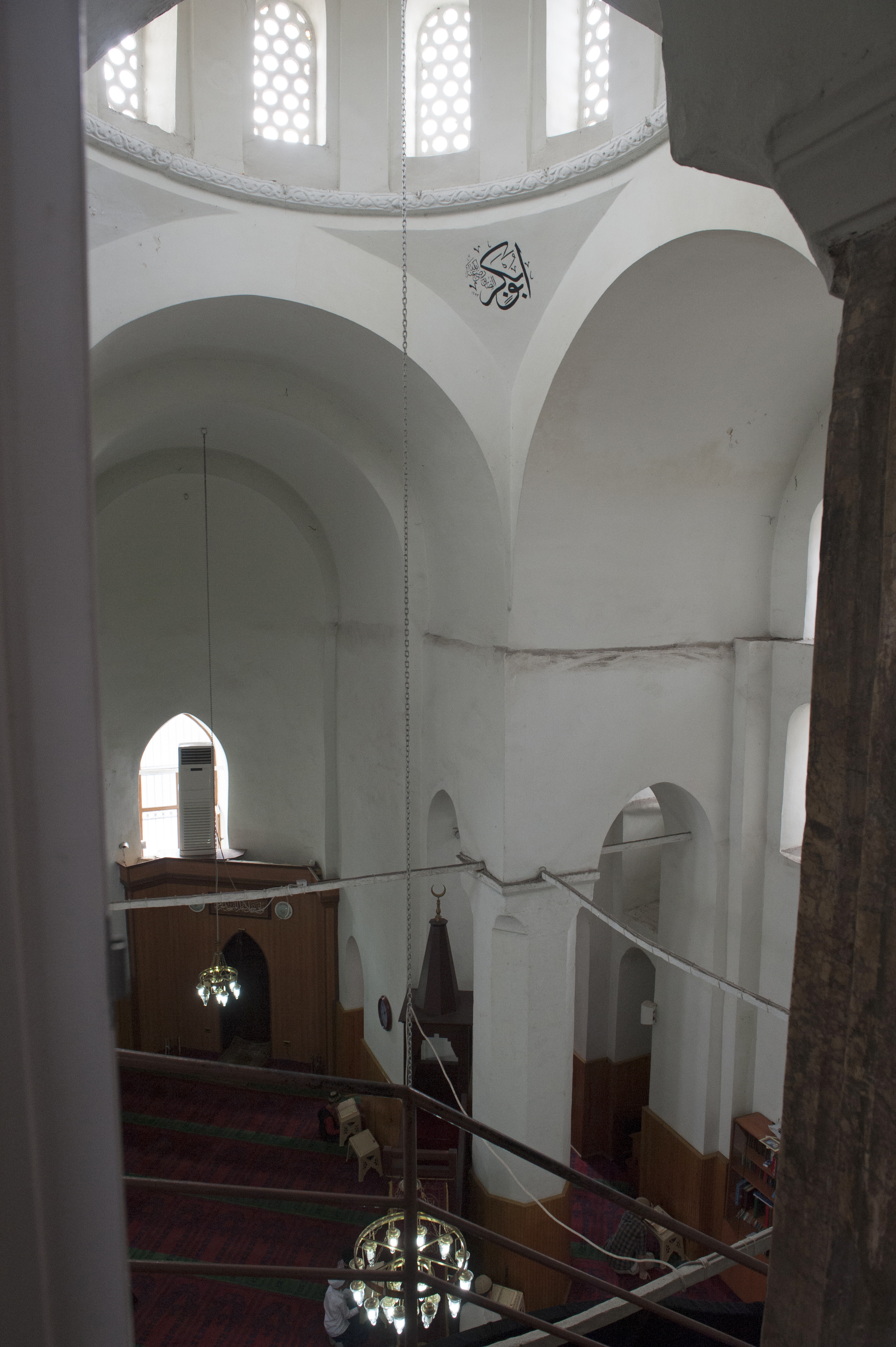
Eski Imaret Mosque: view from first floor

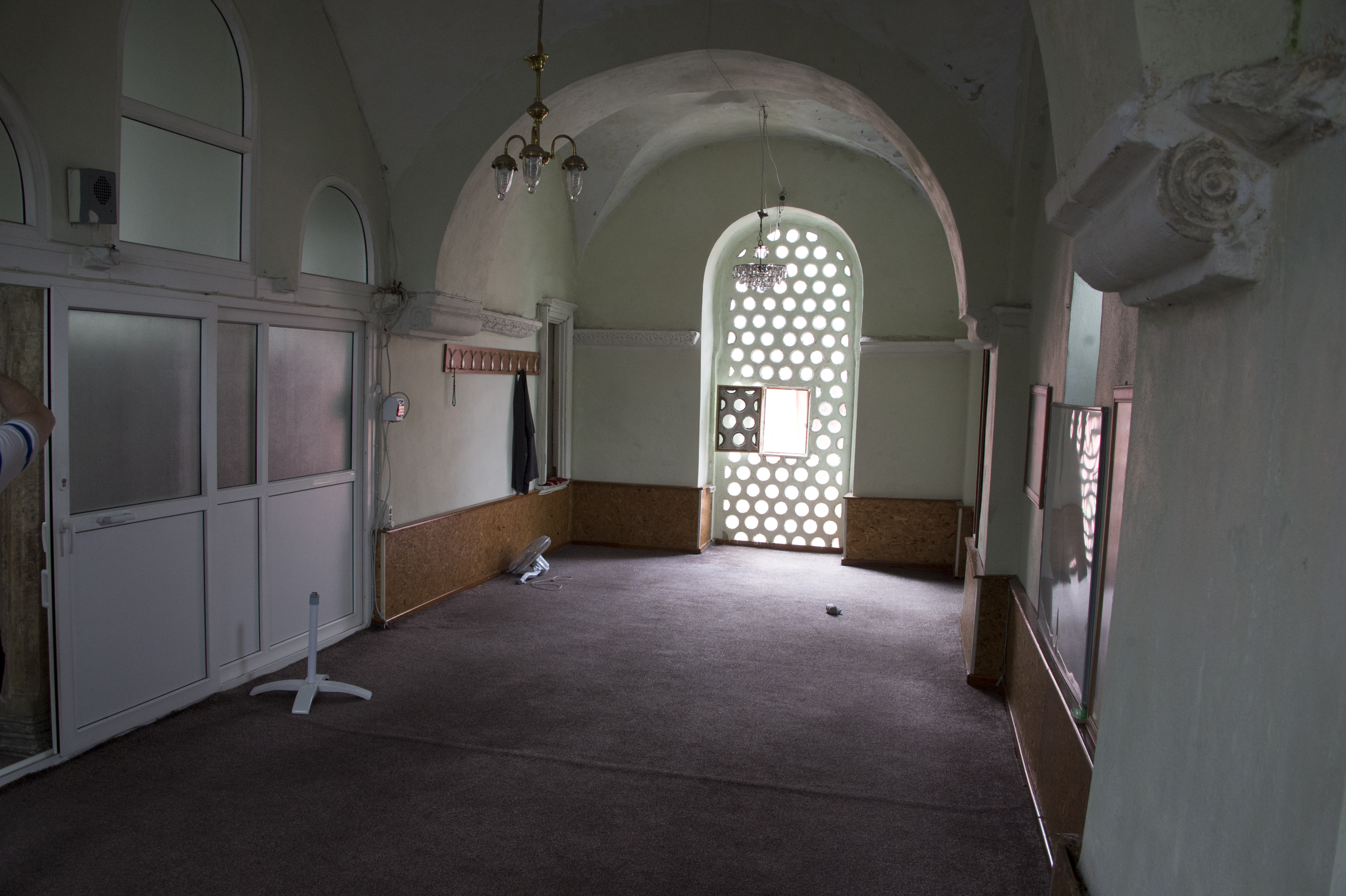
Eski Imaret Mosque corridor

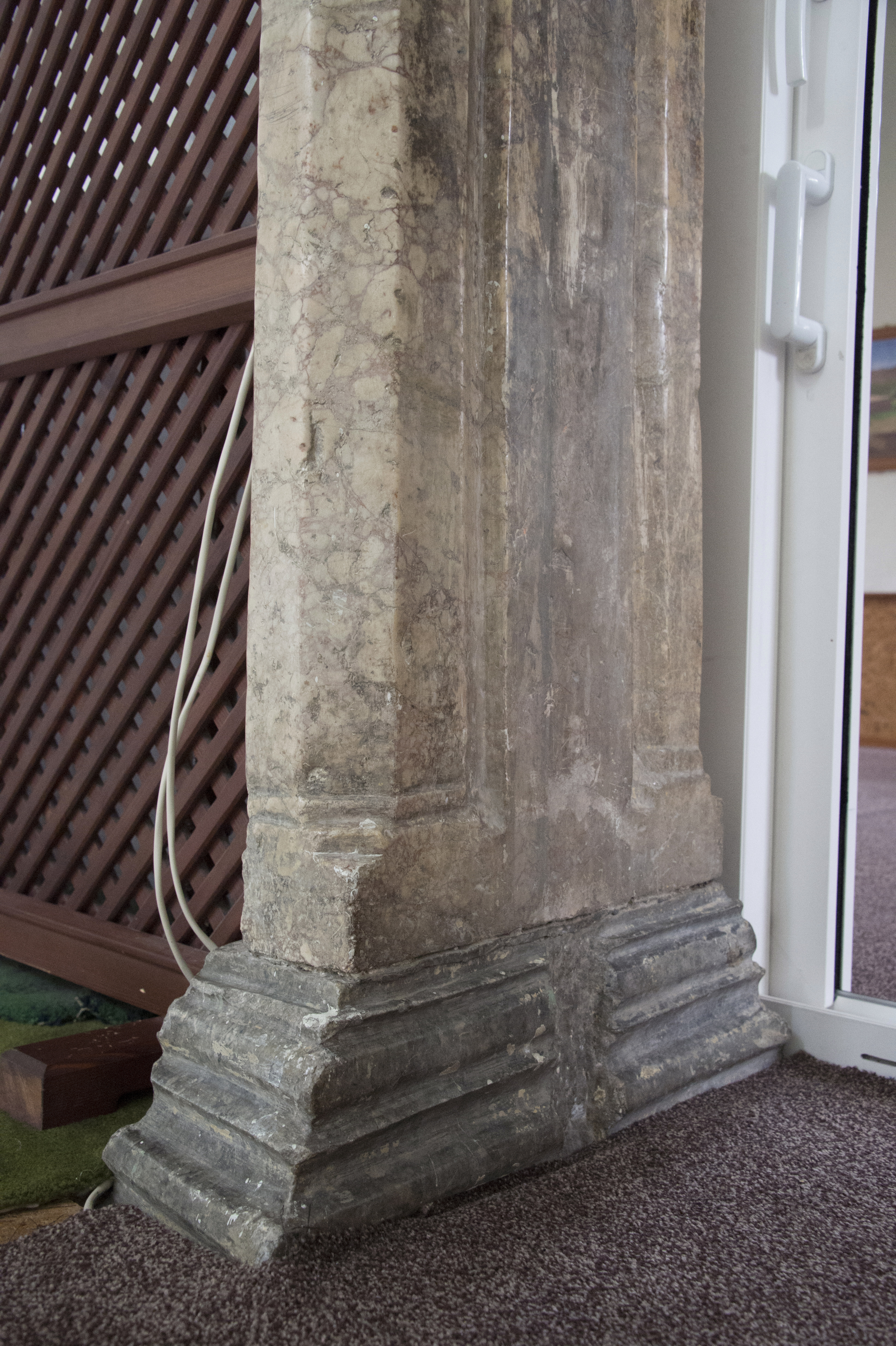
Eski Imaret Mosque column

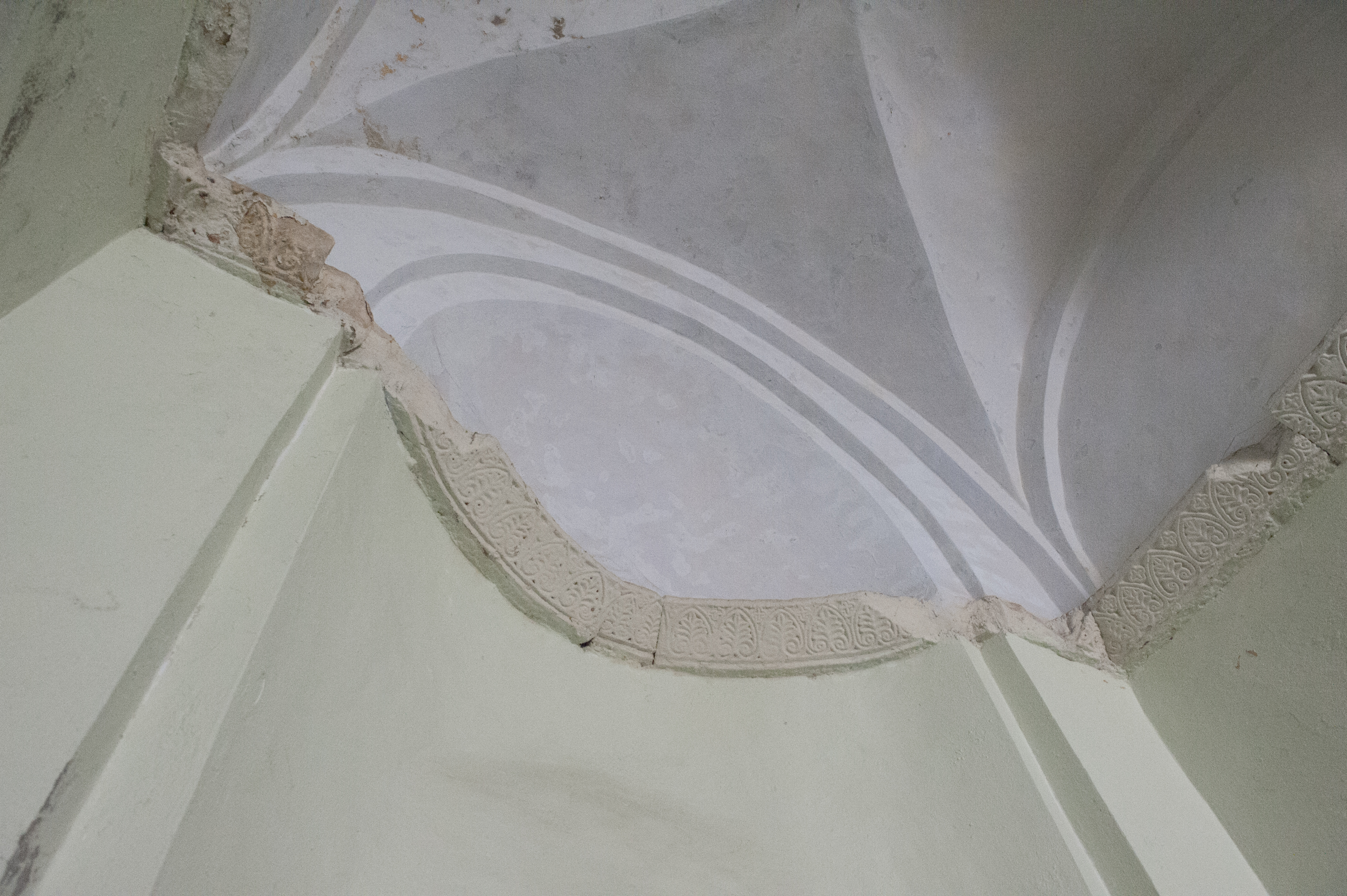
Eski Imaret Mosque

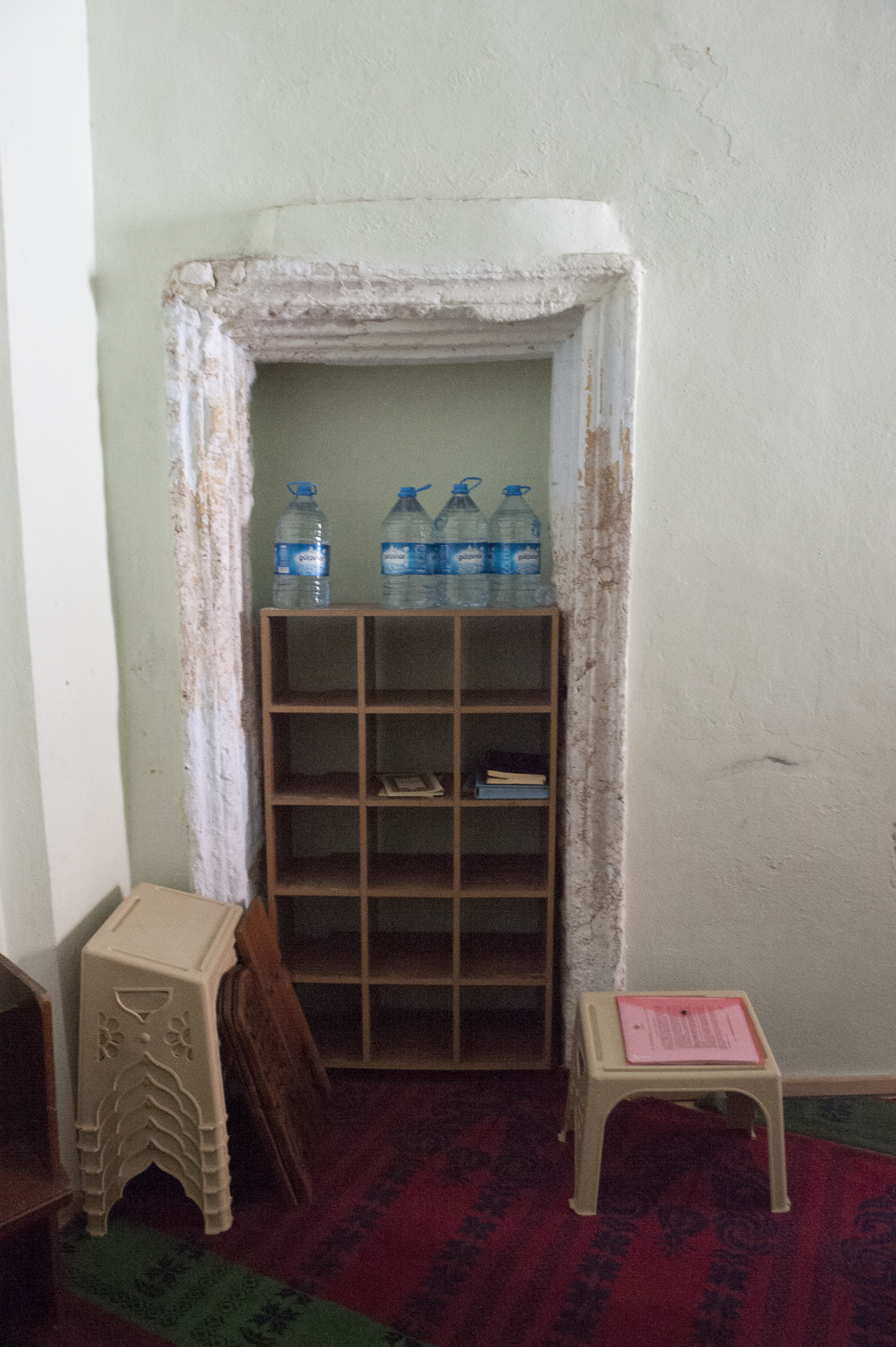
Eski Imaret Mosque

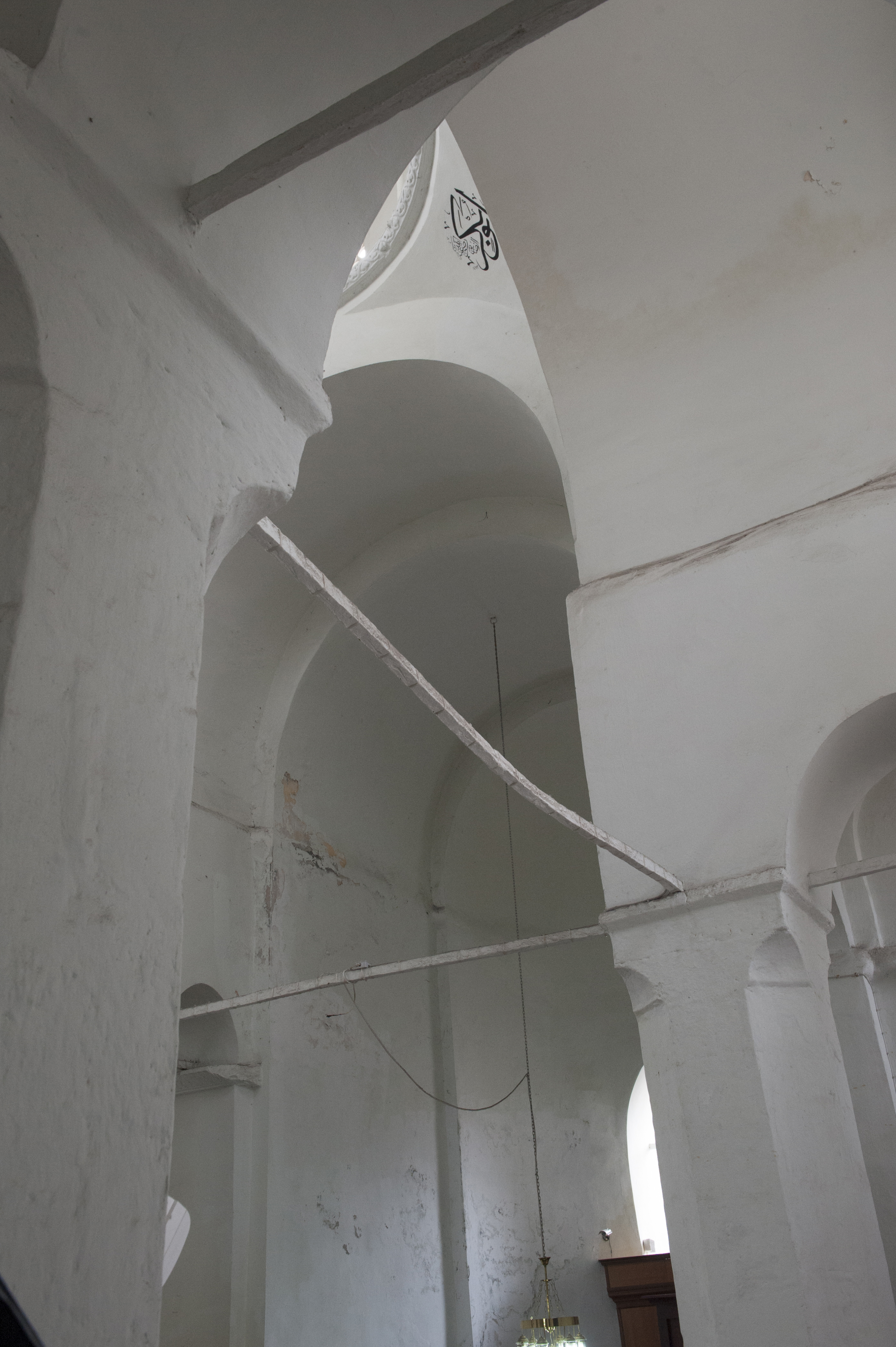
Eski Imaret Mosque

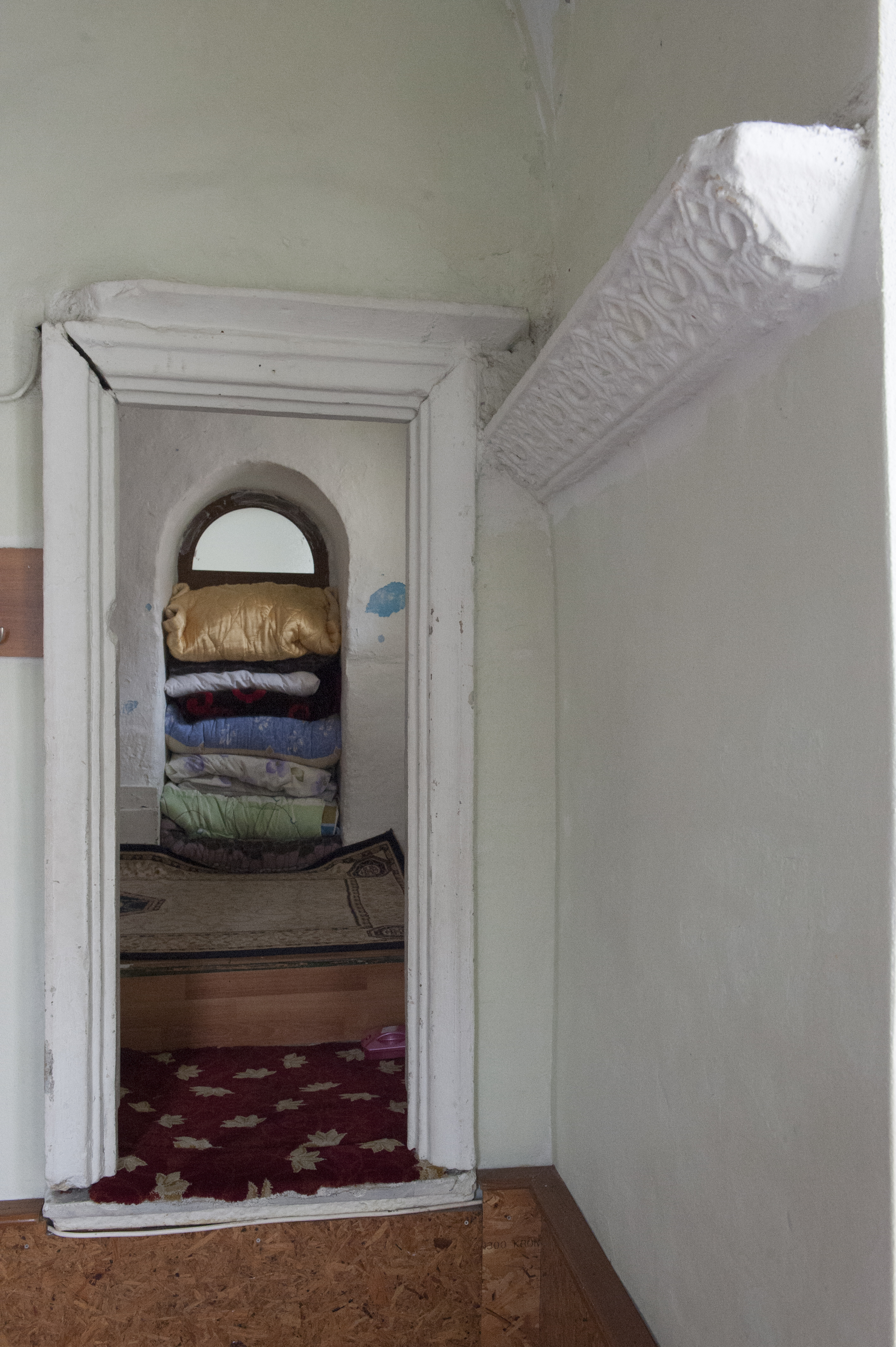
Eski Imaret Mosque

== Sources ==
- Van Millingen, Alexander (1912). Byzantine Churches in Constantinople. London: MacMillan & Co.
- Mathews, Thomas F. (1976). The Byzantine Churches of Istanbul: A Photographic Survey. University Park: Pennsylvania State University Press. ISBN 0-271-01210-2.
- Gülersoy, Çelik (1976). A guide to Istanbul. Istanbul: Istanbul Kitaplığı. OCLC 3849706.
- Müller-Wiener, Wolfgang (1977). Bildlexikon Zur Topographie Istanbuls: Byzantion, Konstantinupolis, Istanbul Bis Zum Beginn D. 17 Jh (in German). Tübingen: Wasmuth. ISBN 978-3-8030-1022-3.
- Krautheimer, Richard (1986). Architettura paleocristiana e bizantina (in Italian). Turin: Einaudi. ISBN 88-06-59261-0.
- Jacobi, David (2001). "The urban evolution of Latin Constantinople". In Necipoğlu, Nevra (ed.). Byzantine Constantinople: Monuments, Topography and everyday Life. Leiden, Boston, Köln: Brill. ISBN 90-04-11625-7.
- Asutay-Effenberger, Neslihan; Effenberger, Arne (2008). "Eski İmaret Camii, Bonoszisterne und Konstantinsmauer". Jahrbuch der österreichischen Byzantinistik (in German). 58: 13–44. doi:10.1553/joeb58s13. ISBN 978-3-7001-6132-5.
