= Touring and Automobile Club of Turkey =

Automobile organization in Turkey

Touring and Automobile Club of Turkey Türkiye Turing ve Otomobil Kurumu
- Abbreviation: TTOK
- Formation: 1923
- Type: INGO
- Purpose: Touring
- Headquarters: Şişli, Istanbul, Turkey
- Coordinates: 41°05′57″N 29°00′19″E
- Region served: Turkey
- Members: Fédération Internationale de l'Automobile (FIA); Alliance Internationale de Tourisme (AIT)
- President: Dr. Bulent Katkak
- Website: www.turing.org.tr

The Touring and Automobile Club of Turkey (Turkish: Türkiye Turing ve Otomobil Kurumu) (TTOK), also known as Turkish Automobile Association, is an amateur and international organization dedicated to tourism and the automobile sector. It was founded in 1923 at the behest of Mustafa Kemal Atatürk by a group of intellectuals led by Reşit Saffet Atabinen, a diplomat at the time and a historian. The club is a member of Fédération Internationale de l'Automobile (FIA) and Alliance Internationale de Tourisme (AIT).

== History ==
The association was established right after the proclamation of the Republic as "Turkish Travel Association" (Turkish: Türk Seyyahin Cemiyeti). It was renamed later to "Touring Club Turc" (Turkish: Türkiye Turing Klöbü). In 1930, the association received the legal status of a non-profit organization, and gained rights with regard to customs and traffic laws.

The club, working for many years in the beginning as a governmental agency, served in the fields of tourism, culture and technical issues. Highly needed materials for tourism such as prospectuses, posters, tourist guides and road maps in the early period of the newly founded republic were prepared and published by the association. Furthermore, it established and organized the first language courses, tourist guide exams, tourism congresses and conferences.

The association, located in an office at Galata, Istanbul with two rooms only and with two employees, had the assistance of a small number of volunteers with wide travelling experience. Despite its limited personal and financial resources, it achieved remarkable success.

An important event in the history of the club was the hosting of a meeting of the International Touring Alliance (AIT), the club became a member of shortly. For this purpose, Atatürk ordered the formally opening of Dolmabahçe Palace to public for the first time since the abolition of the Ottoman Sultanate. He announced to the Istanbul press that the Touring Club Association will be under his personal protection.

In order to keep up with increasing requirements following the economic developments at home and abroad during the 1950s, the association moved its office to another places and expanded its workforce step by step.

In 1971, the club signed an agreement with the Ministry of Customs and Finance to charge commission for temporary import license at the border that was granted to abroad living Turkish people, who came to Turkey by car. This fee was fifty percent less than that was charged by the European associations. This income secured the club's financial source for projected activities.

Following the signing of an agreement with the Municipality of Istanbul in 1979, the club started, under the leadership of Çelik Gülersoy, a comprehensive cultural and touristic restoration project. Many historical buildings and palace parks were renovated and opened to public use as recreational venues, among them Chora Church environs (1977), Çamlıca Hill (1980), Malta and Çadır pavilions within Yıldız Park (1982), Yellow, Pink and White pavilions within Emirgan Park (1979–1983), Hotel Yeşil Ev (1984), Khedive Palace (1984) and Soğukçeşme Street (1985–1986)

The obligation to take a temporary import document from customs was lifted in 1990 resulting in a great income loss for the club. Finally in 1994, another source of its finance diminished as the administration of historical recreational venues ended when the city's municipality concluded not to renew the lease contract regarding the parks and pavilions in them. The club tried to overcome the financial difficulties by selling its properties one by one it owned from 1974 on.

== International documents provided ==
The Touring and Automobile Club of Turkey is authorized to provide following documents, which are recognized internationally:

- Temporary entrance card from customs
- International driving license
- International vehicle document
- International traffic insurance (Green card)
- Temporary entrance card for foreign vehicles (Blue card)

== Notable people ==
Following persons played a major role in the history of the club. Figures enclosed in parentheses are service years:

- Reşit Saffet Atabinen, founder and president (1923–1965)
- Said N.Duhani, manager (1950s-1966)
- Çelik Gülersoy, clerk (1947–1957), assistant manager (1957–1961), legal consultant (1961–1965), general manager (1965–2003)
- Dr. Uğur İbrahimhakkıoğlu, Vice President ( -2006), ex- president (2006–2010)
- Dr. Bülent Katkak. Current President. Has been exerting all his efforts since he took power doing fabulous jobs for the community, organizing social benefit events.
