= Endem TV Tower =

TV tower in Turkey

- Endem TV Tower

- Location within Istanbul
- Location: Büyükçekmece, Istanbul, Turkey
- Tower height: 216 m (709 ft)
- Coordinates: 41°01′34″N 28°37′15″E
- Built: 1998-2008

Endem TV Tower is a TV tower in Büyükçekmece, Istanbul, Turkey. It was built between 1998 and 2008, and has a now-closed revolving restaurant 154 m (505 ft) above ground, as well as an observation deck at 160 m (520 ft). The total height of the tower is 216 m (709 ft) including the antenna.

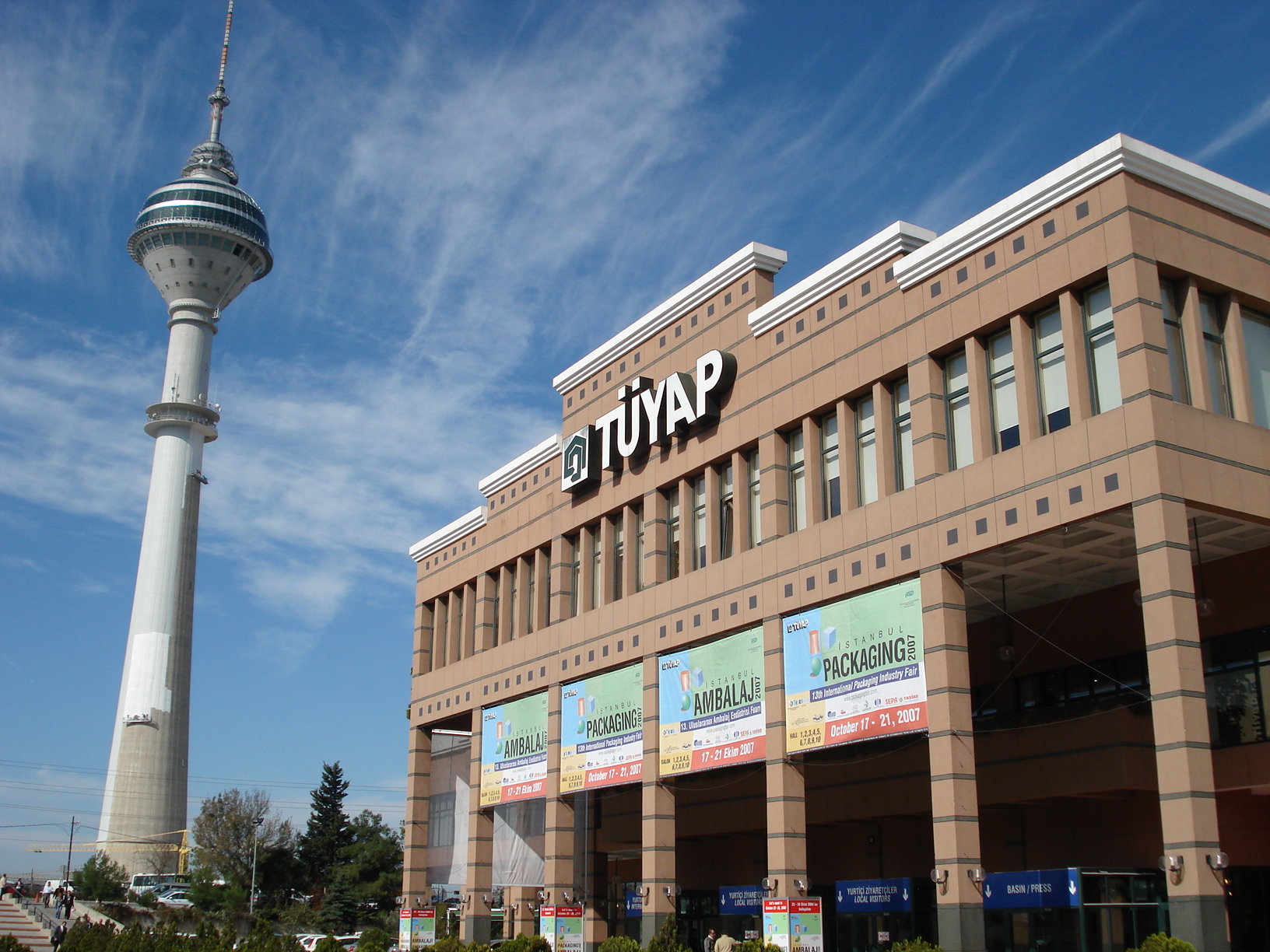
TÜYAP Fair and Endem Tv Tower

== Helicopter crash ==
On March 10, 2017, a Sikorsky S-76 helicopter owned by Swan Aviation hit the antenna of the TV tower in heavy fog and crashed onto the nearby highway State Road D100. All seven people on board were killed.

== See also ==
- Çamlıca TRT Television Tower
- Küçük Çamlıca TV Radio Tower
- List of columns and towers in Istanbul
