= Emirgan Park =

Historical urban park in the Sarıyer district of Istanbul, Turkey

- Emirgan Korusu; Emirgan Parkı
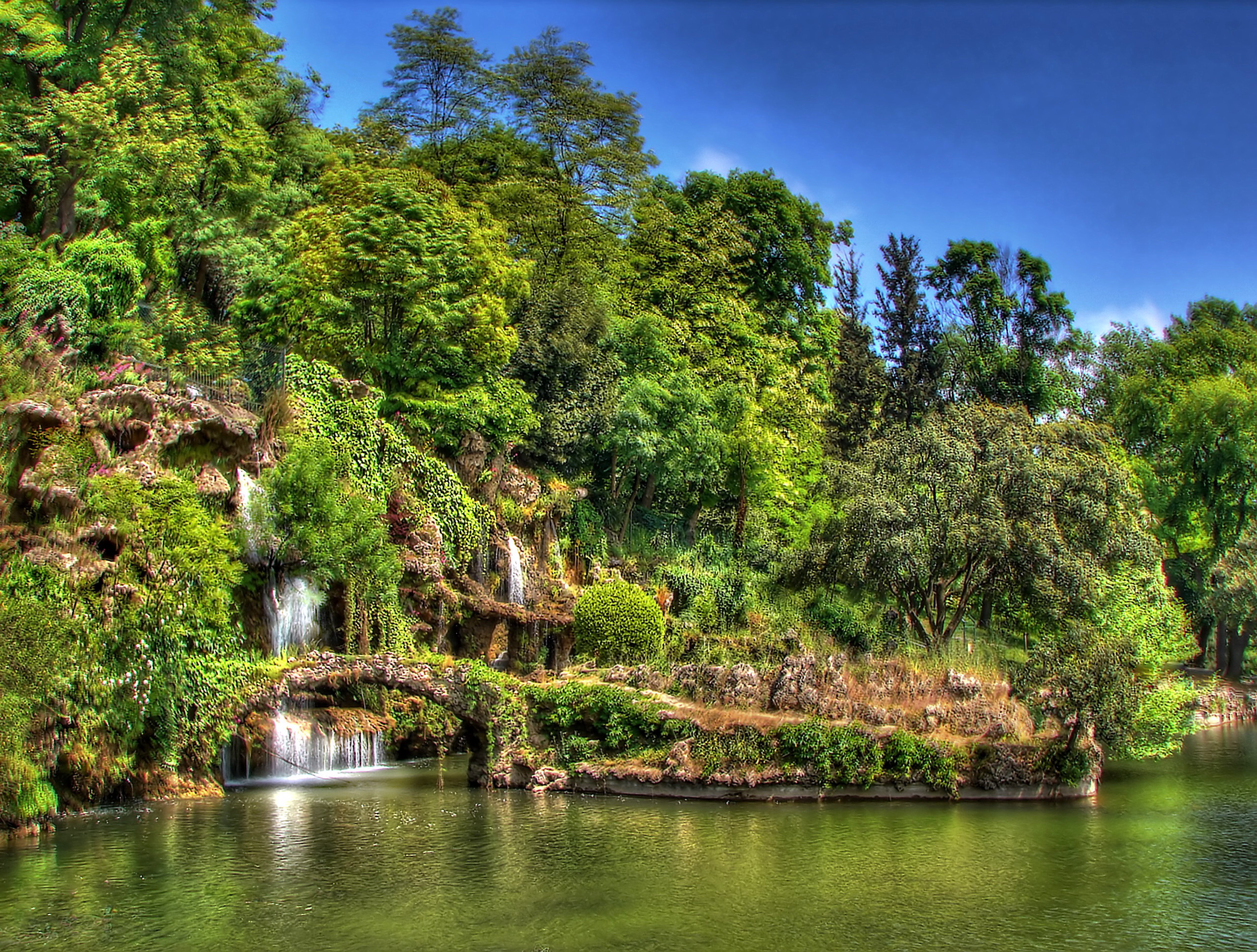
- A waterfall at Emirgan Park
- Interactive map of Emirgan Park
- Location: Istanbul, Turkey
- Coordinates: 41°06′30″N 29°03′09″E

Emirgan Park (Turkish: Emirgan Korusu or rarely Emirgan Parkı) is a historical urban park located in the Emirgan neighbourhood in the Sarıyer district of Istanbul, Turkey, on the European coast of the Bosphorus. It is one of the largest public parks in Istanbul.

== History ==
In the Byzantine era, the entire area where today the park stretches was covered with cypress trees and known as Kyparades or "Cypress Forest". In the Ottoman period, it became known as the "Feridun Bey Park", when the uninhabited land was granted in the mid-16th century to Nişancı Feridun Bey, a Lord Chancellor in rank in the Ottoman Empire.

In the 17th century, Ottoman Sultan Murad IV (reigned 1623–1640) presented the estate to Emir Gûne Han, a Safavid Persian commander, who surrendered his besieged castle without any resistance, and followed him back to Constantinople (now Istanbul). The name "Feridun Bey Park" was changed to "Emirgûne", which in time became corrupted to "Emirgan".

During the centuries, the estate's owner changed several times. By the end of the 1860s, Emirgan Park was owned by Isma'il Pasha, the Khedive of Egypt and Sudan (reigned 1863–1879). Although Egypt had been virtually independent since 1805, it legally remained a vassal state of the Ottoman Empire, and the Egyptian khedival family had married into the Ottoman sultanic family. After he was deposed as Khedive, with the throne of Egypt and Sudan passing to his son Tewfik Pasha, Isma'il initially took up residence in exile in Naples, before relocating permanently to Emirgan Park, where he lived in exile until his death. The area was used as the backyard of a large wooden yalı that Isma'il had ordered to be built on the shore of the Bosphorus strait. He also built within the park area three wooden pavilions, which still exist.

The heirs of the deposed Khedive sold the estate in the 1930s to Satvet Lütfi Tozan, a wealthy Turkish arms dealer. In the 1940s, he granted the park grounds, including the three pavilions, to the City of Istanbul during the office of Governor and Mayor Lütfi Kırdar (1938-1949).

== Present-day Emirgan Park ==
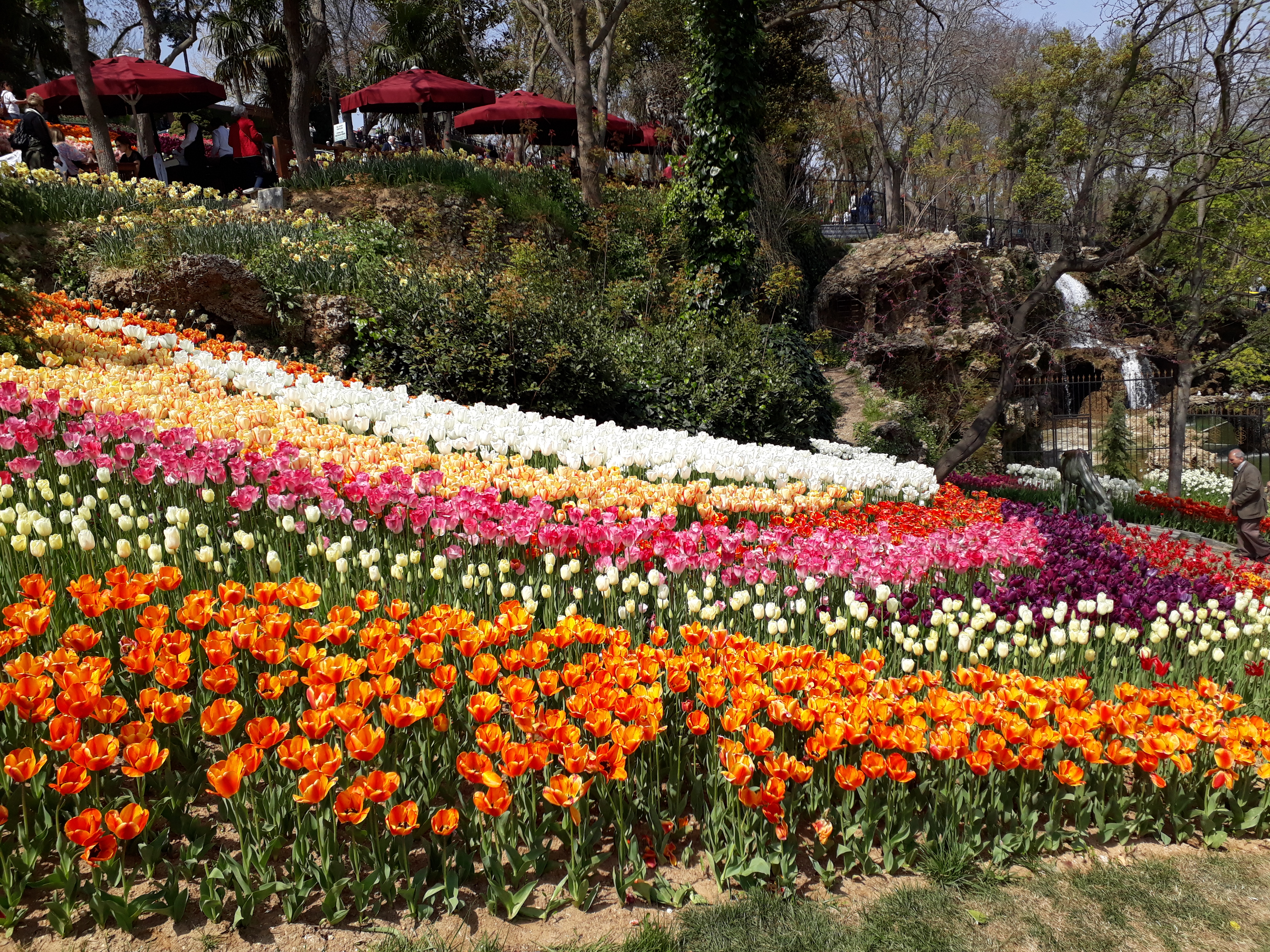
Tulip Festival at Emirgan Park

The park, owned and administered today by the Metropolitan Municipality of Istanbul, covers an area of 117 acres (470,000 m^{2}) on a hillside, and is enclosed by high walls.

Inside the park with two decorative ponds are plants of more than 120 species. The most notable rare trees in the park are stone pine, Turkish pine, Aleppo pine, blue pine, eastern white pine, maritime pine, Japanese cedar, Norway spruce, blue spruce, Atlas cedar, Lebanon cedar, Himalayan cedar, beech, ash tree, Sapindus, Babylon willow, Hungarian oak, Colorado white fir, maidenhair tree, California incense-cedar, coast redwood and camphor tree.

Many jogging tracks and picnic tables make Emirgan Park a very popular recreation area for local people, especially during weekends and holidays. The three historic pavilions, called after their exterior color as the Yellow Pavilion, the Pink Pavilion and the White Pavilion were restored between 1979 and 1983 by the Touring and Automobile Club of Turkey under its CEO Çelik Gülersoy, and opened to the public as cafeteria and restaurant.

=== Tulip Festival ===
Emirgan Park is closely associated with the tulip, the traditional flower, which gave its name to an era (1718-1730) of the Ottoman Empire. A special garden was established in Emirgan Park in the 1960s to revive the city's tradition of tulip cultivation. Since 2005, an annual international tulip festival is organized there every April making the park attractive and very colorful.

== Yellow Pavilion ==
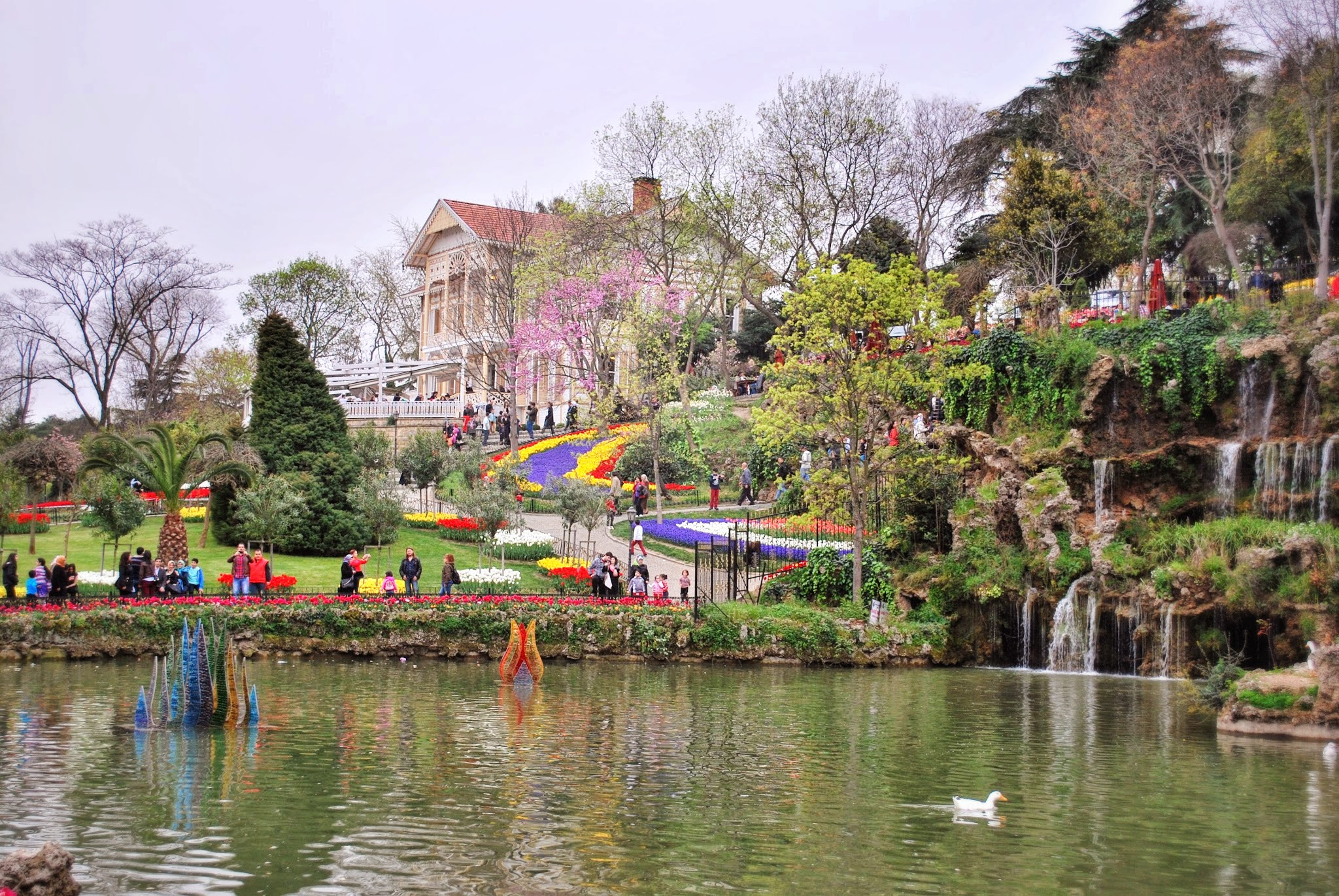
The Yellow Pavilion (Sarı Köşk) at Emirgan Park during the annual Tulip Festival in April

The Yellow Pavilion (Turkish: Sarı Köşk) is a large wooden mansion in the form of a chalet built by Khedive Ismail Pasha between 1871 and 1878 as a hunting lodge and guest house.

Situated in the center of the park and overlooking the Bosphorus, the two-storey mansion with one balcony, one terrace and a basement is constructed on an area of 400 m^{2} (4,300 ft^{2}). It consists of four rooms, one hall and a kitchen in the lower floor and three rooms and one salon in the upper floor. Its layout reflects the architecture of the traditional Ottoman house with a salon encircled by many living rooms. The ornaments at the ceilings and the walls were the work of the court architect Sarkis Balyan. The ceilings are enriched with oil painted flower figures and the facades with outstanding carvings. The high doors and windows, as well as the opulent interior decorations in bright colors, reflect the glory of that era. A pond is situated to the northeast, next to the mansion.

Used only by the owners from the very beginning, the pavilion was restored within four months in the beginning of the 1980s with due diligence, furnished with antiques and opened to the public as a cafeteria. The Yellow Pavilion, the main base of the park, is run since 1997 by Beltur, the tourism company of the Metropolitan Municipality of Istanbul. Up to 100 guests can be served there.

== Pink Pavilion ==
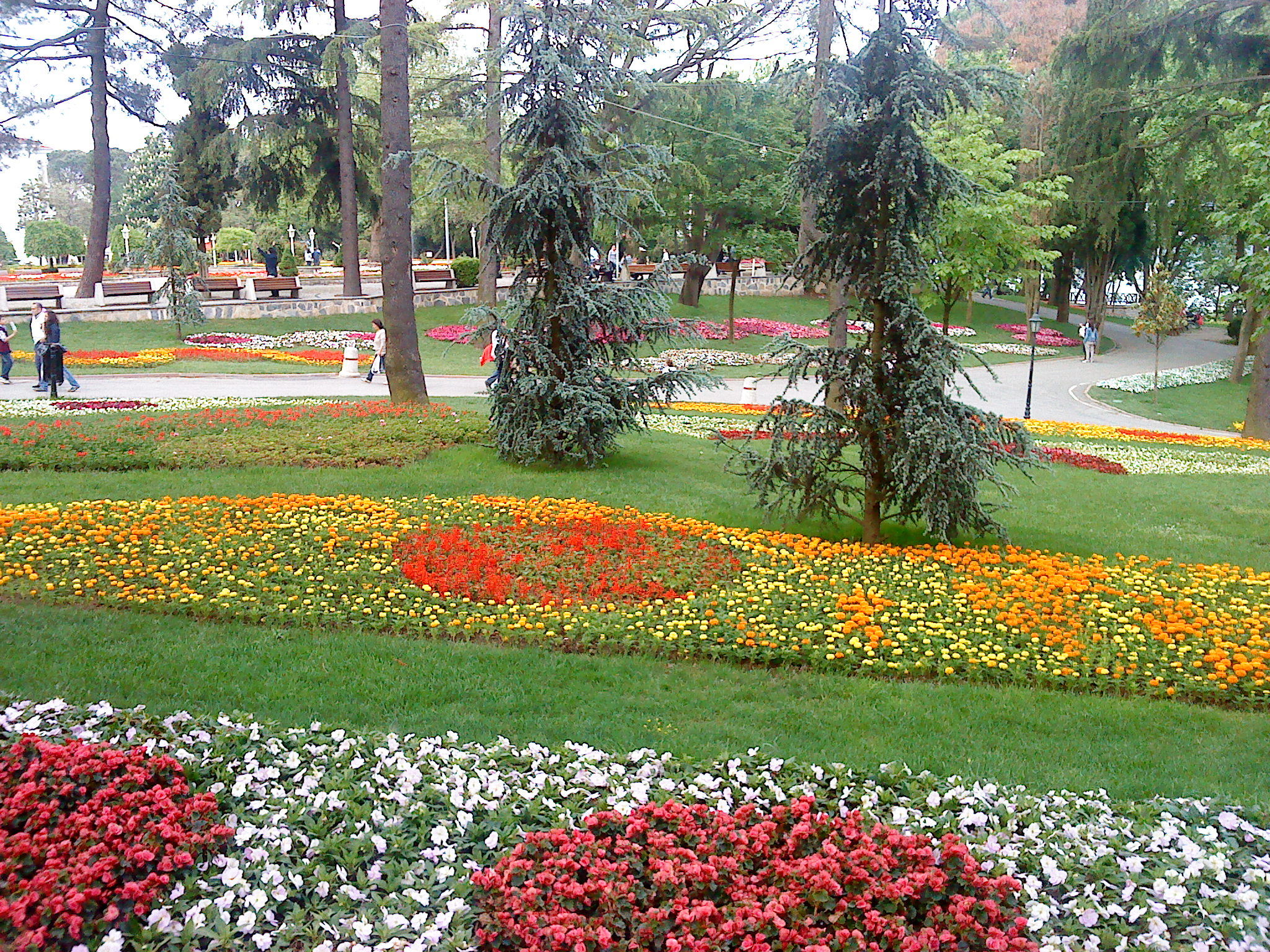
Another view of Emirgan Park

The Pink Pavilion (Turkish: Pembe Köşk), one of the three mansions in the park built by Khedive Ismail Pasha, is a two-storey, typical Ottoman house. Named after its exterior's original color of cranesbill flower pink, the pavilion reflects the glory of its history with fine ornaments.

The pavilion is used as a cafeteria on weekends. Furthermore, it is available for conventions and wedding ceremonies. In the summer months, it can accommodate up to 350 guests, for cocktails up to 500 people. In the winter, groups of up to 150 guests can be served.

== White Pavilion ==
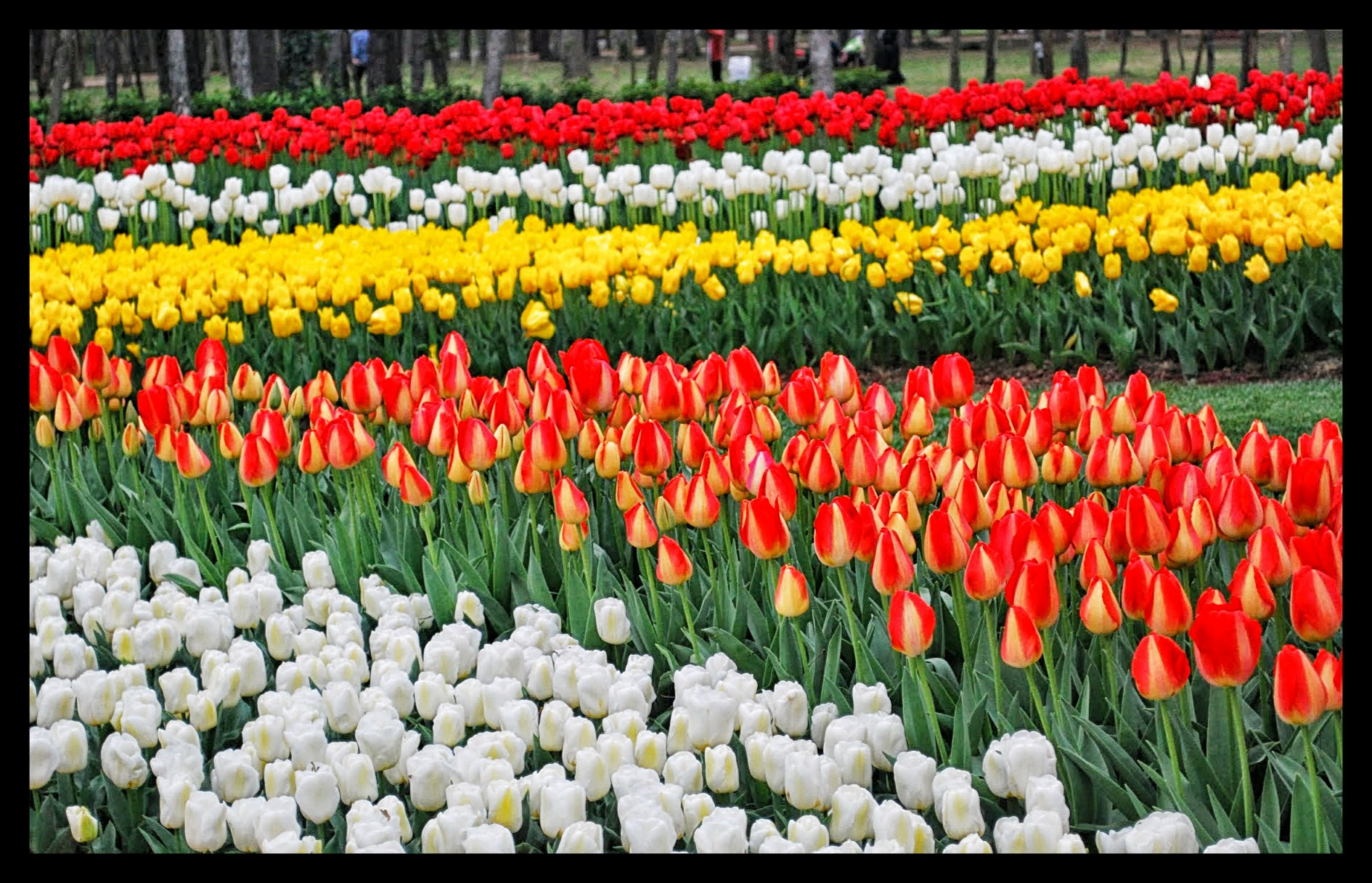
Tulip Festival at Emirgan Park

The White Pavilion (Turkish: Beyaz Köşk) is the third mansion within Emirgan Park built by Khedive Ismail Pasha. It is situated just 150 m (490 ft) from the Yellow Pavilion. The two-storey wooden building bears the architectural characteristics of the neo-classical style.

The mansion is used in the daytime as a cafeteria and in the evenings as a restaurant of Ottoman-Turkish cuisine.

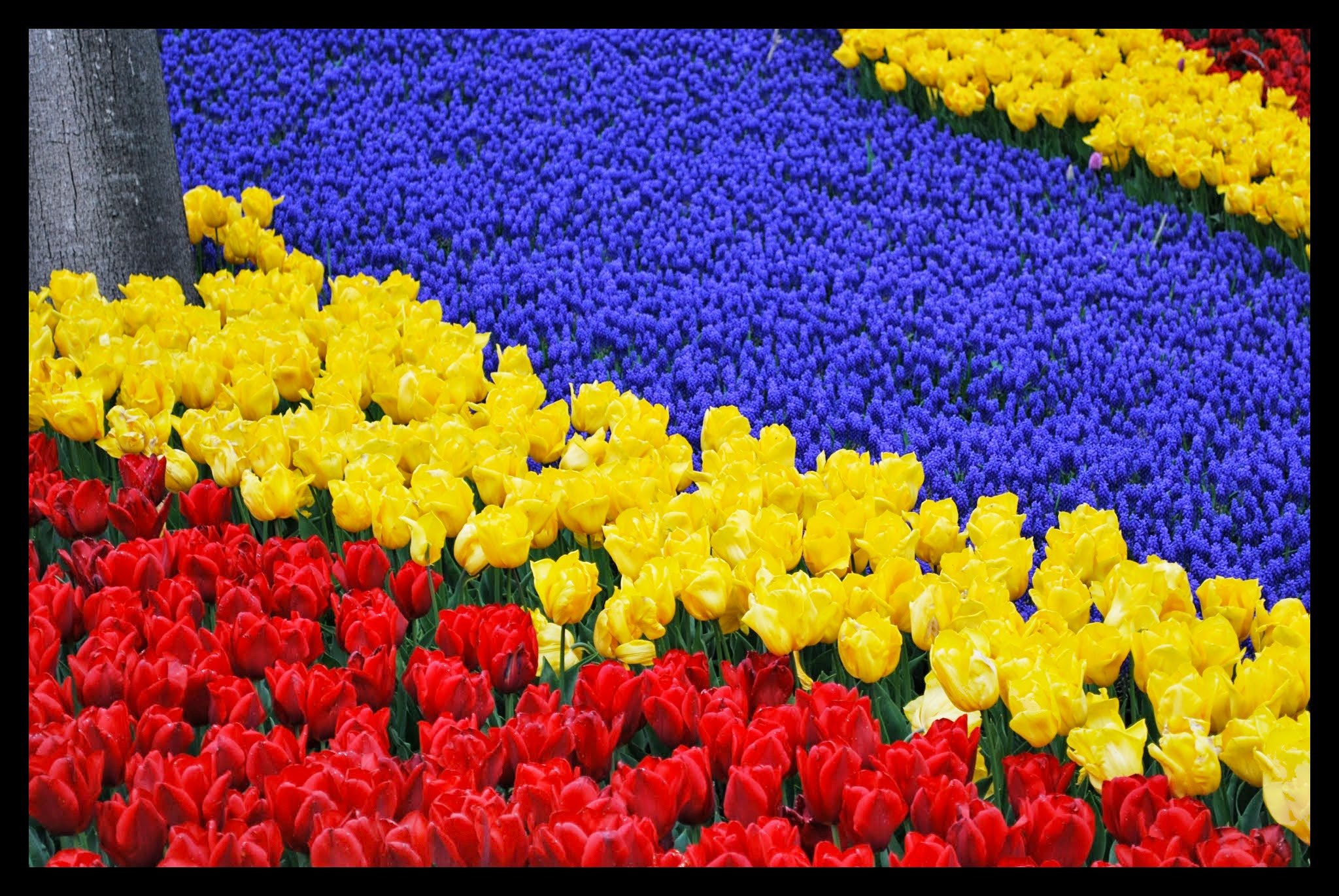
Tulip Festival at Emirgan Park

== See also ==
- Mihrabat Nature Park
