= Malta Kiosk =

Historic imperial Ottoman residence in Istanbul, Turkey

Coordinates: 41°03′04.68″N 29°00′57.24″E

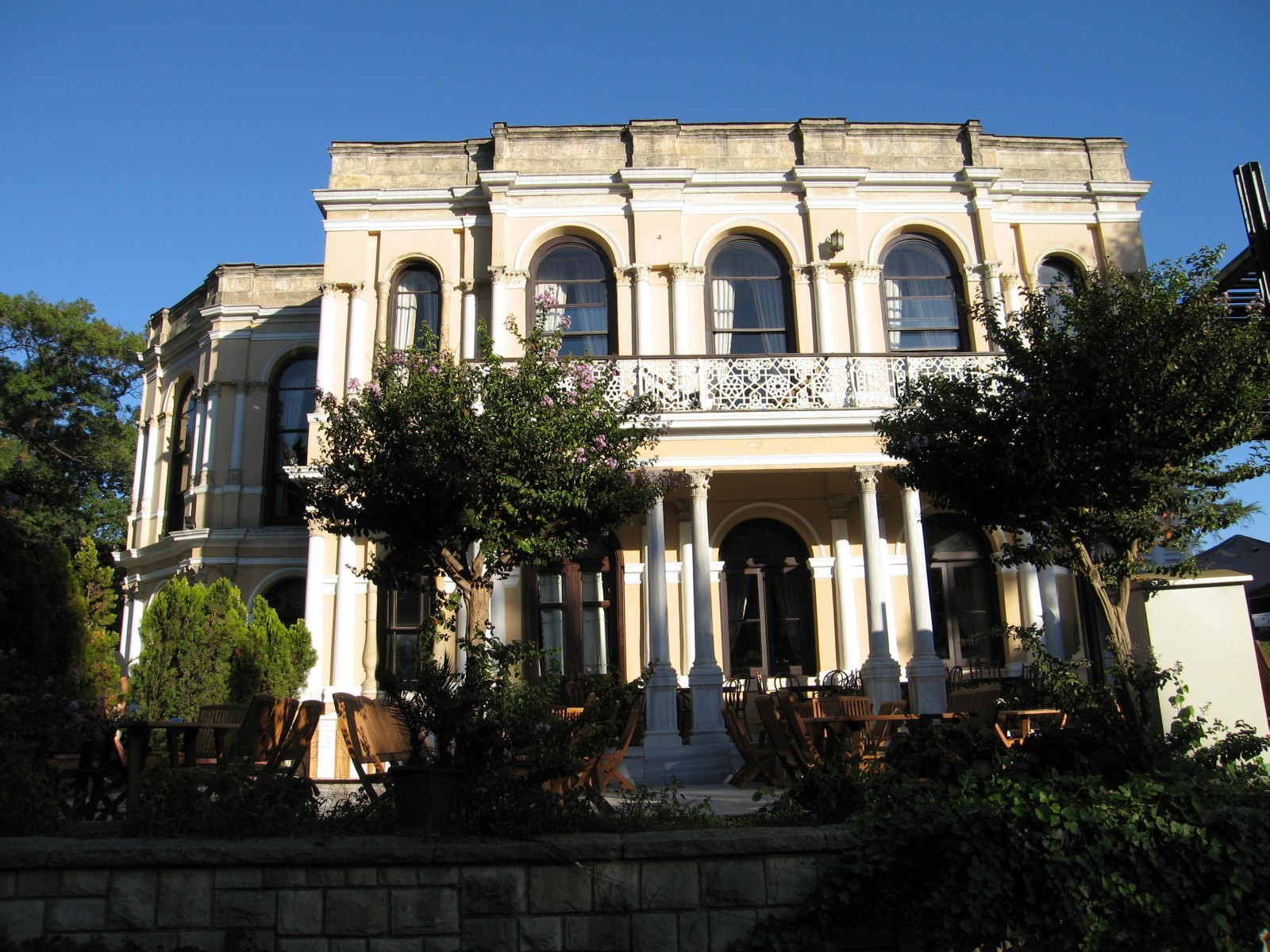
Malta Kiosk

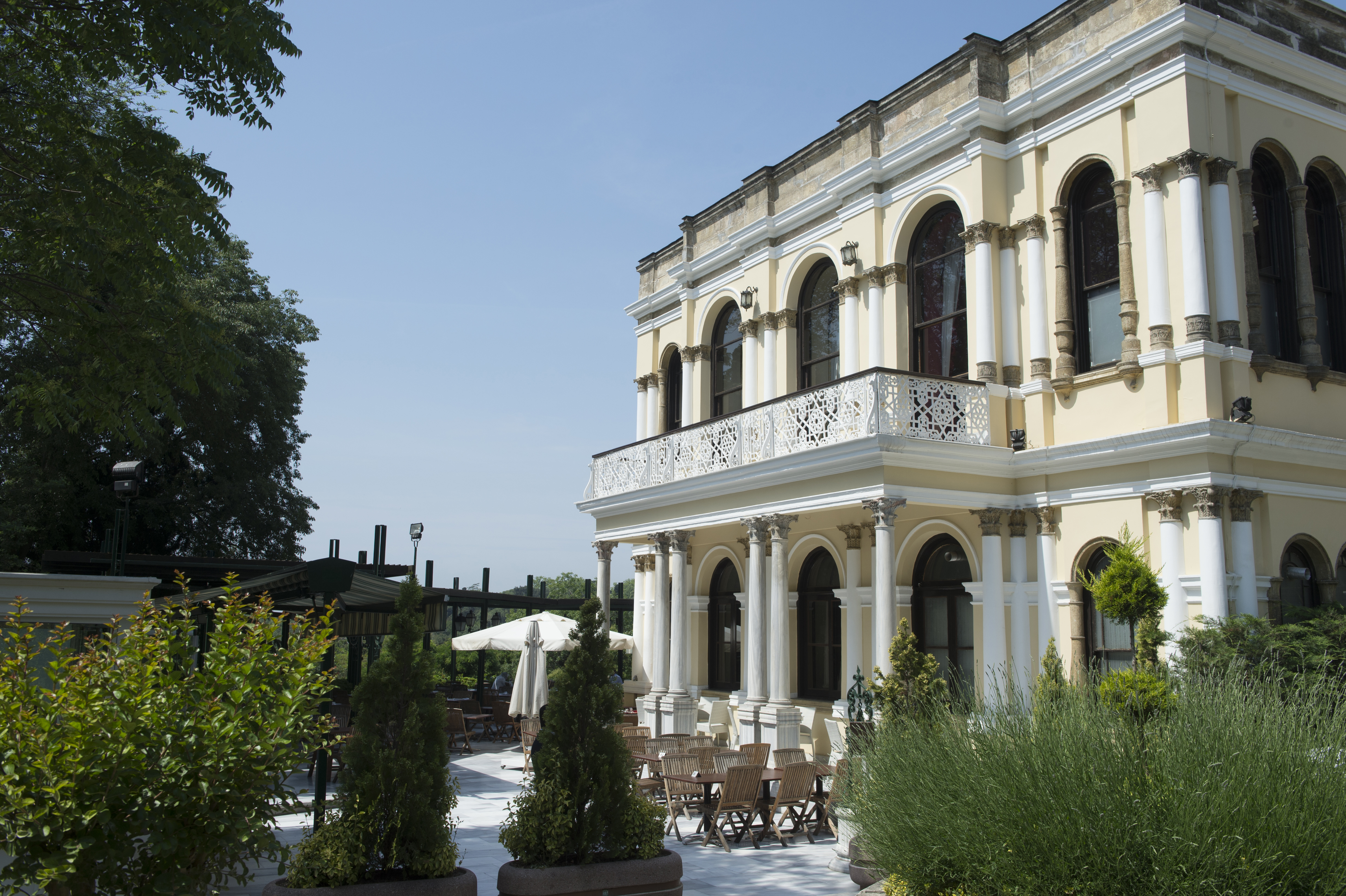
View of the mansion and the square from the front

The Malta Kiosk (Turkish: Malta Köşkü), also known as the Malta Pavilion, is a historic imperial Ottoman residence located within the garden of the Yıldız Palace in Istanbul, Turkey. The two-storey pavilion was commissioned by Sultan Abdülaziz (reigned 1861–1876) as a hunting lodge, designed by the architect Sarkis Balyan in the neo-baroque style and completed in 1870.

The pavilion, perched atop a steep hill, is one of the two lodges of its art within the Yıldız Park, the other one being the Çadır Pavilion (Turkish: Çadır Köşkü). It is located at the north side of the wall separating Yıldız Palace. There are also two watching and resting pavilions in the grove being the rear garden of Çırağan Palace from the Abdül Aziz I period.

The origin of the name comes from the extensive use of limestone from Malta, which is the prominent material used.

== Architecture ==
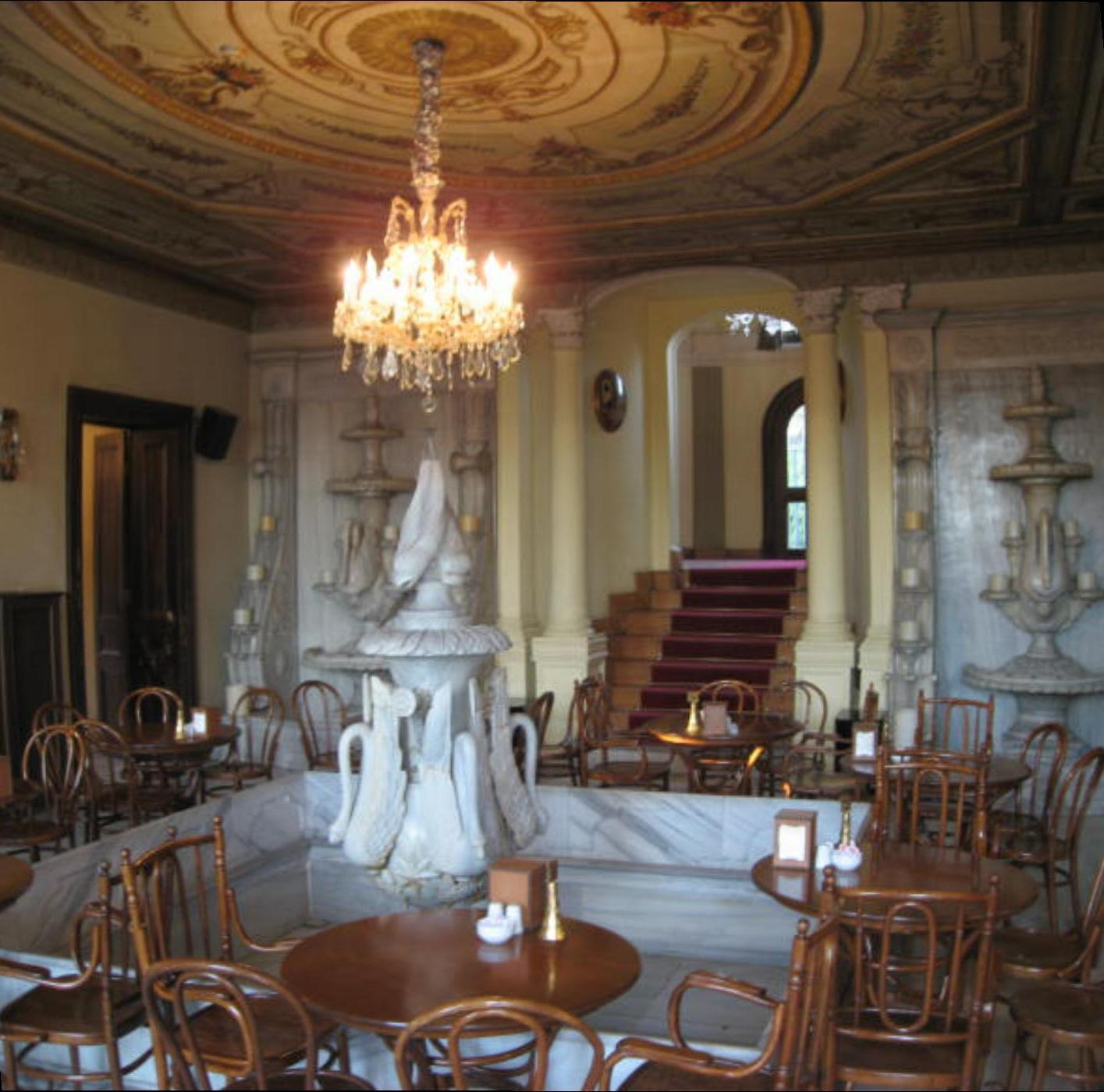
Marble fountain pool in the lower salon adorned with carved swan and fish figures.

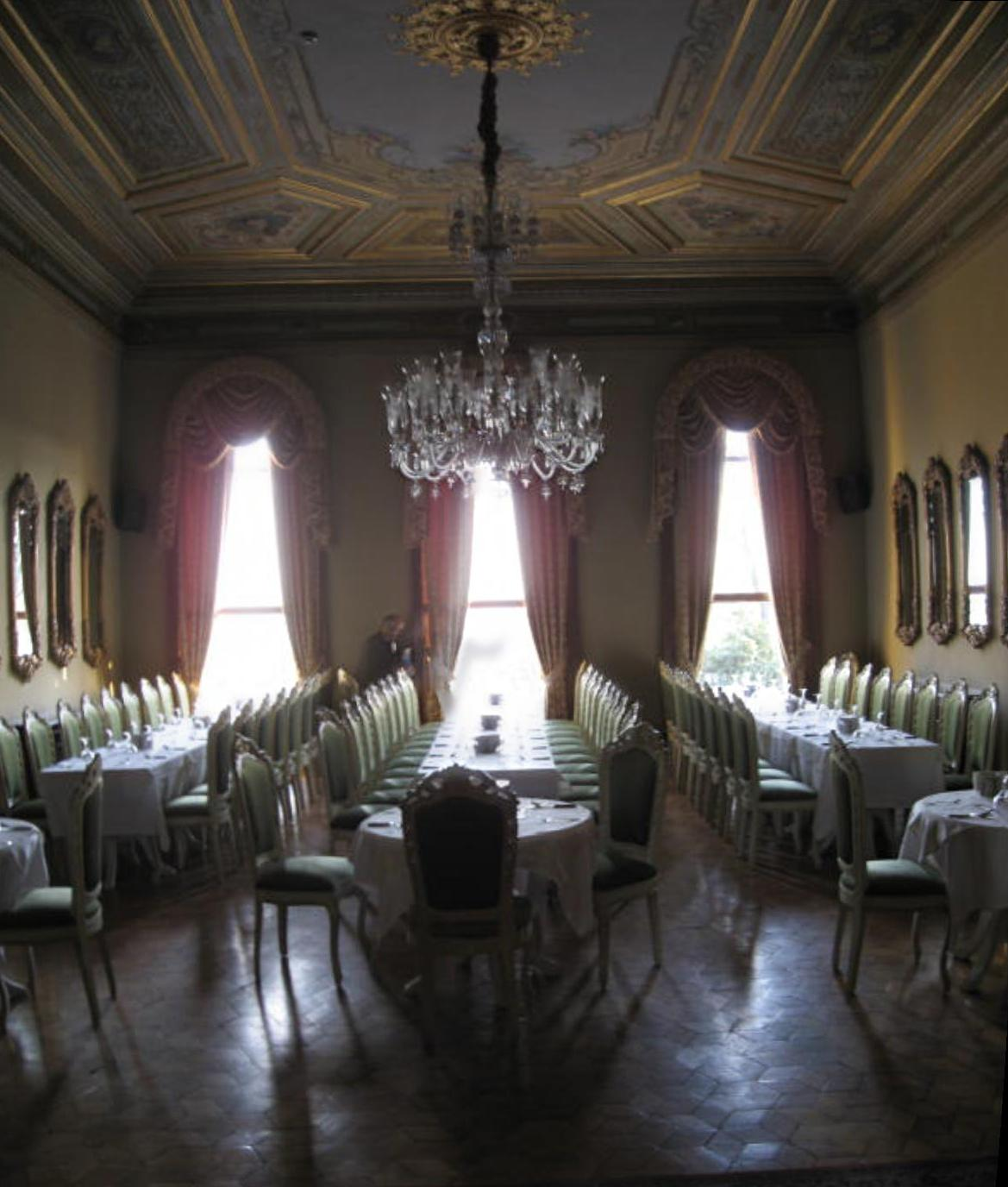
One of the salons on the second floor

Malta Kiosk is an example of westernised architecture of the 19th century. The building was constructed by Sarkis Balyan and his brothers. During the Abdül Mecid I period, the architects have been influenced by the European architecture and motifs of nature, flowers, fruits and hunting animal figures have been widely used on the walls. Round marble columns, terraces, bedrooms, wooden and crystal halls have features like neo-classical, neo-Islamic and neo-Ottoman characteristics. The arches in S and C shapes originated from the Rococo style. Columns, palmets or sea shells have been added to the keystones of the arches. The baroque style of the 19th century has been reflected with oval windows, fluted cornices, flushed columns with small tower on ends. The vertical and horizontal elements have been balanced in the Empire style symbolising the Napoleonic period under the influence of Egyptian and Roman architecture.

The facades of the building on each side, painted in yellow and green, consists of three parts with a large center section flanked by two smaller. Main elements of the facades are triple, tall but narrow, round-arched windows. At the second floor on the side overlooking the Bosporus are also balconies. The building has four doors in total.

The waterside entrance opens onto a large hall. On both sides of the entrance hall, two staircases rise to upper floor. A large chandelier hangs from a dome-shaped ceiling, which is opulently decorated with curving branches and clusters of various flower motifs. The lower salon contains a big marble fountain and a marble pool in the center decorated with carved swan and fish figures. Between the hall and the salon, there are five-tier marble fountains again with carved swan figures. Two marble columns erects here to the ceiling.

The salon on the upper level is flanked with two large and one small-sized rooms. The large salons on both floors are equipped with a carved marble fireplace worked with colorful flowers. Oil paintings with landscape themes beautify the walls of the salons. Two rooms on the upper floor are decorated with flower motifs. There are balconies on the second floor facing the sea.

== Witness to political incidents ==
When Sultan Abdülaziz was dethroned in 1876, his nephew Murad V (reigned May 30-August 31, 1876) was elevated to the throne. However, he was in turn deposed only after 93 days on the grounds that he was mentally ill, and was replaced by his brother, Abdul Hamid II (reigned 1876–1909). Abdul Hamid II detained Murad V in the Malta Pavilion.

Midhat Pasha, grand vizier and statesman, was ordered by Sultan Abdul Hamid II to be arrested the second time in 1881. Although escaped in the first instance, Midhat Pasha returned a short time later claiming a fair hearing. The trial was held in the nearby Çadır Pavilion, and lasted three days in June that year, during which he was tortured in the basement. The trial of Midhat Pasha took place in a tent behind the pavilion.

== Redevelopment ==
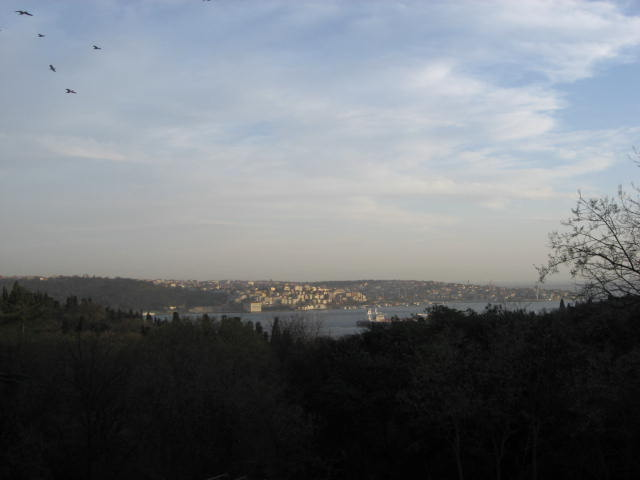
View onto the Bosphorus from the terrace at dawn

Following the foundation of the Republic of Turkey, the Malta Pavilion, as many of Ottoman imperial buildings, stood unused and was neglected over a long period. In 1979, the Touring and Automobile Club of Turkey (TTOK) under its CEO Çelik Gülersoy signed an agreement with the City of Istanbul to restore and preserve specific imperial residences, and to run them as public premises. Malta Pavilion was the first restoration work accomplished.

The exterior walls were repainted green with white trim, and the interiors were restored to their former glory. Furnishings, chandeliers and paintings were collected to fit the style of the rich neo-baroque building.

Opened to the public in 1982, the Malta Pavilion was run as a cafeteria and restaurant by the TTOK until the lease license expired, and the Metropolitan Municipality of Istanbul did not renew it. From 1997 until 2003, it was operated by the tourism company Beltur of the Metropolitan Municipality. Today, the premise is being run by a private company. In the restaurant and cafeteria on two floors, up to 150 guests can be served.

== Dessert ==
"Malta Köşkü" is also the name of a cake in the Turkish cuisine prepared with the loquat fruit (Turkish: Malta eriği).

== Literature ==
- Gülersoy, Çelik (1983). Yıldız Parc and Malta Pavilion. Istanbul: TTOK Yayınları.
