= Çelik Gülersoy =

Turkish historical preservationist (1930–2003)

Çelik Gülersoy (September 23, 1930 in Hakkâri – July 6, 2003 in Istanbul) was a Turkish lawyer, historical preservationist, writer and poet. He is best remembered for the heritage conservation works he carried out on historical sites during his long-time tenure as director general of the Touring and Automobile Club of Turkey (TTOK).

He was born to a Kurdish family in Hakkâri, Turkey's most southeastern city, where his father was working as a gendarmerie officer but the family moved to Istanbul in 1933. After completing his education in Istanbul, Gülersoy attended Istanbul University and graduated from its Law School. Following his military service in 1959–1960, he started work as a legal consultant to the TTOK in 1961, having already held several posts there since 1947.

In 1966, Gülersoy became director general of the TTOK, a position he held for 38 years until his death. During this time he reorganised the TTOK to bring in new and much-needed services. He published numerous books on historic sites, mainly in Istanbul, and contributed greatly to the redevelopment of such touristically important areas as Söğükçeşme Sokağı in Sultanahmet and the historic parks such as Emirgan and Yıldız.

Çelik Gülersoy died of pancreatic cancer on July 6, 2003 during a classical music concert at the Fabiato Köşkü (Mansion) on Büyükada. He was buried next to his mother's grave in Demirciköy Cemetery in Sarıyer following a funeral service in Teşvikiye Mosque. He left all his assets to the Çelik Gülersoy Foundation which still operates a library on Söğükçeşme Sokağı, behind Ayasofya.

== Notable historical preservations ==
- Chora Church environs (1977)
- Çamlıca Hill (1980)
- Malta and Çadır pavilions, Yıldız Park (1982)
- Yellow, Pink and White pavilions, Emirgan Park (1979-1983)
- Hotel Yeşil Ev, Sultanahmet (1984)
- Khedive Palace, Çubuklu (1984)
- Soğukçeşme Street, Sultanahmet (1985-1986)
- Kameriye, Feneryolu (1989)
- Fenerbahçe Park, Fenerbahçe (1990)

== Bibliography ==
- Mehterhane. The Military Band of the Turkish Army. Es Fanfares Des Anciennes Armees Turques, TTOK Yayınları, Istanbul
- A Guide To Istanbul, TTOK Yayınları, Istanbul (1978) 358 pp (English)
- Guide D'Istanbul, TTOK Yayınları, Istanbul (1978) 390 pp (Italian)
- Kapalı Çarşının Romanı, TTOK Yayınları, Istanbul (1979) 80 pp (also in French)
- Lâle ve İstanbul, TTOK Yayınları, Istanbul (1980)
- Eski İstanbul Arabaları, TTOK Yayınları, Istanbul, (1981) 135 pp
- Çamlıca'dan Bakışlar, TTOK Yayınları, Istanbul (1982)
- Ihlamur Mesiresi, TTOK Yayınları, Istanbul (1983)
- İstanbul Estetiği, TTOK Yayınları, Istanbul (1983)
- Yıldız Parkı ve Malta Köşkü, TTOK Yayınları, Istanbul (1983)
- Yıldız Parc and Malta Pavilion, TTOK Yayınları, Istanbul (1983) (English)
- Kayıklar, TTOK Yayınları, Istanbul (1983) 143 pp
- İstanbul'un Anıtsal Ağaçları, TTOK Yayınları, Istanbul (1983)
- Dolmabahçe/Çağlarboyu İstanbul Görünümle, TTOK Yayınları, Istanbul (1984)
- Edirnekapısı'nda Bir Örnek, TTOK Yayınları, Istanbul (1985)
- Hıdivler ve Çubuklu Kasrı, TTOK Yayınları, Istanbul (1985) 196 pp (also in English)
- Küçüksu, TTOK Yayınları, Istanbul (1985) (also in English)
- Reklamlar ve Biz, TTOK Yayınları, Istanbul (1985)
- Taksim: Bir Meydanın Hikayesi, TTOK Yayınları, Istanbul (1986) 143 pp
- İstanbul Şarkısı, TTOK Yayınları, Istanbul (1986)
- Batıya Doğru, TTOK Yayınları, Istanbul (1987) 165 pp
- Göksu'ya Ağıt, TTOK Yayınları, Istanbul (1987) 116 pp
- İstanbul Kitaplığı Katalogu 1988, TTOK Yayınları, Istanbul (1988) 526 pp
- Tramvay İstanbul'da, TTOK Yayınları, Istanbul (1989) ISBN 9757512079
- Kırk Yıl Olmuş, TTOK Yayınları, Istanbul (1989) 240 pp, ISBN 9757687014
- Dolmabahçe Palace and Its Environs, TTOK Yayınları, Istanbul (1990)
- Mavi Cami, TTOK Yayınları, Istanbul (1990) ISBN 9757512125
- Nasıl Bir İstanbul?, TTOK Yayınları, Istanbul (1990)
- The Caique, TTOK Yayınları, Istanbul (1991) 225 pp, ISBN 9757687049 (English)
- Taksim: The Story of A Square, TTOK Yayınları, Istanbul (1991) 143 pp, ISBN 9757687057 (English)
- Çerâğan Sarayları, TTOK Yayınları, Istanbul (1992) 205 pp, ISBN 978-975-7687-06-1
- The Çerâğân Palaces, TTOK Yayınları, Istanbul (1992) 208 pp, ISBN 978-975-7687-08-5 (English)
- The Khedives and The Çubuklu Summer Palace: Çubuklu Kasrı, TTOK Yayınları, Istanbul (1993) 236 pp, ISBN 9757641197 (English)
- Tepebaşı: Bir Meydan Savaşı, TTOK Yayınları, Istanbul (1993)
- Ayrılış (Şiirler), TTOK Yayınları, Istanbul (1996) 34 pp, ISBN 9757512192
- Büyük Çamlıca Tepesi 1908-1995, TTOK Yayınları, Istanbul (1996) 33 pp
- Safranbolu, TTOK Yayınları, Istanbul (1997) ISBN 9757641286 (also in English)
- Büyükada Dün/Yesterday, TTOK Yayınları, Istanbul (1997) 110 pp, ISBN 9757512206 (also in English)
- Hüzün Yağmuru (Şiirler), TTOK Yayınları, Istanbul (1997) 32 pp, ISBN 9757512214
- Fenerbahçe'si, TTOK Yayınları, Istanbul (1998) 62 pp
- Yeşil Ev. Bir Yuva, TTOK Yayınları, Istanbul (1999) 71 pp, ISBN 9757641294
- Yeşil Ev. A Home, TTOK Yayınları, Istanbul (1999) 71 pp, ISBN 9757641294 (English)
- Cumhuriyet'in Devraldığı İstanbul'dan Bugüne: Istanbul, from the birth of the Republic to the present day, the metamorphosis of a legacy, Sınai Kalkınma Bankası, Istanbul (1999)
- Beyoğlu'nun Yitip Gitmiş 3 Oteli, TTOK Yayınları, Istanbul (1999)
- Çankaya 57, TTOK Yayınları, Istanbul (2001) 32 pp, ISBN 9757512249
- Büyükada Yetimhanesi, TTOK Yayınları, Istanbul (2001) 36 pp, ISBN 9757512257
- A. Şinasi Hisar, TTOK Yayınları, Istanbul (2001) 34 pp, ISBN 9757512273
- Soğukçeşme Sokağı, TTOK Yayınları, Istanbul (2001) 80 pp, ISBN 9757512281
- Atatürk Atatürk, TTOK Yayınları, Istanbul (2001) 76 pp, ISBN 9757512303
- Soğukçeşme Street, TTOK Yayınları, Istanbul (2002) 80 pp, ISBN 9757641375.
- Atatürk Albümü, TTOK Yayınları, Istanbul (2002) 40 pp, ISBN 9757641405
- Beyoğlu'nda Gezerken, TTOK Yayınları, Istanbul (2003) 175 pp, ISBN 9757512281
- Bir Masal, TTOK Yayınları, Istanbul (2003) 40 pp, ISBN 9757512338
- Pierre Loti ve Dersaadet, TTOK Yayınları, Istanbul (2003) 19 pp
- Pierre Loti et Son İstanbul, TTOK Yayınları, Istanbul (2003) 19 pp (French)
- Kariye (Chora), Turing (also in English, French, German and Italian)
- Çelik Gülersoy Albümü, İstanbul Kitaplığı
- Beşiktaş Daha Dün, İstanbul Kitaplığı
- Bâb-ı Âli, with M. Nermi Haskan, İstanbul Kitaplığı
- Dolmabahçe Sarayı (English), İstanbul Kitaplığı
- Esentepe'ye Veda, İstanbul Kitaplığı
- İstanbul Rehberi (French), İstanbul Kitaplığı
- Hükümet Kapısı Bab-ı Ali Kuruluşundan Cumhuriyete Kadar, with Mehmet Nermi Haskan, İstanbul Kitaplığı
- İstanbul Maceramız, Remzi Kitabevi
- İstanbul Maceramız II, Remzi Kitabevi

== Recognitions ==
- 1976 - Cavaliere di Gran Croce Ordine al Merito della Repubblica Italiana
- 1979 - Ordre national du Mérite of France
- 1980 - "Plaque of Honor" by the Ministry of Culture and Tourism of Turkey
- 1986 - Honorary Doctor of the Black Sea Technical University, Trabzon
- 1986 - Honorary Doctor of the Boğaziçi University, Istanbul
- 1998 - Honorary Doctor of the Anadolu University, Eskişehir
- 2000 - "Grand Award of Culture and Arts" by the Ministry of Culture and Tourism of Turkey

== Biography ==
- İbrahimhakkıoğlu, Uğur. Çelik Gülersoy Senfonisi, İstanbul Kitaplığı, 561 pp. ISBN 9789757512370
