= Hagia Sofia Mansions Istanbul, Curio Collection by Hilton =

Luxury hotel in Istanbul, Turkey

- Interactive map of the Hagia Sofia Mansions Istanbul, Curio Collection by Hilton area
- Hotel chain: Hilton Worldwide

General information
- Type: Hotel
- Classification: 5 stars
- Location: Sultanahmet, Sultanahmet, Kabasakal Cd. No:5, Fatih, 34122, Istanbul
- Coordinates: 41.006638°N 28.978977°E
- Opening: 18 November 2019
- Owner: Dorak Holding

Design and construction
- Architect: William B. Tabler

Other information
- Number of rooms: 78
- Number of restaurants: 2
- Number of bars: 1

Website
- Official Site

The Hagia Sofia Mansions Istanbul, Curio Collection by Hilton, previously known as Hotel Yeşil Ev, (literally: Hotel Green House) is a historic wooden mansion, located in the Sultanahmet neighborhood of Istanbul, Turkey, which is used as a hotel after restoration. The premises is run by the Dorak Holding.

== History ==
Towards to the end of the 19th century, the four-storey wooden mansion was built for Şükrü Bey, minister of the tobacco monopoly in the Ottoman government. After the death of the owner, the great house gradually fell into a state of neglect. In 1977, the mansion was purchased by the TTOK.

The old wooden building had to be demolished and rebuilt with the consent of the "Commission for Ancient Monuments", since it was so far beyond repair. The exterior of the house was remade as an exact replica, while the layout with nineteen rooms was carefully preserved.

The restoration works, initiated by Çelik Gülersoy, the CEO of the TTOK, accomplished by March 1984, and the unique building opened as a hotel named "Yeşil Ev" after its exterior color. Combining historical style with modern standards, it very quickly gained a worldwide reputation and was awarded in 1985 the medal for the year by "Europa Nostra".

The hotel has two locations with two front desks - Kabasakal Cd. No:5 and Soğuk Çeşme Sk. No:3. The facts mentioned above refer to the first one.

== Hotel ==
Situated between Hagia Sophia and the Blue Mosque, the hotel has an absolutely unrivaled location, and offers guests the warm and friendly atmosphere of an old Istanbul home.

The hotel is the first Curio (brand) branded property in Istanbul. It features the Cistern Spa with hamam, and 78 rooms, each with deep soaking baths and separate showers, spread among 17 mansions.

It has two restaurants and a Cafe/Bar overlooking the hotel garden.

== Notable guests ==
- President François Mitterrand of France (1981–1995) for his New Year's visit to Turkey in 1992 (second visit in the same year).
- Prince of Belgium (1960)
- Jean-Paul Gaultier, French fashion designer (1952)
- Rudolf Nureyev, Russian ballet dancer (1938–1993)
- Larry King, American television host (1933)
- Rachel Weisz, English film actress (1970)

1993)

- Colm Toibin, Irish novelist

== See also ==
- Hotels in Istanbul
- Sultanahmet Jail (Four Seasons Hotel at Sultanahmet)
- Soğukçeşme Street (Hagia Sophia Mansions)

== Sources ==
- Gülersoy, Çelik (1999). Yeşil Ev. A Home. Istanbul: TTOK Yayınları. p. 71. ISBN 975-7641-29-4.
