= Çamlıca Tower =

TV tower in İstanbul, Turkey

Coordinates: 41°00′59″N 29°03′56″E

Küçük Çamlıca TV & Radio Tower
- Küçük Çamlıca Televizyon Kulesi
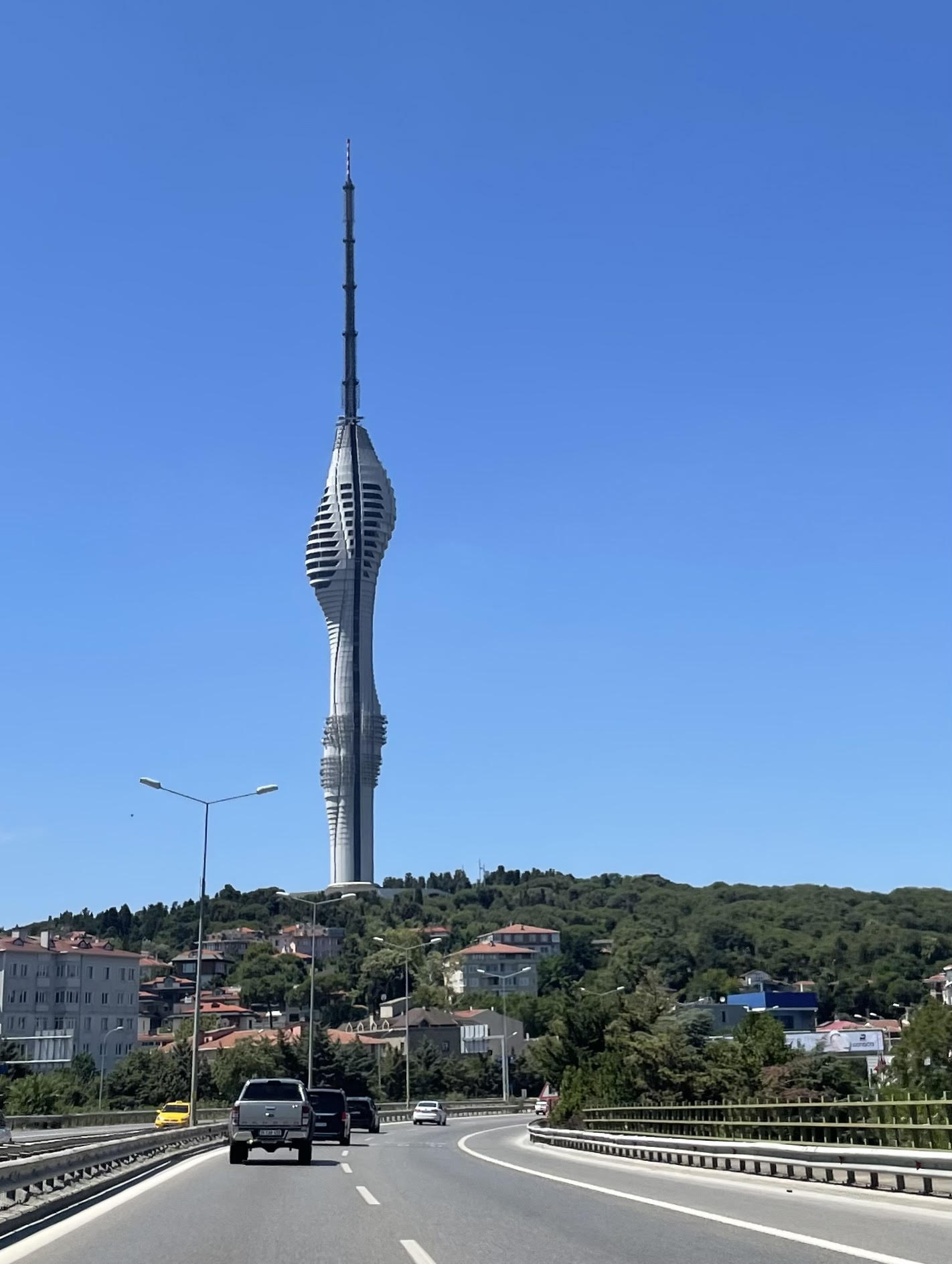
- Tower view from the highway
- Interactive map of the Küçük Çamlıca TV & Radio Tower area
- Alternative names: Çamlıca Tower

General information
- Status: Open to visitors
- Architectural style: Monolithic, iconic
- Location: Çamlıca Hill, Üsküdar, Istanbul, Turkey
- Elevation: 218 m (715 ft)
- Groundbreaking: October 2015
- Construction started: September 2016
- Completed: September 2020
- Inaugurated: May 29, 2021
- Cost: US$121.7 million
- Owner: Turkish Ministry of Transport and Infrastructure

Height
- Height: 369 m (1,211 ft)

Technical details
- Material: C 60 Class Concrete
- Size: 29,000 m^{2} (310,000 sq ft)
- Floor count: 49

Design and construction
- Architect: Melike Altınışık
- Architecture firm: Melike Altınışık Architects
- Structural engineer: Balkar
- Main contractor: Saridaglar Construction

Küçük Çamlıca TV & Radio Tower (Turkish: Küçük Çamlıca TV-Radyo Kulesi), or simply Çamlıca Tower, (Turkish pronunciation: [tʃamlɯdʒa]) is a telecommunications tower with observation decks and restaurants on Little Çamlıca Hill in Üsküdar district of Istanbul, Turkey.

The total height of the tower is 369 metres (1,211 ft), 221 metres (725 ft) of which is a 49-storey reinforced concrete structure with 18 metres (59 ft) below ground. The height of the tower's steel antenna is 168 metres (551 ft). With a total height of 587 metres (1,926 ft) above sea level, it carries the title of the highest structure in Istanbul.

The structure was chosen by then prime minister Recep Tayyip Erdoğan after the Çamlıca Hill TV & Radio Tower Idea Project, which was opened by Istanbul Metropolitan Municipality in 2011. Construction started in late 2016 and finished four years later in September 2020. However, the project was set to be completed by the end of 2019. It was inaugurated on May 29, 2021.

After the tower was put into service, other antennas and antenna towers such as Çamlıca TRT Television Tower were either removed or demolished.

== Architectural design ==
The tower is designed by Melike Altınışık Architects (MAA) firm, founded by Melike Altınışık after she left Zaha Hadid Architects. The building itself is a single piece structure, which was inspired by the Tulip flower; a symbol for the Turks during the Ottoman period. The main axis of the tower includes the roots and feeder stem of the tulip. The viewing terrace and restaurant floors resemble a tulip bud that hasn't bloomed yet.

Panoramic elevators rising from the ground floor to the top floor, are located on both sides of the main building. These elevators symbolize the Bosphorus, which both separates and integrates the Asian and European continents.

== General contractor ==
The construction project was awarded to Saridaglar Construction following a public bidding procedure by the Turkish Ministry of Transport and Infrastructure.

Saridaglar's scope included:

- Civil Works
- Construction Works
- Architectural Works
- MEP Works
- Landscaping Works.

This was one of the rare fast-track projects in Turkey. Due to the fast-track nature of the contract and complexity of construction methodologies, the project was subject to budget and schedule alterations.

== Structure specifications ==
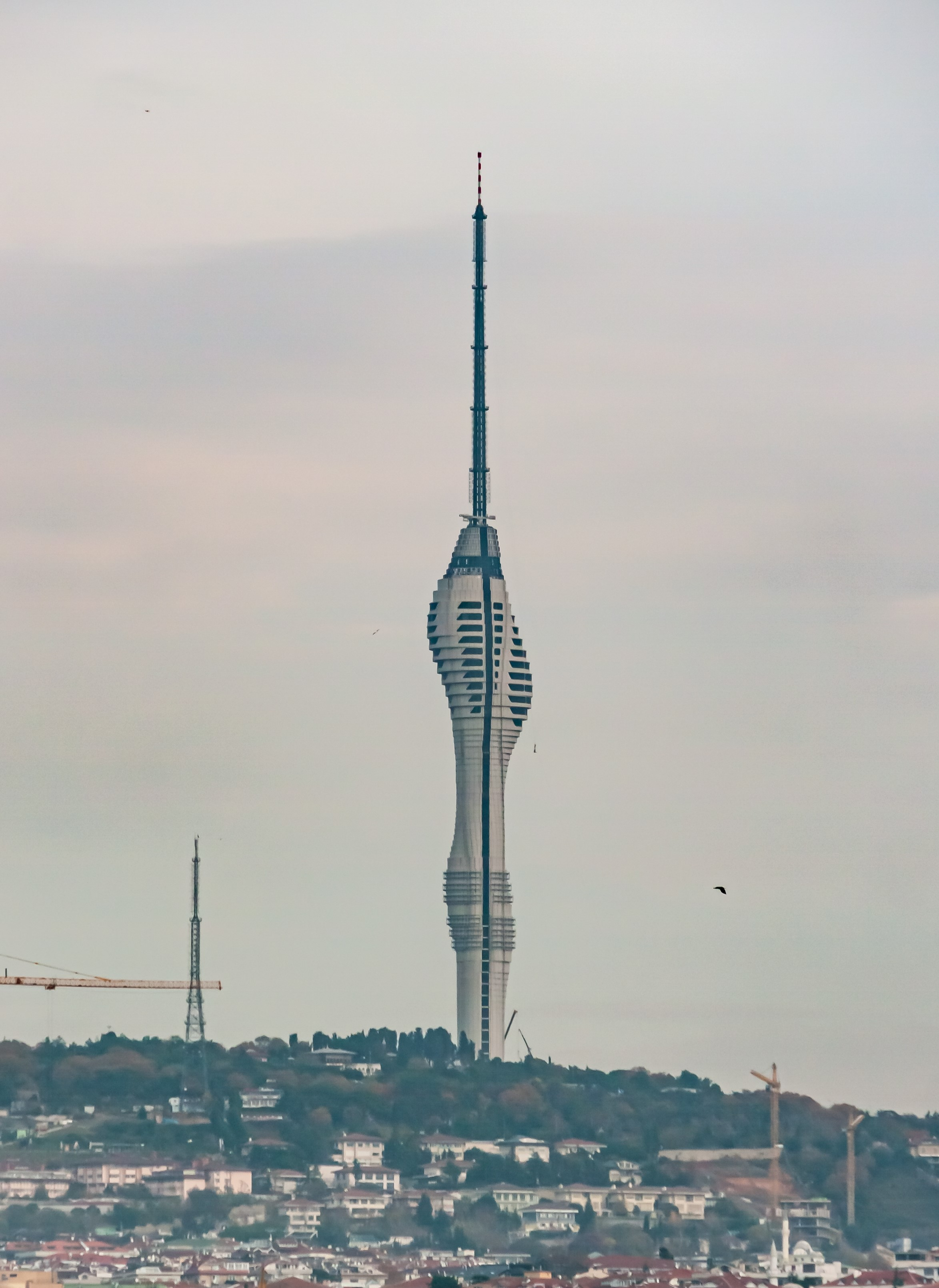
Çamlıca Tower is the tallest structure in Istanbul

The tower is built in concrete on a 18 m (59 ft) deep foundation. A steel mast of 168 m (551 ft) height for radio and television transmission is mounted atop the 203.5 m (668 ft) high concrete tower. The total height of the tower is 369 m (1,211 ft) with its top standing 587 m (1,926 ft) above main sea level. It is the highest structure in Istanbul.

Its cross section has elliptical form with the main axes of 13 and 16 m (43 and 52 ft), which becomes smaller upwards. Each tower floor is 4.50 m (14.8 ft) high. Two observation decks are situated on the 33rd and 34th floors at 366.5 and 371 m (1,202 and 1,217 ft) height from sea level. The 39th and 40th floors at 393.5 and 398 m (1,291 and 1,306 ft) height host a restaurant and a cafeteria. Libraries and exhibition halls are situated in the basement floors. A panoramic elevator and a service elevator serves the tower.

Çamlıca Tower is capable of hosting 100 high-quality broadcasting transmitters, without interfering with one another. It is the very first TV and radio tower in the world that can broadcast 100 channels at the same time.

=== Technical specifications ===
Ground level height	218 m
Each floor's height	4.5 m
Tower's total number of floors	45 above ground + 4 below ground = 49
Reinforced Concrete Structural Height	203.5 m above ground + 18 m below ground = 221.5 m
Steel Antenna Height	165.5 m + 2.5 m (embedded) = 168 m
Total Tower Height, Above Ground Level	203.5 m - 2.5 m + 168 m = 369 m
Total Tower Height, Above Sea Level	218 m + 369 m = 587 m
Total Structural Height	369 m + 18 m = 387 m
Observation Deck 1	148.5 m (366.5 m above sea level) - 33rd floor
Observation Deck 2	153 m (371 m above sea level) - 34th floor
Restaurant 1	175.5 m (393.5 m above sea level) - 39th floor
Restaurant 2	180 m (398 m above sea level) - 40th floor

== Project cost ==
In the first bid held on December 31, 2014, the cost of the project was announced as 73.1 million US Dollars. However, due to changing requirements of the building, three new bids were made, and the cost of the project was finalized at US$121.7 million (381.8 Million Turkish liras at the time).

== Gallery ==
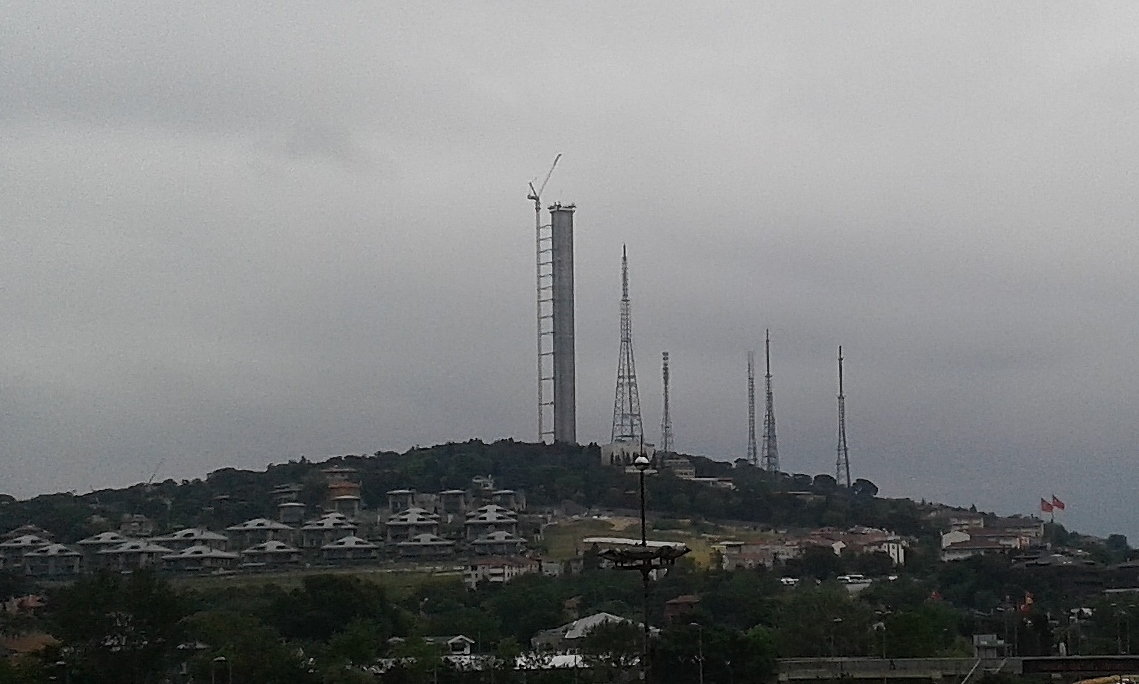
Küçük Çamlıca TV Radio Tower, construction in June 2017

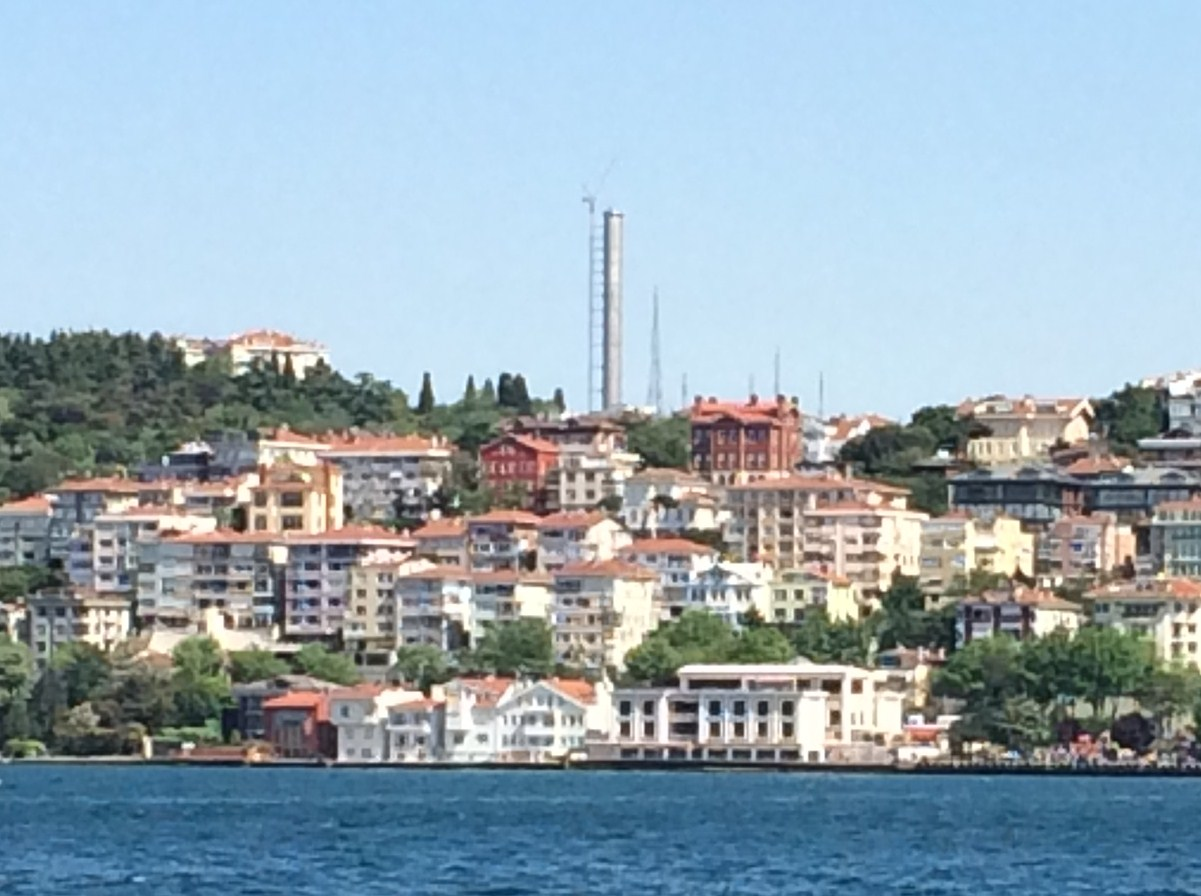
Küçük Çamlıca TV Radio Tower construction May 2017

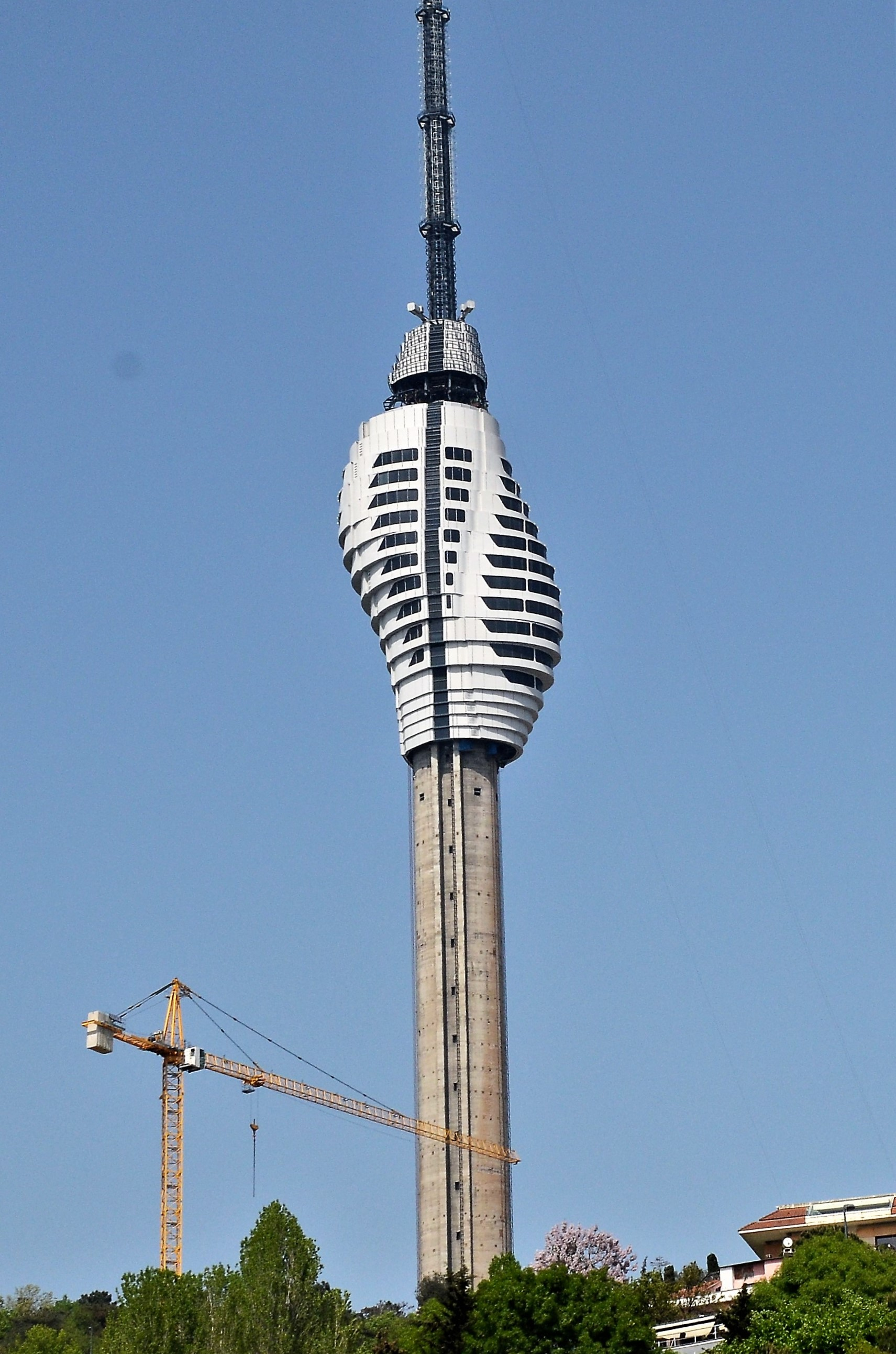
Küçük Çamlıca TV Radio Tower under construction (April 2019)

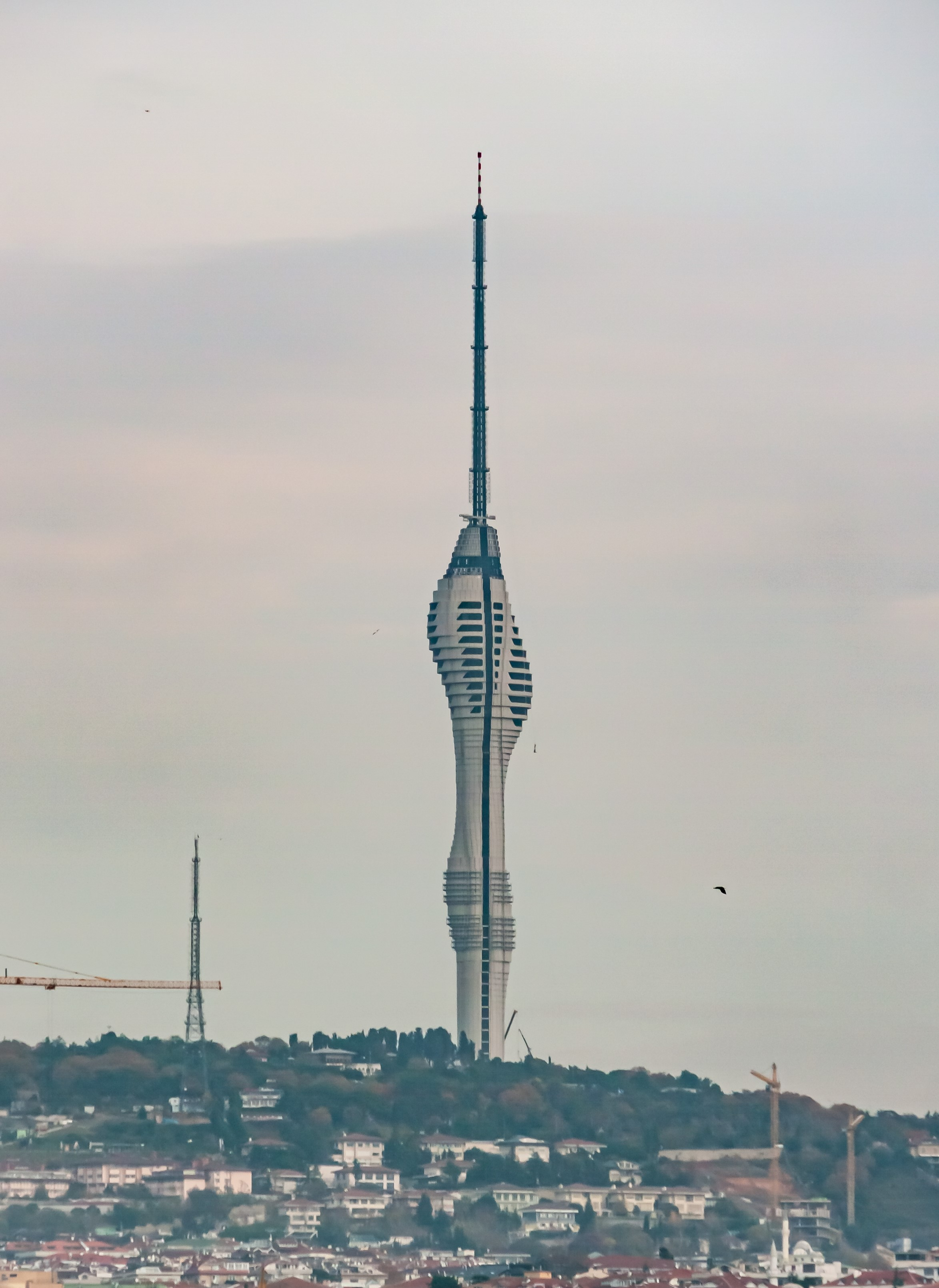
Tower under construction in 2019

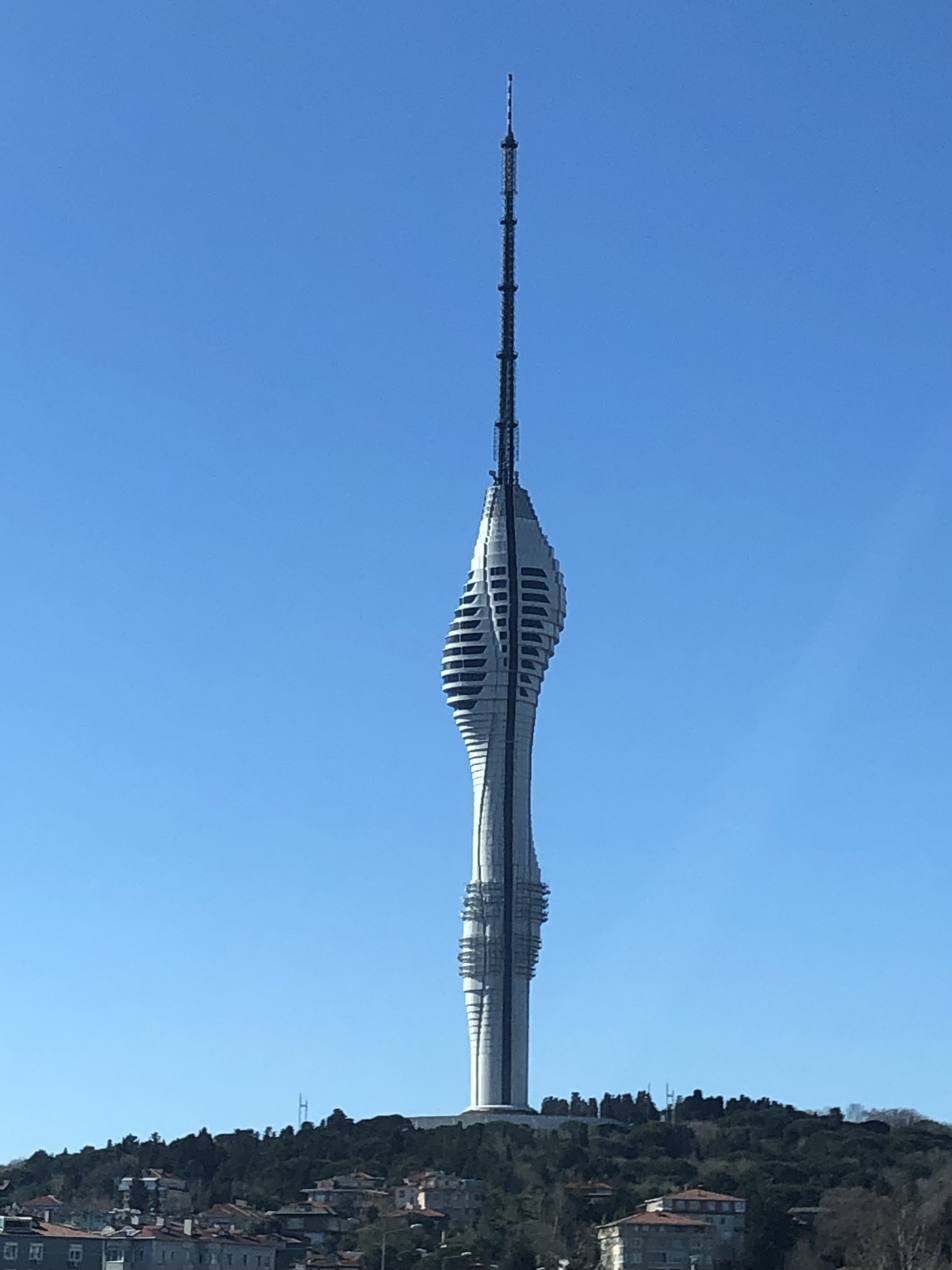
Tower upon completion of construction

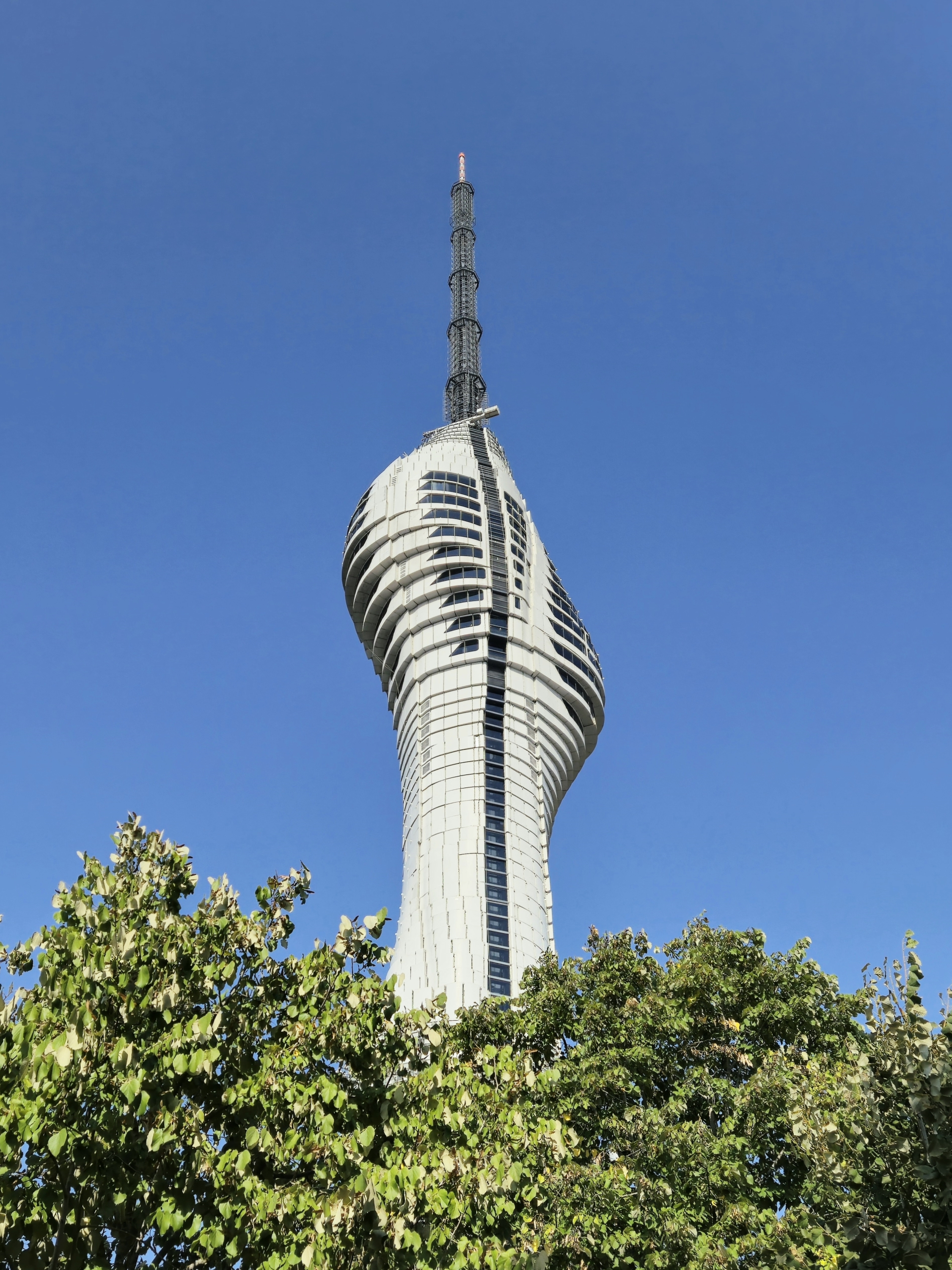
Çamlıca TV Radio Tower (2024)

== See also ==
- Çamlıca TRT Television Tower
- Endem TV Tower
