= Soğukçeşme Sokağı =

Street in Istanbul, Turkey

Coordinates: 41°0′33.48″N 28°58′48.72″E

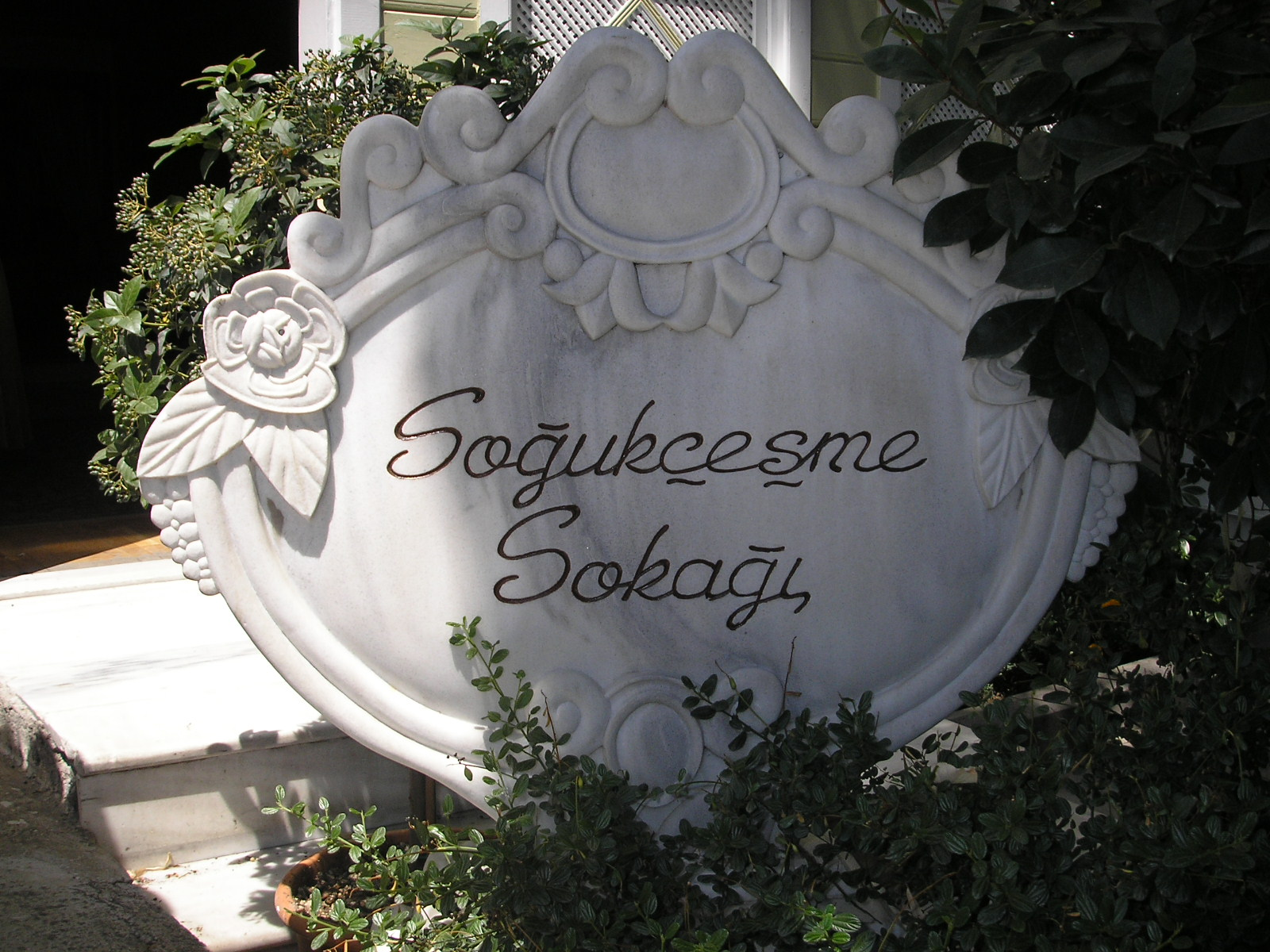
Marble street sign at the entrance of the street from the south

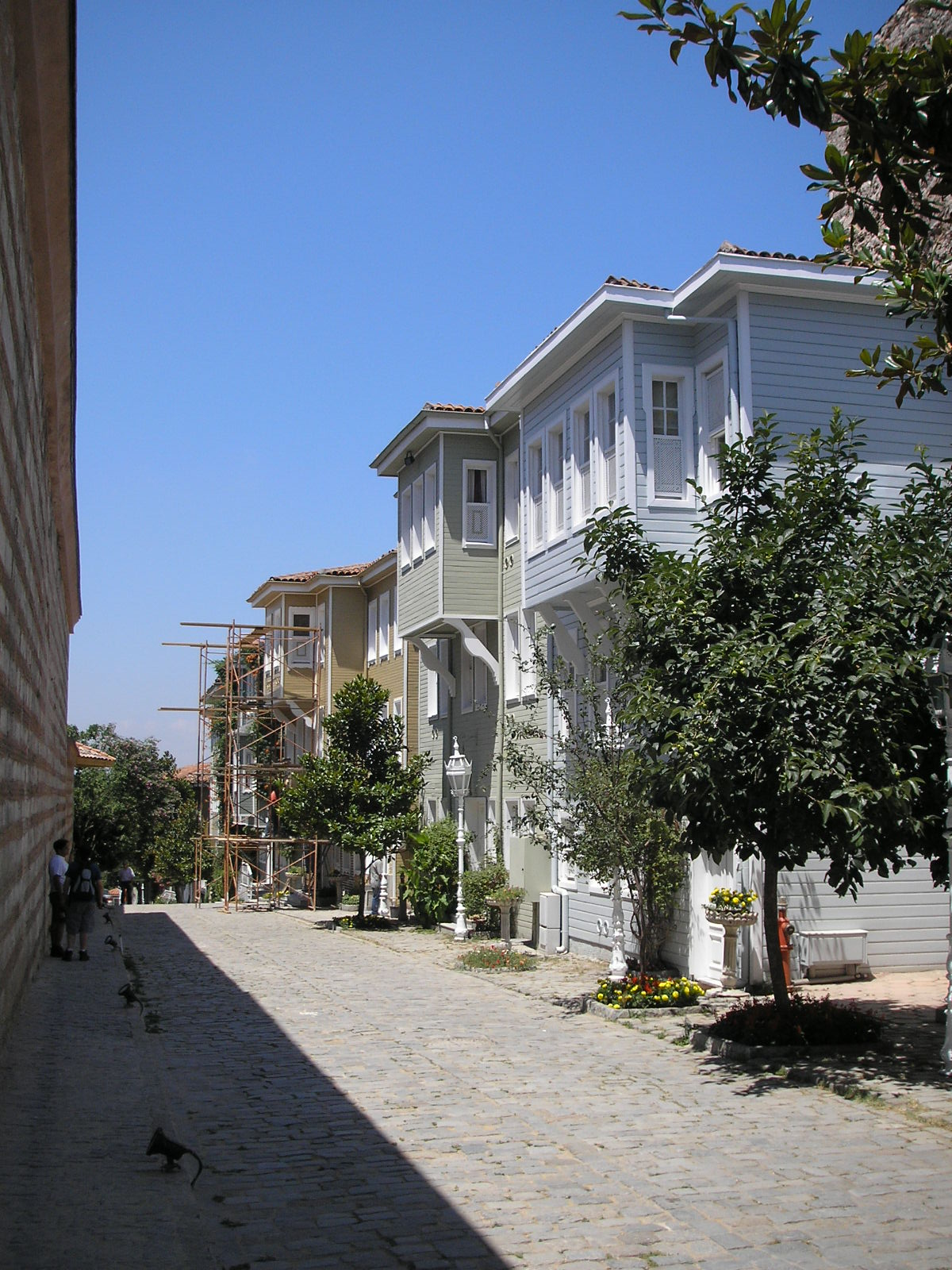
Soğukçeşme Sokağı with typical Ottoman houses of the late 19th century

Soğukçeşme Sokağı (literally: Street of the Cold Fountain) is a small street with historic houses in the Sultanahmet neighborhood of Istanbul, Turkey, sandwiched in-between the Hagia Sophia and Topkapı Palace. The car-free zone street is named after the fountain situated at its end towards Gülhane Park.

The originally wooden, two or three-storey Ottoman houses consisting of four to ten rooms date to the 19th to 20th century, and have been restored with the initiative of Çelik Gülersoy in 1985-1986. Instead of the original wooden structure, the houses are now made of reinforced concrete and veneered with wood to recreate the original appearance.

Called "Ayasofya Konakları" (Hagia Sophia Mansions), nine of the houses are part of the hotel Hagia Sofia Mansions Istanbul, Curio Collection by Hilton. The houses are named after the flower shrubs next to them as "Yaseminli Ev" (Jasmine House), "Mor Salkımlı Ev" (Wisteria sinensis House), "Hanımeli Ev" (Honeysuckle House) etc. The buildings are decorated in the 19th-century style with furniture including such items as beds and consoles, silk curtains, velvet armchairs and gilded mirrors. Most notable guest of the hostel was Queen Sofía of Spain, who stayed in the spring of 2000 for four nights.

The birthplace of Turkey's 6th president Fahri Korutürk (1903–1987) is also situated in this street. One of the houses hosts the library "İstanbul Kitaplığı" with over 10,000 books about Istanbul owned by the Çelik Gülersoy Foundation.

On one end of the street towards Gülhane Park is a Byzantine cistern, which houses the "Sarnıç Restaurant" today.

== Sources ==
- Gülersoy, Çelik (2002). Soğukçeşme Street. Istanbul: TTOK Yayınları. p. 80. ISBN 975-7641-37-5.
