= Çamlıca TRT Television Tower =

Çamlıca TRT Television Tower TRT Çamlıca Verici İstasyonu
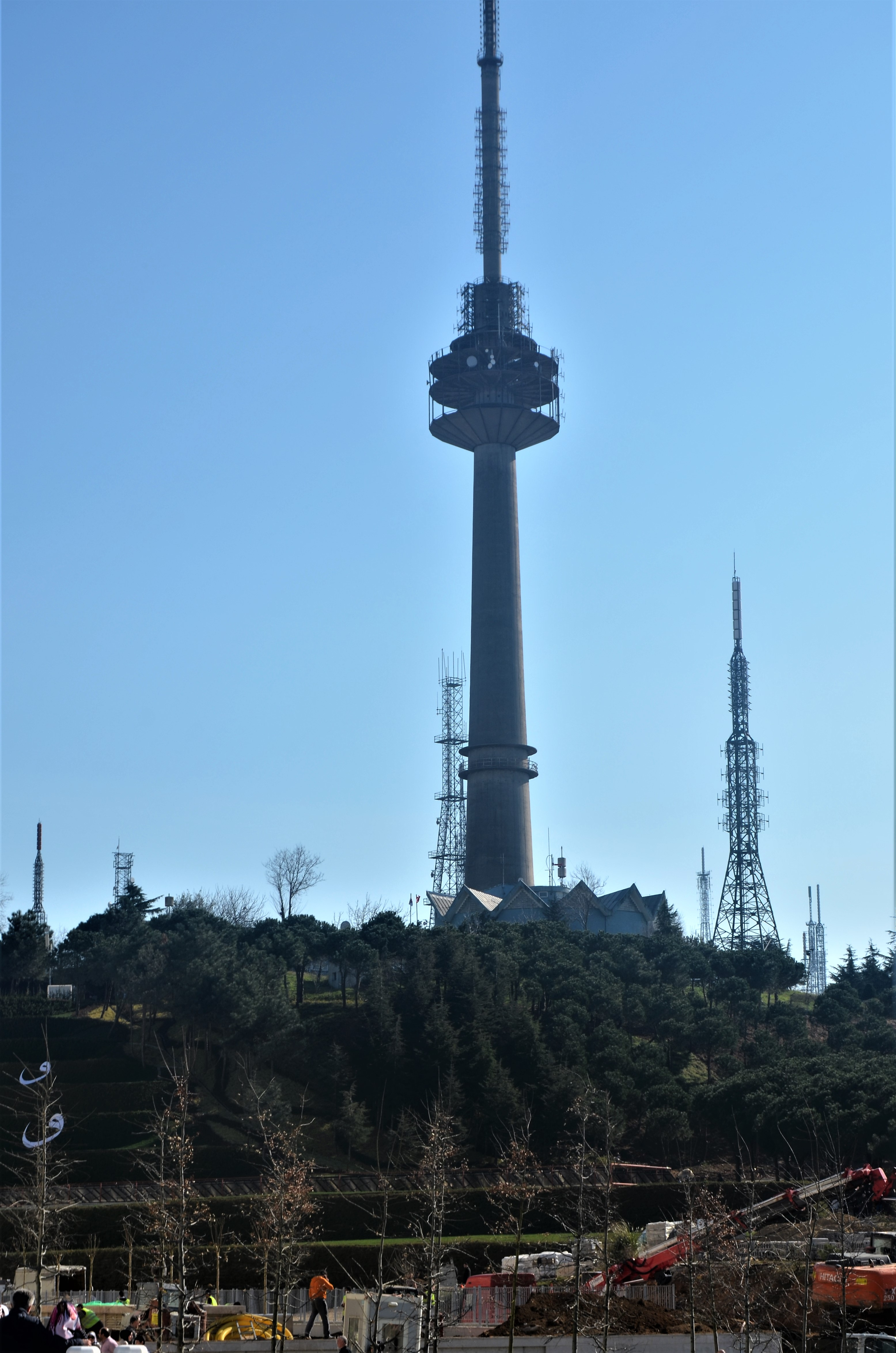
- Television tower of the Turkish Radio and Television Corporation (TRT) at Çamlıca Hill in Üsküdar, Istanbul.

- Location within Istanbul
- Location: Çamlıca Hill, Üsküdar, Istanbul, Turkey
- Mast height: 18 m (59 ft)
- Tower height: 166 m (545 ft)
- Coordinates: 41°01′55″N 29°04′09″E
- Built: 1972
- Demolished: 2020

Çamlıca TRT Television Tower (Turkish: TRT Çamlıca Verici İstasyonu) was a communications tower in the Üsküdar district of Istanbul, Turkey, which was owned and operated by the state-owned Turkish Radio and Television Corporation (TRT). It was demolished in late 2020 after 48 years in service.

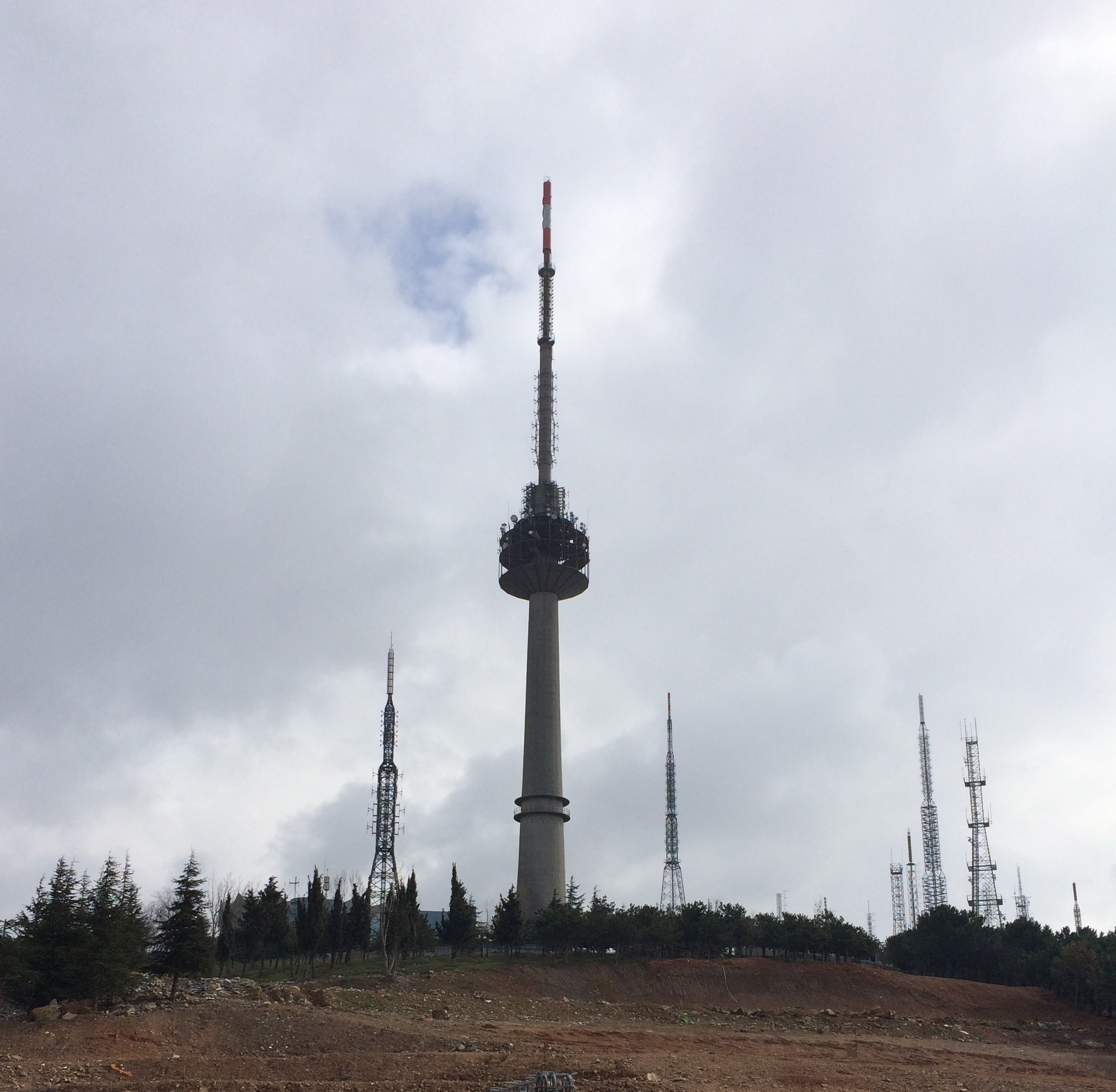
Çamlica TRT Television Tower seen on the hill

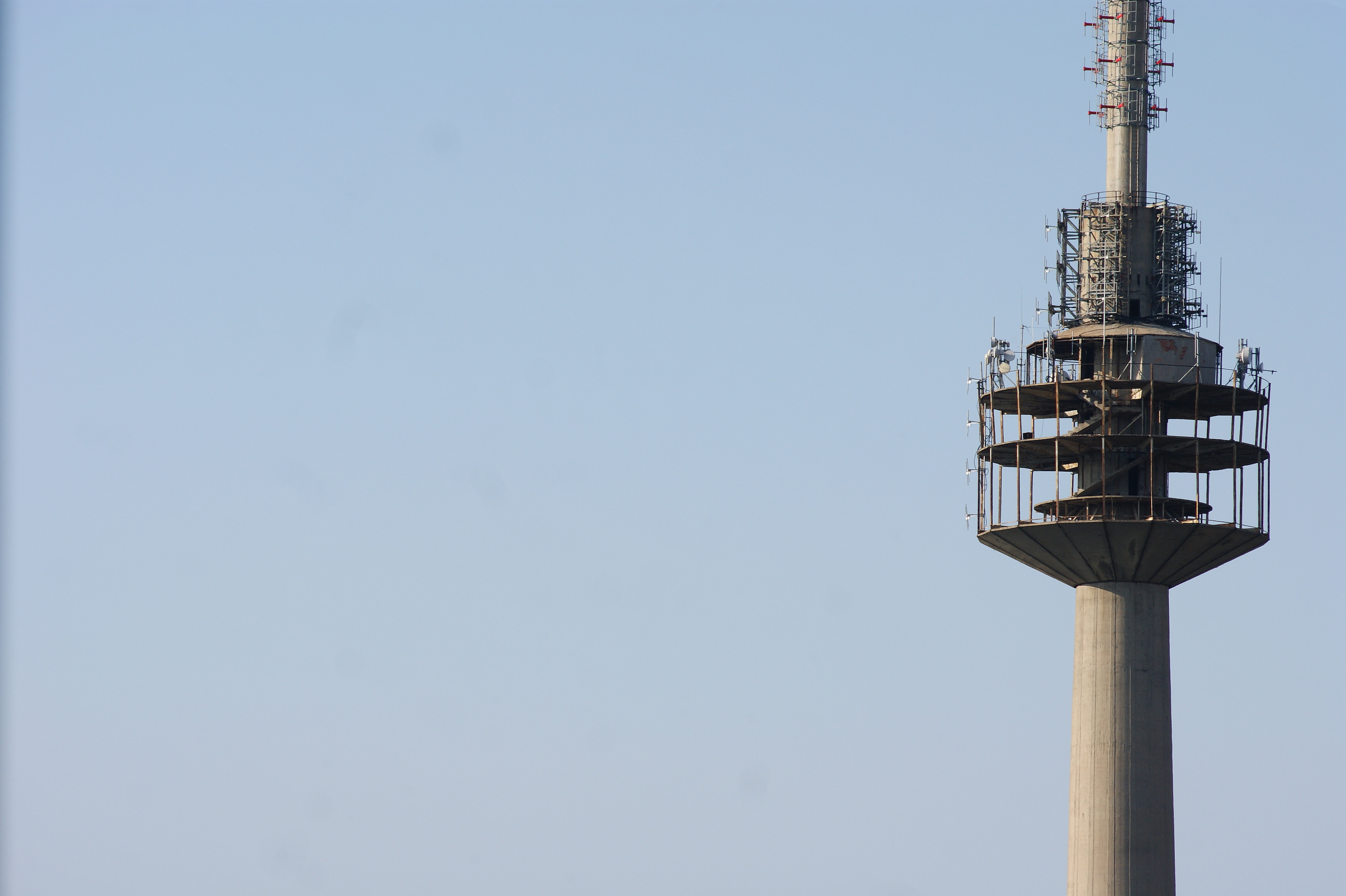
Tower Basket with antenna platforms

== History ==
The tower was located on Büyük Çamlıca Hill (literally:Big Çamlıca Hill) at 268 m (879 ft) above main sea level. The tower went into service on 30 December 1972. The tower had a total height of 166 m (545 ft) with the 148 m (486 ft) highconical concrete tower and a steel mast atop. On May 21, 2010, a fire broke out at the tower's 80 m (260 ft) height. The fire caused damage to the transmitter, and the broadcasting was interrupted until the damage was removed.

== Demolition ==
With the completion of the Küçük Çamlıca TV Radio Tower on the neighboring hill, the steel transmitter masts were all removed and integrated in the new towers. The tower was demolished in late 2020.
