= Çamlıca Hill =

Hill in Istanbul, Turkey

- Çamlıca Tepesi
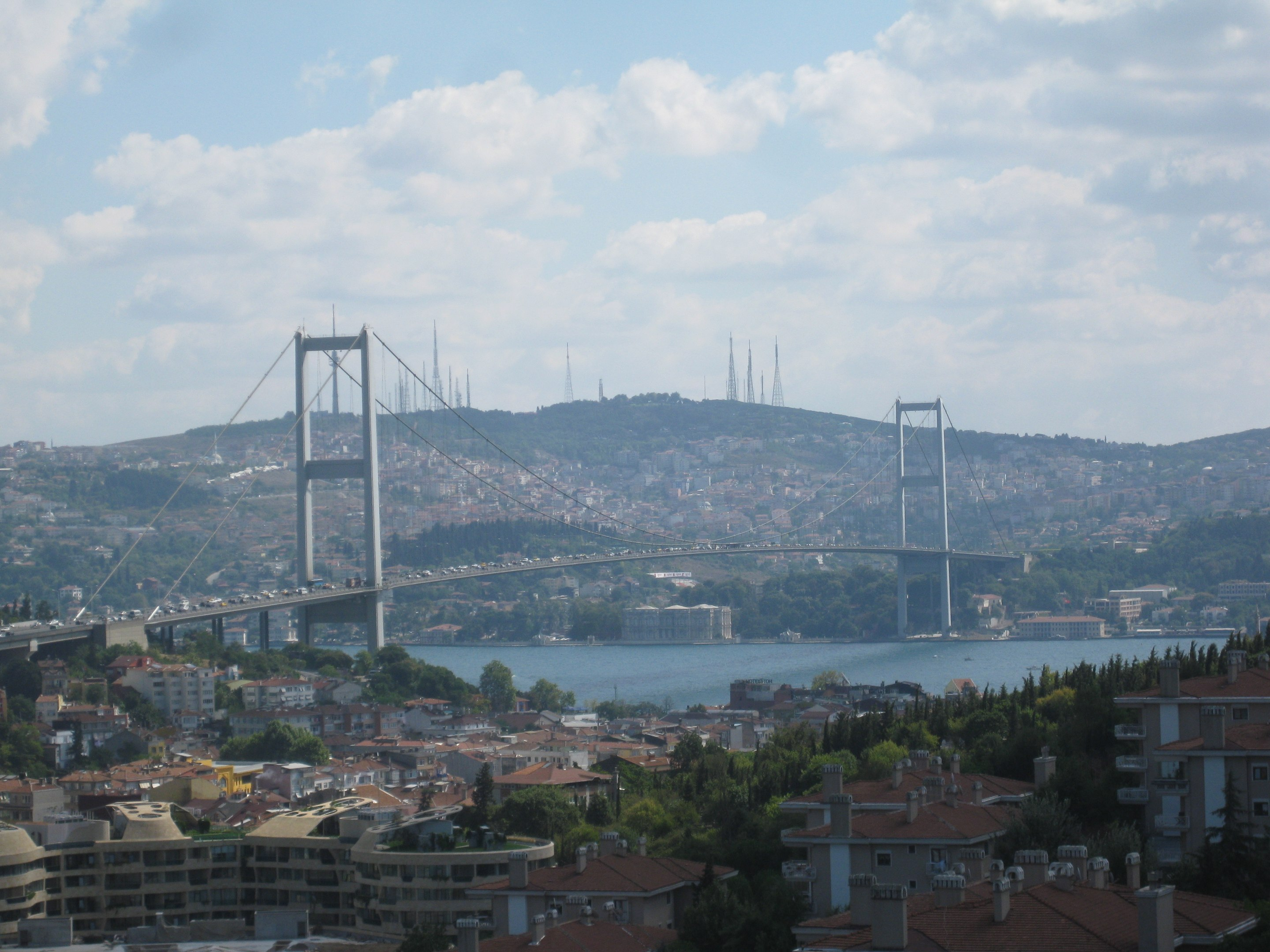
- A view of Çamlıca Hill behind the Bosphorus Bridge.

Highest point
- Elevation: 288 m (945 ft)
- Coordinates: 41°1′39″N 29°4′6″E

Geography
- Location within Istanbul
- Location: Üsküdar, Istanbul

Çamlıca Hill (Turkish pronunciation: [tʃamlɯdʒa]) (Turkish: Çamlıca Tepesi), a.k.a. Big Çamlıca Hill (Turkish: Büyük Çamlıca Tepesi) to differentiate it from the nearby Little Çamlıca Hill (Turkish: Küçük Çamlıca Tepesi), is a hill in the Üsküdar district of the Asian side of Istanbul, Turkey. At 288 m (945 ft) above sea level, Çamlıca Hill offers a panoramic view of the southern part of Bosphorus and the mouth of the Golden Horn.

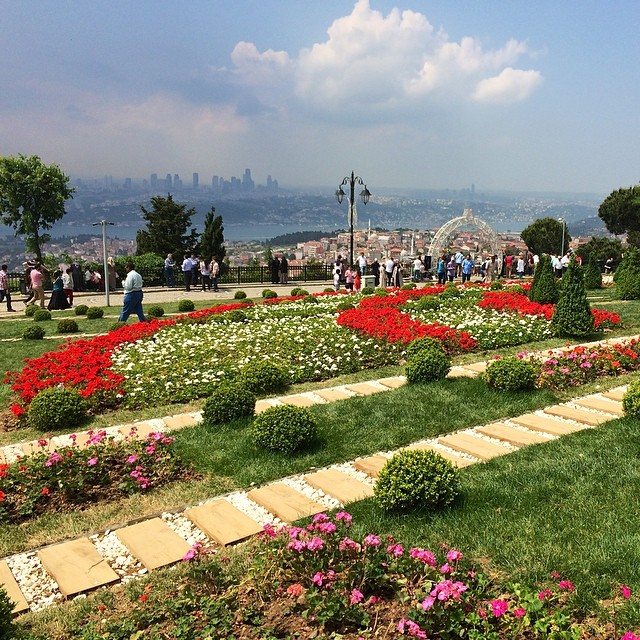
Public park on Çamlıca Hill

The hill is a popular visitor attraction with Ottoman-themed teahouses, cafes and a restaurant inside a public park with monumental trees, flower gardens and fountains, run by the Istanbul Metropolitan Municipality.

== Noteworthy structures ==
=== Çamlıca Mosque ===
On completion in 2019, Çamlıca Mosque became the largest mosque in Asia Minor, able to accommodate 63,000 people and incorporating a museum, art gallery, library, conference hall and underground parking lot.

=== Çamlıca Tower ===
Prior to 2021 numerous radio masts and towers (such as Çamlıca TRT Television Tower) occupied much of the available land on the hill. The Turkish Ministry of Transport and Infrastructure decided to consolidate all the broadcasting facilities to a single tower freeing up much of the land on the hill. The new tower is 369 m (1,211 ft) high and includes observation decks and restaurants. Çamlıca Tower (Turkish: Çamlıca Kulesi) was inaugurated on May 29, 2021.
