= BELTUR =

Turkish company

- Type: public company
- Founded: 1 January 1970
- Parent: Istanbul Metropolitan Municipality
- Website: Official website

BELTUR (Büyük İstanbul Eğitim Turizm ve Sağlık Yatırımları İşletme ve Ticaret - English: Great Istanbul Education Tourism and Health Investments Management and Trade) is a Turkish company that operates cafes in hospitals and tourist locations.

In 2020, the Turkish Ministry of Health did not renew their contract with BELTUR (leading to the closure of 62 cafes) and the company was investigated for alleged tax evasion.

== History ==
BELTUR started running buffets in Turkish state hospitals in December 2013.

The company temporarily closed down most of its locations in 2020 in response to the COVID-19 pandemic. On 8 June 2020, these were opened again.

In July 2020, 62 locations in 46 state hospitals were closed again after the Ministry of Health decided to not renew their contract with the company, with the ministry citing that BELTUR wasn't paying rent.

== Criticism and controversy ==
In October 2020, the Ministry of Treasury and Finance launched an investigation against the company, after BELTUR was suspected with being involved in tax evasion.

In September 2021, BELTUR was criticized by pro-government newspaper Akşam for having "exorbitant prices".
