= Turkish Levantine =

Descendants of Europeans who settled in the Ottoman Empire

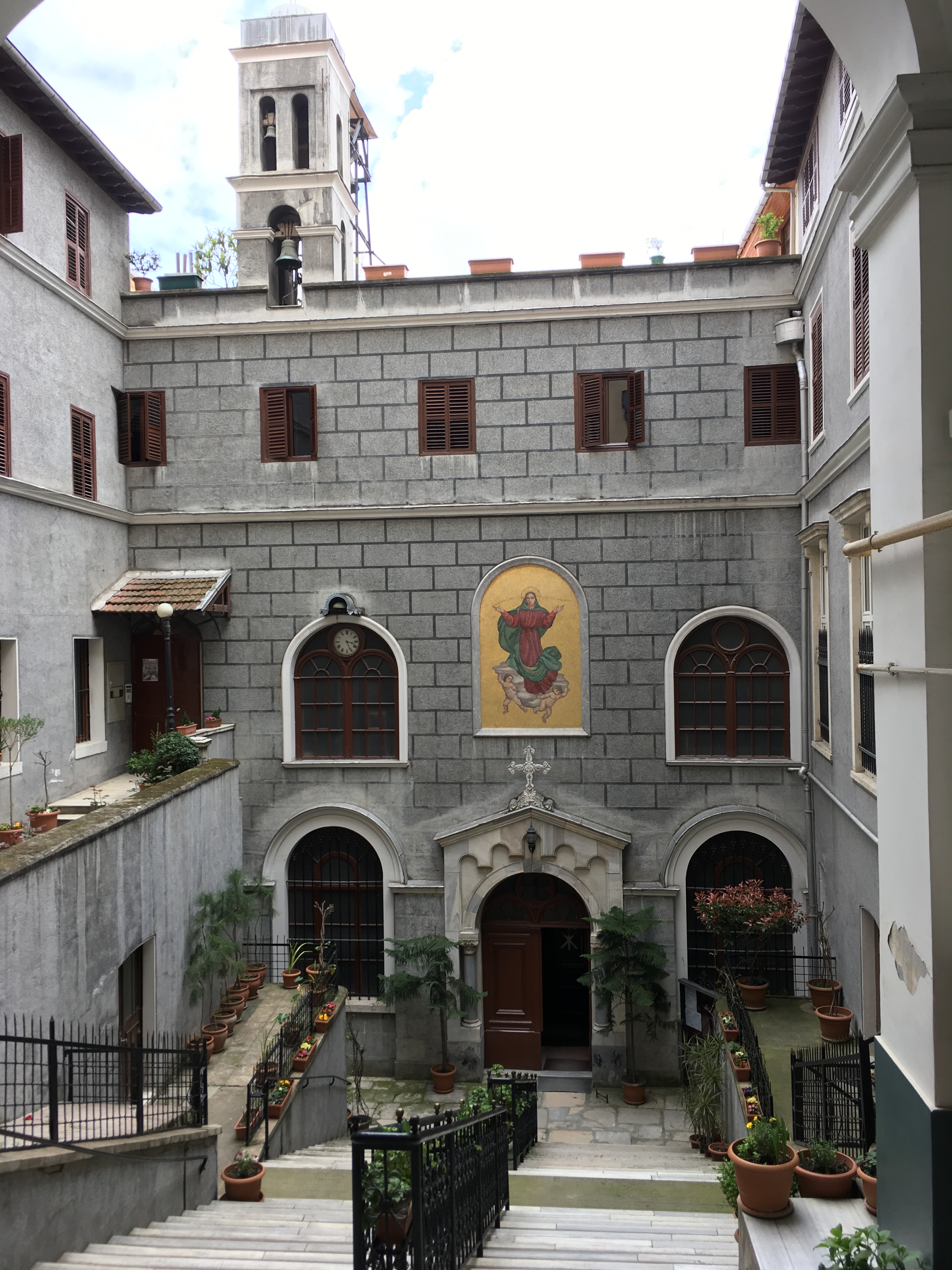
Church of St. Mary Draperis is one of the most ancient Levantine Catholic parishes of Istanbul.

Levantines in Turkey or Turkish Levantines, are the descendants of Western Europeans who settled in the coastal cities of the Ottoman Empire to trade, especially after the Tanzimat era. Their estimated population today is around 1,000. They mainly reside in Istanbul, İzmir and Mersin. Anatolian Muslims called Levantines Frenk (variation of Farang, often translated as "Frank") and tatlısu Frengi (lit. 'freshwater Frank'; due to their high-standard lifestyle) in addition to Levanten. Turkish Levantines are mostly Latin Catholics.

Over time the term Levant was widened in scope. During the era of the Byzantines and the first years of the Ottomans, the term was used to refer to Western Mediterranean peoples such as Italians, Catalans, and French. During the 18th and 19th centuries, the term also was used for settlers that came from Central and Northern Europe.

== History ==
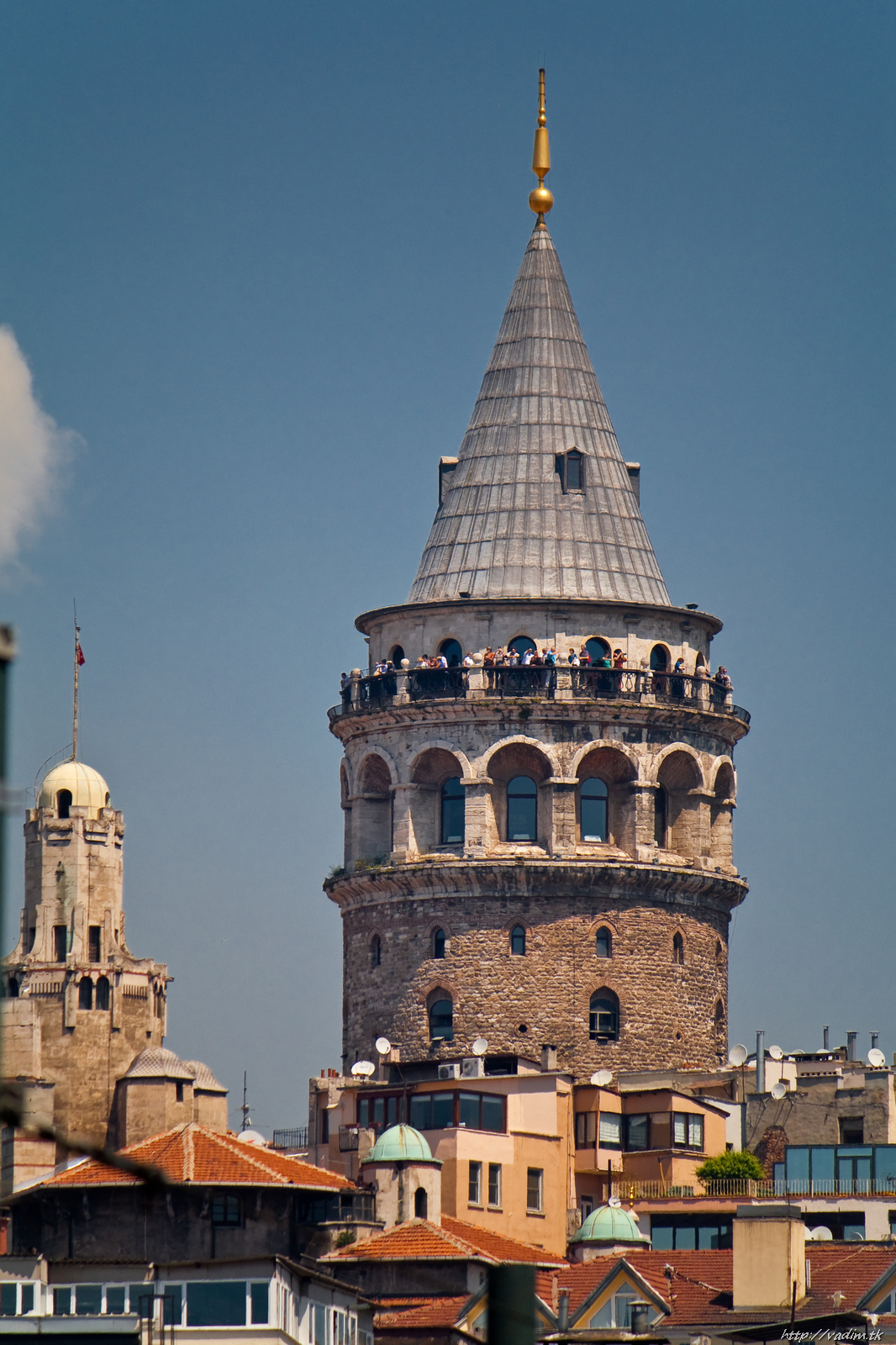
The most important symbol of Genoese heritage in Istanbul, Galata Kulesi

=== First Levantines ===
Levantines began to settle in Constantinople in 991 when they were given some trade privileges from the Byzantines. They settled on the Istanbul peninsula and Galata. Pera was the settlement of Genoese and Venetians. In later years, traders from Amalfi and Pisa were given these privileges.

After the fall of the Roman Empire, there were increasing differences between Latin-Western and Greek-Eastern Christians. According to Ortaylı, the first significant Levantines were Genoese merchants who had traded with Byzantines.

The second significant group of Levantines were Venetians. At that time, Eastern Roman power was decreasing while Ottomans were gaining ground. Venetian merchants traded across the Mediterranean during the Byzantine era and built the Galata Tower. Venetians and Ottomans were also allies against the Genoese-Byzantine alliance.

Genoese were more active in the Anatolian Peninsula while Venetians were powerful in the Aegean islands. There were also several Italian city-states that were active in and around Anatolia. The Crusades also played an important role in the lives of Levantines.

The cities chosen by Levantines were settled in important trade routes and they were also safer places. Istanbul was the center of the Ottoman Empire and İzmir was a safe city located within a gulf and feeding Istanbul with its potential. İzmir was also a center for fresh produce such as grapes, figs, olives, and okra. Consequently, Venetians and French began to settle in İzmir after Genoese traders. Over time Italian influence began to decrease and British, Dutch, and German merchants increased their ties with the Anatolian coast. They also married other non-Catholic and non-Protestant Christians, especially Greek Orthodox.

=== Capitulations and Tanzimat ===
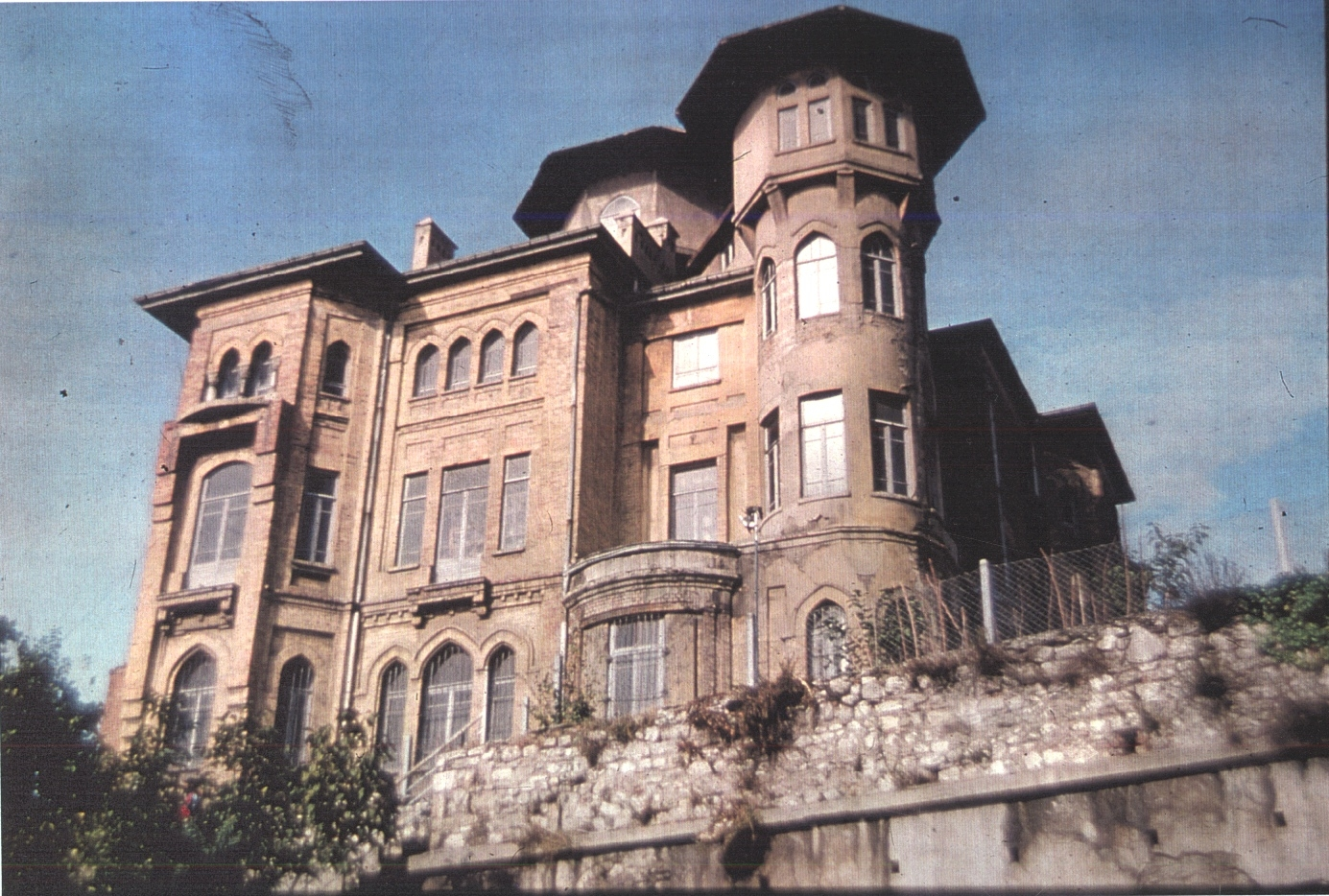
The Bulgur Palas in Istanbul, work of Levantine architect Giulio Mongeri

French merchants began to play an active role in Levant trade routes after the French-Ottoman alliance. Ottomans gave safe passage for French traders and approved the capitulations for the French state.

Especially after the Tanzimat Era, the capitulations were approved for other European states. Consequently, there was a significant increase in the numbers of Europeans who came to Ottoman territories, especially in coastal cities. European traders were not Ottoman citizens, so they did not have to pay taxes nor were they obliged to serve in the army. Therefore, these Europeans became wealthier over time. In addition, they became pioneers in industrialization and Western art.

=== 20th century ===
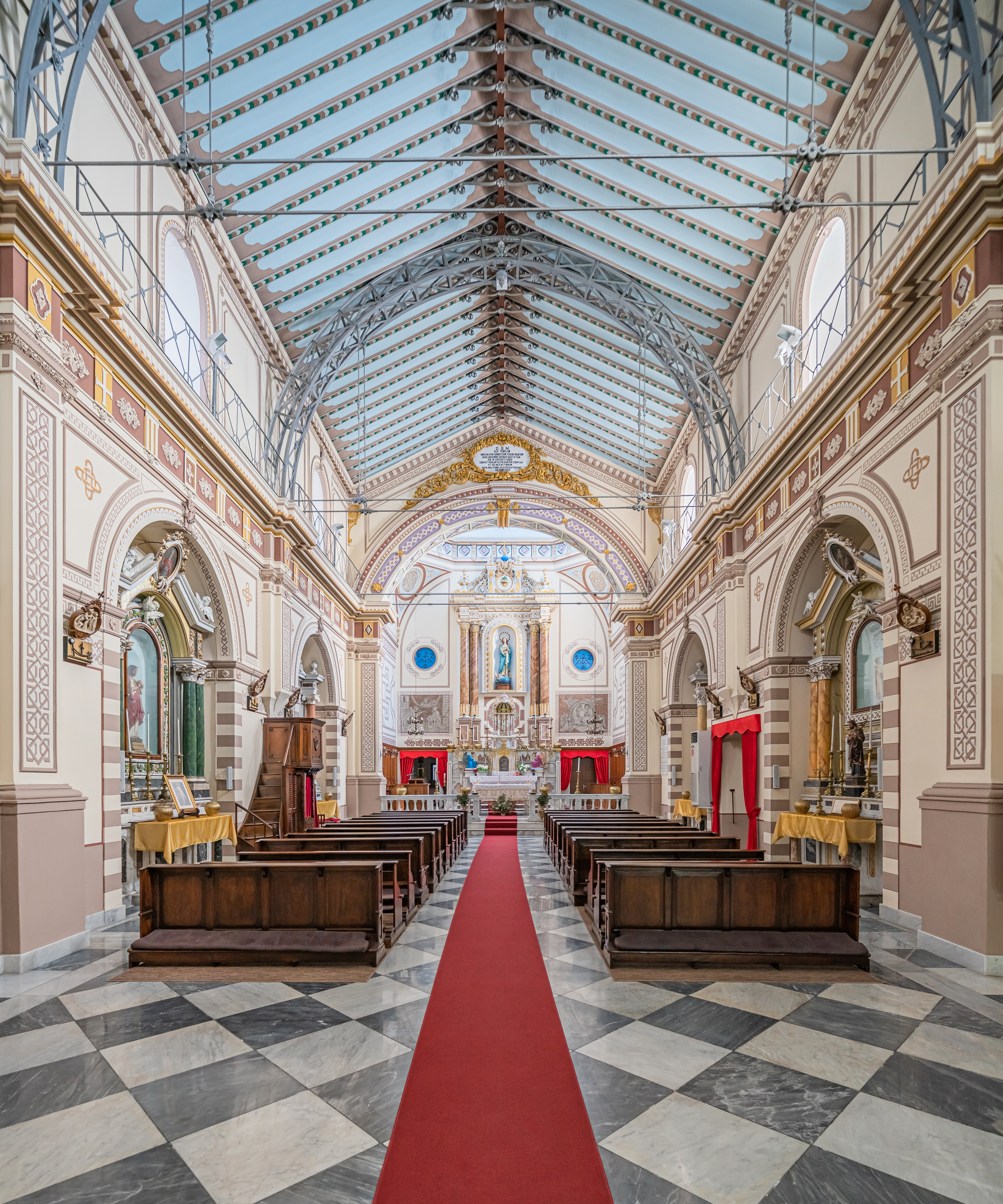
Interior of Saint Mary's Catholic Church, İzmir.

The Ottoman Empire fought against the British, French and Italians during World War I. The victorious states of World War I compelled the Ottoman government to sign the Treaty of Sèvres. The United Kingdom, Italy, and France were among the occupants of Anatolia. After the independence of Turkey, there was negative public opinion towards Levantines because of allegations that Levantines had cooperated with the Allies. After the Great Fire of Smyrna, most of the Levantines left Smyrna (now İzmir), and only a few ever returned.

After the Committee of Union and Progress (CUP) came into power after the 1908 Revolution, Levantines began to be affected by the policies of Turkish nationalists. In September 1914, before formally entering WWI, the CUP government took the bold move to unilaterally cancel the capitulation system, thus turning the Levantines, and other foreigners from the Western powers, into ordinary residents subject to local taxes and legal jurisdiction. Post-war, it is also said, yet not proven, that Levantines were also not happy with the increasing Greek presence in the city of Smyrna. The Greek occupation in Smyrna weakened their economic power in the city. In addition, their economic interests suffered due to World War I and in the first years of modern Turkey. The Great Depression affected Levantines significantly. They quit their jobs and began to leave Turkey due to new wealth taxes imposed on non-Moslems, the removal of capitulations that had been granted by the Ottoman sultans, as well as to rapidly rising costs. Their settlements became government property.

There were significant problems in the Turkish economy after the Levantines and Greeks left the country. Turkey faced export problems; most of its exports remained in the hands of local Turkish villagers who had relied on the Levantine export houses. [However, the Turkish government left all capitulations of Levantines to break the monopoly for Turkish entrepreneurs.] The Turkish government under the new Turkish Republic did remove the capitulations.

=== Present ===
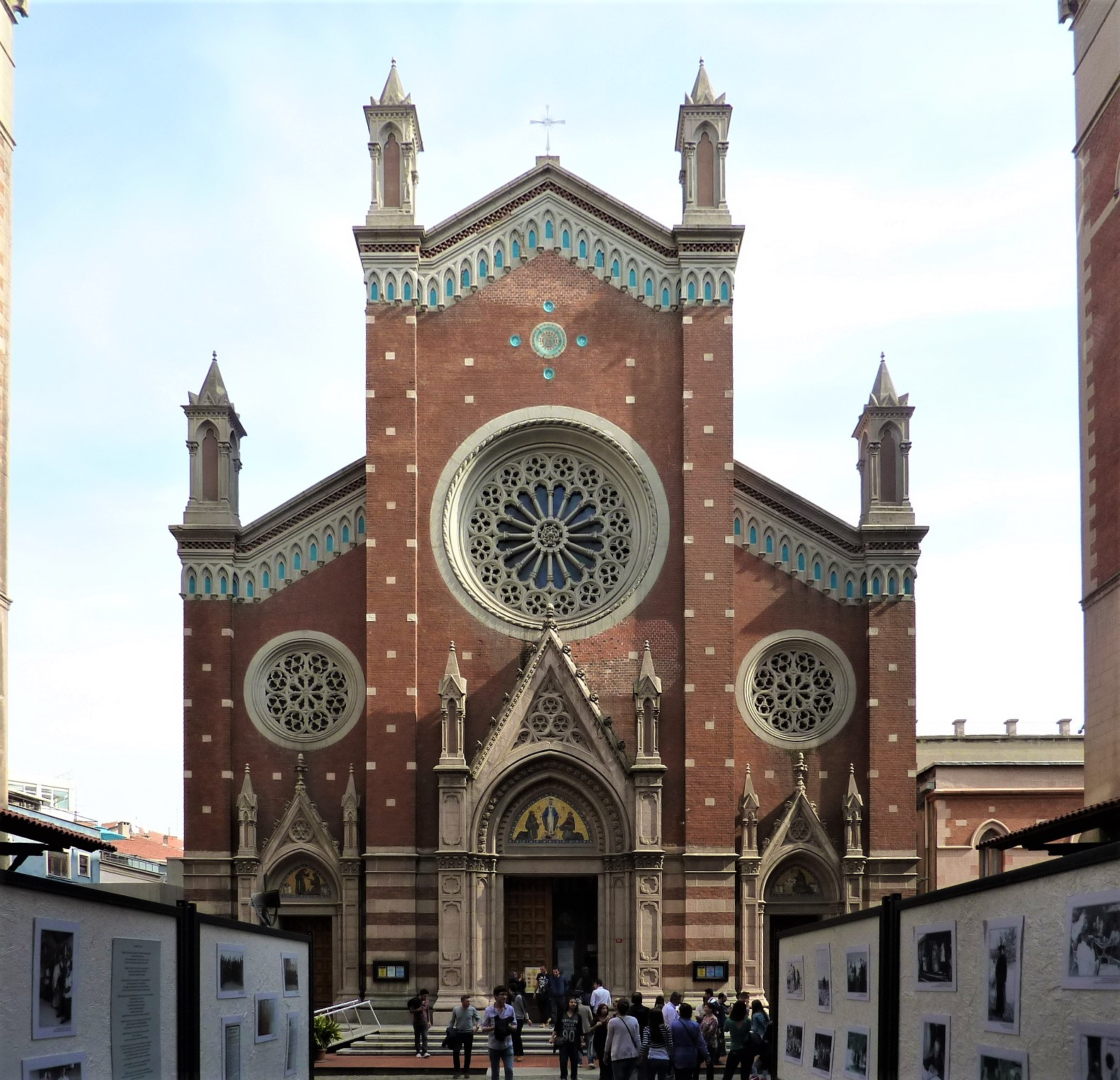
Church of St. Anthony of Padua is one of the most important Levantine Catholic parishes of Istanbul.

Today, the exact number of Levantines is not clear. It is estimated that there are about 100-150 Levantines in the city of İzmir. Another estimate put the number in hundreds. However, the number may be higher because of the assimilation policies of Turkish nationalist-Kemalist governments, conversions to Islam because of fear after the Greek and Armenian genocides, or intermarriage. According to Levantine enthusiast and researcher from İzmir, Andrew Simes in 2023, the population in the city is around 800. In the documentary about the Levantines of İzmir (Bazıları Onlara Levanten Diyor), Levantines call themselves 'Christian Turks', and they say they are not happy to be called Levantines. Despite the fact that they are Christian catholics, the older ones still speak the old Greek dialect used in Smyrna until 1922.

Less than 100 Levantine families are left in Istanbul. However, the number is not clear. The Istanbul pogrom deeply affected the Levantine population as much as Greeks, Armenians, and Jews. After the Istanbul pogrom, it is known that most of the Levantines fled to France, the United States, and other Western European countries. Most of them had second passports, or they only had one passport of the country of their ancestors. Many young Levantines preferred to go abroad rather than stay in Turkey. The remaining Levantines or their descendants have held meetings in Istanbul to protect their heritage and rediscover their past.

There are also several Levantines left in Mersin and Iskenderun. There are still some families in Mersin who are the descendants of Europeans: they often have the names of Levante, Montavani, Babini, Brecotti, Şaşati, Vitel, Talhuz, Antoine-Mirzan, Nadir, Rexya, Soysal, Hisarlı, Kokaz, Daniel, Kokalakis, or Yalnız. Mersin Catholic Church is still active in the city. Some of the members of the church are still Maronites.

== Levantine population in the past ==
=== Istanbul (Constantinople) ===
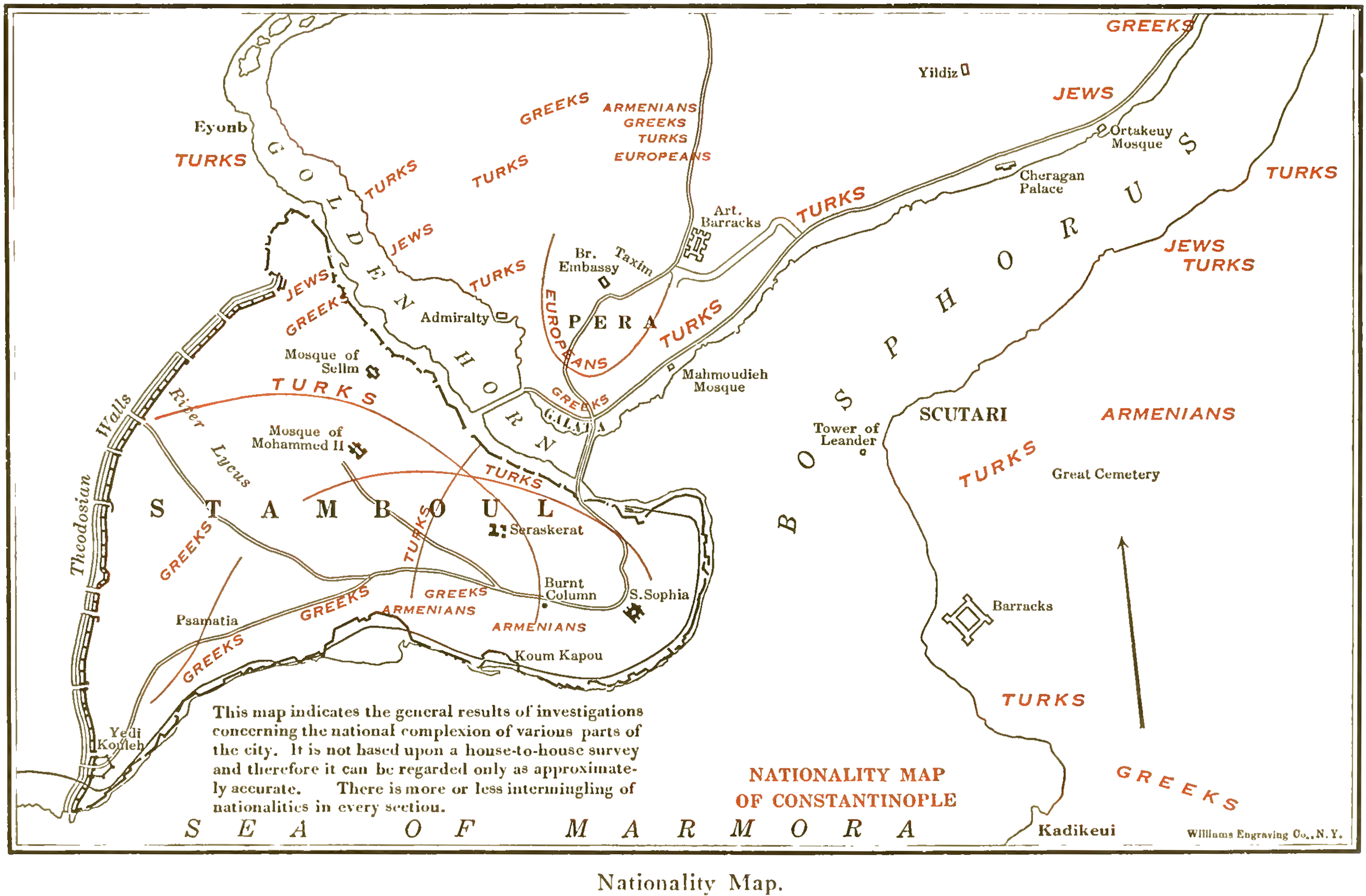
Levantines in Constantinople (now Istanbul)

The first Levantines in the Ottoman territories lived in the Pera (Beyoğlu) and Galata districts of Constantinople, now known as Istanbul. The peak population of Levantines was during the 19th century, with 14,000 people.

=== İzmir (Smyrna) ===
In 1818, traveller William Jowett described the distribution of Smyrna (now İzmir)'s population: 60,000 Turks, 40,000 Greeks, 10,000 Jews, 3,000 Latins, 7,000 Armenians.

In 1856, the Ottoman state allowed Christians to have possessions. Consequently, the number of Levantines in Smyrna began to increase dramatically. The non-Muslim population was 15,000 in 1847, while it increased to 50,000 in 1880. Smyrna became a Levantine city and began to be known as 'the capital of the Levant', 'the pearl of the Levant', 'the Marseille of the Anatolian coast' or 'Marseille on the coast of Asia Minor'.

19th-century sources estimated the population of Levantines between 16,000 and 25,000. This amounts of a minimum of 8% of Smyrna's population, while the maximum estimate is 17%.

Non-Muslim peoples of Smyrna lived in different quarters. There was one each quarter for Turks, Greeks, Armenians, Jews, and Frenks (Levantines). 1914 population estimate indicates; 378,000 Muslims and 217,686 Orthodox Christians.

=== Mersin ===
The Çukurova region gained importance after the planting of cotton that came from the Americas. Therefore, the cities of Adana and Mersin began to attract Europeans. Levantines especially began to settle in Mersin, especially after the 19th century. European entrepreneurs created the 'Frenk Quarter' in Mersin. The estimated population during Ottoman times is below:

- In 1879, 625 Muslims, 147 Greeks, 37 Armenians, and 50 Catholics were living in Mersin.
- In 1891, 5,000 Muslims, 2,700 Greeks, 860 Armenians, and 260 Catholics were living in Mersin.

== Culture ==
=== Language ===
There are some Levantine words that have been adopted in the Turkish language, such as "racon" (show-off) and "faça" (face).

=== Religion ===
Levantines are Western Christians, separated by their sects. Most of them are Catholics, while there are Protestants (mainly Anglicans and Baptists) among them.

Levantines have their own churches in some cities. They are named according to their ethnicity or sect, such as Alman Protestan Kilisesi (German Protestant Church) or İzmir Baptist Kilisesi (İzmir Baptist Church). Churches in İzmir are sometimes called the 'Levantine Church'.

Churches

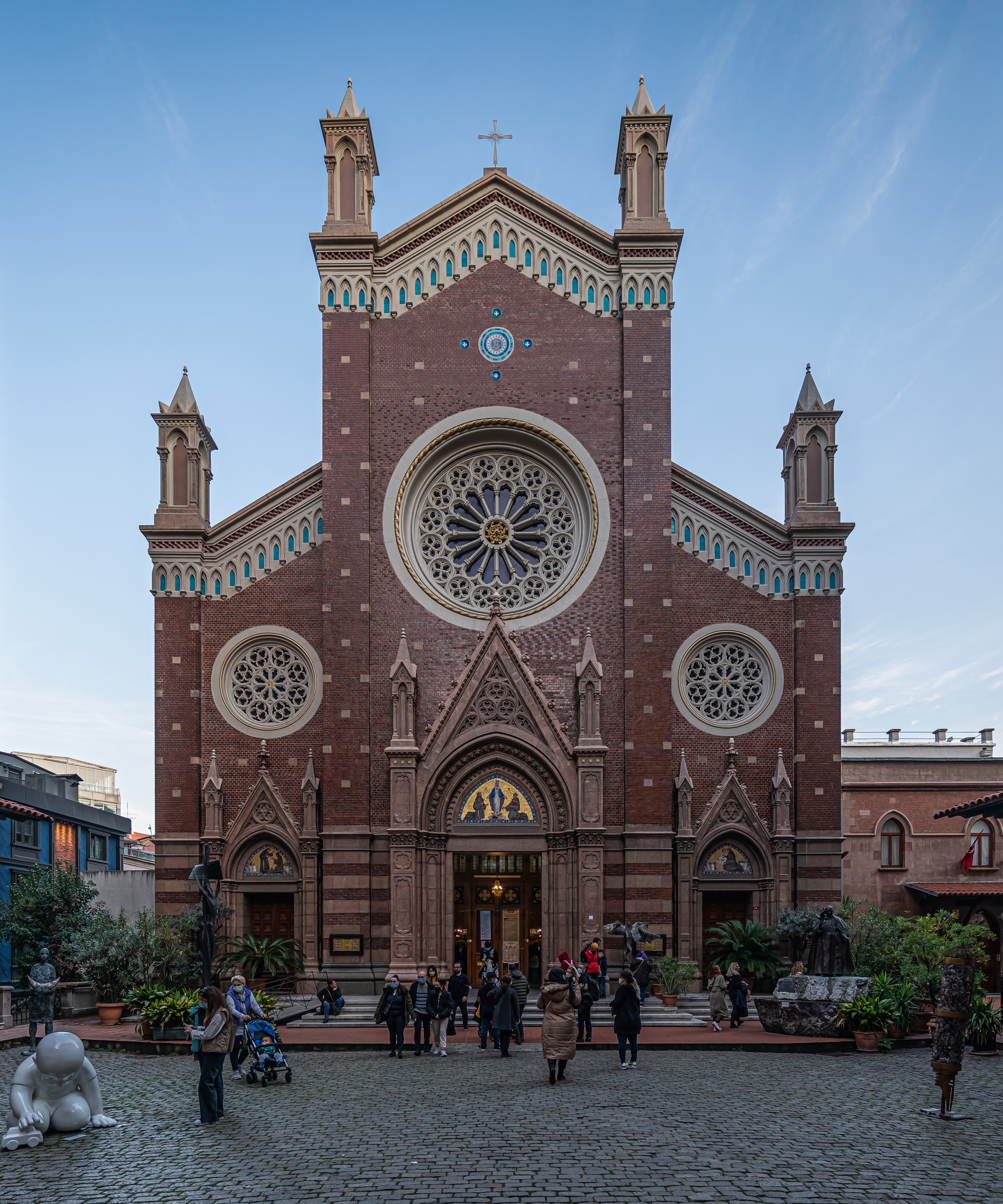
Church of St. Anthony of Padua, Istanbul

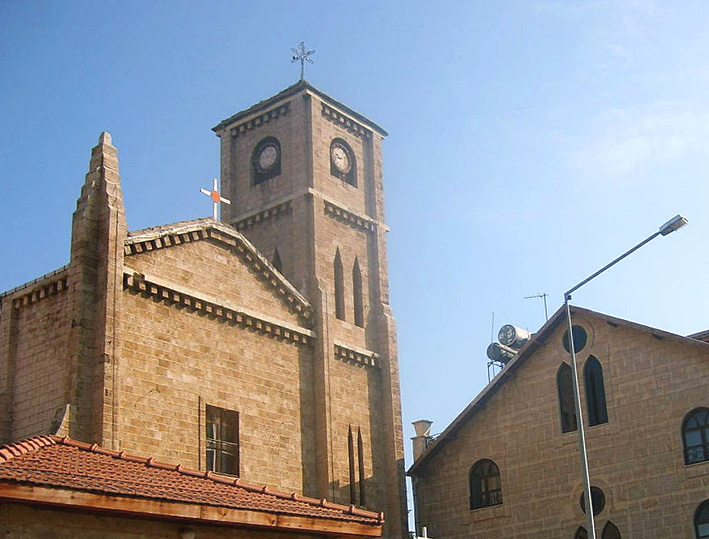
Church of St. Anthony, Mersin

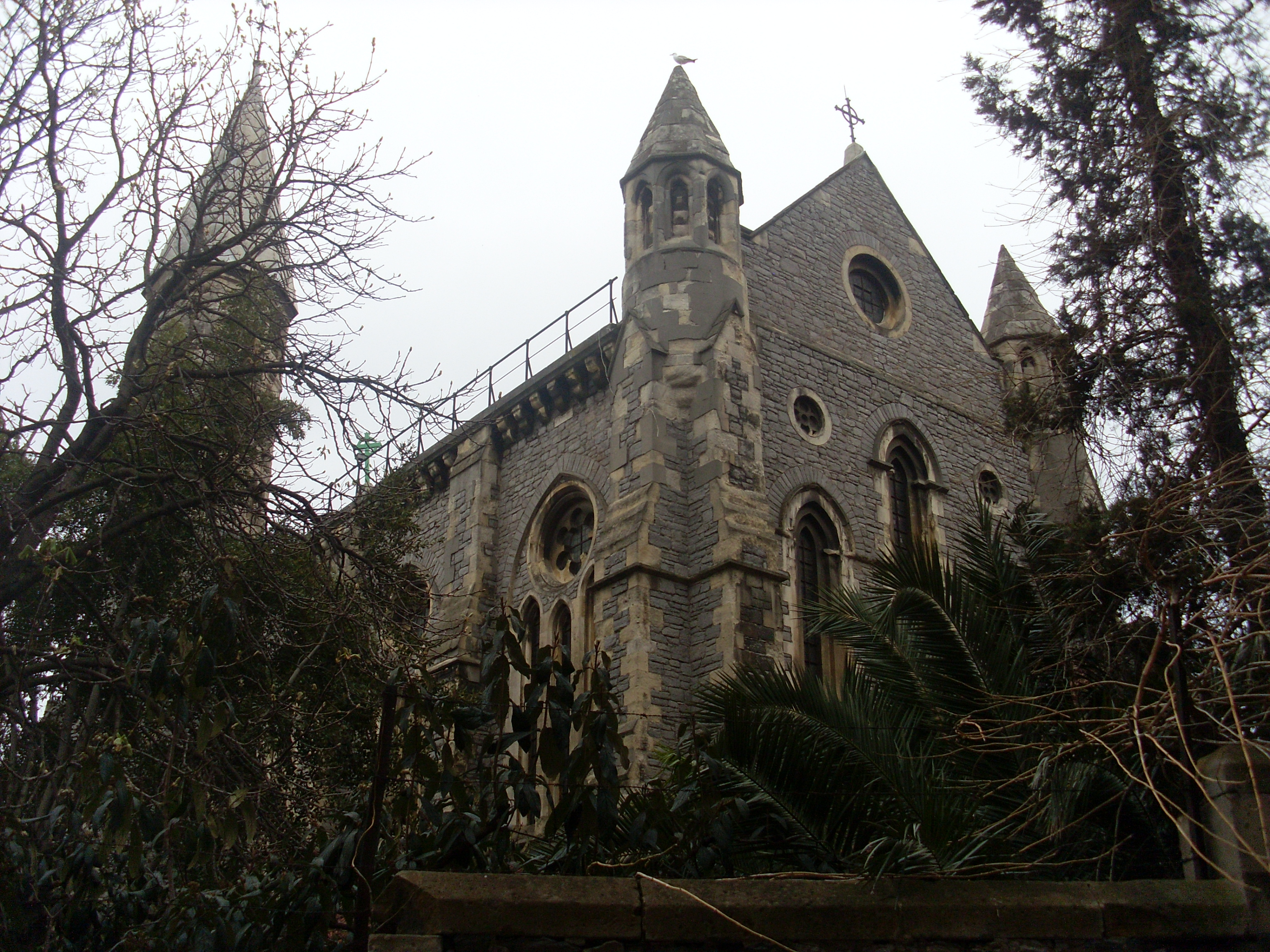
Crimea Memorial Church, İstanbul

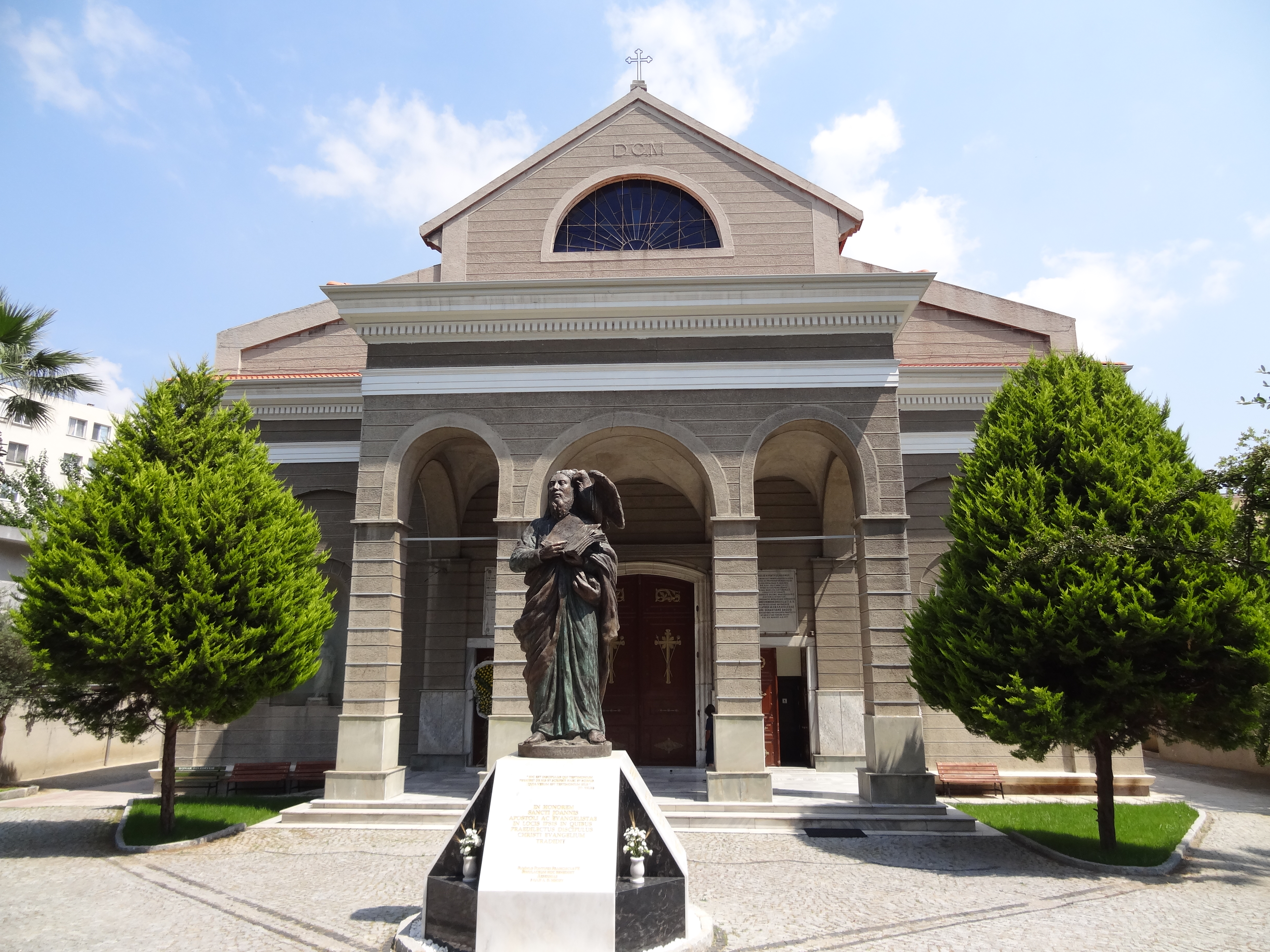
St. John's Cathedral, İzmir

=== Education ===
There are French, Italian, German, and Austrian schools in Istanbul and İzmir. However, most of their students are Turks. These schools are counted as private schools.

Schools

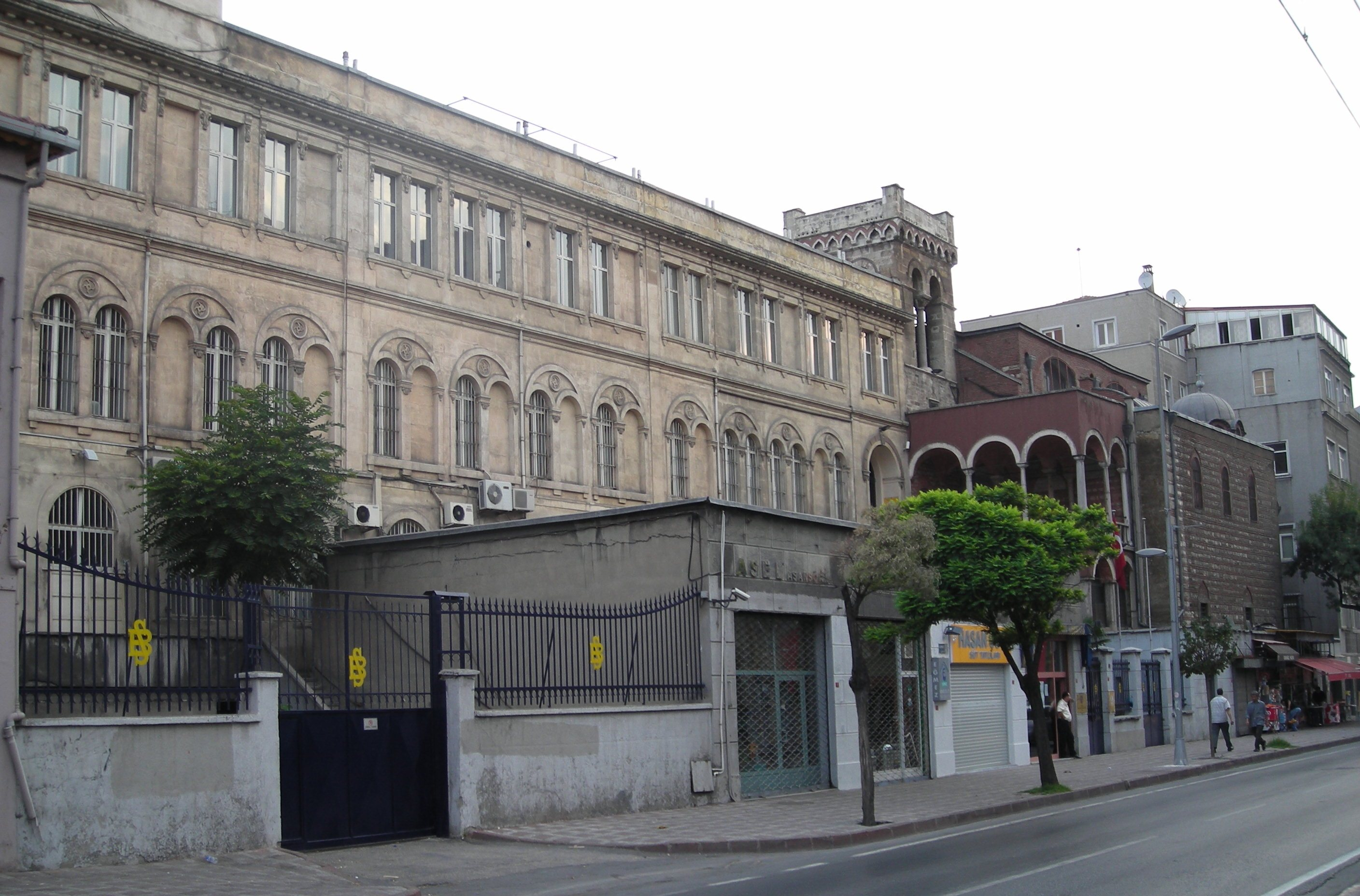
Saint Benoît French School, İstanbul

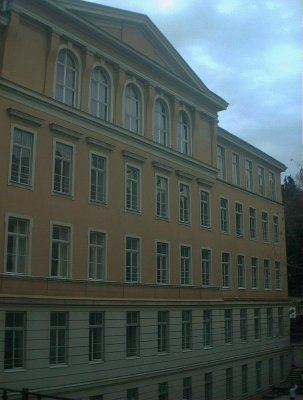
Liceo Italiano Statale Istanbul, İstanbul

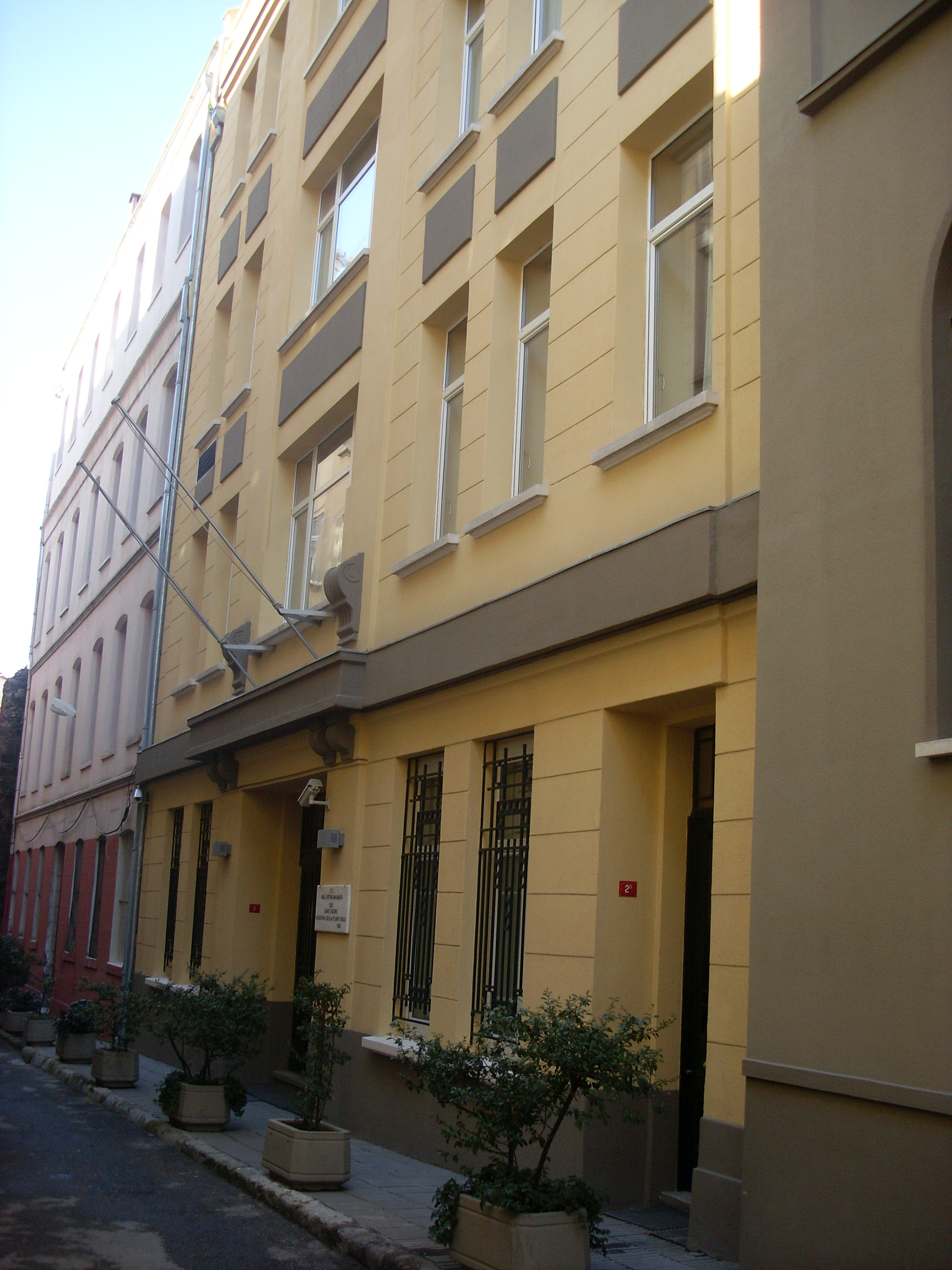
St. George's Austrian High School, İstanbul

=== Architecture ===
One of the oldest buildings of the Levantines is Galata Tower in Istanbul. It was in the European quarter until 1453. After the fall of Istanbul, Venetians surrendered the tower to Ottomans.

İzmir is the most important city for the remaining historic Levantine architecture. Karşıyaka (Courdelion), Bornova (Bournabad), and Buca (Boudja) were known as the center of Levantines in İzmir until the Turkish War of Independence. Levantines left tens of buildings in İzmir; most of them are mansions once belonging to European merchant families. Some of them are listed below:

Name	Nationality	Place
Aliotti Mansion	Italian	Bornova
Lochner Mansion	German	Bornova
Penetti Mansion	Italian	Karşıyaka
Van der Zee Mansion	Dutch	Karşıyaka
De Jongh Mansion	British-Dutch	Buca
Rees Mansion	British	Buca
Baltazzi Mansion	Italian	Buca
Forbes Mansion	British	Buca
Giraud Mansion	French	Bornova
Peterson Mansion	Scottish	Bornova
Edwards Mansion	British	Bornova
Bardisbanian Mansion	Armenian	Bornova
Belhomme Mansion	British	Bornova
Whittall Mansion	British	Bornova

There are also some inns and konaks in Mersin that still stand today.

== Notable people ==
- Theodor Axenfeld, ophthalmologist
- Édouard Balladur, French prime minister (1993–1995)
- Sir Alfred Biliotti, British consular official and amateur archaeologist
- Enrico Braggiotti, Turkish-born Monegasque banker, former president of the Banca Commerciale Italiana
- Count Abraham Camondo, financier, philanthropist, and the patriarch of the Camondo family
- Moïse de Camondo, banker and art collector
- Prince Alexandru Coconul, Prince of Wallachia from 1623 to 1627, and then the Prince of Moldavia from 1629 to 1630
- Giuseppe Donizetti, musician, instructor general of the Imperial Ottoman music at the court of Sultan Mahmud II
- Giulio Mongeri, architect, member of the First national architectural movement
- Andrew Mango, author and BBC's former Head of the South European Service
- Cyril Mango, scholar of the history, art, and architecture of the Byzantine Empire
- Isaac Morier, British consul-general of the Levant Company at Istanbul
- James Justinian Morier, British diplomat, author of The Adventures of Hajji Baba of Ispahan
- Raymond Charles Péré, architect, designer of the İzmir Clock Tower
- Amedeo Preziosi, Maltese painter
- Giovanni Scognamillo, writer and film critic
- Faruk Süren, former chairman of Galatasaray
- Osvaldo Valenti, film actor
- Edward Whittall, merchant and amateur botanist
