= Bulgur Palas =

Historical mansion in Turkey

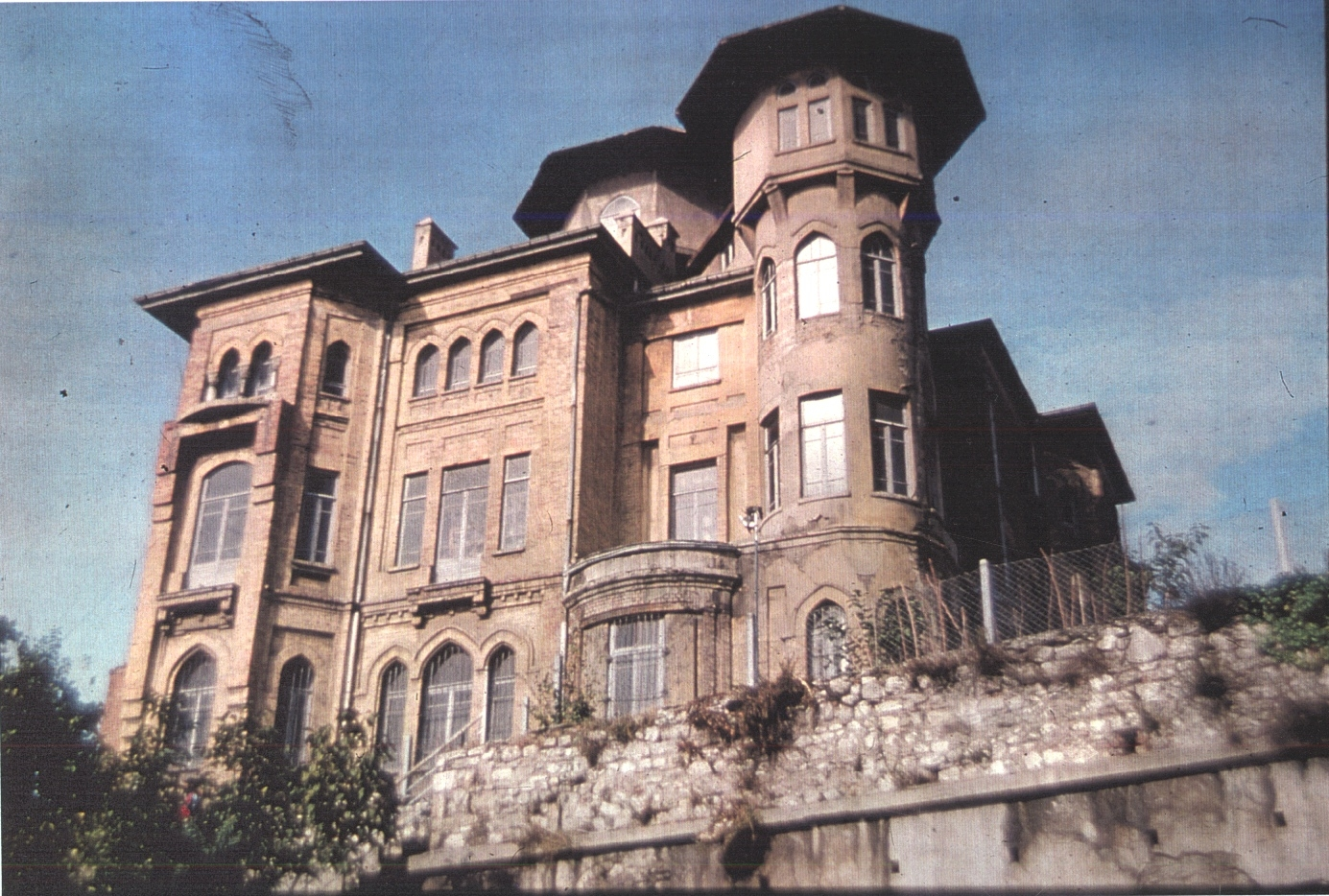
- Bulgur Palas in the 1990s as office building of Ottoman Bank
- Interactive map of the Bulgur Palas area

General information
- Architectural style: First national architectural movement
- Location: Aksaray, Kargı Çk. 5, 34096 Fatih, Istanbul
- Coordinates: 41°00′25″N 28°56′38″E
- Construction started: 1912; 114 years ago
- Renovated: 2021
- Owner: Istanbul Metropolitan Municipality (İBB)

Technical details
- Floor count: 5
- Floor area: 3,750 m^{2} (40,400 sq ft)

Design and construction
- Architect: Alessandro Valeri

The Bulgur Palas, originally known as the Bolulu Habip Bey Mansion, is a historical mansion located in Istanbul, Turkey. It was restored and redeveloped into a library and cultural center for public use after its acquisition by the Istanbul Metropolitan Municipality in 2021.

== Location ==
The Bulgur Palas is located on Kocamustafapaşa Hill, one of the seven hills of Istanbul, at Kargı Çıkmazı 5, in Aksaray in Fatih, a municipality of Istanbul in Turkey.

== History ==
The mansion was commissioned by Mehmet Habip Bey (1878–1926), a soldier and a deputy of Bolu from the Committee of Union and Progress in the Ottoman Parliament of the Second Constitutional era (1908–1920), and it was thought to be designed in 1912 by Giulio Mongeri (1873–1951), a Levantine architect of Italian descent, however, a recent discovery has revealed that the building was in fact designed by Alessandro Valeri at a later date. The construction of the house, also called the Bolulu Habip Bey Mansion, was financed by the trade in grain and bulgur, a cracked wheat foodstuff, during World War I.

Habip Bey was arrested after the Armistice of Mudros in 1918, and exiled to Malta in 1919, leaving construction unfinished. As a result of financial difficulties he encountered during that period, the house was mortgaged to the Ottoman Bank as security for a loan. After his sudden death in 1926 from a heart attack, the building was transferred to the Ottoman Bank as collateral for the family's debts. For a period of time, the mansion was used as a bank archive, and its three apartments as residences for bank employees and their families. A downstairs room was reserved as a birdhouse for hundreds of domestic canaries, which were probably raised to live in the branches of the Ottoman Bank. The building was later abandoned.

In 1955, the mansion became the target of looting during the Istanbul pogrom because of the non-Muslim families living there at that time and the non-Turkish character of the Ottoman Bank. The building remained under the ownership of the Ottoman Bank and passed in 2001 into the ownership of Garanti Bank, which had acquired the Ottoman Bank. In 2021, the Istanbul Metropolitan Municipality purchased the Bulgur Palas, and began efforts to restore the building, intending to open it to the public as a document center, archive, library, exhibition hall, and café. The building was opened to visitors on 28 February 2024.

== Architecture ==
Mongeri's design exhibits traces of the First national architectural movement. The building consists of three full floors and one half floor. According to the current owner, the building has five floors. There is also an observation terrace. The main body of the building is constructed with unplastered red brick, and only the part with the towers is plastered. There is a railing-free deck around the domed roof at the top. The mansion is surrounded by extremely high walls.

Bulgur Palas features 3,750 m^{2} (40,400 sq ft) of covered space in 81 independent sections, a 1,750 m^{2} (18,800 sq ft) open area, a 1,000 m^{2} (11,000 sq ft) outbuilding, and a 9 m^{2} (97 sq ft) ornamental pool. The newly established library section with 150-seat capacity contains about 25,000 books and documents.

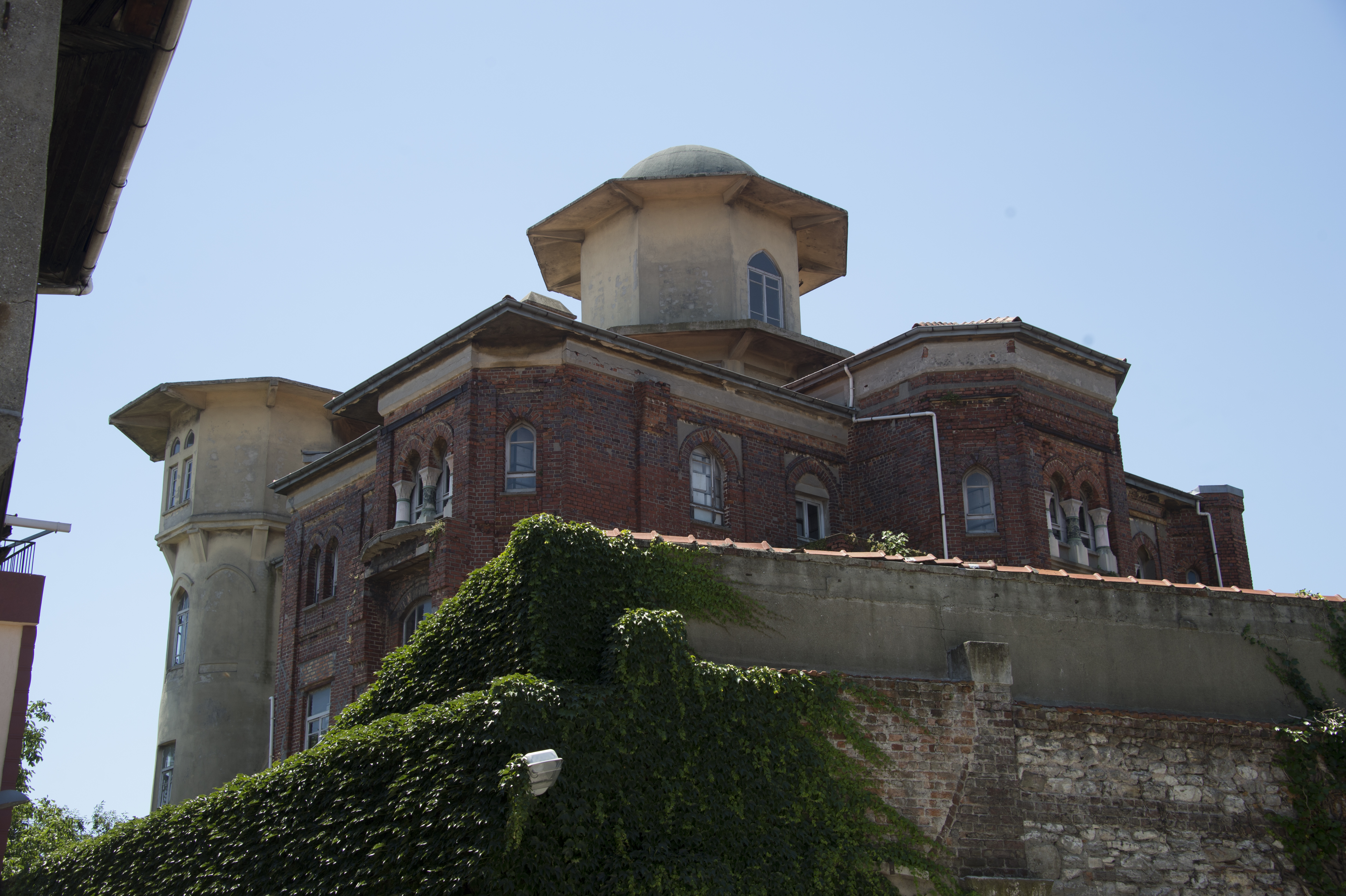
Bulgur Palas (June 2015)

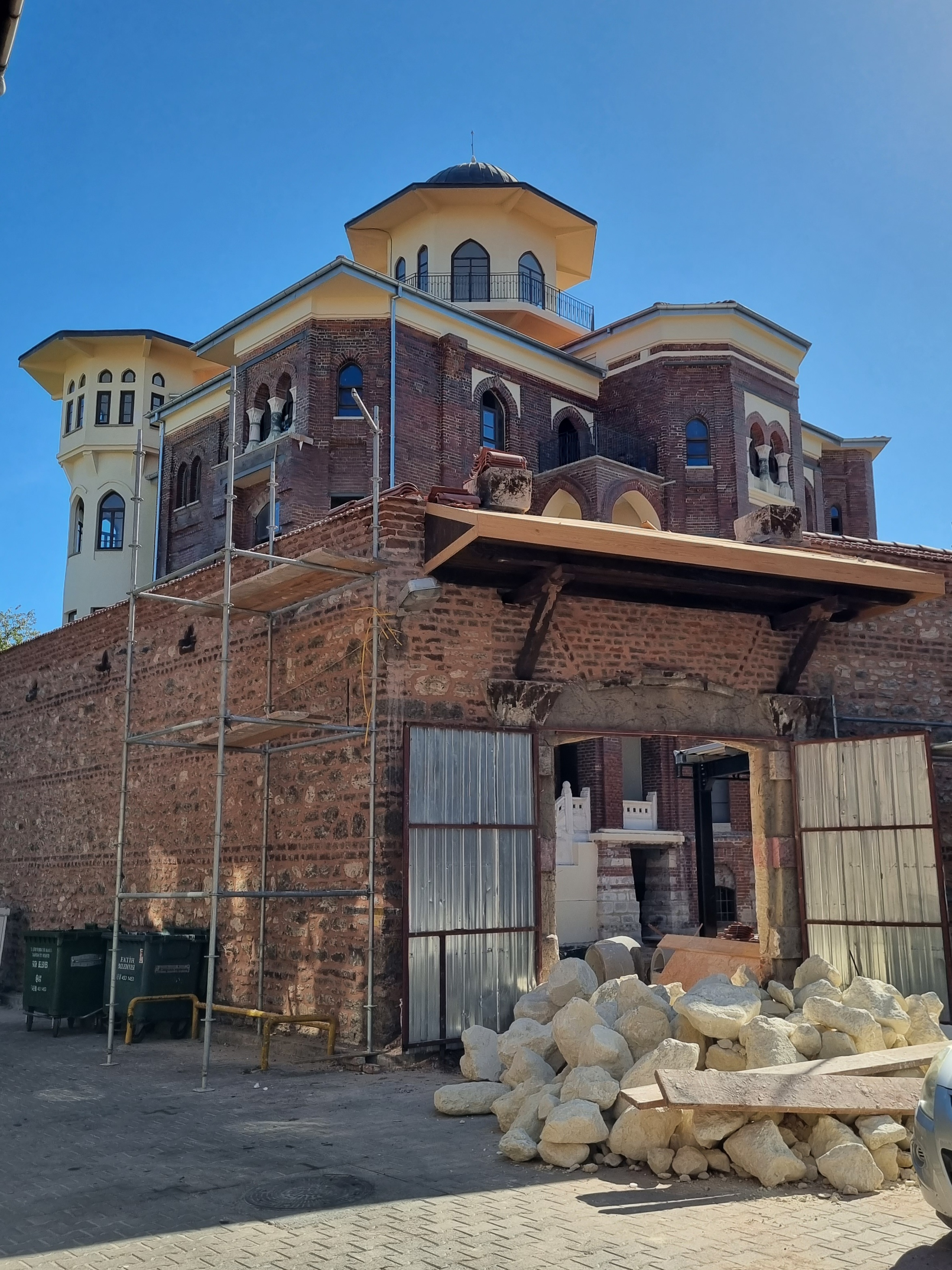
During Restoration (September 2023)
