= Giulio Mongeri =

Turkish architect of Italian-descent (1873–1951)

- Born: 1 August 1873; Istanbul, Ottoman Empire
- Died: 30 November 1951 (aged 78); Venice, Italy
- Resting place: Cimitero Monumentale di Milano
- Citizenship: Turkish
- Education: Accademia di Brera
- Occupation: Architect
- Years active: 1897-1933
- Spouse: 3
- Children: 7

Roberto Giulio Mongeri (1 August 1873 - 30 November 1951) was a Turkish Levantine architect. He designed a number of notable buildings in Istanbul during the late period of the Ottoman Empire and in Ankara and other cities of Turkey in the early years of the Turkish Republic as a member of the First national architectural movement. He taught architecture at the School of Fine Arts in Istanbul.

== Ancestors ==
Like many Italian families, the Mongeri family fled the Austrian occupation after the defeat of the Italians in the Battle of Novara in 1849 during the First Italian War of Independence, and took refuge in the Ottoman Empire. Luigi Mongeri (1818–1882), who studied philosophy and medicine, moved from Crete to Istanbul, then Constantinople. He significantly contributed in the fight against the spread of cholera epidemic in that time. During the reign of Sultan Abdulmejid I (r. 1839–1861), Luigi Mongeri was appointed to a hospital in Istanbul in 1857, and was promoted to the position of the chief physician in 1860. He served also as the personal doctor of the Sultan's sister Adile Sultan (1826–1899). During the reign of Sultan Abdulaziz (r. 1861–1876), he was appointed chief physician of the newly established psychiatric hospital in 1873. He was awarded ordens from The Ottoman Empire and Kingdom of Italy.

== Personal life and early years ==
Roberto Giulio Mongeri was born to Italian-descent Luigi Mongeri and British-descent Tecla Taylor as the youngest child into a Turkish Levantine family in Istanbul on 1 August 1873. He had two brothers Federico and Luigi and a sister Marisa.

Giulio went to Italy with his sister Marisa, and grew up with his uncles Giuseppe and Michele in Milan, where he started studying at Liceo classico Giuseppe Parini. He then continued his education studying architecture at Accademia di Brera in Milan, where his uncle Giuseppe taught. During his education years between 1893 and 1895, he took part in architecture project competition and won bronze medal. In 1896, he was honored with the Luigi Clerichetti award. He graduated on 28 October 1896 with an average score of 9.5 out of 10.

He then started working in Italy for a grain silo construction at Port of Genoa. In summer holidays, he visited his mother and brother in Istanbul. After completion of the grain silo project, he returned to the Ottoman Empire to pursue a career. In his early years in Istanbul, he joined Società Operaia Italiana di Costantinopoli (Italian Workers' Society of Constantinople), today Casa Garibaldi (Garibaldı House), and took part in the architectural works of Italians.

Giulio Mongeri married to Italian-descent Caterina Capodaini (1877–1900), nicknamed Ketty, he met during a summer holiday in his brother's house on Büyükada, Istanbul. She died during the birth of her first child Guido (1900–1935). Giulio married then Caterina's sister Cristina (1879–1917). From this marriage, the five children, Ketty (1904), Alda (1909), Giulio (1910), Elena (1912) and Giovanna (1913), were born. While Elena and her family remained to live in Turkey, other members of the Mongeri family moved to Italy.

During his stay in Istanbul, he was three times married and had seven children. He lived with his children and the nannies in the beginning in Pera, today Beyoğlu, and later in Şişli in houses he designed and built.

== Career ==
His project designs of a church in Lombardian style, a mansion in Italian Renaissance style, a mausoleum in Ancient Greek architectural design as well as an inn and a house in modern design were on display at the Istanbul Exhibition in 1903. In 1907, Mongeri was appointed architect of the Italian Embassy in Istanbul, then the capital of the Ottoman Empire. He was selected corresponding member of the Brera Academy in Milan. He became the official architect of the Ottoman Bank in 1911.

In 1909, Mongeri was appointed to teach in the Architecture Department at the School of Fine Arts (Ottoman Turkish: Sanayi-i Nefise Mektebi), today Mimar Sinan Fine Arts University in Istanbul, which was one of the first institutions in the Ottoman Empire under the direction of Osman Hamdi Bey (1842–1910) to provide architectural education in western manner. With the outbreak of the Italo-Turkish War (1911–1912), some Italian-origin people in the Ottoman Empire were forced to leave the country. So, the Mongeri's duty was suspended. The Municipality of Milan sent Mongeri a certificate of appreciation for his aid and support to his exiled siblings during the war time. He resumed his teaching duty in the academy in 1922, and served in this position auntil 1930.

Some of notable Turkish architects he taught are Arif Hikmet Koyunoğlu (1888–1982), Macit Rüştü Kural (1899–1964), Şevki Balmumcu (1905–1982), Zeki Sayar (1905–2000), Sedad Hakkı Eldem (1908–1988) and Hüsnü Tümer. In 1922, he was honored with the Ordine della Corona d'Italia by the Italian Government. He served as the Consultant Architect of the Hungarian Government in 1930.

Mongeri designed a number of notable buildings primarily in Istanbul, but also in Ankara, Bursa and some other cities between the 1900s and 1930s. He is considered as an important member of the First national architectural movement.

== Works during the late Ottoman Empire period ==
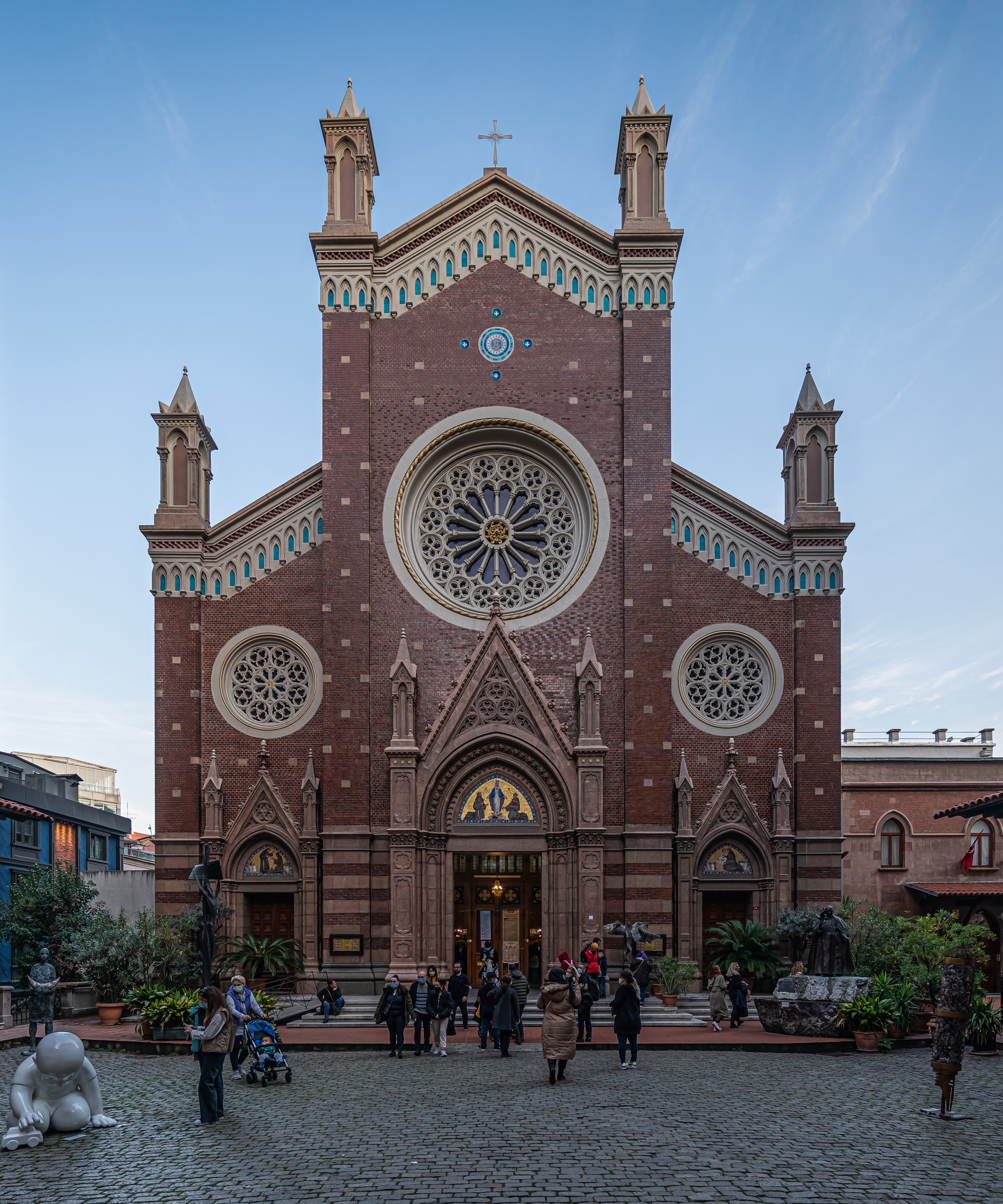
Roman Catholic Church of St. Anthony of Padua, Istanbul.

Mongeri's known first work was his design of the Church of St. Anthony (1906–1912), and apartments, together with Italian-Levantine architect Eduardo de Nari. The buildings he designed during the late years of the Empire in Istanbul were mostly for the Italian community. Among his works, for he preferred Western eclectic architectural style, are the office building of Assicurazioni Generali (1909), Bulgur Palas (1912), the Majik Cinema (1914–1920), the building of the Italian Embassy (1919), today Consulate-General, Karaköy Palas (1920), and Maçka Palas (1922–1926).

== Works during the early Turkish Republican era ==
After the proclamation of the Republic in 1923, he designed buildings in several cities of Turkey becoming a member of the First national architectural movement (1927–1938).

Notable buildings designed by Mongeri in this era are office buildings of the Ottoman Bank in Ankara, İzmir, and Mersin. headquarters of Ziraat Bank in Ankara (1926–1929), and its office buildings in Eskişehir (1926), Adana (1930), Aydın, office building of Türk Ekonomi Bankası in İzmir (1927–1928), office buildings in Ankara of Tekel (1928), İşbank (1929), Spa Hotel Çelik Palas (1930–1935) in Bursa.

He used more ornamentation for the interior and façade of the buildings in Ankara than other Turkish architects of his time. He designed the ceilings of the buildings covered with the new materials steel and glass. The ceilings of the headquarters of Ziraat Bank and İşbank were decorated with stained glass of European floral motfs. His known last design was for the Spa Hotel Çelik Palas in Bursa.

== Later years and death ==
After 1933, Mongeri did not involve in any architectural activities. The importance he gave to the garden of his mansion on Güzelbahçe Sokak (literally: Beautiful Garden Street) in Teşvikiye, Şişli shows his love for nature and flowers. He devoted himself to philately and painting.

In 1941, Mongeri moved to Venice, Italy to live with his daughters Alda and Giovanna. He started painting and drawing. Two paintings from 1942 named Laguna and Lido di Venezia signed by him are known to exist. There are many drawings of Venetian fountains and arches found in his drawing pad.

In 1951, Mongeri went back to Istanbul to visit his daughter Elena. He stayed two months, and had cataract surgery in that time.

After his return to Venice the same year, Giulio Mongeri died at the age of 78 on 30 November 1951. He was buried in the family tomb at Cimitero Monumentale di Milano. On 5 December, a spiritual service was held in his memory at the Church of St. Anthony in Istanbul he had co-designed.

== Gallery ==
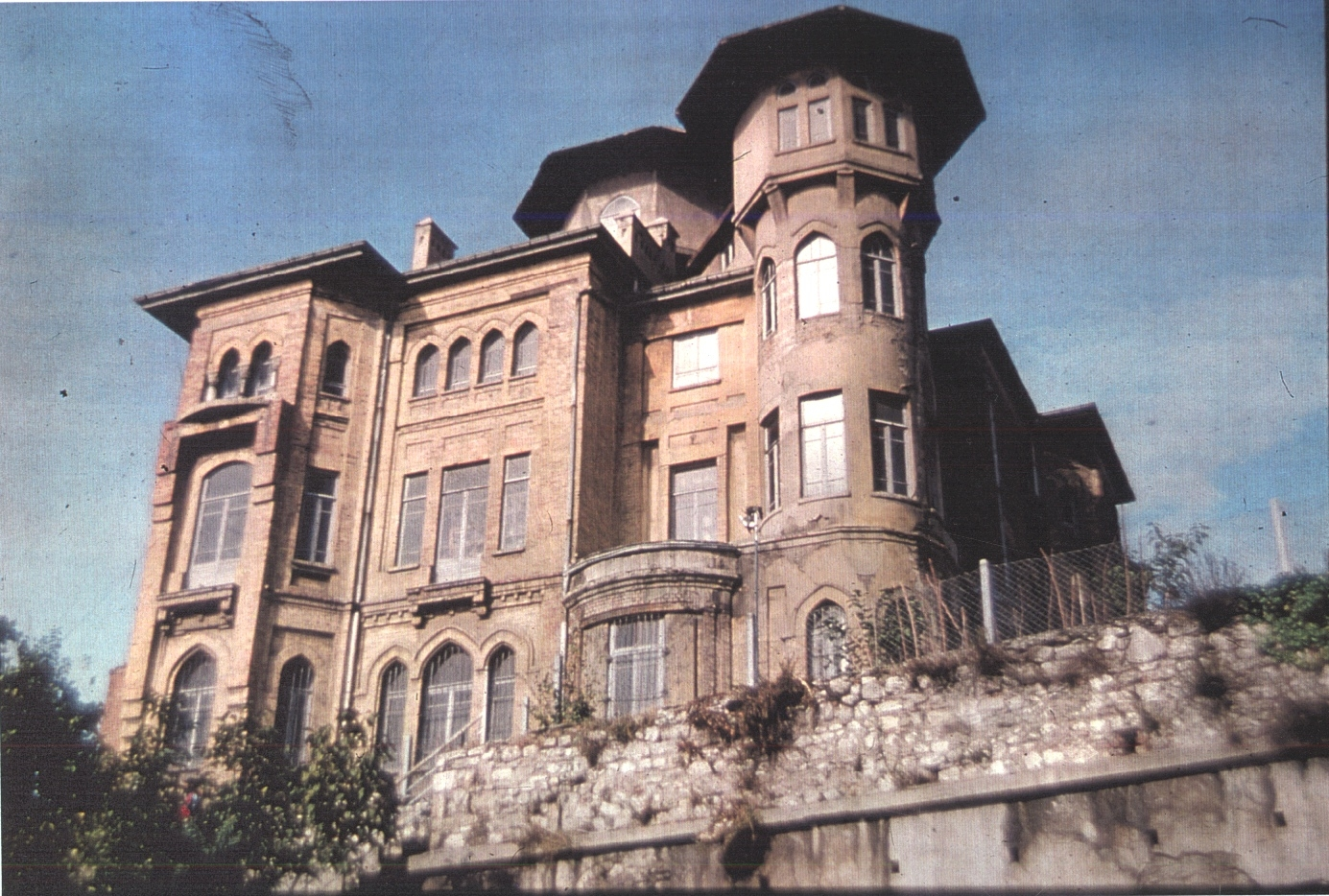
Bulgur Palas in Istanbul

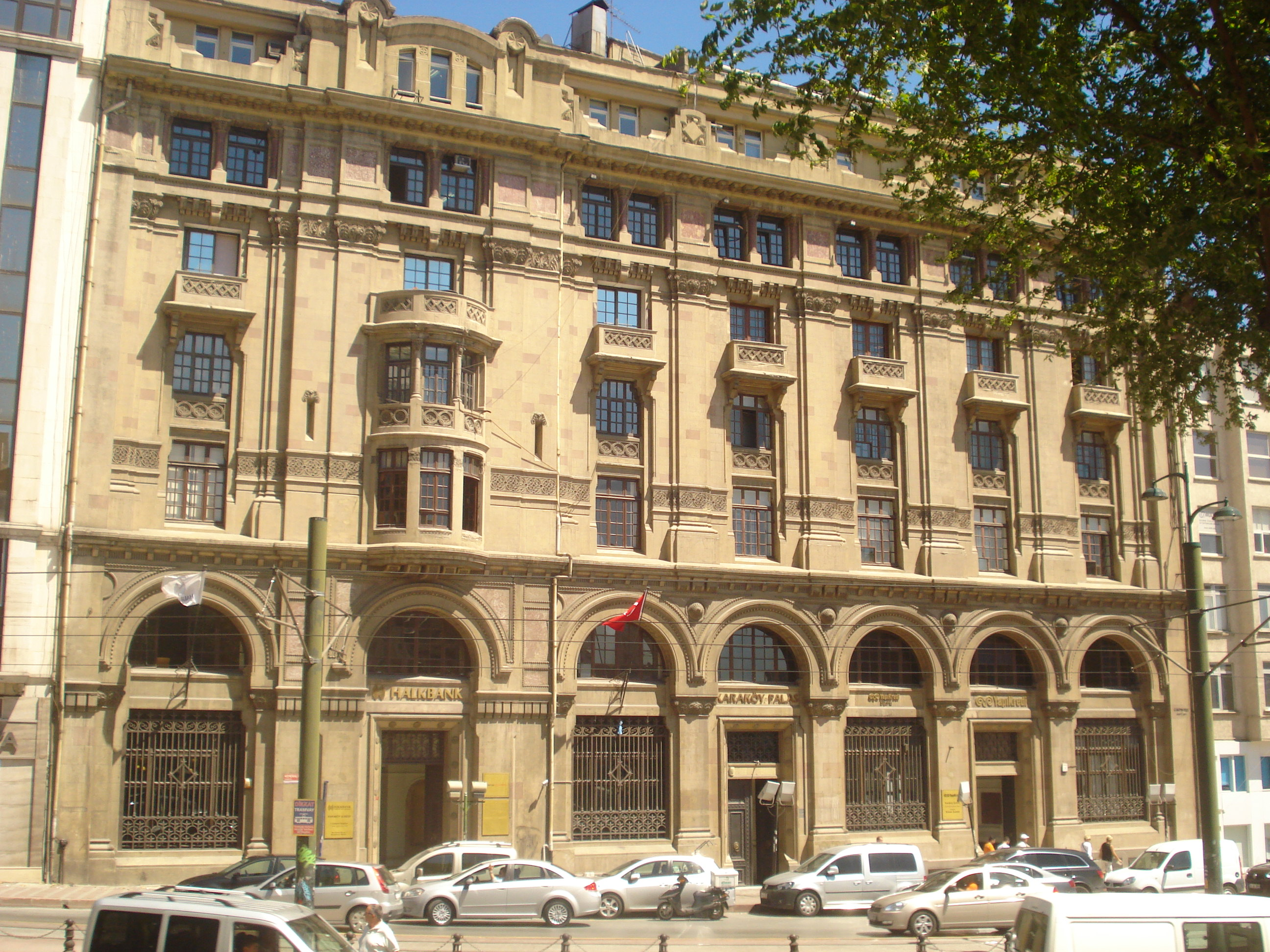
Karaköy Palas in Istanbul.

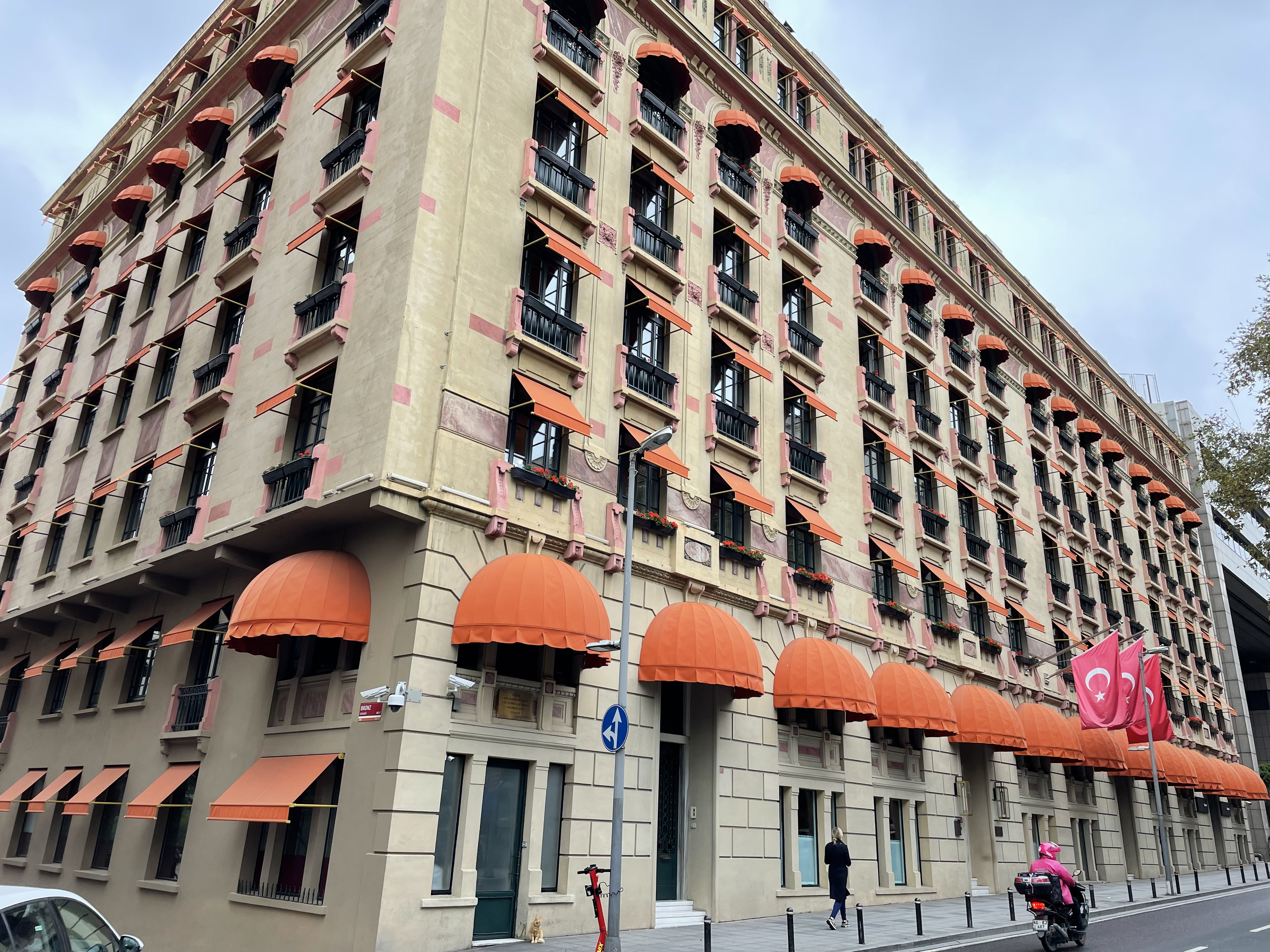
Maçka Palas in Istanbul.

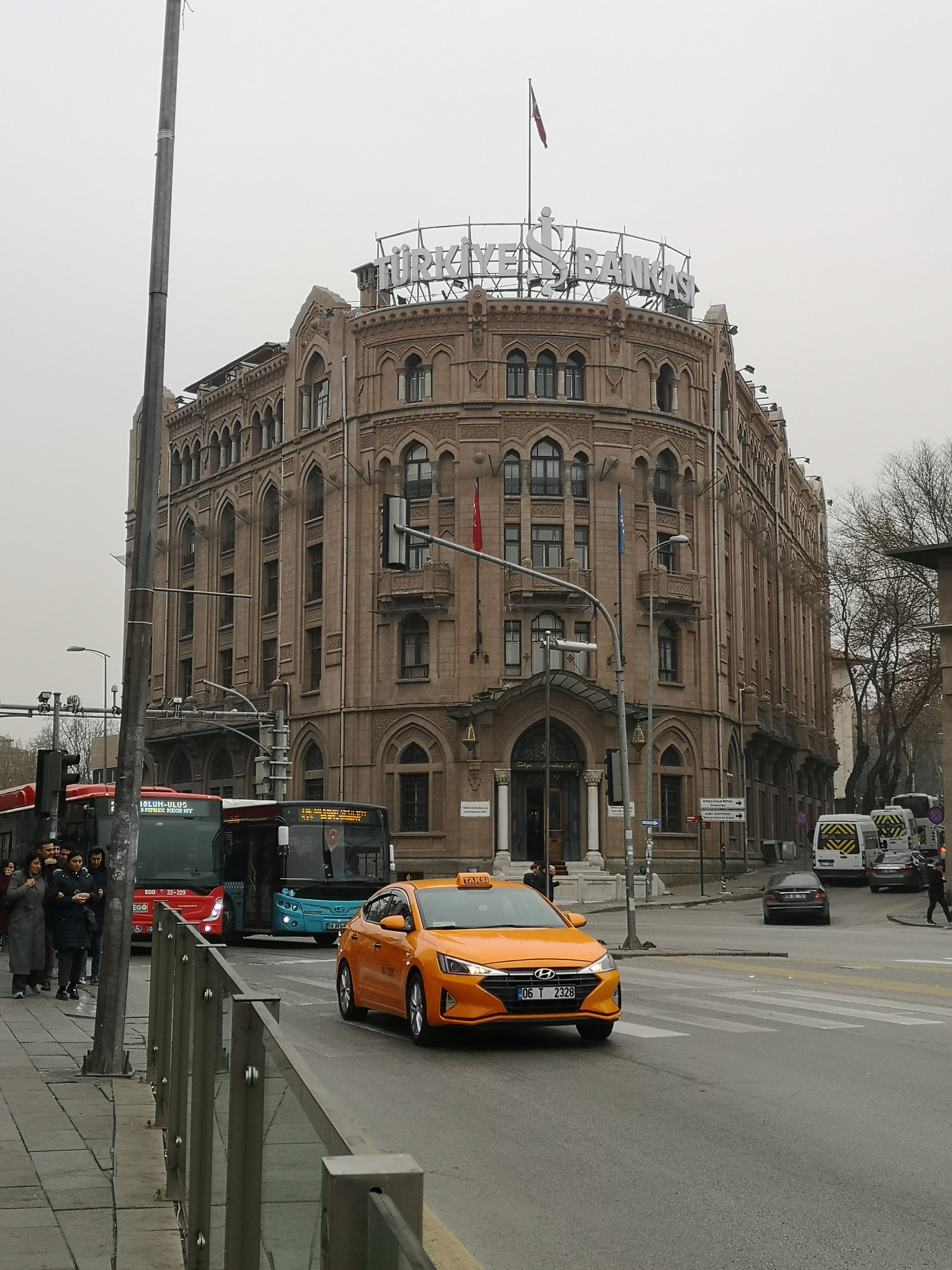
Former İşbank headquarters in Ankara.

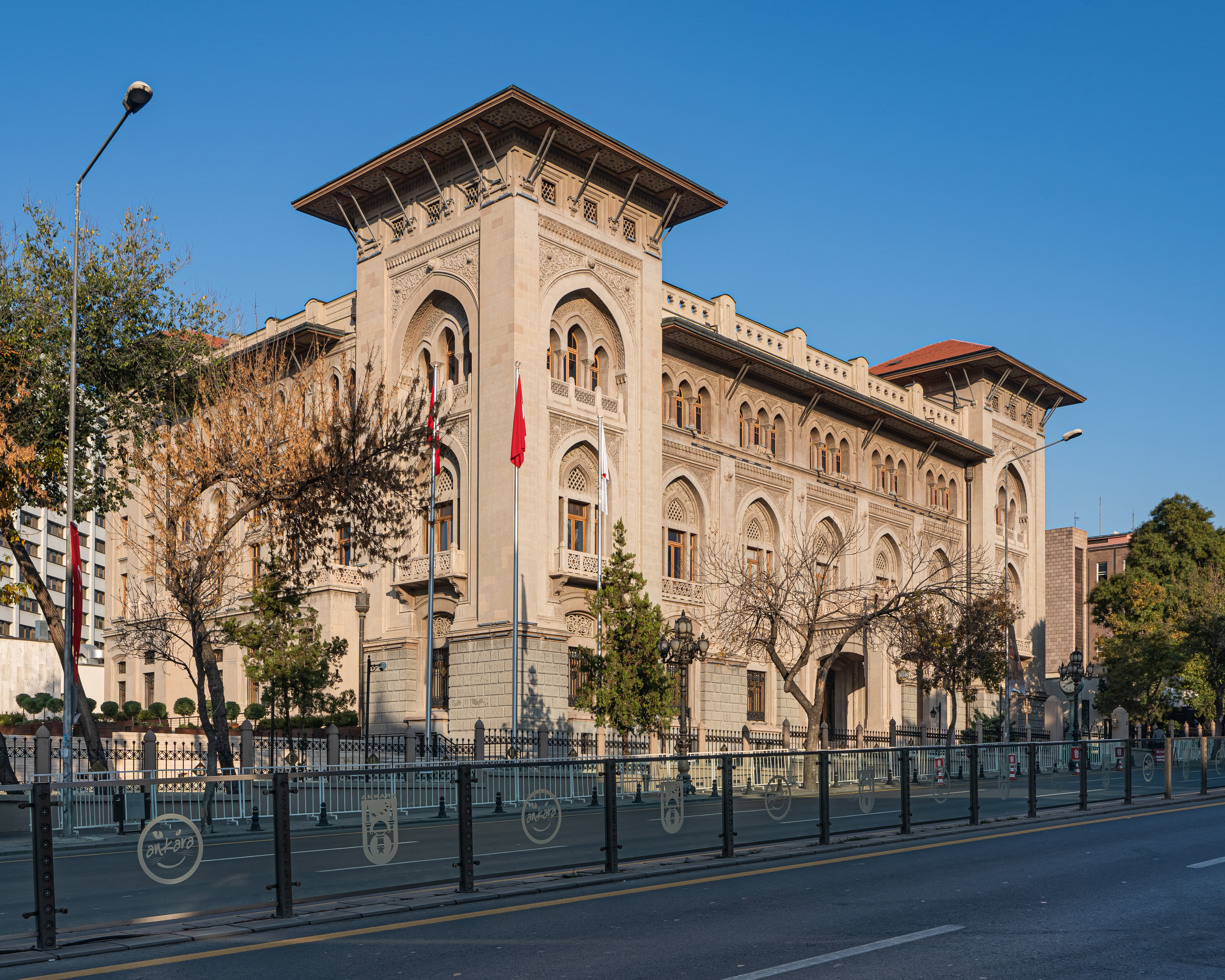
Former Ziraat Bank headquarters i Ankara.

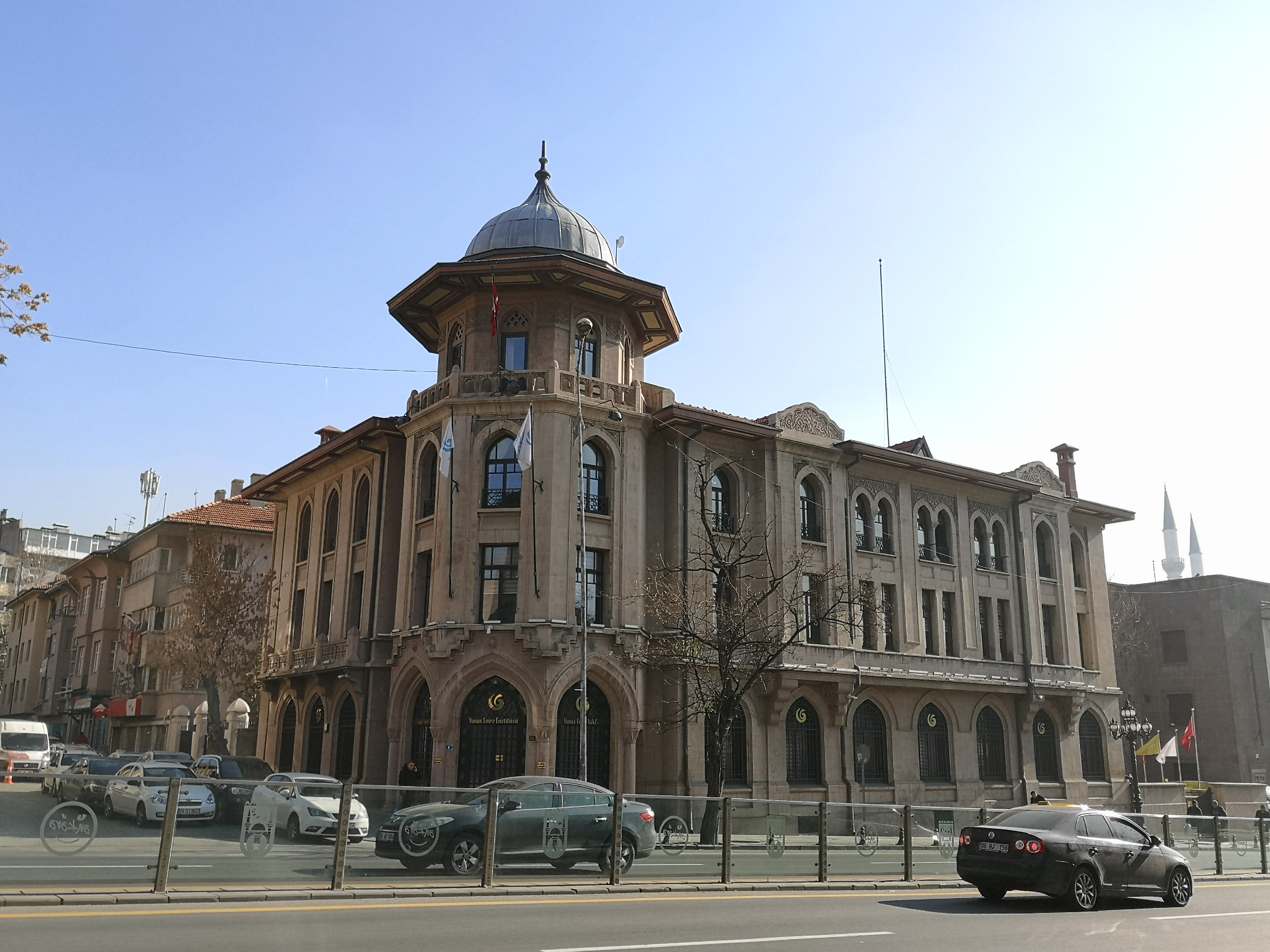
Former Tekel headquarters in Ankara.

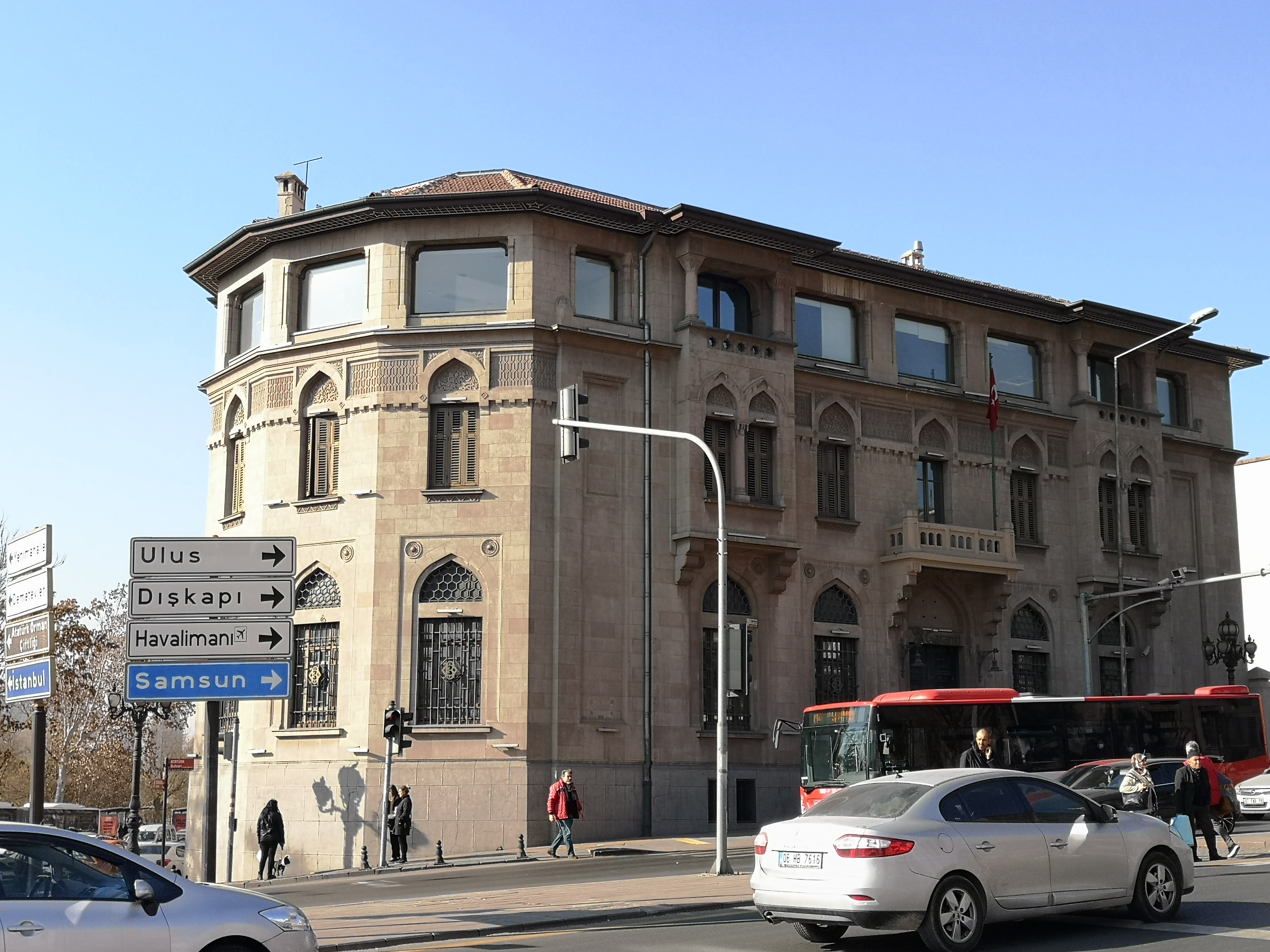
Ottoman Bank office building in Ankara.

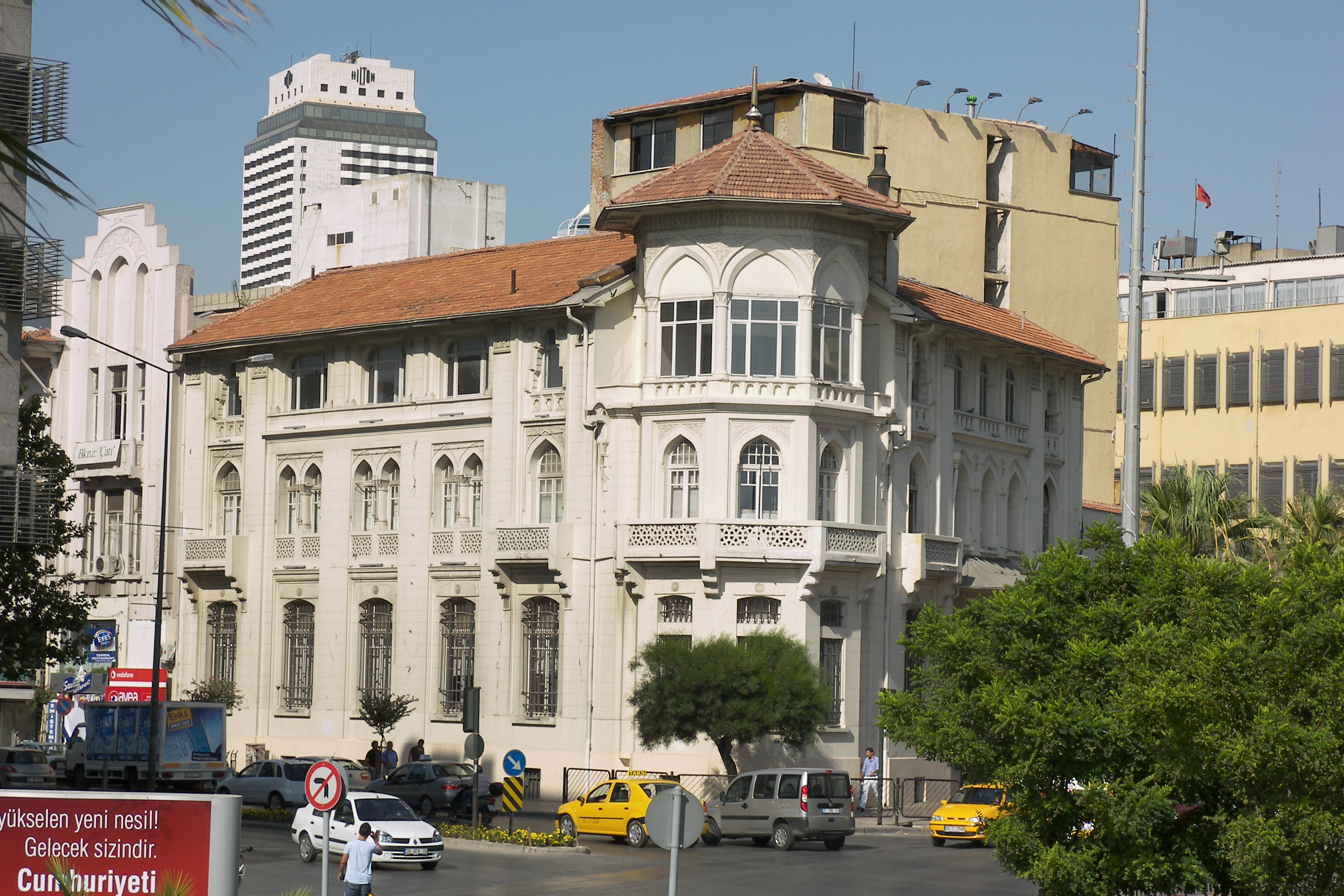
Ottoman Bank office building in İzmir.
