= Statue of Pope John XXIII =

Sculpture in Istanbul, Turkey

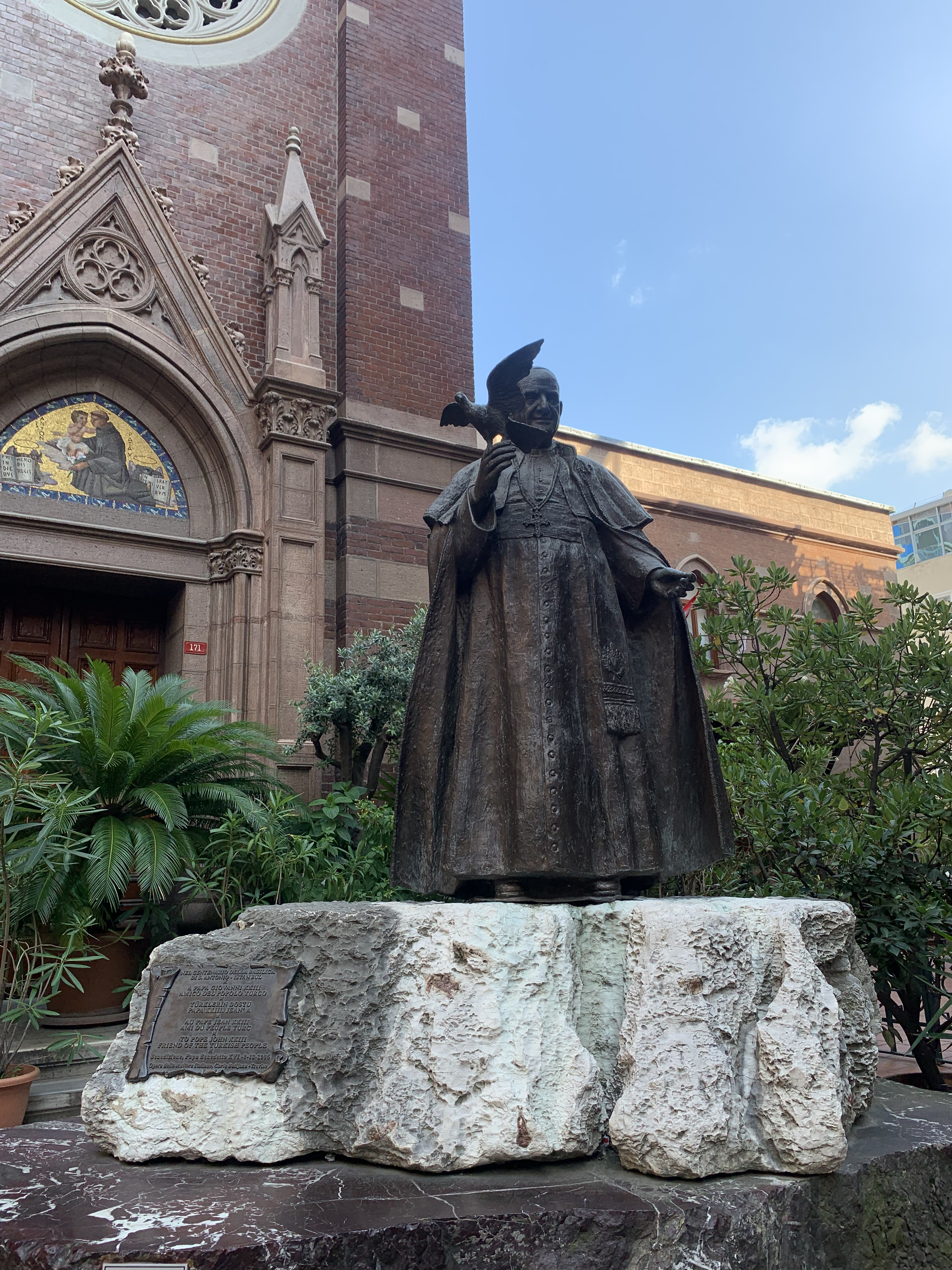
- The statue in 2023
- Year: 2006
- Subject: Pope John XXIII
- Location: Istanbul, Turkey

A statue of Pope John XXIII is installed outside Istanbul's Church of St. Anthony of Padua, in Turkey.

== History ==
The statue was made in Italy and first erected in the garden of the St. Esprit Church in Harbiye, Şişli, unveiled when Pope Benedict XVI visited Istanbul on November 30, 2006. It was later relocated to the Church of St. Anthony of Padua. This statue was the second Pope statue to be erected in the garden of the Saint Esprit Church, after the statue of Pope Benedict XV, which was erected in 1921.

== Pope John XXIII and Turkey ==
Pope John XXIII was the unofficial Vatican representative in Istanbul between 1935 and 1944 and is considered by some the "Turkish pope".

His beatification ceremony in Rome was broadcast live and with a Turkish translation from the Church of St. Anthony, where his statue is located.

== See also ==
- 2006 in art
- List of public art in Istanbul
- Pope Benedict XVI and Islam
