= Church of Saint Anthony of Padua, Istanbul =

Coordinates: 41.0325°N 28.9764°E

Church of St. Anthony of Padua
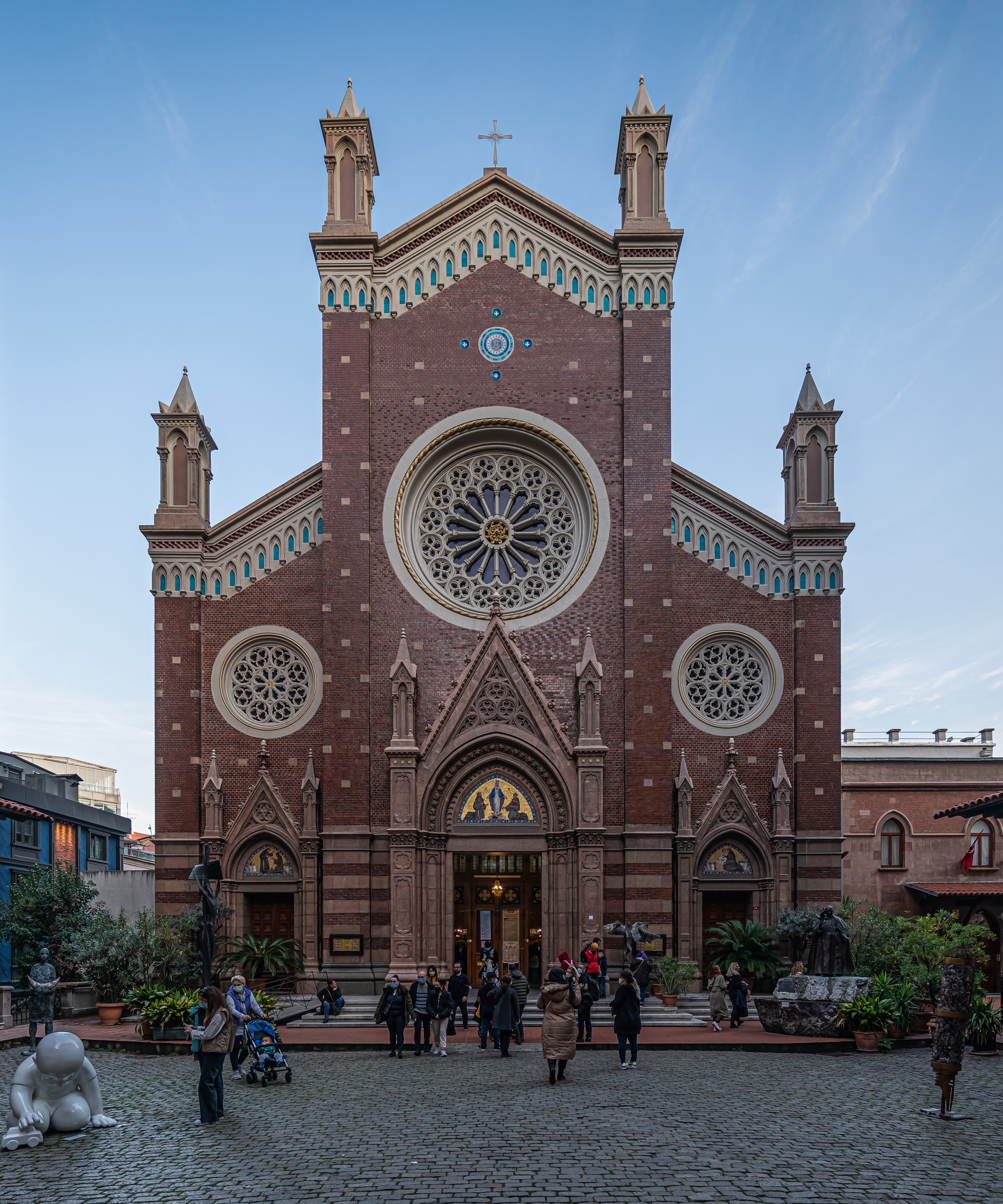
- Location: Beyoğlu, Istanbul
- Country: Turkey
- Denomination: Roman Catholic

Architecture
- Architect: Giulio Mongeri
- Style: Neo-Gothic
- Groundbreaking: 1906
- Completed: 1912

The Church of St. Anthony of Padua (Turkish: Sent Antuan Kilisesi), alternatively known as Sant'Antonio di Padova Church or S. Antonio di Padova, is the largest Catholic church in Istanbul, Turkey. It is located on İstiklal Avenue in the Beyoğlu district.

Together with the churches of St. Mary Draperis (also on İstiklal Avenue), and of SS. Peter and Paul in Galata, it was one of three Levantine parishes in Beyoğlu. Today it is run by Italian priests. Saturday Mass in English begins at 19:00; Sunday Mass in Italian is at 11:30, in Polish at 11:30 in the crypt, in English at 10:00 and at 19:00 in Turkish; and Tuesday Mass in Turkish begins at 11:00. Weekday Masses are in English at 8:00 and in Turkish at 19:00.

== History ==
The original Church of St. Anthony of Padua was built in 1725 by the Italian community of Istanbul, but was later demolished and replaced with the current building which was constructed on the same site. The current basilican church, along with the adjacent residential buildings (known as the St. Antoine Apartmanları) was built between 1906 and 1912 in Venetian Neo-Gothic style, again by the city's Italian community (mostly made up of people of Genoese and Venetian descent, the community amounted to about 40,000 at the start of the 20th century). The building was designed by the Levantine architect Giulio Mongeri, who also designed other important buildings in Turkey, such as the Maçka Palas in Nişantaşı and the Neo-Byzantine Karaköy Palas bank building in Karaköy (Galata), Istanbul, as well as the first headquarters of the Türkiye İş Bankası in Ankara.

Pope John XXIII preached here for 10 years while he was the Vatican's ambassador to Turkey before being chosen as pope. He is known as "the Turkish Pope" because of his fluency in Turkish and his oft-expressed love for Turkey and for Istanbul in particular. A statue of him is installed in the church's courtyard.

Since 2016 a legal battle has raged over the church which has been put up for sale by a man claiming to act for the site's legal owner. According to news reports, Sebahattin Gök obtained a power of attorney from the owners of the land and then attempted to sell it before lawyers acting on behalf of the Vatican took steps to prevent the sale.

== Gallery ==
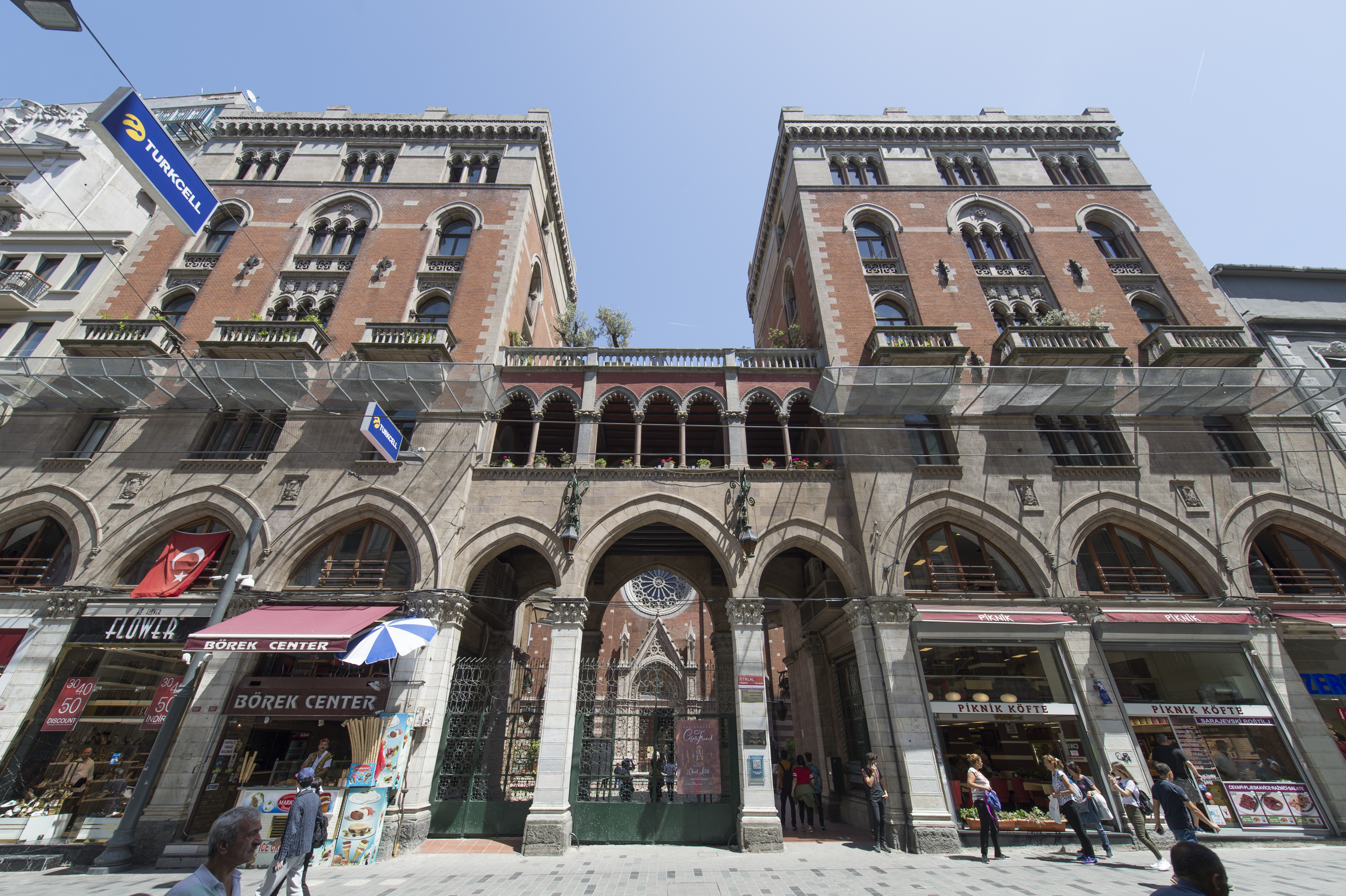
Church of St. Anthony of Padua

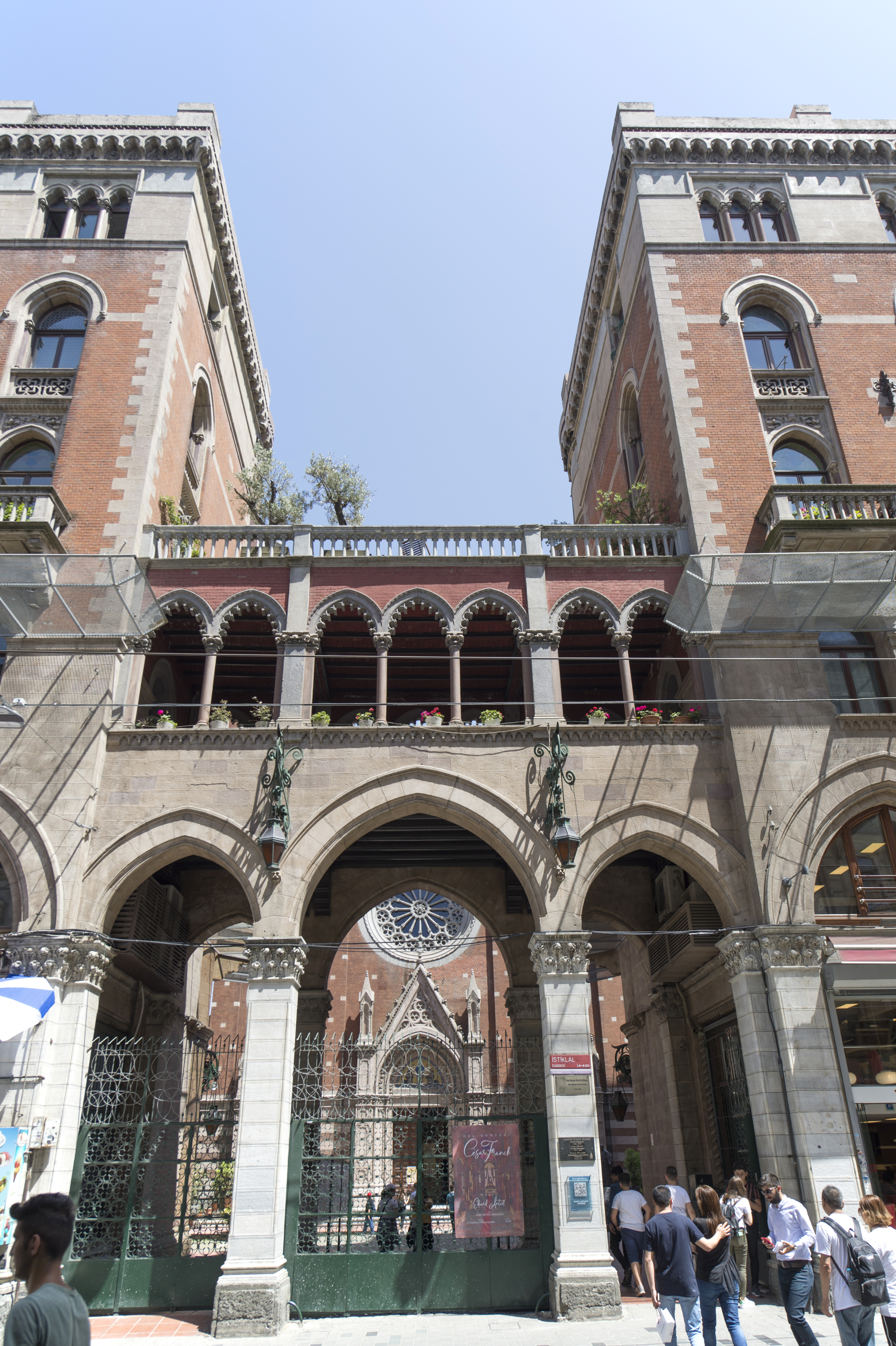
Church of St. Anthony of Padua front of complex

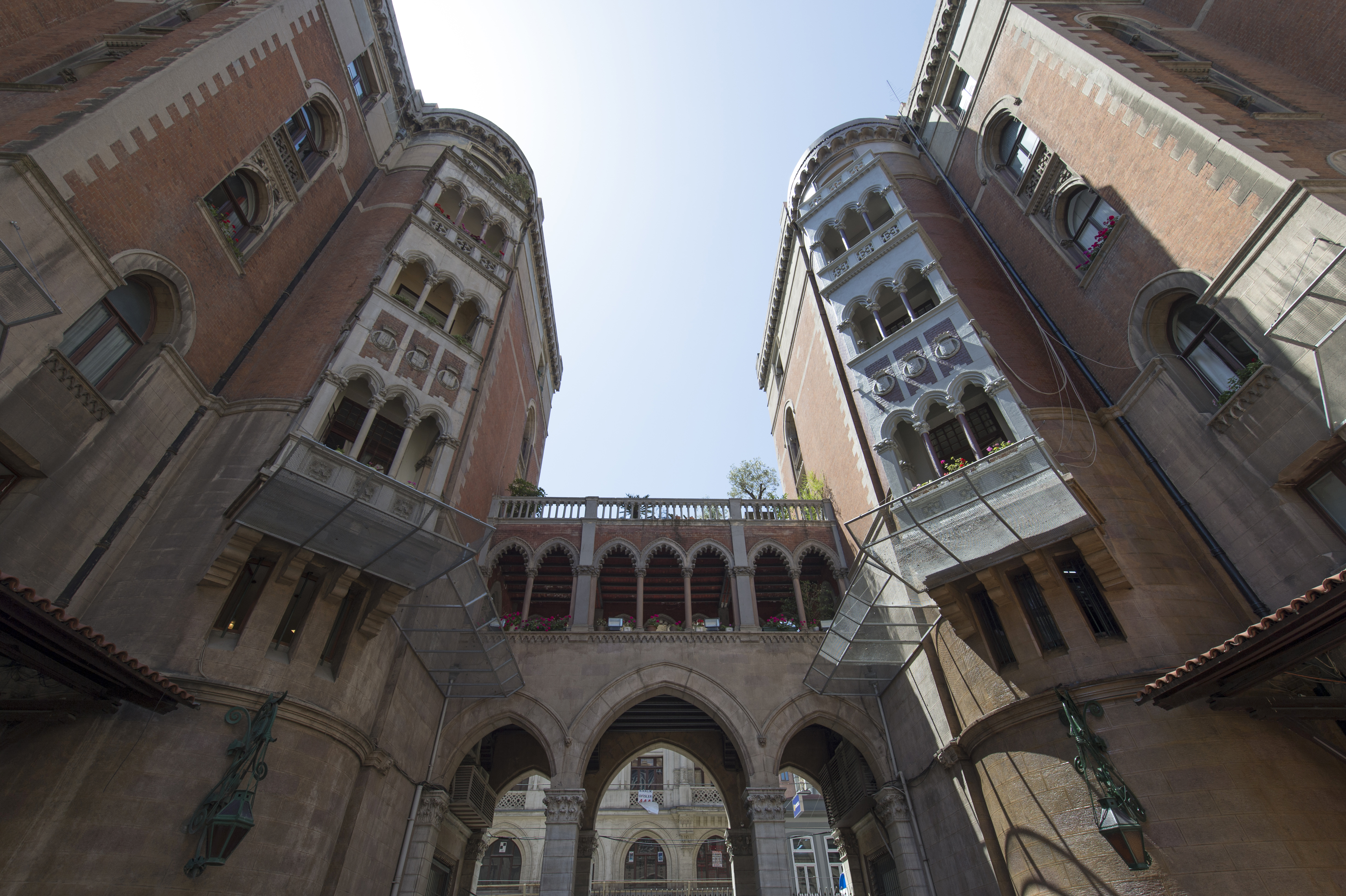
Apartments in front of Church of St. Anthony of Padua

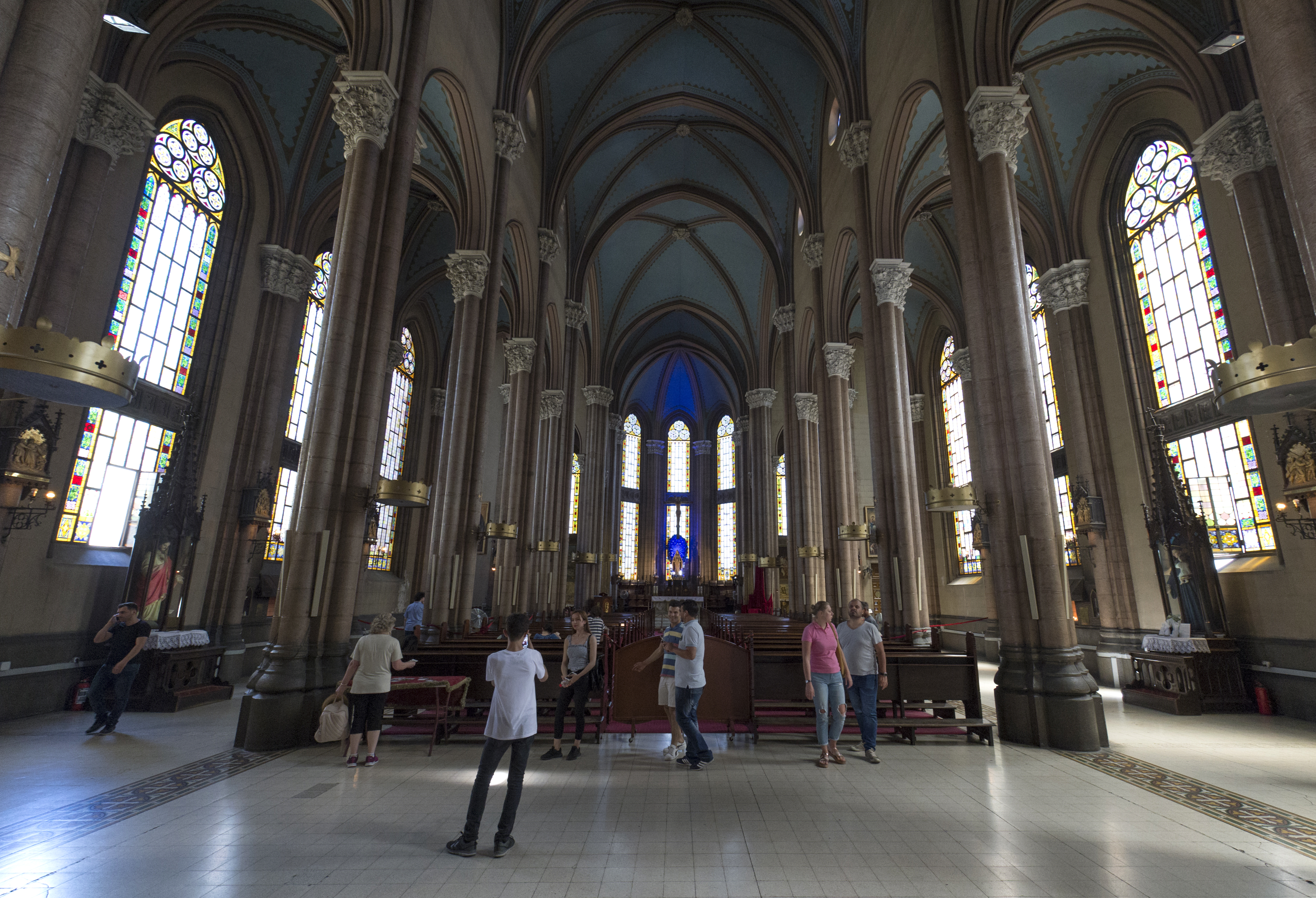
Church of St. Anthony of Padua interior

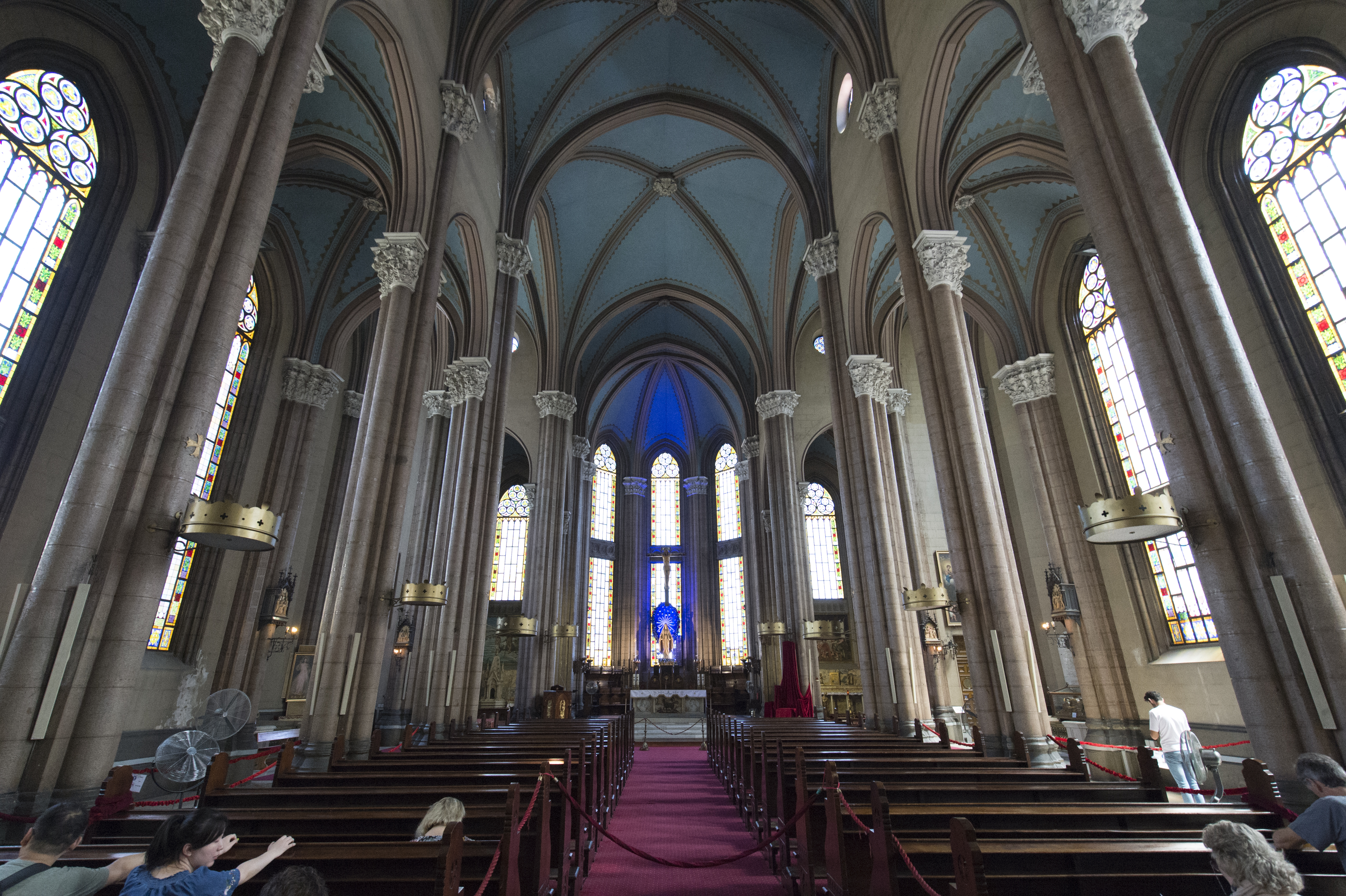
Church of St. Anthony of Padua interior

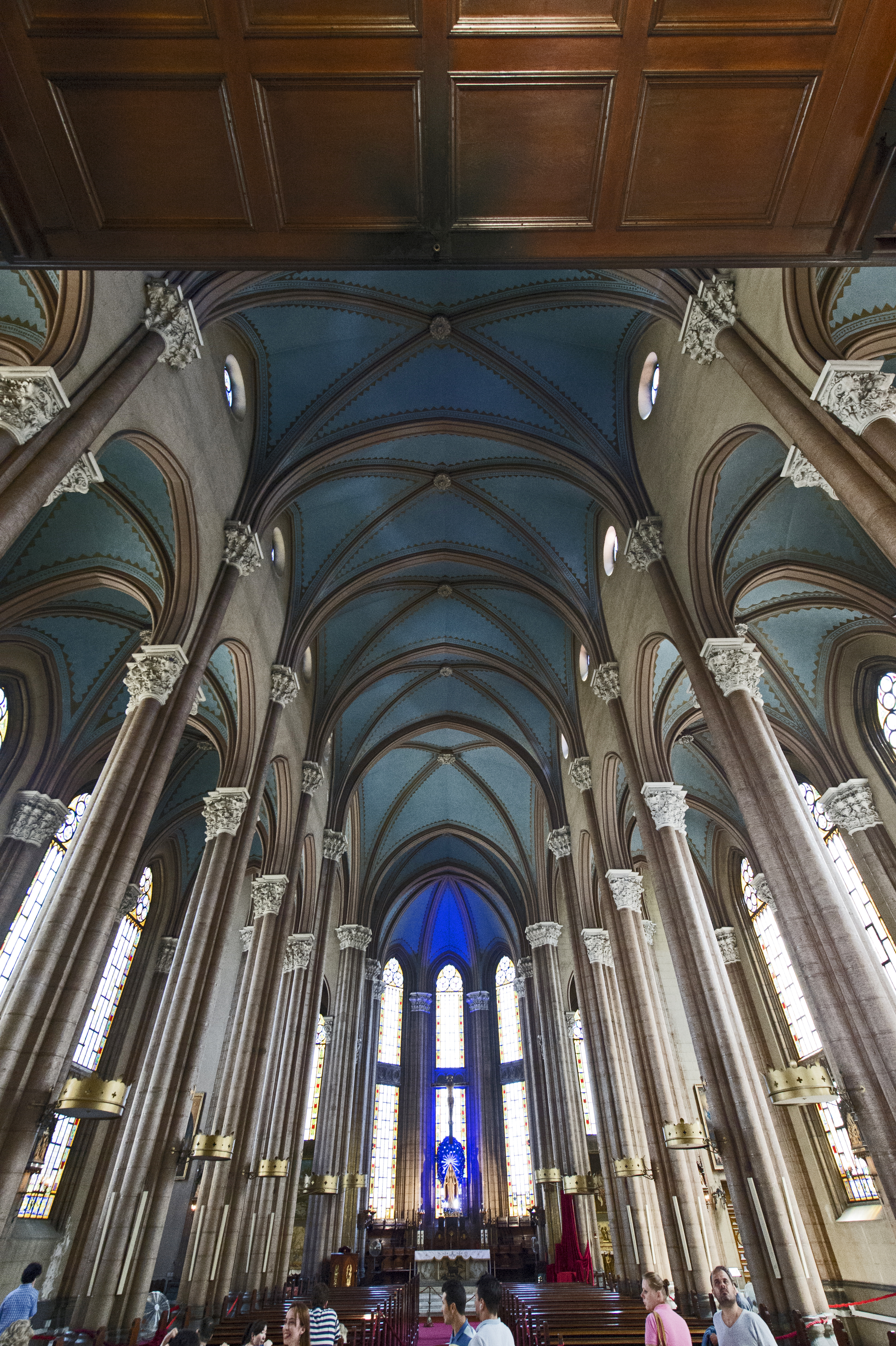
Church of St. Anthony of Padua interior

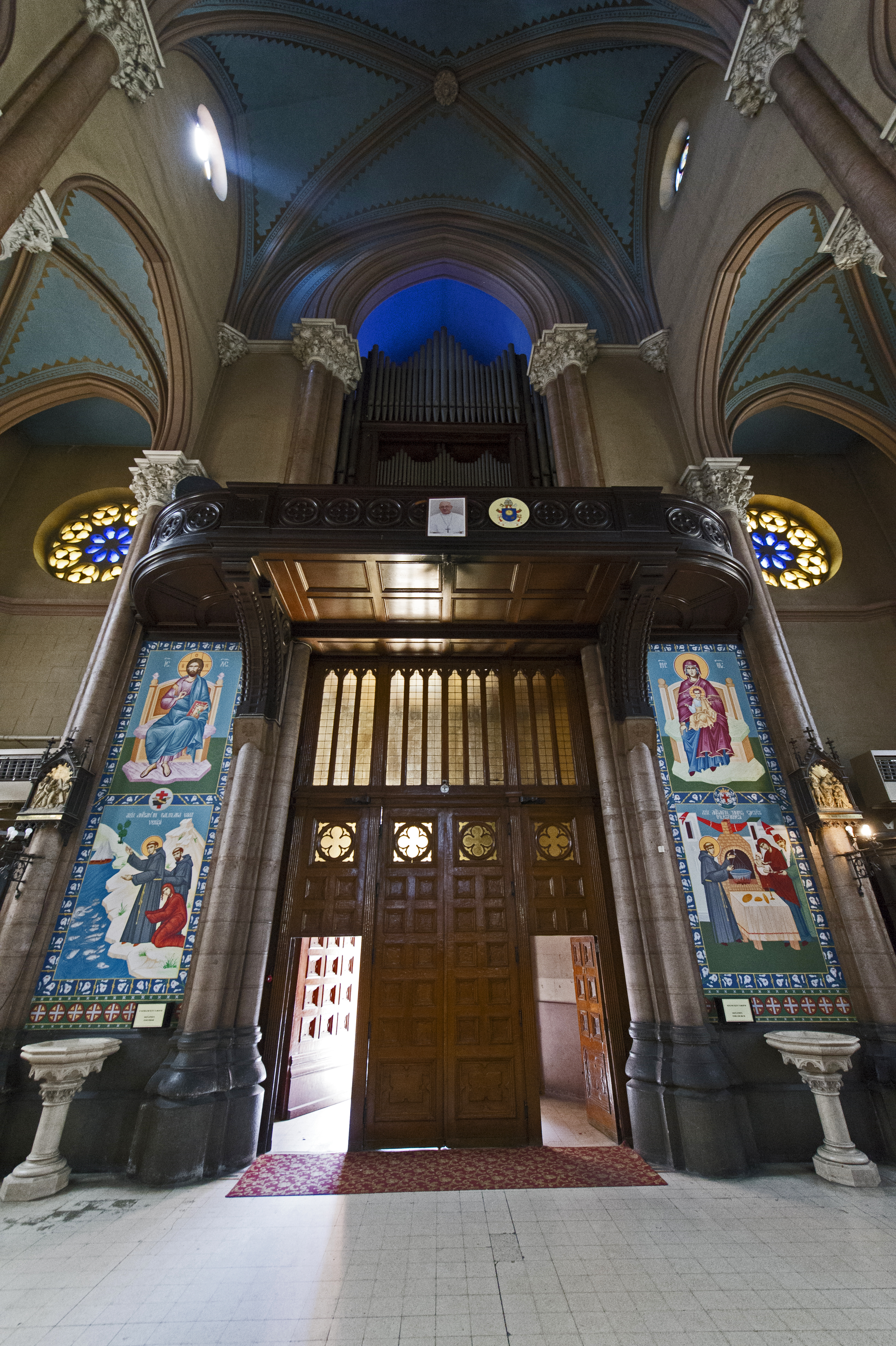
West end of Church of St. Anthony of Padua

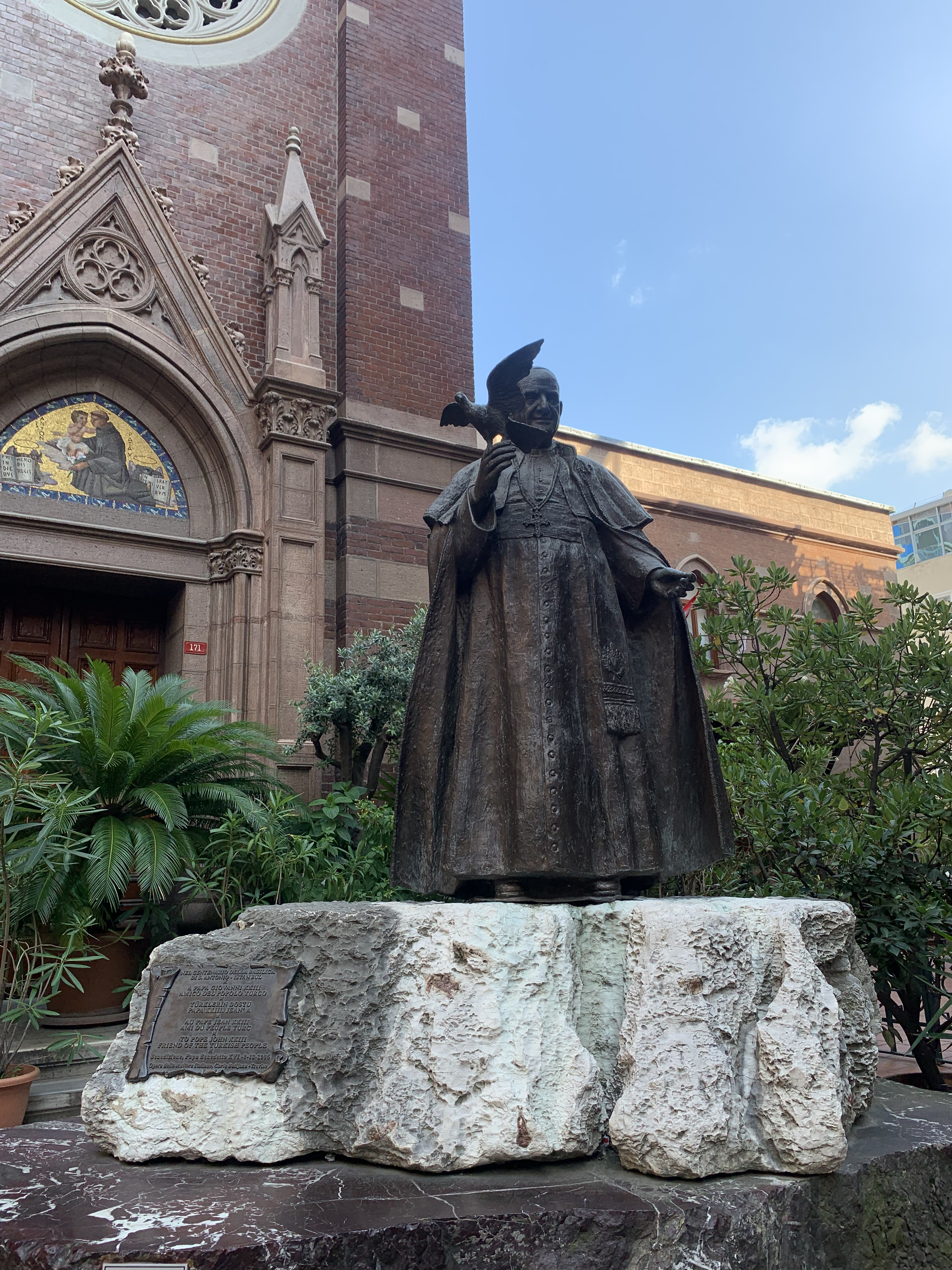
Statue of Pope John XXIII

== See also ==
- Cathedral of the Holy Spirit, Istanbul
- Hagia Triada Church, Istanbul
- Taksim Mosque
- Levantines (Latin Christians)
