= Sankt Georg =

Sankt Georg may refer to:

- SMS Sankt Georg, Austro-Hungarian cruiser
- St. Georg, Hamburg, quarter of the German city Hamburg
- St. George's Austrian High School (Turkish: Sankt Georg Avusturya Lisesi), Turkish school
