= St. George's Catholic Church, Istanbul =

Church in Beyoğlu, Istanbul

Coordinates: 41°01′28″N 28°58′24″E

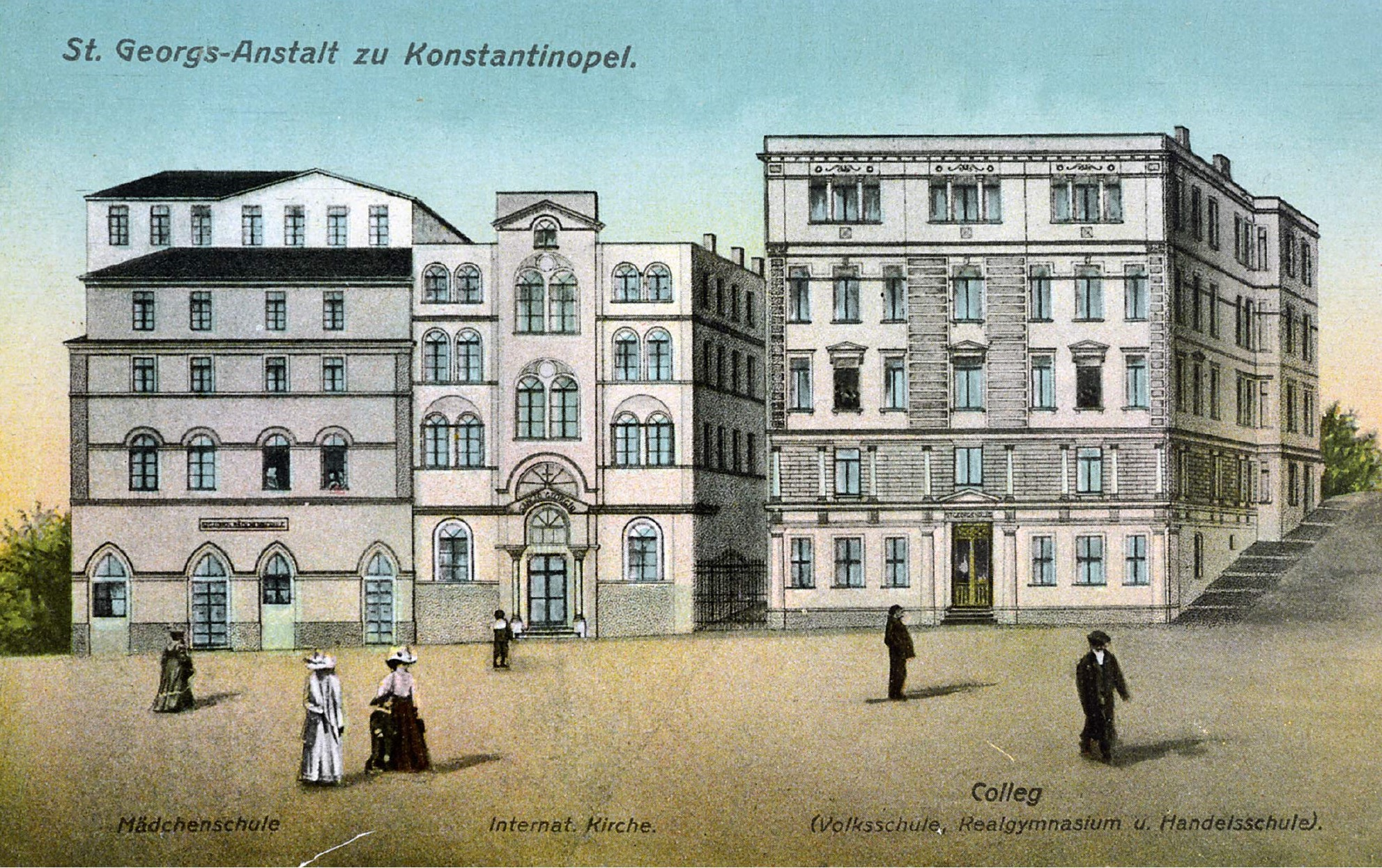
Saint George church (center) in an illustration of 1900

The Catholic church of Saint George (Turkish: Aya Yorgī or Sān Corcī) is a church in the Beyoğlu neighborhood of Istanbul. Dating back at least to 1303, it was rebuilt several times and is now part of St. George's Austrian High School.

== Overview ==
The origins of the church are debated and possibly very ancient. The first document referring to a church dedicated to Saint George in the neighborhood is a 1303 act of Andronikos II Palaiologos which suggests that it was probably Greek Orthodox at the time. Later in the 14th century, John V Palaiologos ceded it to the Genoese colony of Constantinople to serve as its cathedral, as Saint George was the patron saint of the Republic of Genoa. The church deferred to the church of Saint Michael, however, for the celebration of the national and patronal feast days.

The Saint George Church was subsequently in the care of the Dominican Order. In the late 1450s, a few years after the fall of Constantinople, Mehmed II transferred its ownership to the waqf of Ayasofya Mosque. In the early 17C, it went through several different transitions until French ambassador Philippe de Harlay attributed it in 1626 to the Order of Friars Minor Capuchin, which operated a small friary adjacent to the church itself. With support from fellow Capuchin François Leclerc du Tremblay, they purchased a larger building in 1637-1640 with money allocated by the French monarchy, then expanded further in 1651 then in 1670. The church and friary were damaged by fire in 1639, 1660 and 1696, and subsequently rebuilt. In contrast to relatively light damages in 1639, the 1660 fire, which happened three months before the separate Great Fire of 1660 on the other side of the Golden Horn, destroyed the church entirely. The process to gain permission to rebuild was lengthy and was resolved by a specific clause of the 1673 capitulation. The church was consecrated again on 6 January 1677.

In 1628, the Capuchins opened a small school at the facility, teaching the catechism, languages (including French, Italian, Latin, Ottoman Turkish, Greek and Armenian), and arithmetic to local Latin Catholic, Greek and Armenian children. In 1689, they also founded a hospital for individuals of all religions. In the early 18C, masses in the church were said on behalf of both the French ambassador and the Venetian Bailo. Another fire damaged the church in 1731. For most of the 18C, Saint George was one of three churches in Galata under French protection, the other two being Saint Benoit (held by the Jesuits) and Saints Peter and Paul (Dominicans).

In 1783, the Apostolic Vicar purchased the property from the Capuchins on behalf of the Sacred Congregation de Propaganda Fide, and it served as the Apostolic Vicar's residence until the latter's relocation in 1802. The Franciscan Province of Bosna Srebrena then purchased it from the Vicariate in 1853, and maintained a hospital there mostly for sailors of the Austro-Hungarian Navy. In 1882, Lazarists from Austria-Hungary in turn took over the facility from the Bosnian Franciscans, and made it a primary school and orphanage for German-speaking Catholic children. The Lazarists later added middle and high school sections, and the first high school cohort graduated in 1913. The church has remained under their care since then.

== See also ==
- Church of Saint Mary Draperis, Istanbul
- Cathedral of the Holy Spirit, Istanbul
