= Aşıklı Höyük =

Neolithic archaeological site near Aksaray, Turkey

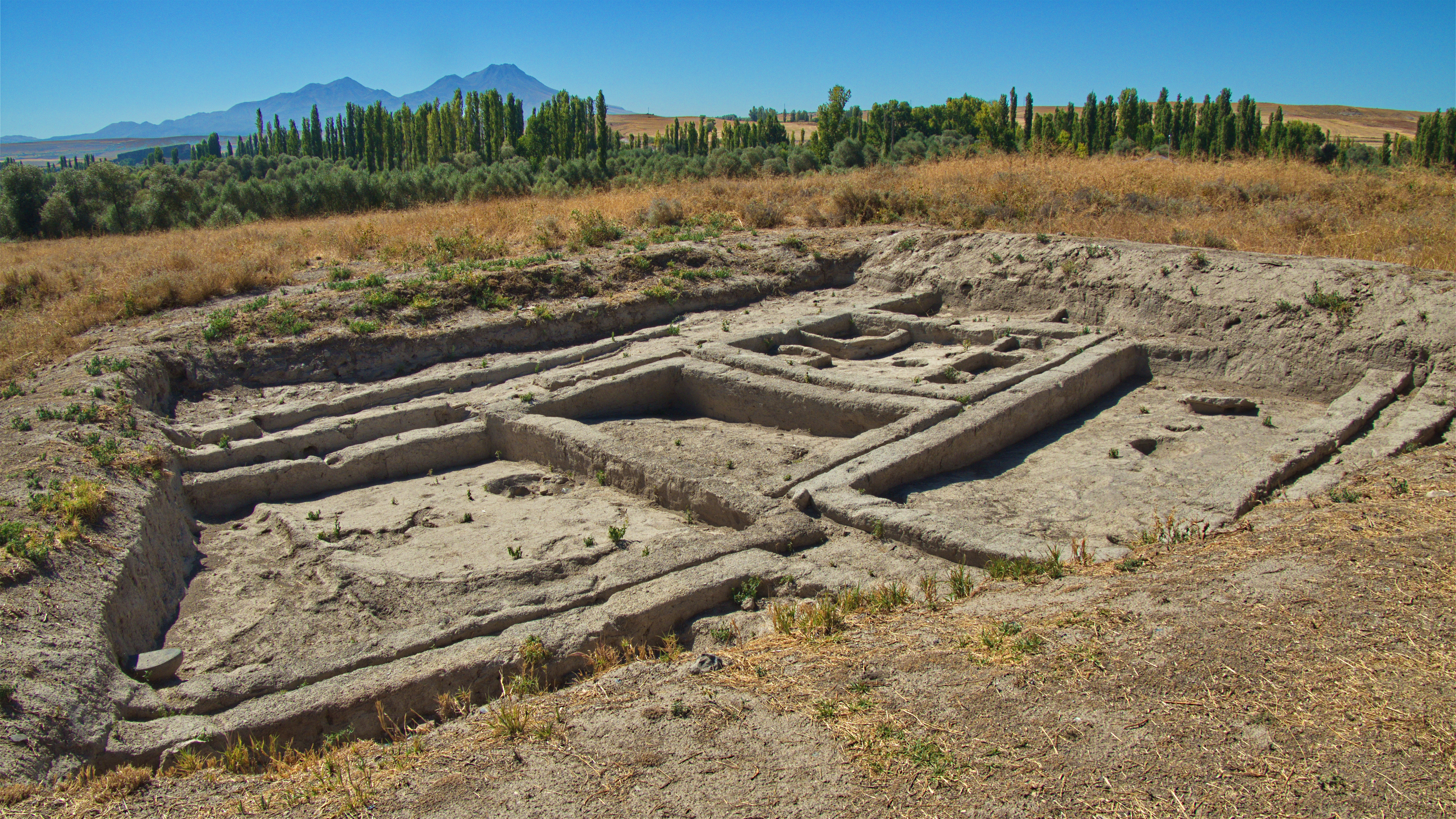
- Aşıklı Höyük Excavations

- Location within Turkey Location within Near East
- 38°20′56″N 34°13′48″E
- Type: Settlement
- Periods: Pre-Pottery Neolithic
- Location: Aksaray Province, Turkey

History
- Built: 8,200 BC

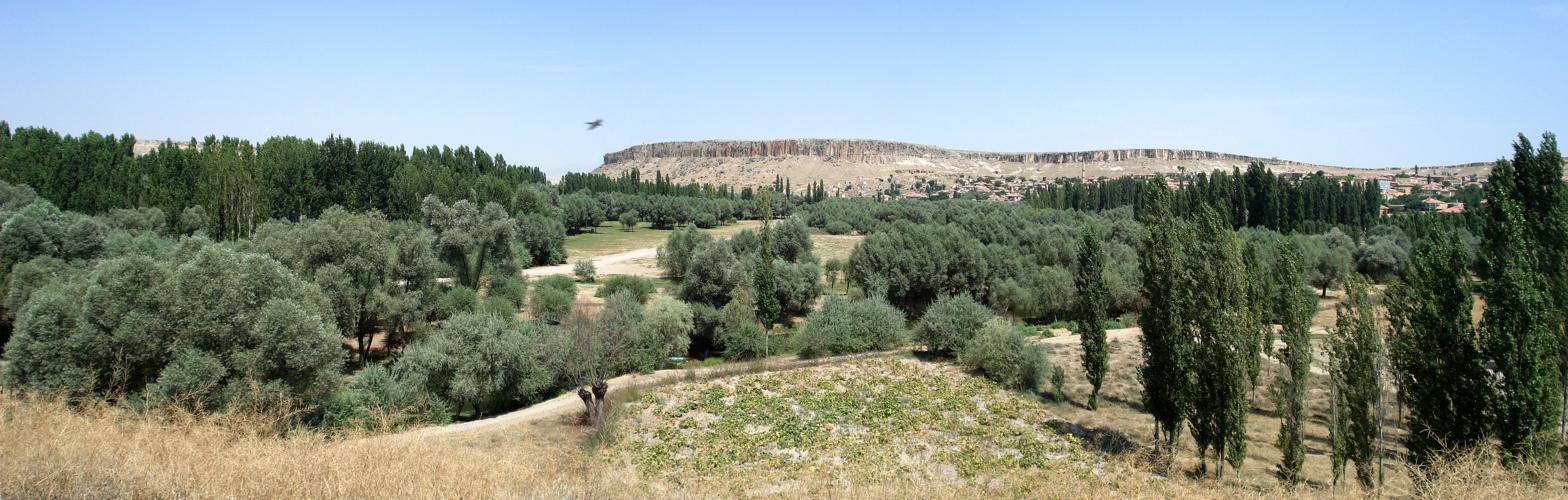
Panorama made from top of the mound, facing north-west

Aşıklı Höyük is a settlement mound located nearly 1 kilometre (0.62 mi) south of Kızılkaya village on the bank of the Melendiz brook, and 25 km (16 mi) southeast of Aksaray, Turkey. Aşıklı Höyük is located in an area covered by the volcanic tuff of central Cappadocia, in Aksaray Province. The archaeological site of Aşıklı Höyük was first settled in the Pre-Pottery Neolithic period, around 8,200 BC.

It is situated 1,119.5 metres (3,673 ft) above sea level, a little higher than the region's average of c. 1,000 metres (3,300 ft). The site itself is about 4 hectares (9.9 acres), considerably smaller than the closely situated site of Çatalhöyük (13 ha (32 acres)). The surrounding landscape is formed by erosion of river valleys into tuff deposits. The Melendiz Valley, where the Aşıklı Höyük is located, constitutes a favourable, fertile, and diverse habitat. The proximity to an obsidian source did become the base of a trade with the material supplying areas as far away as today's Cyprus and Iraq.

== Site history ==
Area of the Fertile Crescent, circa 7500 BC, with main sites. Aşıklı Höyük, near Çatalhöyük, was one of the foremost sites of the Pre-Pottery Neolithic period. The area of Mesopotamia proper was not yet settled by humans.

Aşıklı Höyük was first investigated by Professor Ian A. Todd when he visited the site in the summer of 1964. Todd emphasised the importance of the obsidian in the area, based on over 6,000 obsidian pieces collected from the surface layer alone. The site was classified as a medium sized mound and partly destroyed by the river situated next to it. On the basis of the lithics and animal bones located in the surface layers the site became known as a contemporary to the Palestine PPNB, which later was reinforced by ^{14}C dates (based on five unstratified radiocarbon dates going from 7008 ± 130 to 6661 ± 108). The first comprehensive excavations took place relatively late: first when the government launched a plan that would result in the rise of the waters of the Mamasın Lake located close to Aşıklı Höyük, Professor Ufuk Esin (University of Istanbul) started the salvage excavations in 1989. Nine excavations have been undertaken up to 2003, uncovering approximately 4,200 square metres (45,000 sq ft) on the horizontal plain, making it one of the largest scale excavations in the region.

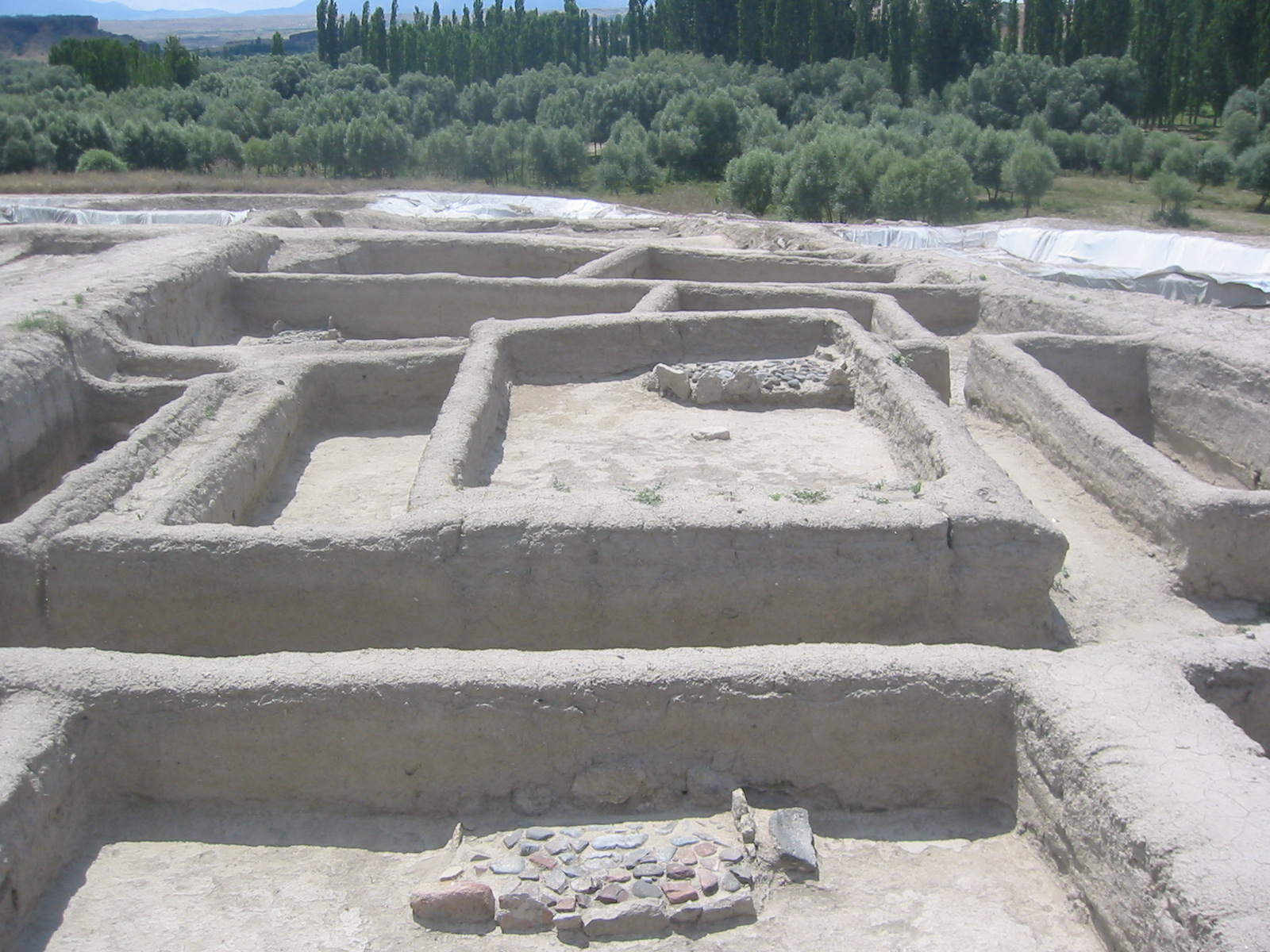
Aşıklı Höyük excavations in 2009

== Dates ==
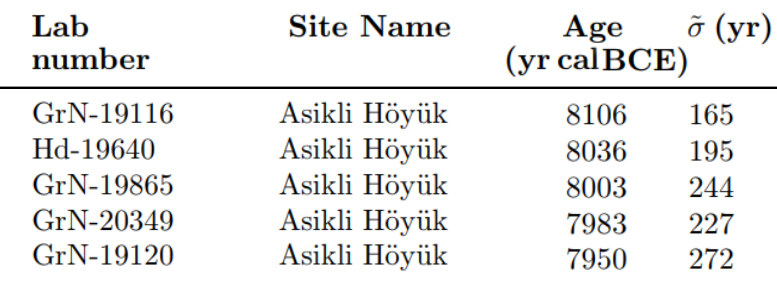
Earliest calibrated Carbon 14 dates for Aşıklı Höyük as of 2013.

The newest dates for Aşıklı Höyük show that the occupational period was from 8200 to 7400 BC, extracted from 3 layers with a total of 13 phases; which places it in phase ECA II (correlating with the E/MPPNB in the Levant). It is known as one of the earliest Aceramic Neolithic sites on the Anatolian plateau, and the prior mentioned extraction of the obsidian source was likely to be frequented as far back as the Paleolithic nomadic hunter-gatherers. Due to its date and structural organization Aşıklı Höyük is known to be "a prime example of a first foray into sedentism".

== Burials ==
After more than 400 rooms had been excavated, the total number of individual found to have been buried within the settlement did not surpass 70. All these burials were under building floors. The dead were placed in pits cut through the floor during the occupation of the building. The buried are people of both sexes and all ages. There is a variety of skeletal body postures, from burials in a hocker (fetal) position to extended skeletons facing upwards. Others are lying on one side, occasionally with the legs bent at the knees. The orientation of the burials varies within the buildings, as does the number of individuals buried inside them.

The male population had individuals up to the age of 55–57 years of age, while the majority of females died between the ages of 20 and 25. The skeletal remains of these women show spinal deformities indicating that they had to carry heavy loads. This does not itself prove that there was a division of labour between the sexes. The fact that the men seem to have outlived the women might be interpreted as sign that the women were subject to more strenuous physical labour than their male counterparts. From Natufian Abu Hureyra there are similar osteological signs, such as pathologies in metatarsals, phalanges, arm, and shoulder joints, being specific to females resulting from habitual kneeling in the use of saddle querns (grinding stones). The Neolithic evidence show indications of increased physical workload in the osteological material on both genders, where the male skeletons show signs of joint disease and trauma arguably caused by cutting timber and tilling.

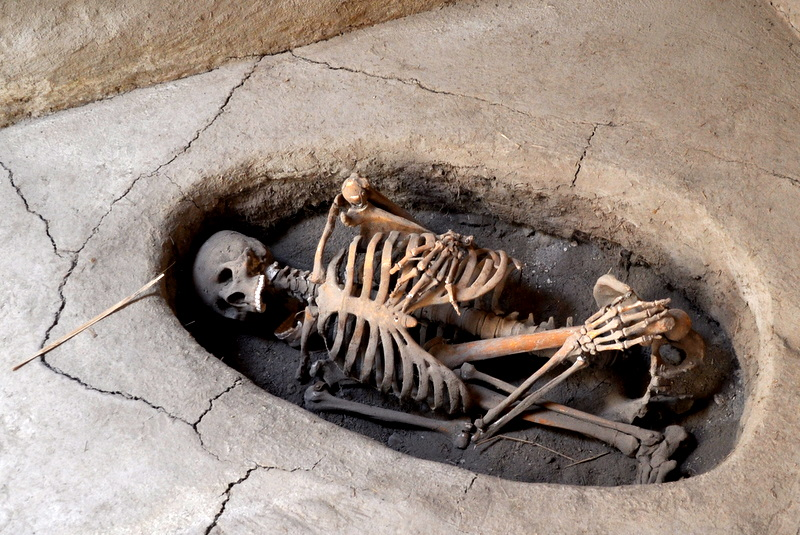
Hocker positioned burial found at Aşıklı Höyük

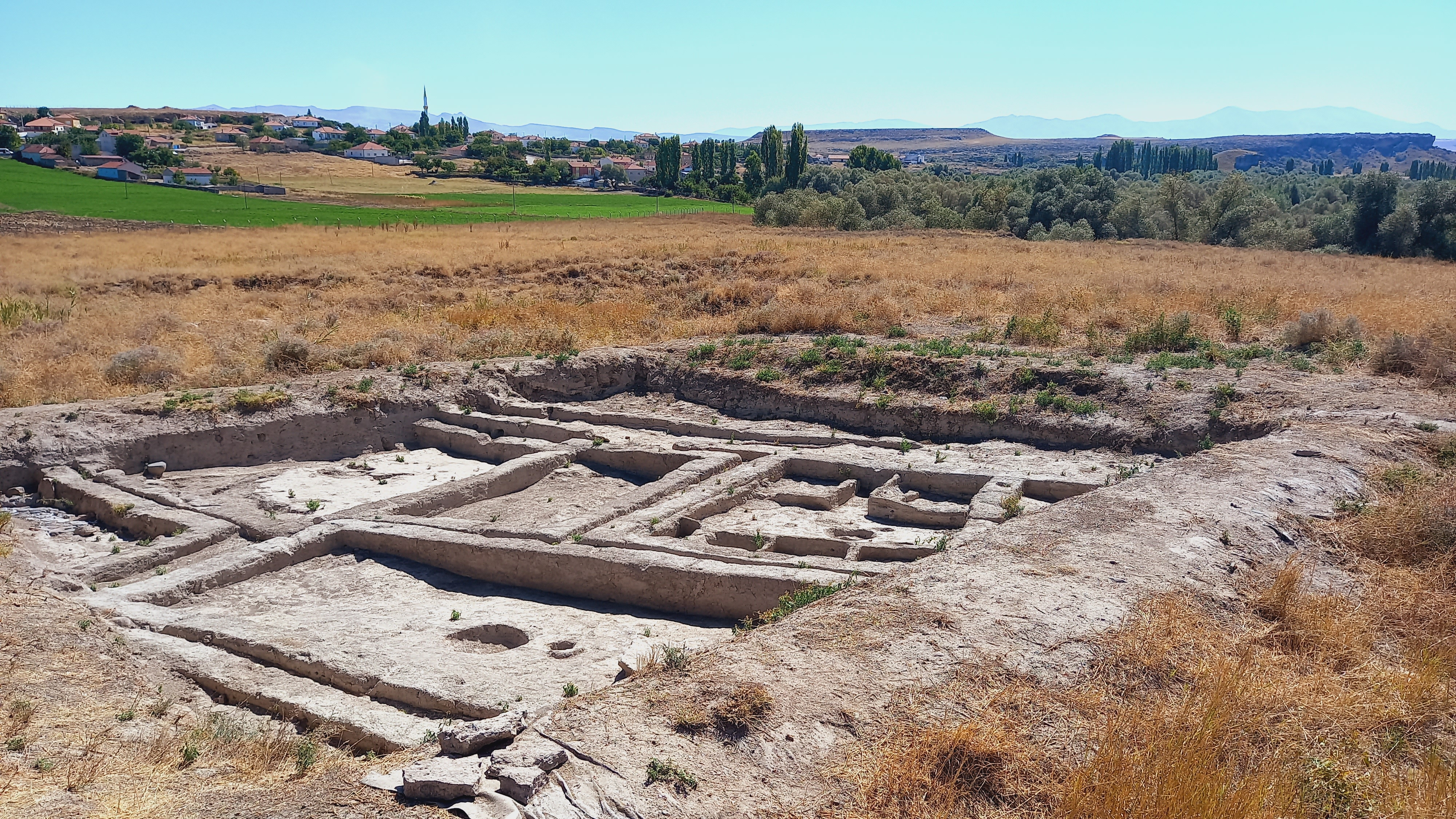
General view of Aşıklı Höyük.

Children represent 37.8% of the deceased, with 43.7% mortality within a year of birth. The skeletal remains are complete and with articulations intact, indicating that the burials have been primary. The graves contain either single or double burials. On one occasion two graves were found under the floor of room AB, belonging to an adjacent court (HG) with a large domed mudbrick oven paved with blocks of basalt. In one of the graves were the skeletons of a young woman and an elderly man; in the other a young woman buried together with her baby. The young woman had apparently undergone trepanation and survived only a few days after the operation. All skeletons were buried in the hocker position, a fetal-like positioning were the arms are embracing the lower limbs. From a different grave a woman shows signs of being scalped immediately after her death, according to the cut marks on her skull. As many as 55% of the skeletons show signs of being burned. The burial under the floor AB is accommodated by walls with the interior side were painted in a purplish red colour. The oven in HG indicates that this was indeed "special individuals of an elite class", claiming it can be compared to the "Terrazzo" Building at Çayönü and the "Temple" Building at Nevalı Çori and therefore have been a shrine used for religious ceremonies. Many of the burials contain burial goods consisting of necklaces and bracelets made of beads of various sorts.

70 burials in over 400 rooms suggest that some form of selection took place of who was buried at the site, implying that AB indeed could be the residence or resting place of people influential in terms of both economy and political power. Rooms containing hearths are more likely to contain burials; as many as 77%. It has been argued that the number of burials could be an underrepresentation inhered at the site, since a large part of the settlement remain unexcavated beneath the baulks. Later excavations which have been published suggest on the other hand that burials were not a general feature at Aşıklı Höyük and therefore the suggestions of burials being a privilege of the elite class do seem plausible. There has not been found a cemetery or any other sign of where the rest of the population might have been disposed of post mortem. This issue is not only limited to Aşıklı Höyük: there is also a lack of cemeteries on the PPNB "mega-sites" in the Levant, such Ayn Ghazal (archaeological site) in the Jordan Valley.

It seems that in Aşıklı Höyük, as in the rest of the Anatolian and Levantine area, the burial and any other post mortem treatment was arguably an "upper class" phenomenon. This interpretation has been opposed, referring to the diversity of individuals in both sex and age in the graves. The burials including such a wide range of individuals do not directly coherent with the image of an "upper class" phenomenon. Burials could have been removed or replaced over time, giving a wrong image of the burials as belonging to the elite. An alternative perspective has been suggested: "the Neolithic dead are not under-represented: rather, it is the architecture in settlements that are over-represented", meaning that in many cases archaeologists have drastically overestimated the extent to which all areas of Neolithic sites were occupied simultaneously. As for Aşıklı Höyük and other sites in the area: low numbers of burials in comparison with occupation span does not directly indicate a cult of the elite.

== Hearths ==
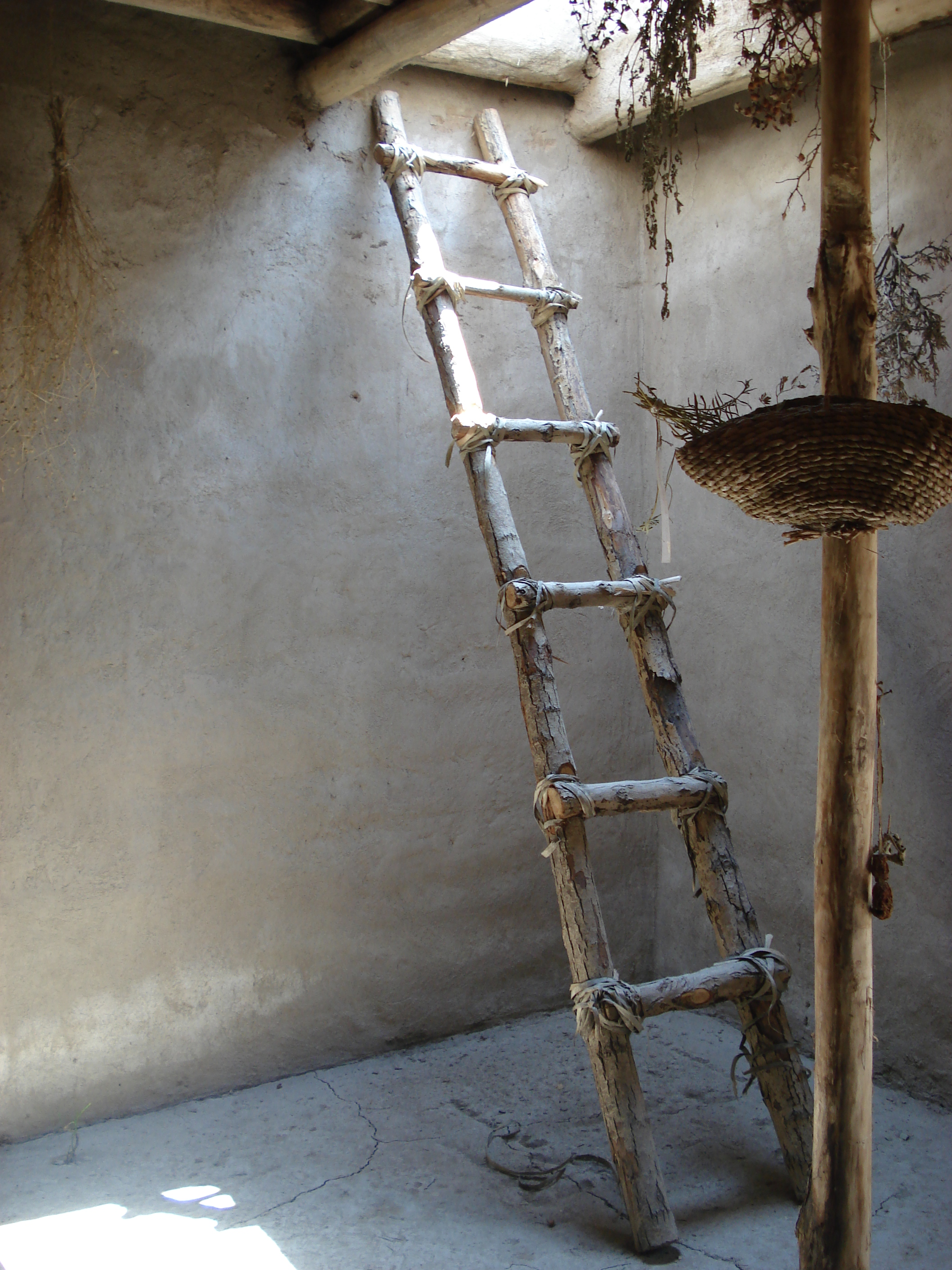
Reconstructed ladder entrance

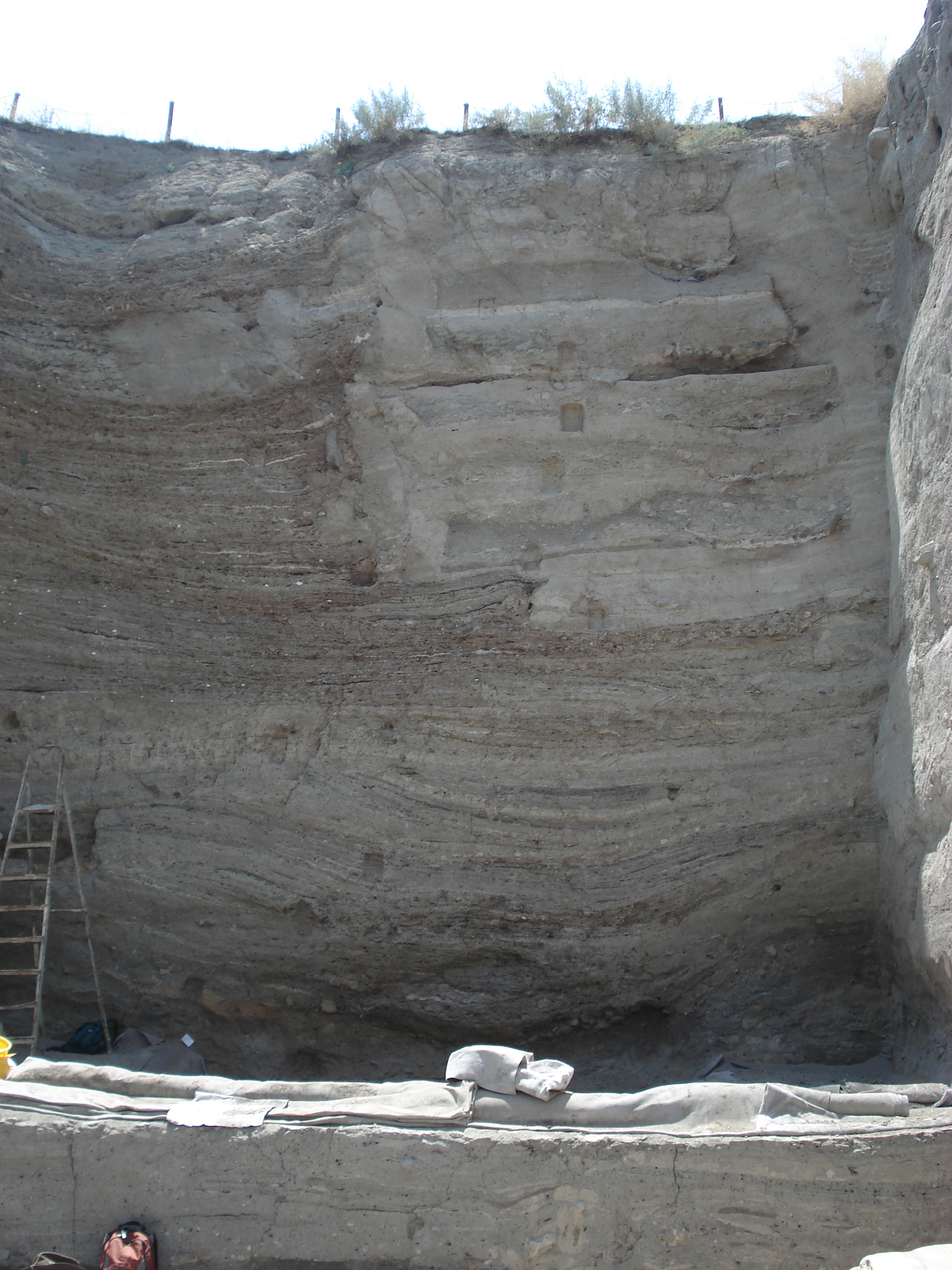
Deep sounding

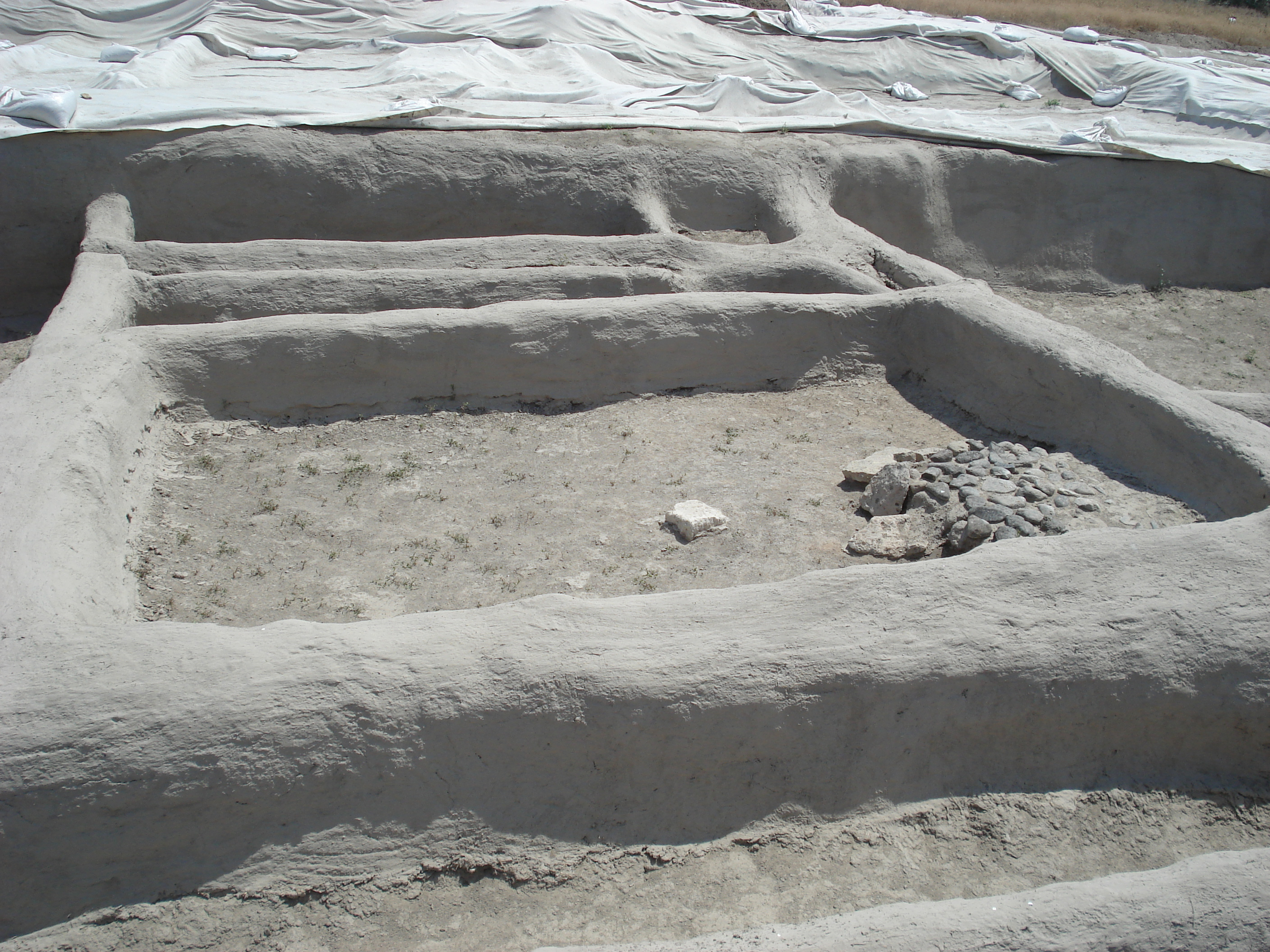
Hearth in house

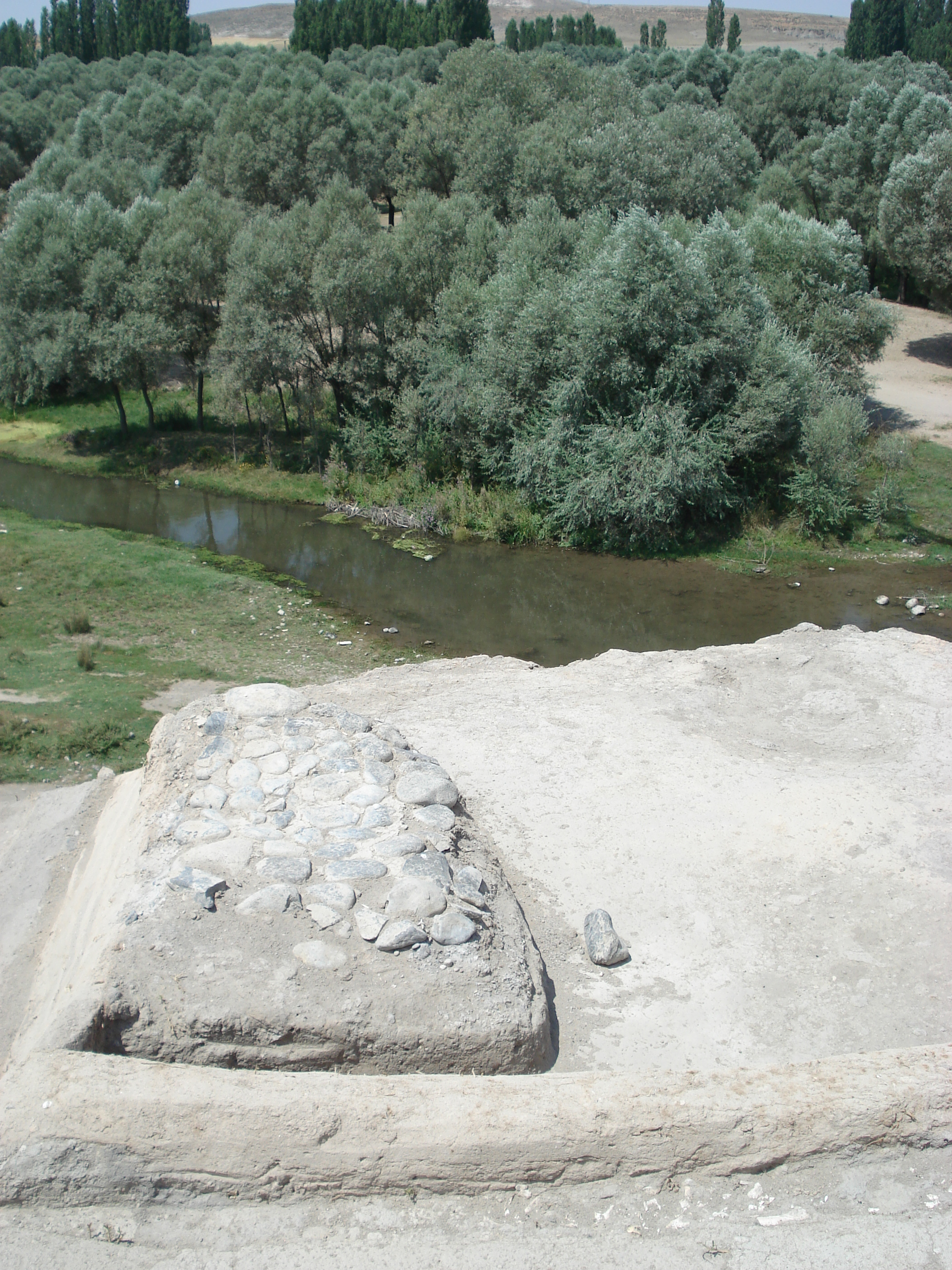
Hearth in partly destroyed house

At Aşıklı Höyük the hearths are rectangular and usually placed in one of the corners of the rooms, ranging in size from 2.97 to 0.48 square metres (32.0 to 5.2 sq ft).

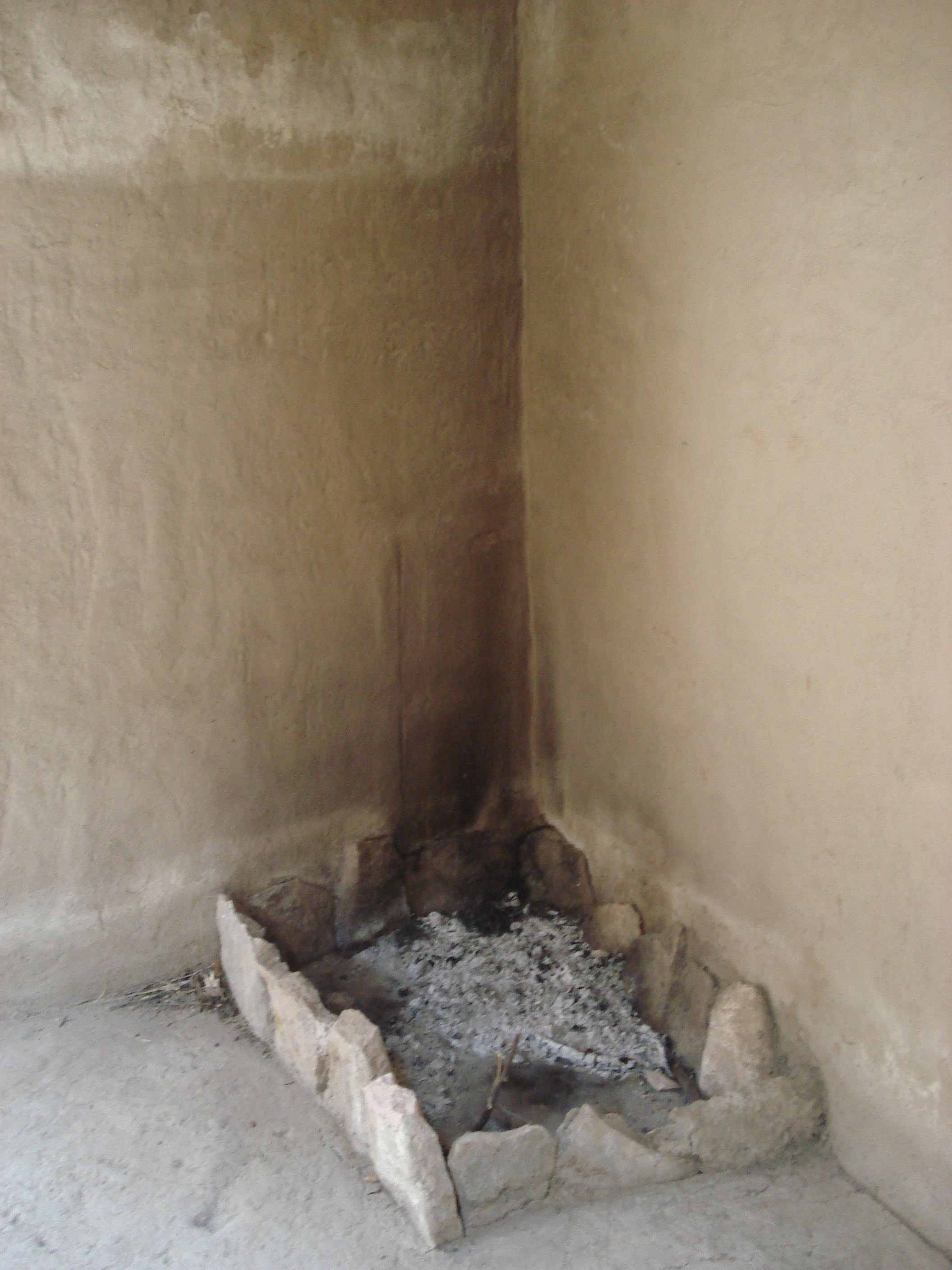
Reconstructed hearth

Large stones with a suitable flat shape were used to create an upright edge that stood approximately 20 cm (7.9 in) above the level of the floor. On the short side of the hearth the upright edge is missing to make a fire mouth. It is also here the ash is the most concentrated. Pebbles along the edges and base of the hearth seem to have been covered by a thin layer of plaster. Only in a few cases there is a trace of something recognized as a flue.

An estimated 30–40% of all the rooms at Aşıklı Höyük have hearths. This estimate is based on partially damaged and eroded structures possibly giving a number lower than accurate. Based on a limited group of fully exposed buildings 54% of single room units contained a hearth, while only 29% of the multiple room units. The average percentage on base of these building units is 47%, probably a more realistic estimate for the site in total. Hearths do not occur in a courtyard context, and are more represented in single room dwellings than multiple room units. Still, multiple room units do have a substantial number of hearths. It has been suggested that the "multiroom dwellings may have functioned as 'incomplete' houses for new families still heavily dependent on the larger extended group". The buildings containing the hearths do not show particular characteristics that distinguish them from structures without hearths; neither do they differ in size or special orientation. Even the hearth itself does not follow an apparent norm in terms of size or location. The position varies considerably, but it always has one side to the wall. The positioning of the hearth does not seem to be determined by general macro-ecological factors, such as prevailing wind directions, nor determined by cultural norms regarding spatial features within buildings.

The hearth does not seem to be subject to a random placement inside the buildings: it is consistently located at the same spot throughout a very long building sequence. This indicates that their positions were not chosen arbitrarily. When a location for the hearth was chosen it was important that the placement did not change in later rebuilding sequences of the structure (see picture: Deep sounding). There is no evidence for ladderpost scars due to the assumed use of freestanding ladders, making the location of the entrance uncertain. Aşıklı Höyük does not seem to have any evidence for ovens.

== Buildings ==
Aşıklı Höyük had a tradition to reconstruct or rebuild earlier structures. It followed a pattern where the structures were built "exactly on the same spot and with the same alignment as earlier buildings, using older walls as a foundation". The structural continuity at Aşıklı Höyük is outstanding, but there is no information to how long the use-life of a building was. If one estimates the same lifespan for a structure at Aşıklı Höyük as it was in Çatalhöyük, one could look at an age of 30 to 60 years before reconstruction occurred. If this assumption is correct, the deep sounding 4H/G from phases 2I up to 2B (eight layers in total) show that the time span of a structure could be from 240 to 480 years. Looking outside of Central Anatolian Neolithic, this type of building continuity is unparalleled both in ethnography and archaeology. This remarkable structural continuity may suggest a social system in which buildings were not privately owned, since one would expect them to be modified on a regular basis. It can be assumed that the rooms were distributed amongst the community members according to the change in both needs and statuses.

The building practices maintained their characteristics throughout the centuries. It has been claimed that the building continuity is a self-evident feature, since it is deriving from a particular set of foundation practices that can be explained in a functionalistic way. It has otherwise been argued that the extreme degree of continuity is inadequately explained by functionalism alone, since the structures located adjacent to open spaces could have easily been expanded or shrunk according to the specific needs, but instead remained identical. These functionalist parameters can also not explain the continued rebuilding of the hearths, which are always built on the same spot. Individual hearth sequences are often separated with 40 cm (16 in) of soil, and therefore there is no apparent reason (unlike the buildings) why the hearths should consistently be constructed in the same corner as in the successive buildings. In many cases neighbouring buildings do place their respective hearths in different corners. Micro-cosmological special codes or wind direction does not seem to be decisive for the positioning of the hearth. The structural and material remains indicate that the buildings were continuous entities with some form of fixed special identity where the special organization could not be changed by the temporary occupant.

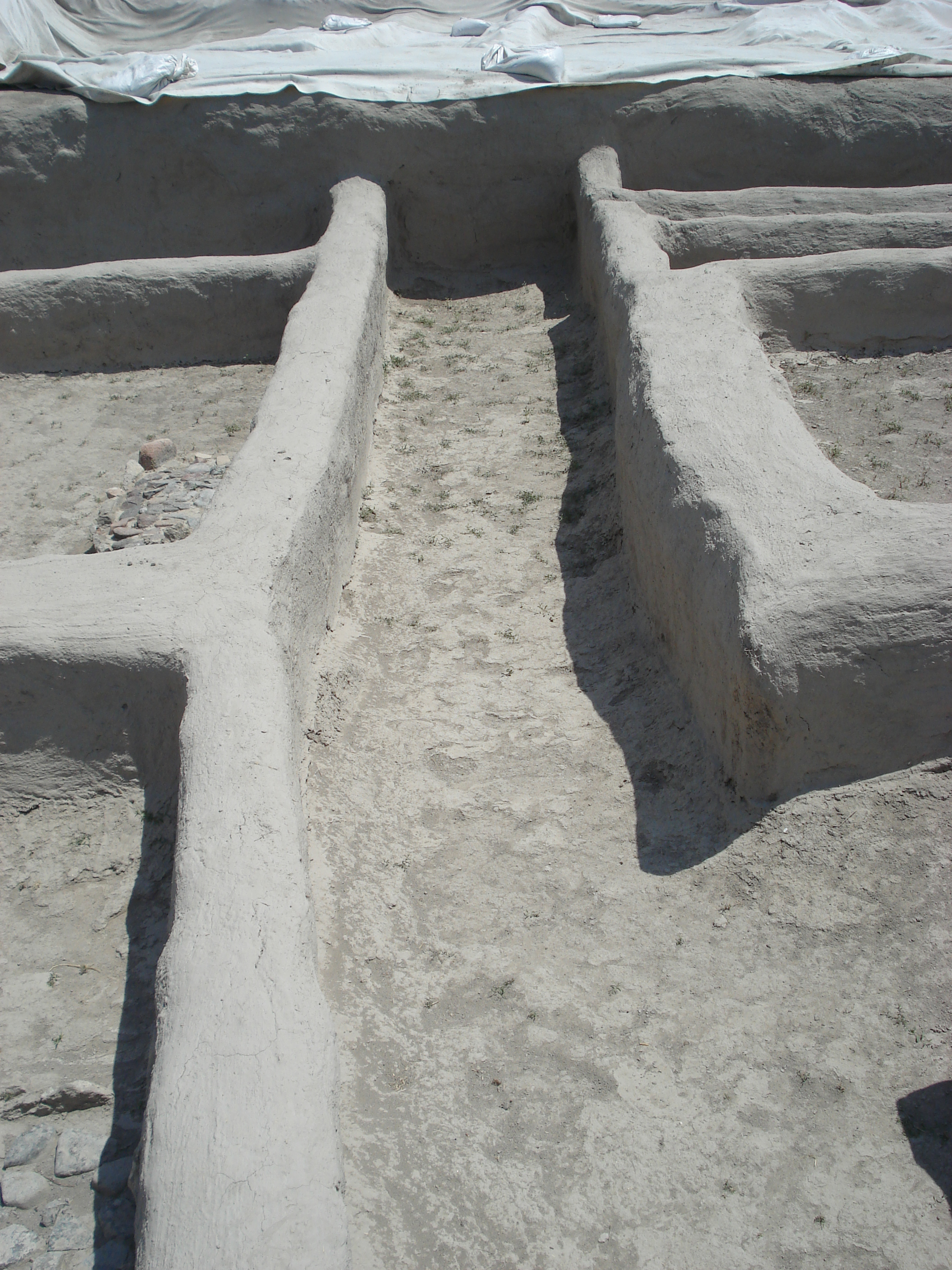
Excavated buildings

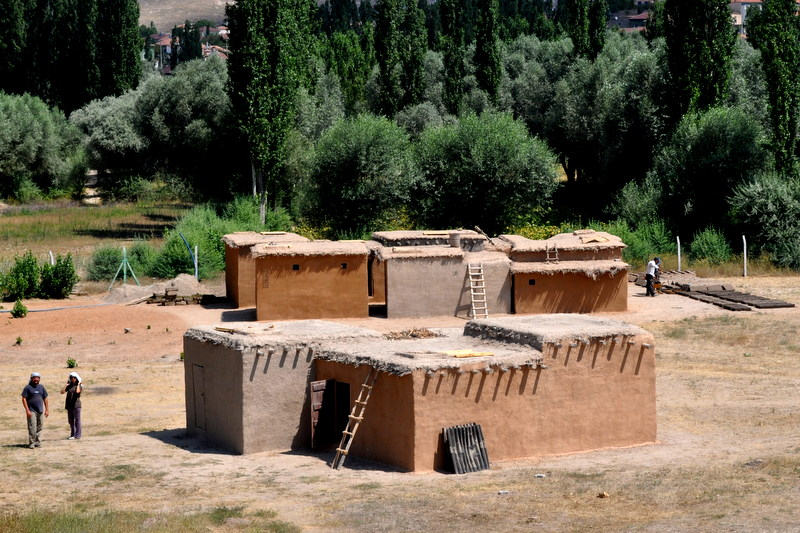
Reconstructed buildings

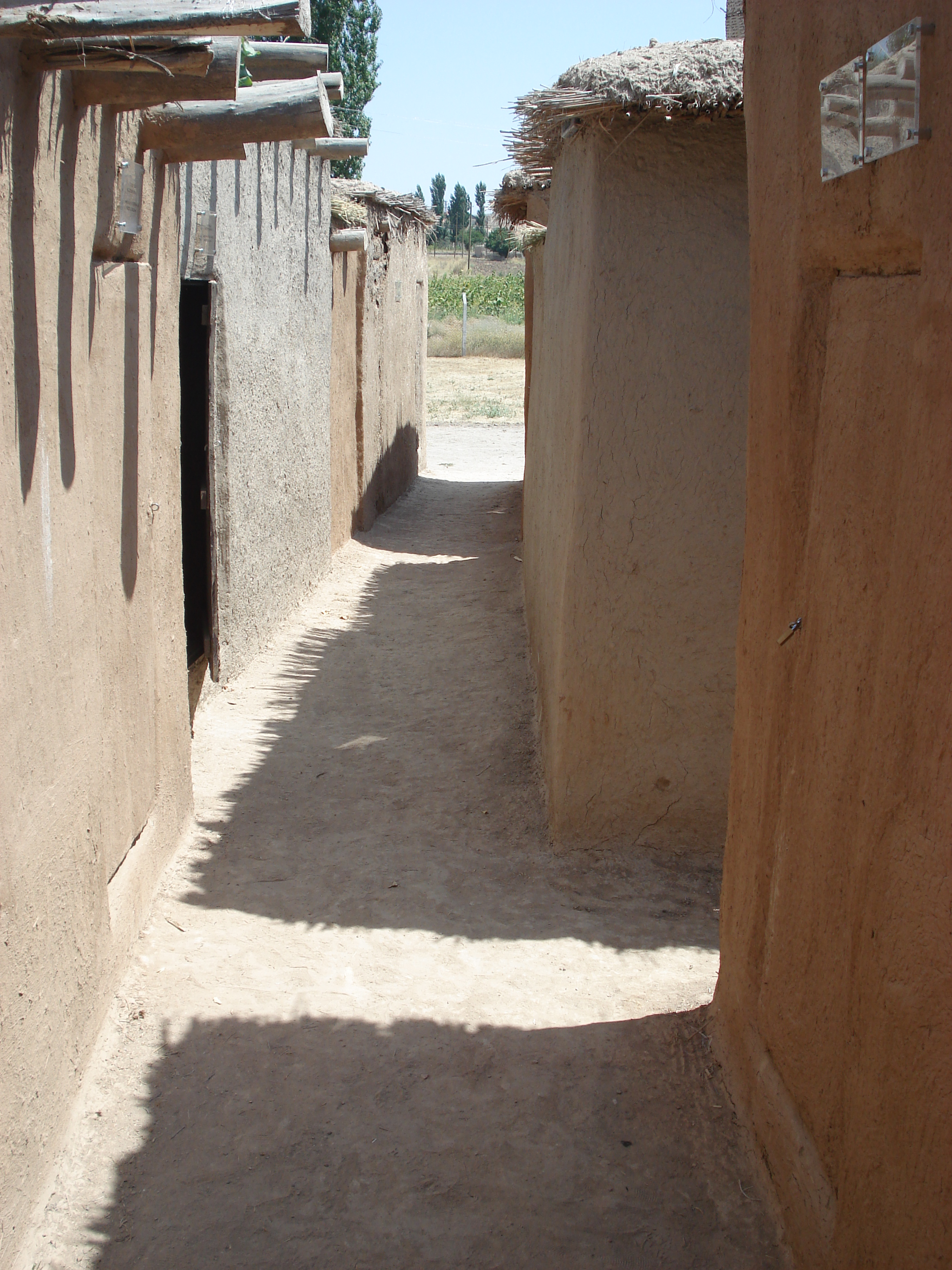
Reconstructed buildings

Structural continuity was of great importance to the inhabitants of Aşıklı Höyük. The reason for this has partly been explained because they (the people) had a rigid adherence to traditions in terms of structural reproduction. The "traditional view" has been disputed because "[In short,] labelling a society as conservative does not answer the question why the people under consideration were conservative". An alternative approach refers to the historical dimension of the building to be of such great importance that "people came to be bound between walls, metaphorically domesticated". The interpretation is that the walls are giving historical associations to the people living within them, giving a collective conscience lasting through time. The difference between this interpretation and the "conservative approach" is the potential explanation to why structural reproduction could have been important for the inhabitants of Aşıklı Höyük. The identities of the inhabitants were projected to the structural outcome of the buildings. The generality of this position is not meaningful on its own. It is not certain that the inhabitants of Aşıklı Höyük were aware of the total amount of building there was in the sequence in total. Perhaps the history of a building did not concern them in the same way as archaeologists like to think.

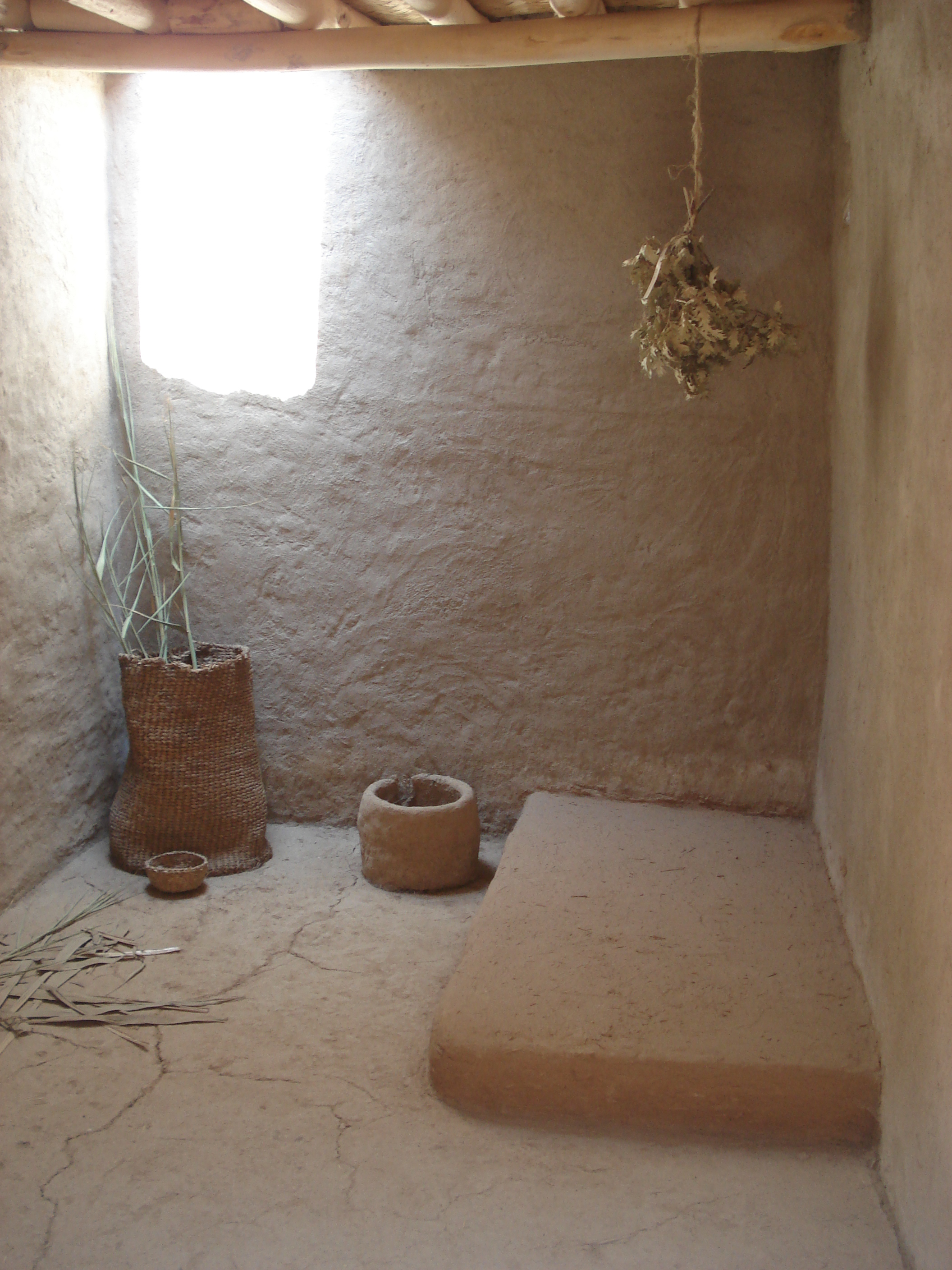
Inside reconstructed building

The lack of change over time suggests that the inhabitants of Aşıklı Höyük had a view of the past as a precedent for the present: a vital part of society that was 'reborn' in each reproduction, manifested in its building continuity. The structural reconstruction is a regional feature for Central Anatolia. With the exception of Jericho, most of the evidence from PPNB sites in the Levant indicates that structures were not reconstructed in the same loci, and some location structures differ in dates by several hundred years.

The buildings at Aşıklı Höyük are clustered into what has been interpreted as neighbourhoods. As this is a vague perception of the structural outlay of the community it describes them as clustered single and multiroom houses forming compounds, apparently sharing courtyard space for production activities and practising joint cooking and food consumption. Little can be said on the food storage, since there were no remains after storage bins, although storage rooms may be identified due to comparing structures on other sites (e.g. Çatalhöyük).

The average room size is 12 m^{2} (130 sq ft) (at this time humans were 1.5 to 1.7 metres (4 ft 11 in to 5 ft 7 in) tall). From two or three up to five or six clustered dwelling formed a 'neighbourhood' or compound. The interpretation of the borders of these 'neighbourhoods' is problematic, since much of the site still lies under the baulks, is in situ or eroded. The distribution of single- and multi-room buildings does not seem to follow a pattern other than that the residential clusters seem to be divided by narrow alleys 0.5–1.0 m (1 ft 8 in – 3 ft 3 in) wide, or open courtyard areas up to a diameter of 4 m (13 ft). The interior of multiroom buildings had openings in the partitioned walls, providing access to the individual rooms. Between the one building and the next there seems to be no communication, since there was no indication of doors in the exterior mudbrick walls. Since the buildings themselves do not have an entrance that can be traced archaeologically on the base of the walls, access had to be provided either through window-like openings high on the walls or from the flat roofs. Roof access is also known from Çatalhöyük, making this entrance more plausible.

Aşıklı Höyük does also have buildings that are bigger in size but without hearths. These are interpreted as public buildings or 'building complexes'. These are seen as some of the most enigmatic buildings found at the site, and diverge both in size and spatial organization. One of them (complex HV) being at up to 20 times larger than the largest loam buildings (i.e. 25 m × 20 m (82 ft × 66 ft) = 500 m^{2} (5,400 sq ft)). They have a multitude of rooms and encompass elaborate and large internal courts; something that is not found in any other buildings. The walls are more robust and massive than other buildings, in some cases being referred to as "monumental walls", accompanied by parallel outer walls with relatively narrow space in between.

The interpretation of these buildings is difficult. The fact that they clearly differentiate from the domestic loam buildings indicates that they had special value in the society. They also do not incorporated into the clustered 'neighbourhoods', indicating that they served several neighbourhoods or the local community at large. With 500 m^{2} (5,400 sq ft) the range of activities that could have taken place in this space could easily incorporate several hundred people. Yet, given that the estimated population of Aşıklı Höyük may have run into the thousands, only a selected group in the total population could have used the building at a given occasion. There is a variety of hypotheses regarding the nature of these monumental structures. There are other examples of these restricted monumental spaces on other sites in the Levantine PPNB (such as Nevali Çori, Behida, ‘Ain Ghazal), suggesting that they were used by an elite or for practising different social initiation rites.

== Other material ==
There are no finds of any artefacts carrying religious connotations, symbolic or imagery, at Aşıklı Höyük, in the buildings, courtyards, dumps or open-workshop areas. The only finds include flint tools, which are counted as imports. Other than this there is found one single animal figurine made of clay that can hardly tell us anything of the religious belief of the inhabitants. The limited amount of burials compared to the estimated population makes it very likely that there may have been a cemetery where the deceased were buried, but it has not been found. There is also an absence of storage bins, making the distinction on autonomous households difficult.

== See also ==
- Neolithic Revolution
- Neolithic architecture
- List of largest cities throughout history
- Çatalhöyük
- Göbekli Tepe
- Ancestral Puebloans
