= Church of Saint Mary Draperis, Istanbul =

Church of Saint Mary Draperis
- Meryem Ana Draperis Kilisesi
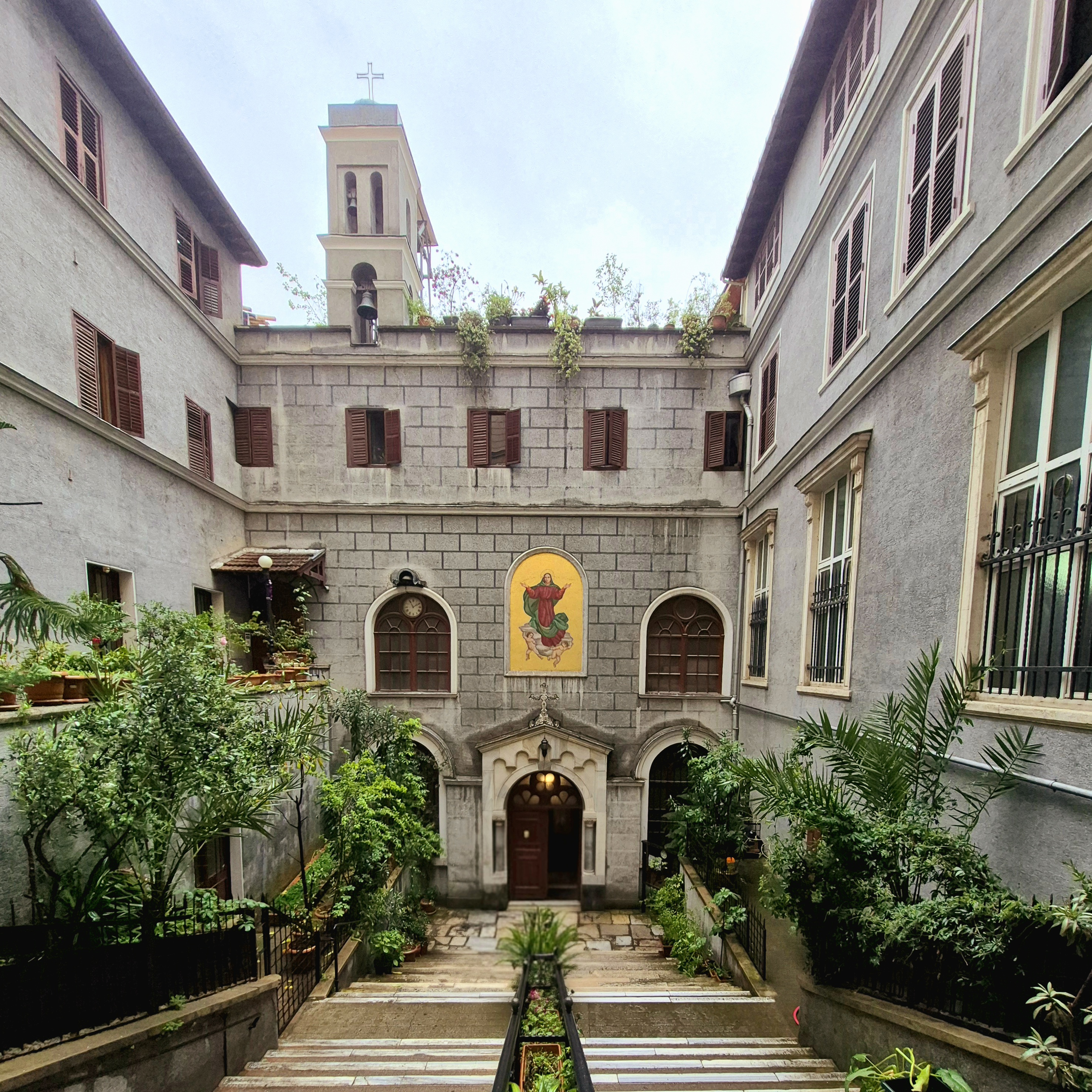
- The entrance of the Church

- Location in Istanbul
- 41°01′49″N 28°58′33″E
- Location: Beyoğlu, Istanbul
- Country: Turkey
- Denomination: Catholic

History
- Dedication: Saint Mary

Architecture
- Completed: 1678

Saint Mary Draperis (Italian: Santa Maria Draperis, Turkish: Meryem Ana Draperis Latin Katolik Kilisesi) is a Catholic church in Istanbul, important for historical reasons. Established in 1678, the church is one of the most ancient Catholic parishes of Istanbul.

The edifice lies in Istanbul, in the district of Beyoğlu, at 215, Istiklal Caddesi, (the ancient Grande Rue de Pera), at the bottom of a steep staircase, which is protected by an artistic fence.

== History ==
In 1453, a few months before the Ottoman Conquest of Constantinople, Observant Franciscan Friars completed the construction of the church of Saint Anthony of the Cypresses (Italian: Sant'Antonio dei Cipressi) in Sirkeci (at that time center of the venetian Merchants in Constantinople), on the southern bank of the Golden Horn, but soon after the Conquest they were forced to abandon it. After several peregrinations, in 1584 they moved to Galata, in the neighborhood of Mumhane (English: Candle workshop), where a Levantine woman, Clara Maria Draperis, endowed them a house with a tiny chapel. The altar of the chapel was adorned with a wooden icon portraying the Virgin Mary. The chapel burned completely in 1660, and the icon was rescued by a member of the Draperis family. In case of total destruction because of fire, Ottoman law imposed the restitution of the land to the State. Because of that, in order to rebuild the church the friars should have first asked for a Sultan's Firman allowing the reconstruction, but in absence of that the just rebuilt church was demolished in 1663 by the Ottoman government. The friars then abandoned the neighborhood and settled uphill in Pera, in a place named Dörtyol (four roads). They built there in 1678 a new church, which burned in 1697, was rebuilt and destroyed again by the strong earthquake of 1727. Erected once again, the edifice burned for the third time in 1767 and was finally rebuilt for the fifth time in 1769. After each catastrophe the icon of the Virgin could always be rescued, and embellishes still today the main altar. Together with the churches of Saint Anthony of Padua, also on Istiklal Caddesi, Saint Benoit, Saint George, Saint-Louis-des-Français, and Saints Peter and Paul in Galata, the church was one of several Catholic parishes in the Levantine quarter of Istanbul. During the 19th century S. Mary became one of the most prestigious Catholic Churches in the city. In 1803 its parish had a flock of 470 Levantines, plus several Arab Catholics from Aleppo and Armenian Catholics.

The church is still officiated by reformed Franciscan friars who offer daily masses in Italian and mass in Spanish every Sunday.

On March 25, 1911, the icon enshrined was pontifically crowned.

== Architecture and interior ==
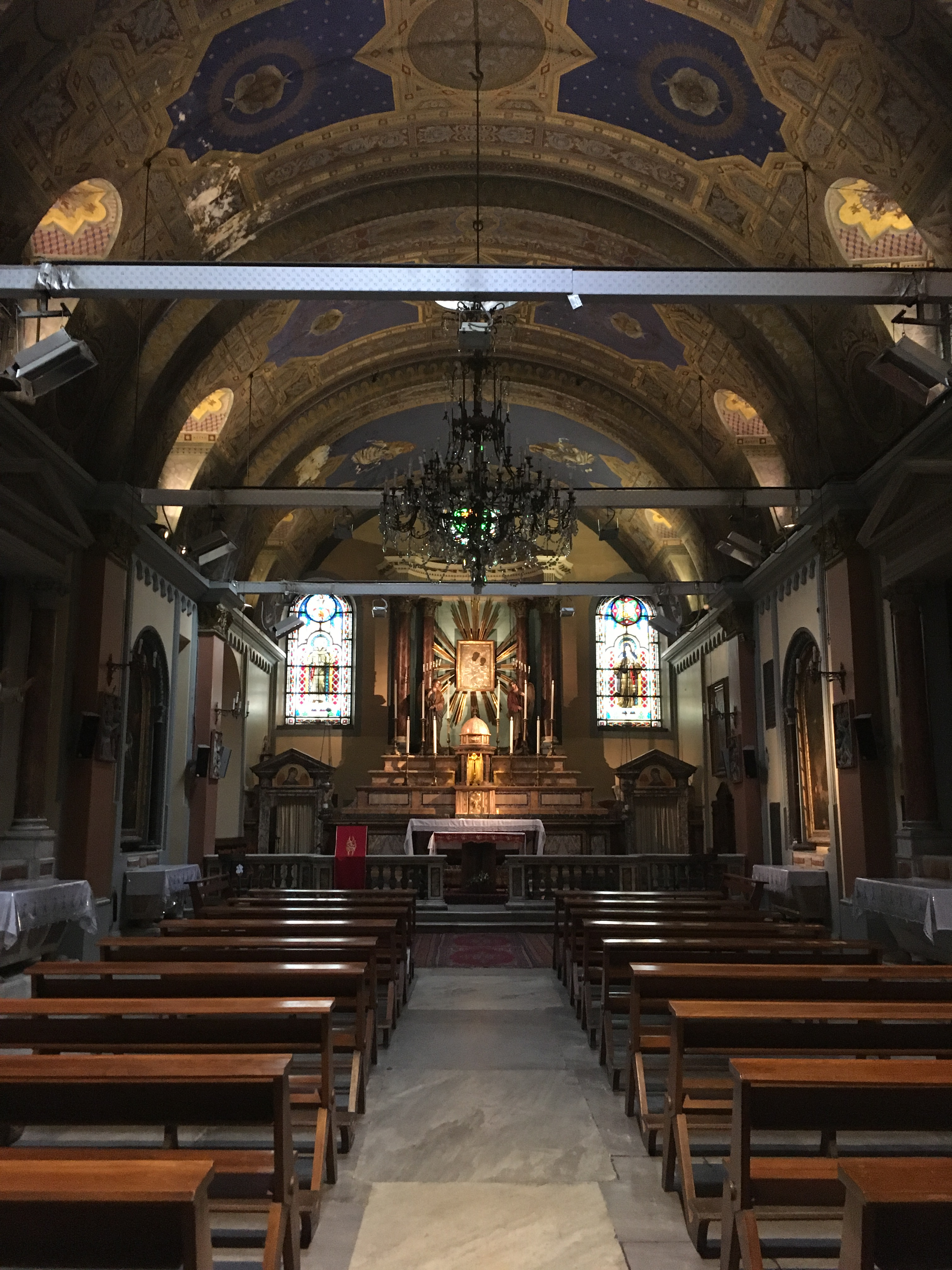
View from inside the church

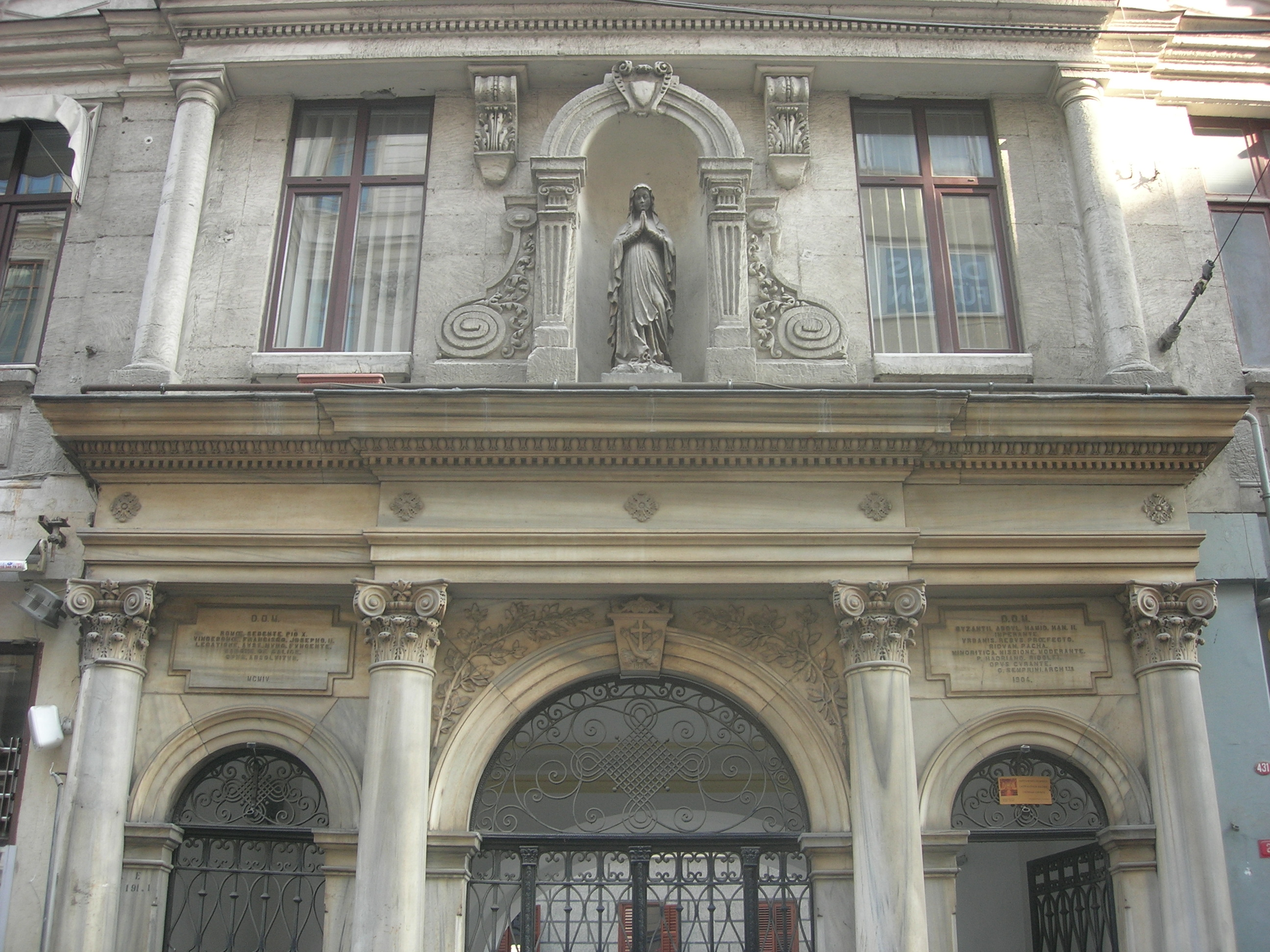
The upper part of the complex façade on Istiklal Caddesi

The complex has an entrance in neoclassical style - embellished by a statue of the Virgin in a niche - on Istiklal Caddesi, which is followed by a flight of steps leading downhill to the church. The edifice has a rectangular plan and is covered by a barrel vault - decorated in 1874 - and has three naves. The church has a bell tower with square plan, not visible from the road. The imposing main altar, erected in 1772, is made of pink Carrara marble and is adorned with the Icon donated by Maria Draperis. The church is adorned with four paintings, three being of Venetian school. The first on the right side entering the church - painted in 1873 - represents the immaculate Virgin with two Franciscan saints. The second represents Saint Francis of Assisi receiving the Stigmata at La Verna. To the left of the presbytery there is a painting representing the death of Saint Joseph assisted by Jesus and Mary, while another one near the entrance represent Saint Roch, protector against plague, an illness which hit Istanbul several times in the past. The Via Crucis, the statue of Saint Anthony and the fresco in the baptistery are all 1959 works of the Franciscan Father Alberto Farina.

The two stained glass windows on the apse are of German school and represent Saint Francis and St. Clare of Assisi. Inside the church, several inscribed gravestones from the 18th and 19th centuries (most of them in Italian or Latin) remember wealthy Levantine families, church's benefactors, bishops and Consuls of the European nations in Constantinople.

== Gallery ==
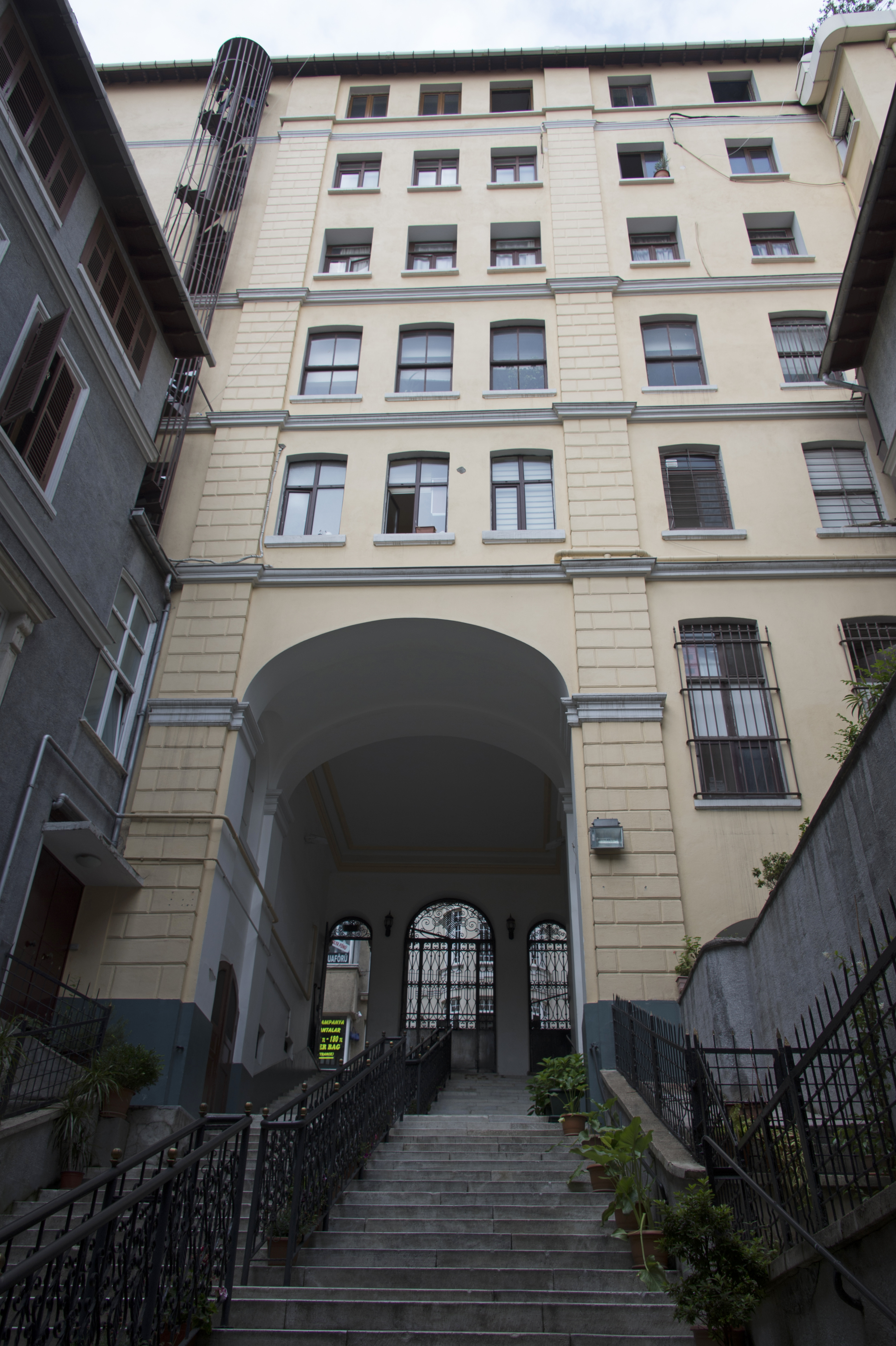
St Maria Draperis stairs to Istiklal Caddesi

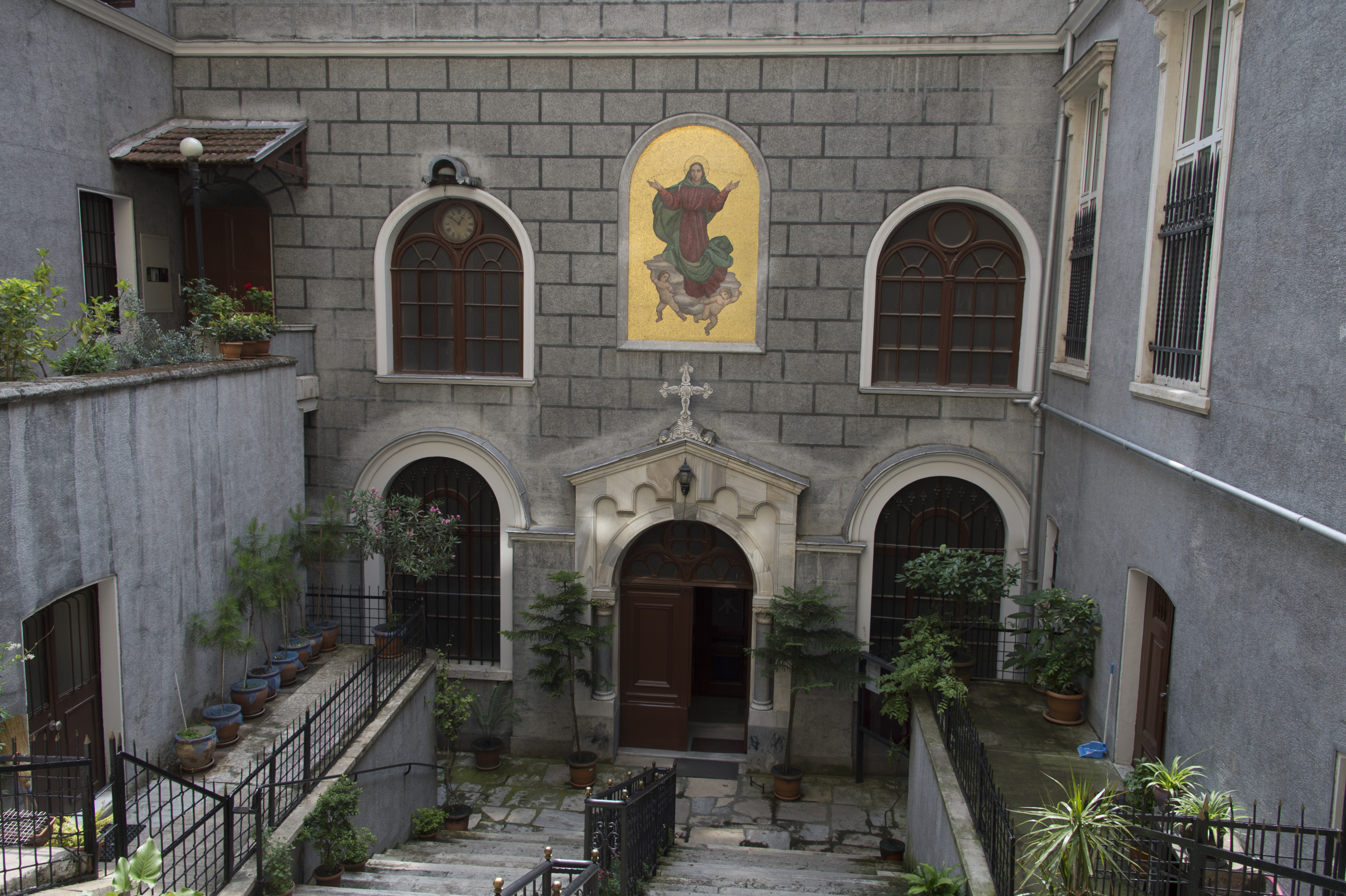
St Maria Draperis stairs from Istiklal Caddesi

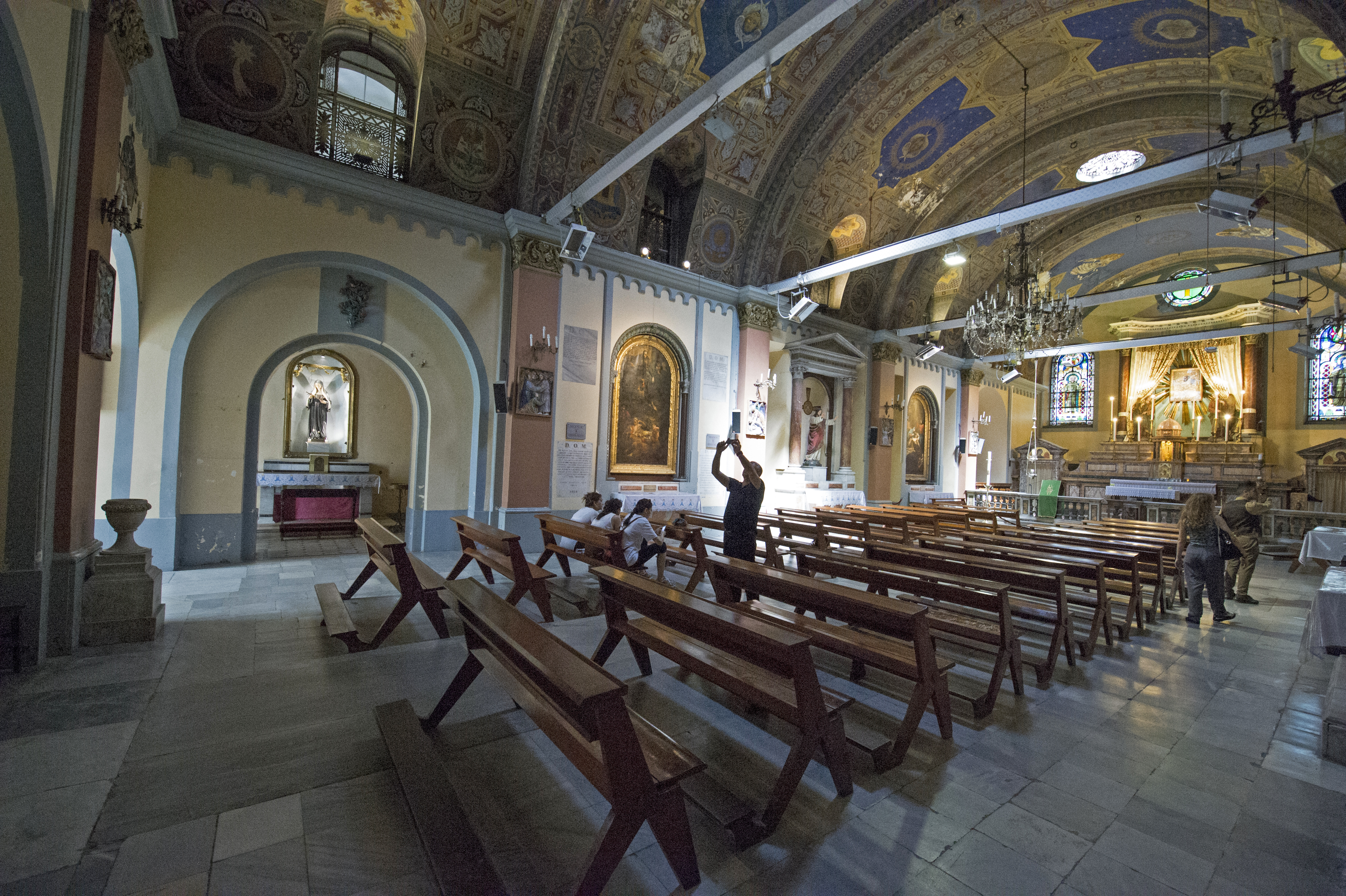
St Maria Draperis interior

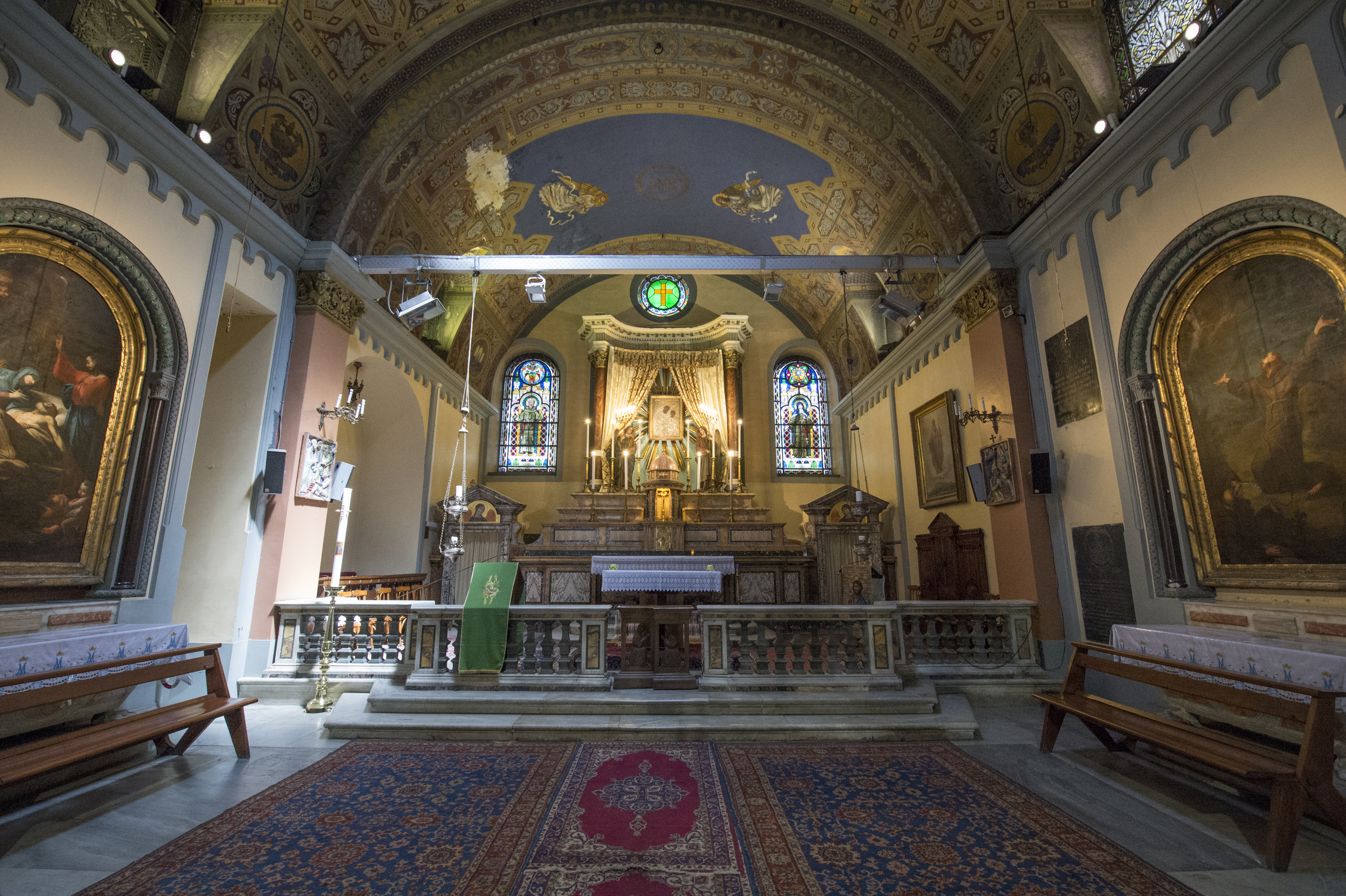
St Maria Draperis altar area

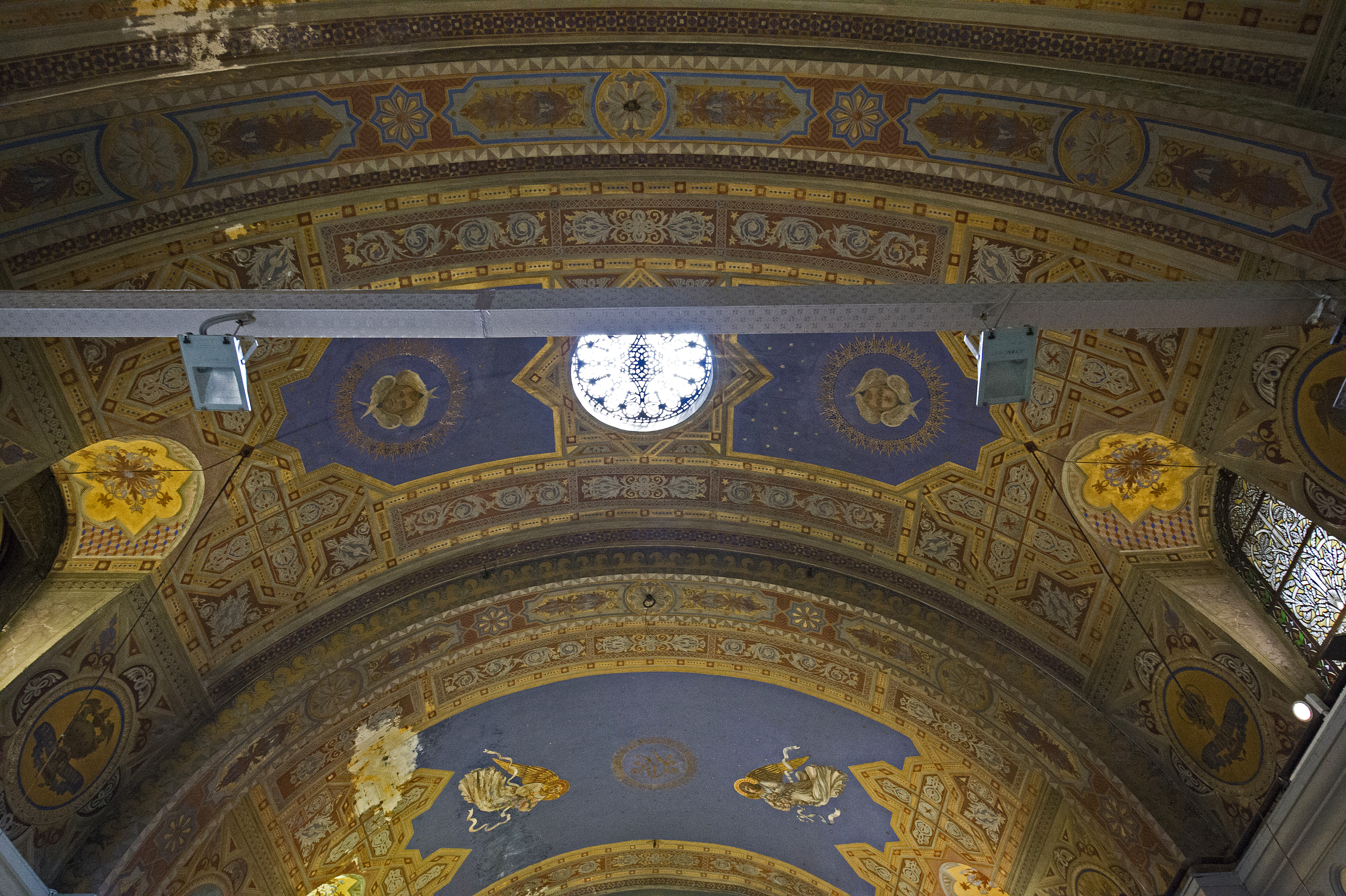
St Maria Draperis ceiling in apse

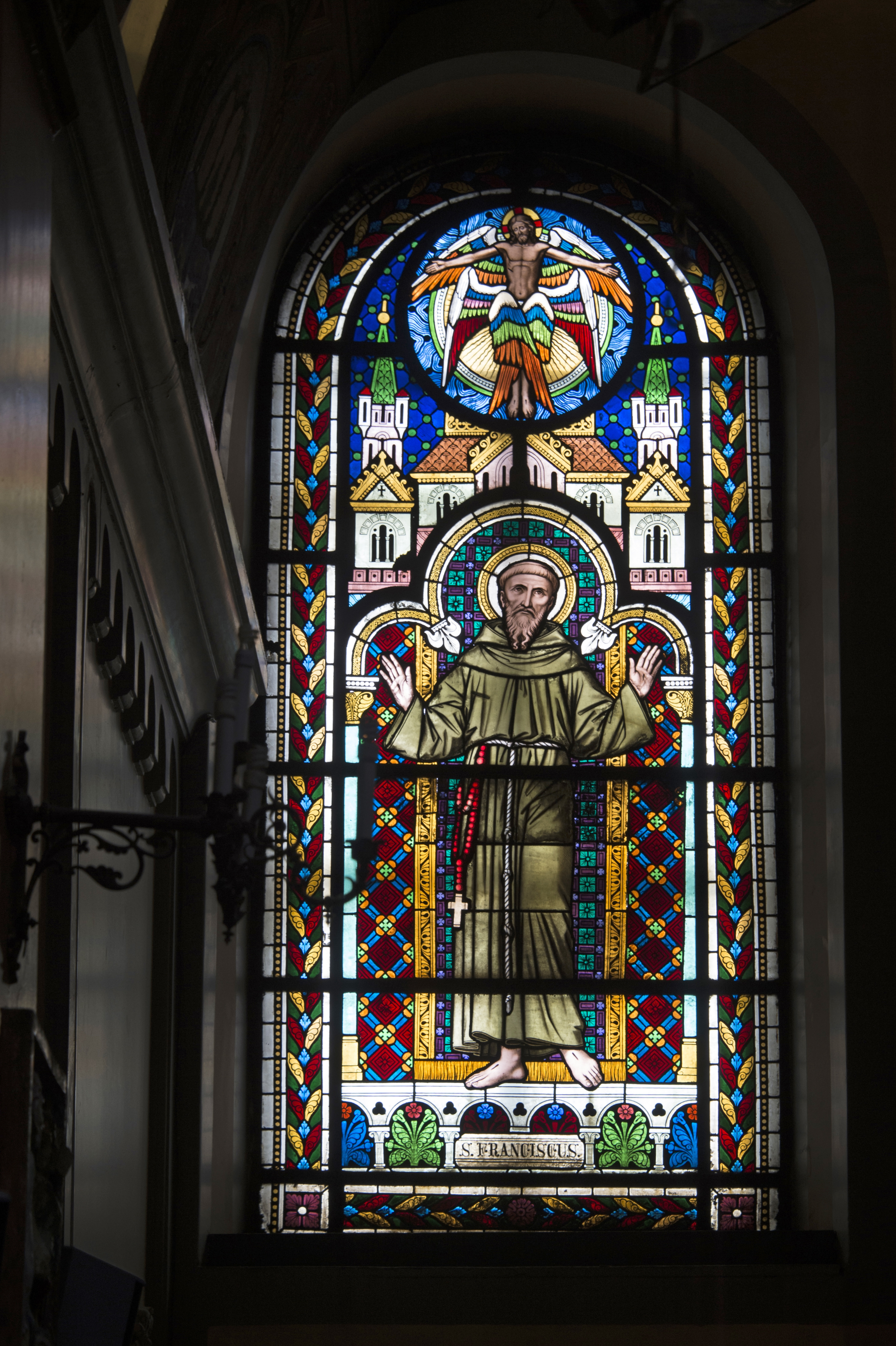
St Maria Draperis St. Francis of Assisi

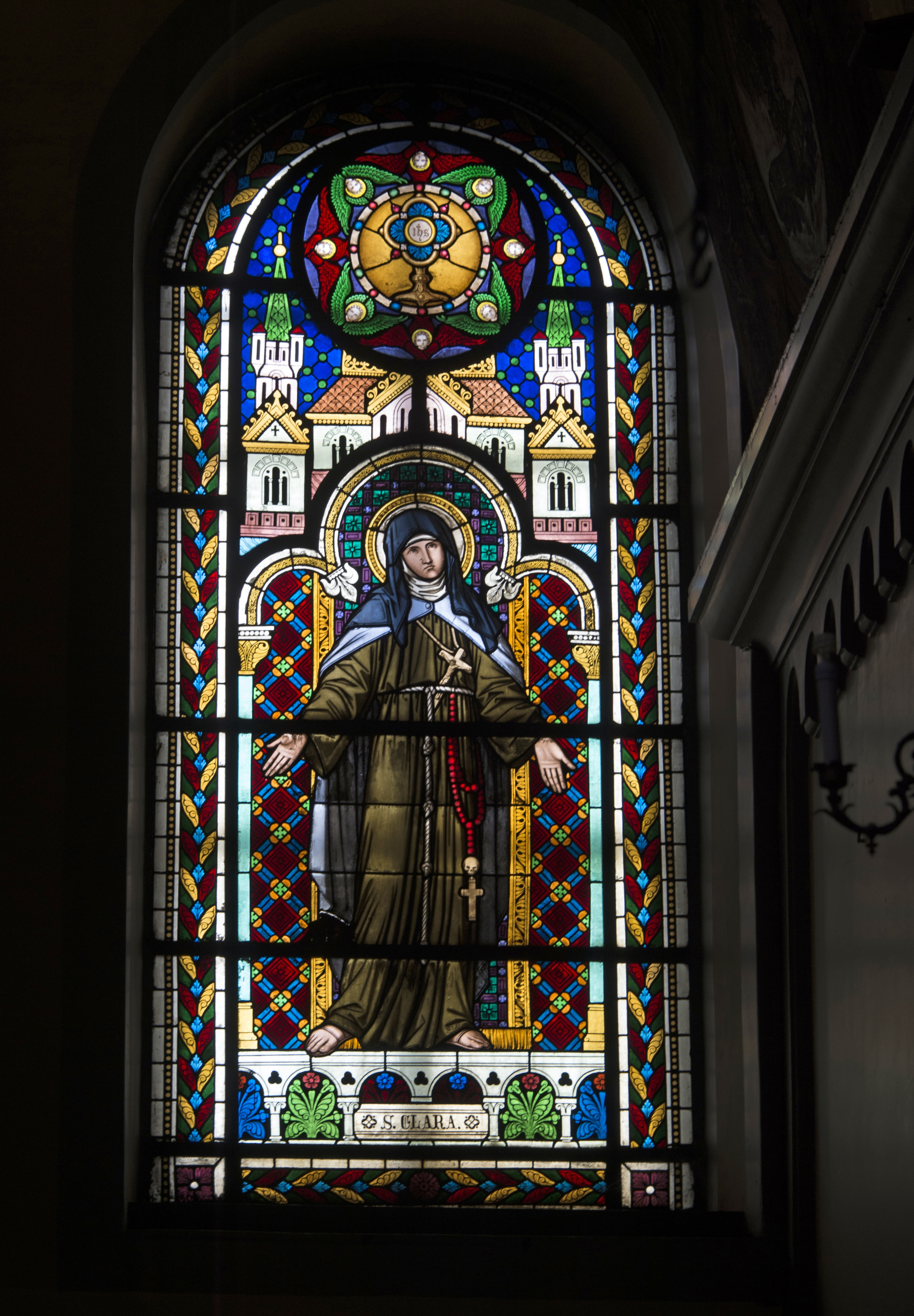
St Maria Draperis St. Clare of Assisi

== Sources ==
- Mamboury, Ernest (1953). The Tourists' Istanbul. Istanbul: Çituri Biraderler Basımevi.
- Schmitt, Oliver Jens (2005). Levantiner. Lebenswelten und Identitäten einer ethnokonfessionellen Gruppe im osmanischen Reich im langen 19. Jahrhundert (in German). Munich: Oldenbourg Verlag. ISBN 978-3-4865-7713-6.
- S. Maria Draperis: Notizie sulla chiesa (in Italian), Istanbul: Parrocchia di S. Maria Draperis, 2012
