= Church of Saints Peter and Paul, Istanbul =

Coordinates: 41°1′29″N 28°58′23″E

Church of SS Peter and Paul
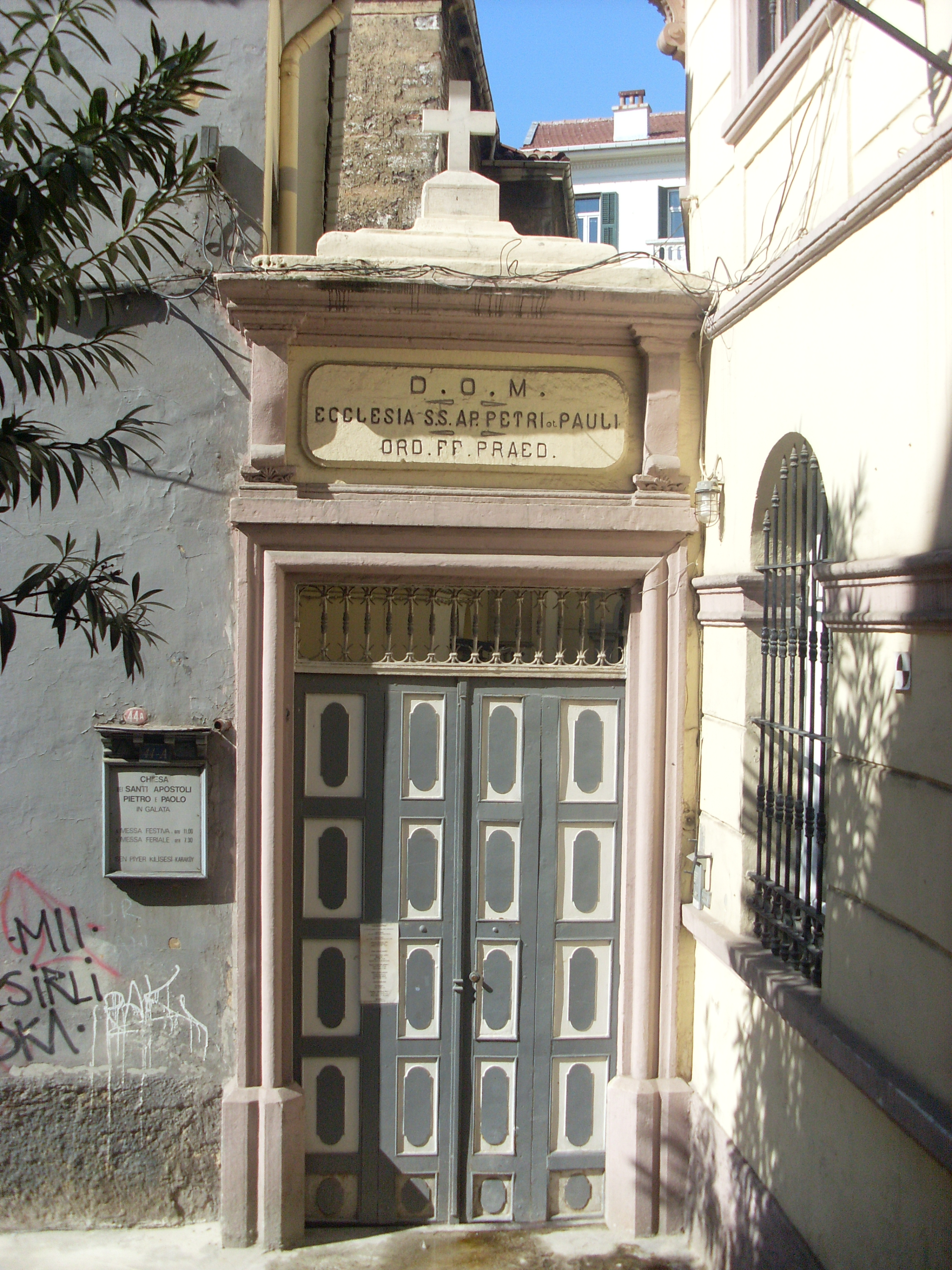
- Entrance to the courtyard of St. Peter's Church in Beyoğlu

- Location in Istanbul
- Location: Galata, Istanbul
- Country: Turkey
- Denomination: Roman Catholic

Architecture
- Architect: Gaspare and Giuseppe Fossati
- Groundbreaking: 1603-4
- Completed: 1843

SS Peter and Paul (Turkish: Sen Pier ve Sen Paul Kilisesi, Italian: Chiesa dei Santi Pietro e Paolo a Galata, French: Eglise Saint Pierre Saint Paul) is a Catholic church in Istanbul, important for historical reasons. The church owns an icon of the Virgin of the Hodegetria type, which originally lay in a Dominican church in Caffa, Crimea. The current building is a nineteenth-century (1841 to 1843) reconstruction of the Fossati brothers. An adjacent former commercial facility, Saint Pierre Han, is (as of 2022) set to be renovated into a cultural center.

== Location ==
The church lies in the Karaköy (ancient Galata) neighborhood of the district of Beyoğlu, Istanbul, Turkey. Its address is Galata Kulesi Sokak 44, Kuledibi.

== History ==
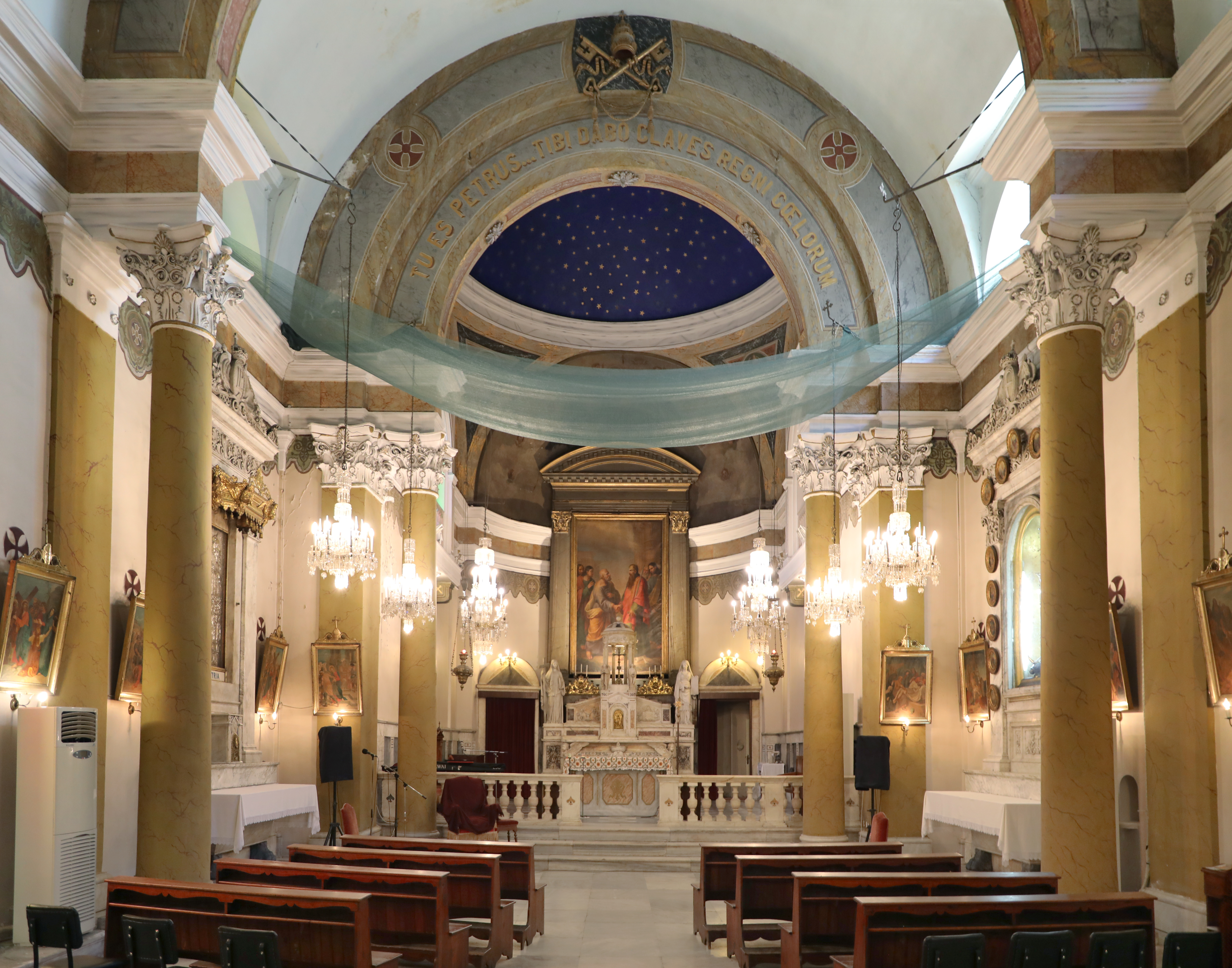
Inside the Church of SS Peter and Paul.

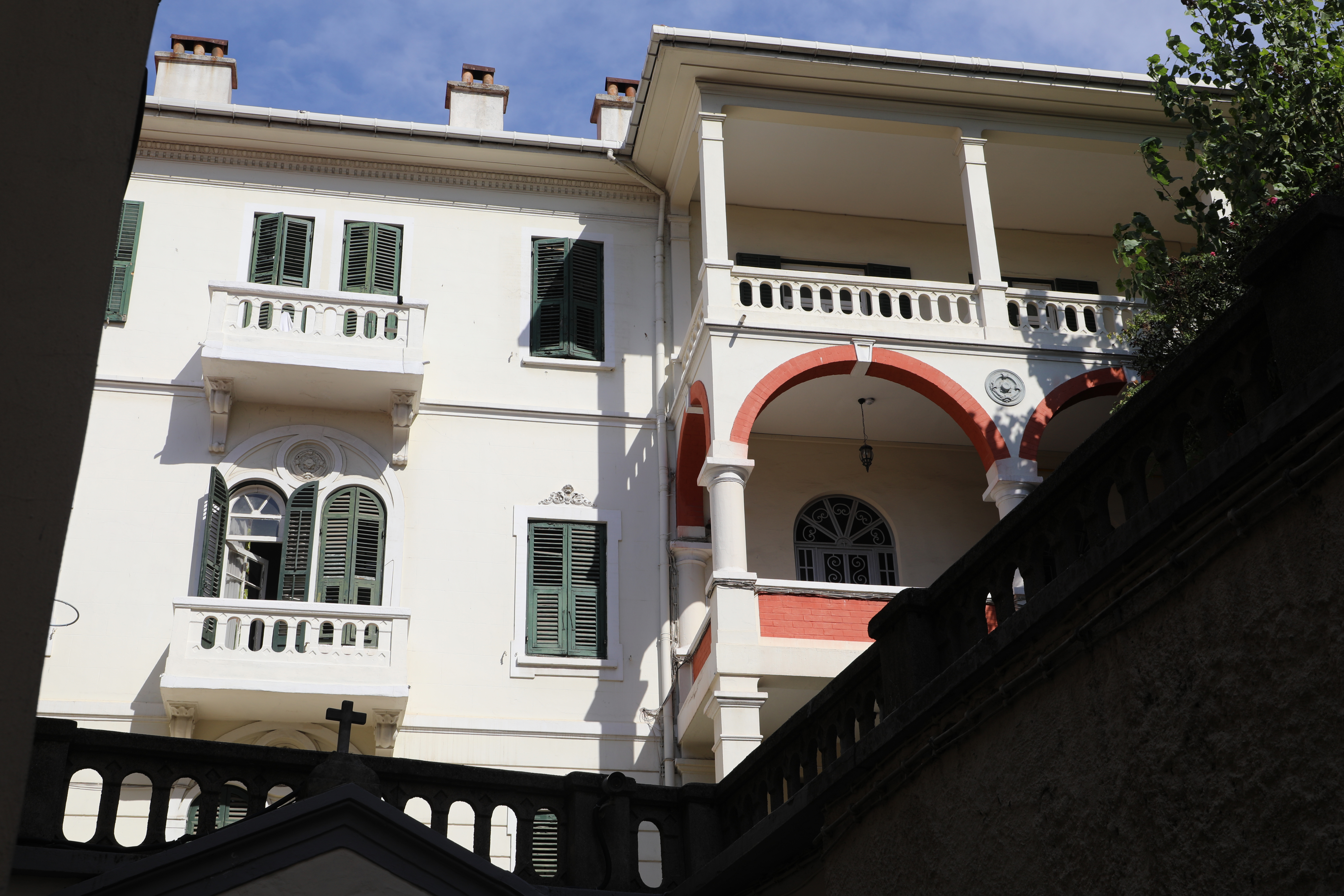
Church of SS Peter and Paul.

In 1475, Sultan Mehmet II converted the Dominican Church of San Paolo in Galata into a mosque. In 1476 the friars moved two hundred meters east, always below the Galata Tower, in a house with a chapel on land owned by the Genoese Zaccaria family.

This chapel was originally established by the Bisticcia family, but eventually came under the ownership of the Zaccaria. While the precise reasons and timing of this transfer remain unclear, it is likely the property was inherited rather than purchased, with the transfer taking place prior to 1475. This date is particularly significant, as it marks the year the Dominican clergy, displaced from SS. Paolo e Domenico after the complex was converted into a mosque, settled in the church, then under the possession of Antonio Zaccaria.

By 1535, the friars formalized their terms with the grandson of Antonio, Angelo Zaccaria, the church’s patron at the time. However, this agreement was merely a renewal of previous arrangements, as the church had been ceded to the Dominicans well before 1535. This fact is clearly stated in the opening lines of the 1535 agreement.

This ancient Genoese family granted the church to the Dominicans for use as a refuge but attached specific conditions renewable every twelve years. They retained their rights as patrons, managing the friars’ assets, overseeing their accounts, and, with the convent superior’s consent, removing clergy involved in misconduct. The friars, in return, were obligated to fund any necessary repairs and, as a gesture of gratitude, present a blessed candle during the Feast of Candelora. Additionally, they were to celebrate a mass in memory of Angelo Zaccaria and other deceased members of the Zaccaria family.

In 1603-1604 the chapel was rebuilt as a larger church together with a monastery. In 1608, a Firman of Sultan Ahmed III put the complex under the protection of the King of France, while at the same time the church also received a yearly subsidy from the Republic of Venice.

In 1640, a large icon of the Hodegetria type (originally in Caffa) which belonged to the Dominican Church of S. Maria di Costantinopoli, located inside the walled city of Istanbul and in that year converted into a mosque, was moved here. In 1660 the church and the monastery burned and, since the destruction had been total (except for the icon which could be rescued), according to the law the ground was returned to the Ottoman Government. Despite that, thanks to the intercession of the European Powers, a new church could be built again in 1702. Since 1706, after the Dominicans refused to deliver the Hodegetria Icon to Venice, the Republic quit paying the subsidy to the church. Around those years, the Icon was partially repainted (the mantle of the Virgin appears now embroidered with the Fleurs-de-lis of France), so that only her face and chest are possibly original. The complex burned again during the great fire of Galata in 1731, and was rebuilt with wood. For most of the 18th century, it was one of three churches in Galata under French protection, the other two being Saint Benoit (held by the Jesuits) and Saint George (Capuchins).

From 1841 to 1843 the Swiss-Italian brothers Gaspare and Giuseppe Fossati erected the present building. Together with Saint Anthony and Saint Mary Draperis, SS. Peter and Paul was one of the three Levantine parishes in Beyoğlu. The parish jurisdiction extended over the lower part of the Galata neighborhood, a popular area which often became the first residence for European immigrants settling in the city. Due to that, the parish's birth, wedding and death registers represent an invaluable source for the history of the recurring waves of immigration in the 18th and 19th century. The church now serves the local Maltese community, with masses in Italian.

== Architecture ==
The church is built in the form of a basilica, with a four side altar. The cupola over the choir is sky blue, studded with gold stars. The church's rear wall is built into a section of Galata's old Genoese ramparts. The church possesses several relics: those of Saint Renatus (found in the catacombs of Galata), and others of Saint Thomas, Saint Dominic and the Saints Peter and Paul. The yard East of the church's entrance takes the form of a narrow alleyway enclosed by high walls which are covered with sculptures and inscribed gravestones, most of them in Italian. More graves are contained in the church's crypt.

== Saint-Pierre Han ==
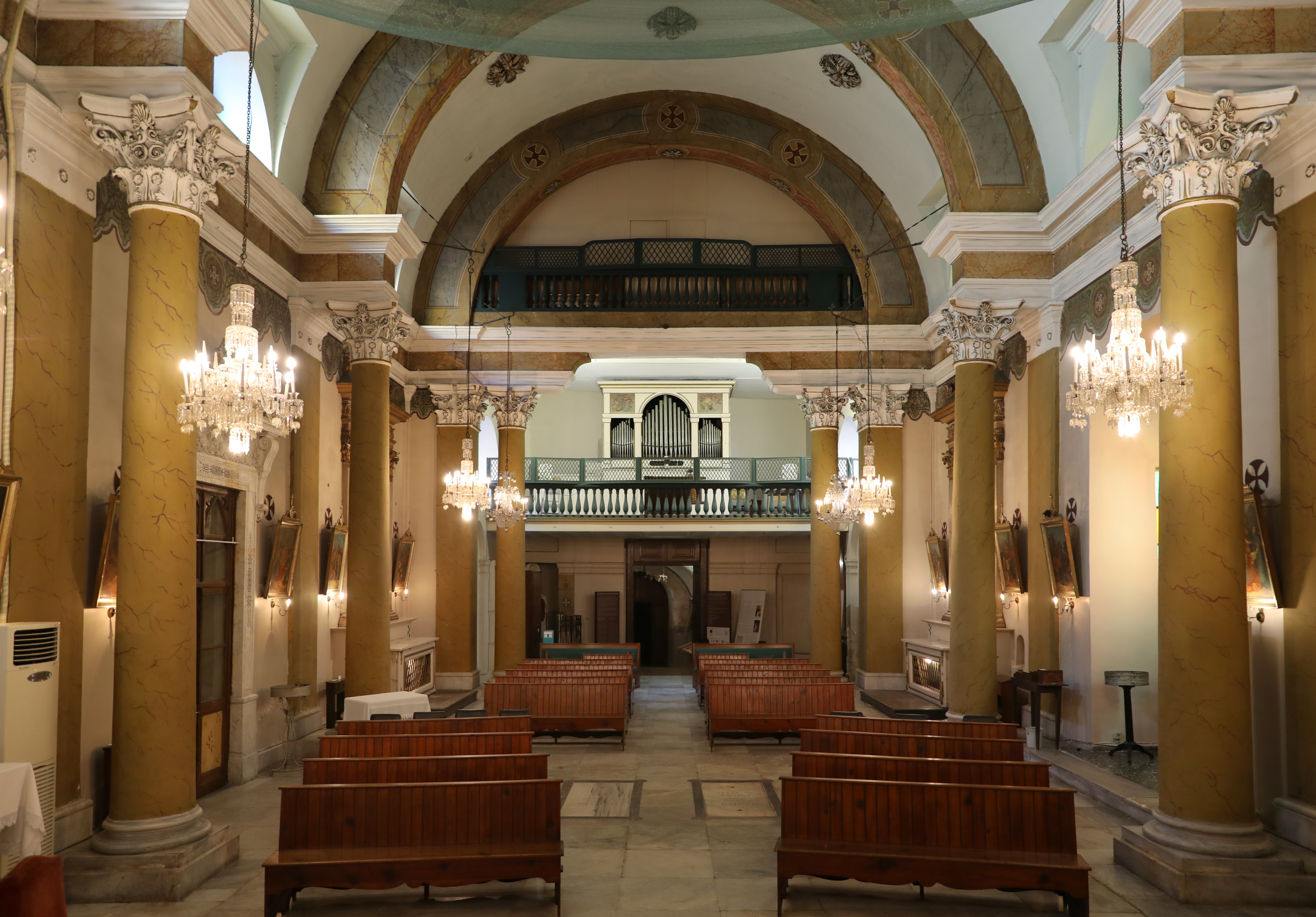
Inside the Church of SS Peter and Paul.

The Saint-Pierre Han is a warehouse and trading venue (or caravanserai, Turkish: Han) that was a commercial dependency of the church erected on its grounds. It was built as a wooden structure in 1732, burned in 1770, and was reconstructed with more durable materials in 1771–1772 on the initiative of French ambassador François-Emmanuel Guignard de Saint-Priest. It housed a number of organizations and enterprises, including the Constantinople Bar Association, the Italian Chamber of Commerce, the Ottoman Bank on its upper floor between 1856 and 1893, a mustard producer, and a denim workshop under the Muhteşem Kot brand, lit. 'Gorgeous Jeans'.

In the late 19th and early 20th centuries, Saint Pierre Han was a favorite venue for architecture firms, including those of Alexander Vallaury (1850–1921), Hovsep Aznavur (1854–1935), Giulio Mongeri (1873–1951), as well as Alexandre Neocosmos (also known as Yenidünya), the interior designer of the ornate Freige Apartments building in Istanbul. While working there, Vallaury had a plaque affixed on the building to commemorate the birth on that site of André Chénier in 1762.

In 2011, the Bahçeşehir Uğur Education Foundation (Turkish: Bahçeşehir Uğur Eğitim Vakfı), sponsor of Bahçeşehir University, started renting the property with plans to install a conservatory. It later developed plans to renovate it jointly with Istanbul Municipality, and repurpose it as a cultural center.

== See also ==
- Catholic church of Saint George, Istanbul, also held by the Dominicans in the 15th and 16th centuries

== Sources ==
- Mamboury, Ernest (1953). The Tourists' Istanbul. Istanbul: Çituri Biraderler Basımevi.
- Janin, Raymond (1953). La Géographie Ecclésiastique de l'Empire Byzantin. 1. Part: Le Siège de Constantinople et le Patriarcat Oecuménique. 3rd Vol. : Les Églises et les Monastères (in French). Paris: Institut Français d'Etudes Byzantines.
- Müller-Wiener, Wolfgang (1977). Bildlexikon Zur Topographie Istanbuls: Byzantion, Konstantinupolis, Istanbul Bis Zum Beginn D. 17 Jh (in German). Tübingen: Wasmuth. ISBN 978-3-8030-1022-3.
- Schmitt, Oliver Jens (2005). Levantiner. Lebenswelten und Identitäten einer ethnokonfessionellen Gruppe im osmanischen Reich im langen 19. Jahrhundert (in German). Munich: Oldenbourg Verlag. ISBN 978-3-486-57713-6.
- Ceracchi, Mattia (2016). La comunità latino-cattolica di Istanbul nella prima età ottomana (1453-1696). Spazi sacri, luoghi di culto (Thesis). Sapienza University of Rome.
