= Ufuk Esin =

Turkish archaeologist

- Born: 11 October 1933; İzmir, Turkey
- Died: 19 January 2008 (aged 74); Istanbul, Turkey
- Known for: Pioneering archaeometry in Turkey; Excavations at Aşıklı Höyük

Academic background
- Education: Boğaziçi Lisesinde; St. George's Austrian High School; Istanbul University
- Thesis: Kuantitatif Spektral Analiz Yardımıyla Anadolu’da Başlangıcından Asur Koloni Çağına Kadar Bakır ve Tunç Maden Eserler (1960)
- Doctoral advisor: Kurt Bittel
- Other advisor: Halet Çambel

Academic work
- Discipline: Archaeology
- Sub-discipline: Prehistoric archaeology; Archaeometallurgy
- Institutions: Istanbul University (1957–2008)

Ufuk Esin (11 October 1933 – 19 January 2008) was a Turkish archaeologist known for pioneering archaeological science in Turkey and for her excavations at Aşıklı Höyük. She was a professor at Istanbul University from 1966 until her retirement in 2000 and was instrumental in founding the Turkish Academy of Sciences.

== Education and career ==
Esin was born in İzmir on 11 October 1933, but spent most of her life in Istanbul. She attended the Boğaziçi Lisesinde and St. George's Austrian High School. She enrolled at Istanbul University in 1952, initially taking the examinations to study literature, but was inspired to transfer to the newly-founded Department of Prehistory after hearing lectures by Kurt Bittel. One of only two students to enrol that year, she became the university's first graduate in prehistory in 1956. She then joined the department as Bittel's assistant whilst beginning her doctoral studies.

Bittel sent Esin to the University of Stuttgart to study archaeometallurgy with S. Junghans. There she developed an expertise in the spectral analysis of ancient metals, as well as a general passion for archaeological science that would continue throughout her career. She went on to complete a thesis on prehistoric copper and bronze mining in Anatolia and was awarded a doctorate in 1960. She was appointed an associate professor (Turkish: doçent) at Istanbul in 1966, and later rose to become a full professor (1976); head of the department of prehistory (1984–2000); and head of the department of archaeology and art history (1998–2000).

== Awards and honours ==
- Fulbright Scholarship, 1961
- Alexander von Humboldt Scholarship, 1973
