= St. George's Austrian High School =

Location
- Kart Çınar Sokak No. 2; 34420 Karaköy; Istanbul; Turkey; 41°01′28″N 28°58′25″E

Information
- Type: Private coeducational gymnasium
- Established: 1882; 144 years ago
- Principal: Gernot Grabher
- Faculty: 45 Austrian (Austria); 25 Turkish (Turkey)
- Grades: Prep, 9 – 12
- Enrollment: ca. 620
- Campus: Urban
- Colour: Red White
- Website: http://www.sg.k12.tr
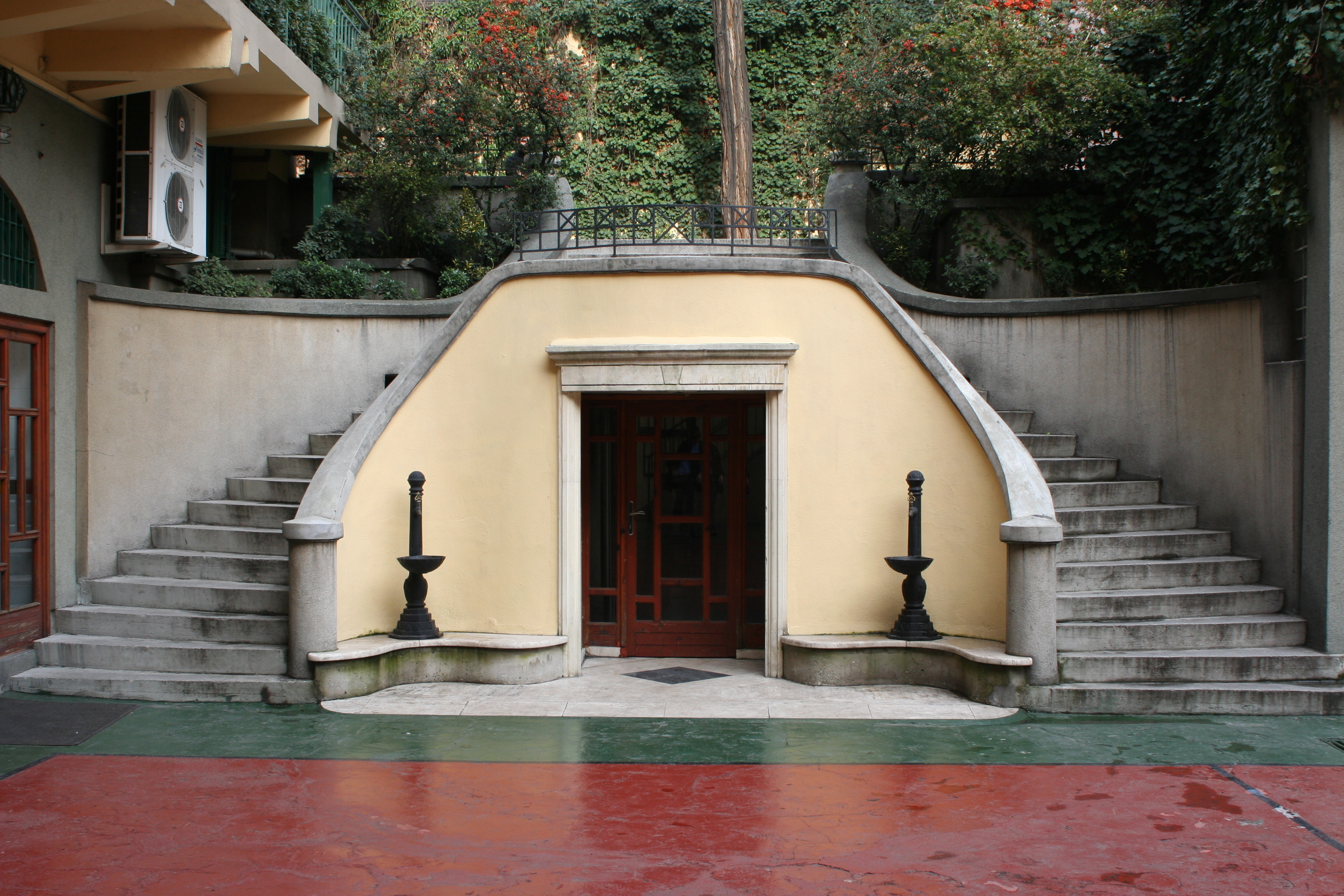
- Stairs connecting the former boys' and girls' courtyards

St. George's Austrian High School (Turkish: Sankt Georg Avusturya Lisesi, German: Österreichisches Sankt Georgs-Kolleg) is a private Austrian-Turkish high school located in Karaköy, Beyoğlu, Istanbul, Turkey. It is one of several secondary schools that were founded by European or American missions in Turkey during the 19th century, but were then secularized after the founding of the modern Turkish Republic in 1923.

Today, the school is subject to regulation by the Turkish Ministry of National Education, and almost its entire student body is Turkish, but a large part of its administrative and teaching staff remains Austrian, appointed by the Ministry of Education, Science and Research), and it offers a mixture of Turkish and Austrian curricula in a bilingual environment.

== History ==
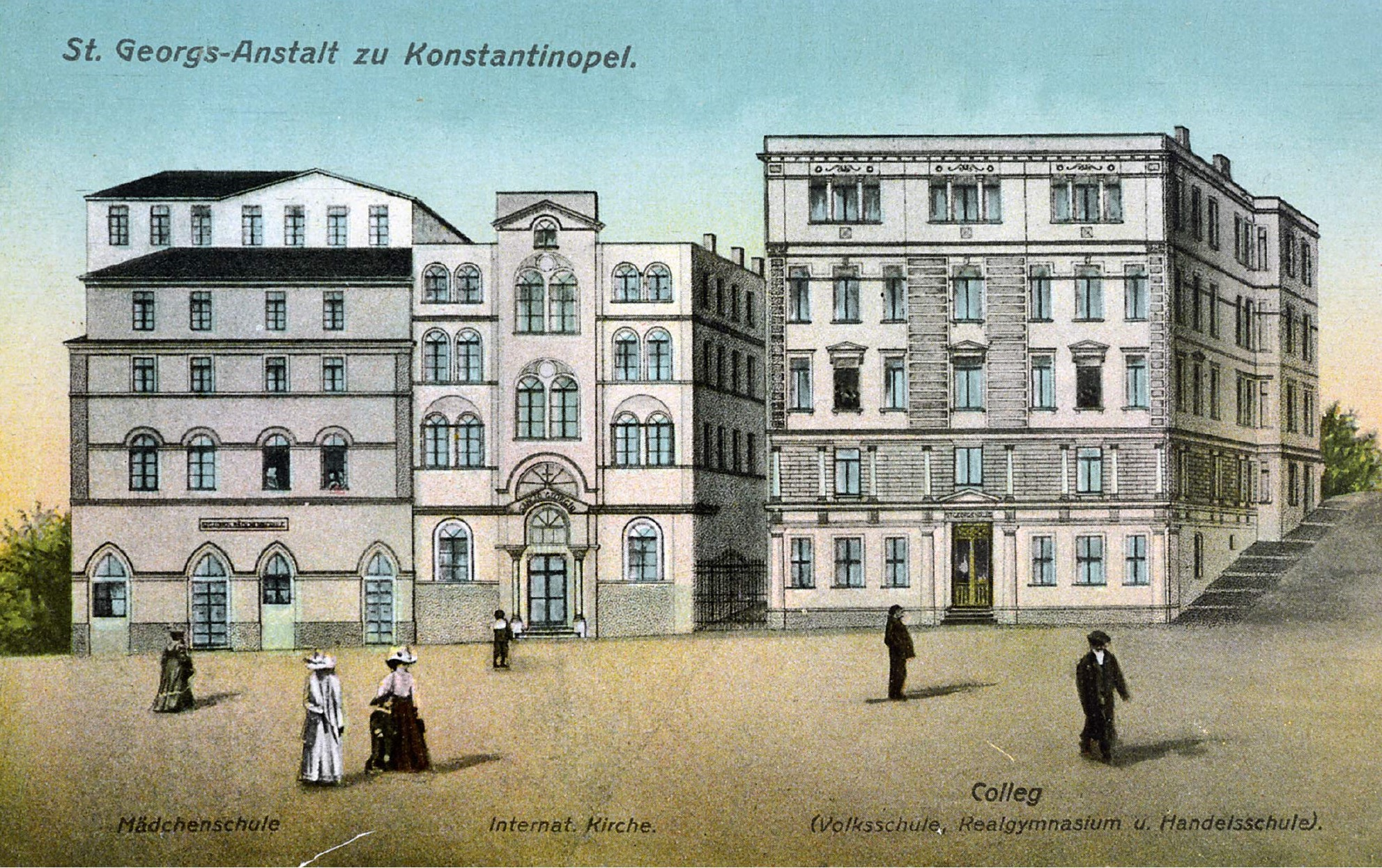
The school and church complex in 1900.

Sankt Georg was founded in 1882 by Austrian Lazarists and was originally intended for German-speaking Catholic children living in the Ottoman Empire. After the Ottoman (and Austrian) defeat in World War I, the school was ordered closed by the occupying Triple Entente forces in Istanbul, and all of its staff was sent back to Austria. The school was reopened shortly afterwards when the Republic of Turkey was founded in 1923. After the annexation of Austria by the Nazi Germany in 1938, the school turned into a "German school" and it was closed once again in 1944, due to the freezing of relations between Turkey and Germany. It was reopened in 1947. In 1995, the girls' and boys' schools were merged.

== Curriculum ==
The school combines both the Austrian and the Turkish curricula to prepare its students for the Turkish and Austrian school leaving examinations and to enrich their general knowledge. Under the current curriculum, students at Sankt Georg can learn up to three foreign languages. German and English are the two compulsory foreign languages taught at Sankt Georg.

Aside from these two languages, students can choose either Latin or French as their third foreign language. Most subjects, including math, sciences, philosophy and arts, are taught in German by Austrian teachers, but subjects related to Turkish culture and language, such as Turkish literature, history and geography, are taught in Turkish by Turkish teachers. Students learn German in a compulsory one-year preparatory program.

== School-leaving qualifications offered ==
- Turkish High School Diploma (Milli Eğitim Bakanlığı Lise Diploması)
- Austrian Matura: Students wishing to pursue their tertiary education at universities in Austria, or in the European Union, have the right to sit the Austrian Reifeprüfung examination at Sankt Georg. Once students pass the examination, they obtain the Matura certificate, which is equivalent to International Baccalaureate (IB).

== School library ==
The current school library opened in 1988, after 2 small libraries within the school building were brought together. As of 2020, it contains more than 26,000 books, 20 periodicals and magazines in Turkish, German and English, and CDs/DVDs.

== Alumni event ==
Alumni of Sankt Georg gather every year in the last week of April at a re-union called "Strudeltag". Another annual re-union is organised around May in Vienna, which is intended for the graduates of Sankt Georg living and studying in Austria or in other European countries.

== Notable alumni ==
- Ian F. Akyildiz, Ken Byers Chair Professor in Telecommunications at Georgia Institute of Technology
- Aret Güzel Aleksanyan, founder of Vienna Interkul Theater (German: Wiener Interkul Theater), recipient of the 2008 Vienna City Gold Medal for Outstanding Service
- Zerrin Arbaş, actress and Best Model of Turkey 1965
- Defne Ayas, museum director, curator
- Cenk Aydin, banker and entrepreneur
- Rutkay Aziz, actor and director
- Zeyno Baran, senior fellow at the Hudson Institute
- Enis Berberoğlu, chief-editor of the Hürriyet daily
- Gültekin Çizgen, photography artist
- Cansu Demirci, actress
- Kenan Ece, actor
- Burak Elmas, former president of Galatasaray S.K.
- Ufuk Esin, archaeologist
- Leyla Gediz, painter, arts exhibition curator
- Ömer Göksel, composer, jazz musician
- Meral Güneyman, musician and pianist
- Mehmet Gürel, writer, singer
- Zeynep Damla Gürel, special advisor to the head of state in European affairs; former deputy of Republican People's Party (CHP)
- Tunç Hamarat, World Correspondence Chess Champion (1999-2004)
- Ediz Hun, actor and MP
- Mustafa Iscel, Austrian People's Party (ÖVP) MP
- Mine Ayşe Karamehmet, founder of the art schools, Atölyedans and Atölyemüzik
- Mustafa Koç, industrialist and businessman, member of Koç family
- Alev Korun, the first Turkish MP in the Austrian Parliament
- Petros Markaris, Greek-Armenian author
- Mehmetcan Mincinozlu, actor
- Ulaş Moğultay, board member at Türkiye İş Bankası
- İlber Ortaylı, historian
- Fatih Özgüven, author, literary translator and columnist
- Tezer Özlü, translator and writer
- Murat Ses, musician and keyboard player, founding member of Moğollar, Grammy Voting Member, Billboard charting artist
- Nijad Sirel, writer
- Ahmet Tulgar, writer and journalist
- Merva Ulusoy, program editor and presenter for the show Headquarters on CNN Türk
- Mesut Yılmaz, former Prime Minister of Turkey (1991; 1996; 1997–1999)

== See also ==
- Catholic church of Saint George, Istanbul
- List of high schools in Turkey
- Education in the Ottoman Empire
