= Fossati brothers =

Swiss architects

Gaspare Fossati
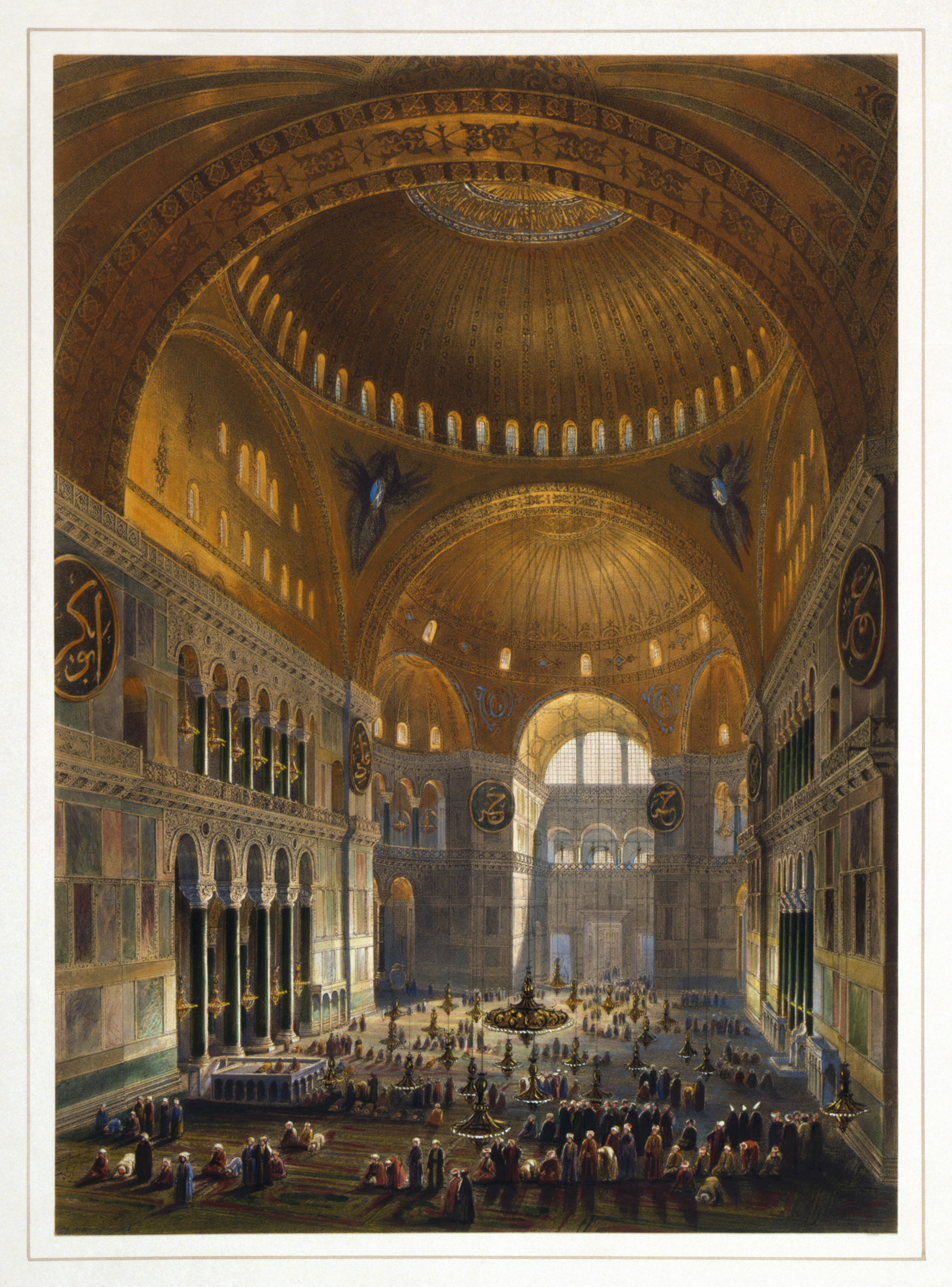
- Gaspare Fossati's 1852 depiction of the Ayasofya Mosque, which he and his brother renovated. Lithograph by Louis Haghe
- Born: 7 October 1809; Ticino, Switzerland
- Died: 5 September 1883 (aged 73); Morcote, Switzerland
- Education: Brera Academy, Milan
- Known for: Architect
- Movement: Orientalist

Giuseppe Fossati
- Born: 1822; Ticino, Switzerland
- Died: 1891 (aged 68–69)
- Education: Brera Academy, Milan
- Known for: Architect
- Movement: Orientalist

The Fossati brothers, Gaspare (7 October 1809 – 5 September 1883) and Giuseppe (1822–1891), were Italian-Swiss architects. They completed more than 50 projects in Turkey (then the Ottoman Empire) during the Tanzimat era. They belonged to the Morcote branch of the Fossati, a prominent Ticinese family with mentions in the historical record going back to the 14th century. Gaspare is most noted for his renovation of the Hagia Sophia in Constantinople, which virtually saved it from destruction.

== Biography ==
Born in Ticino, Gaspare and Giuseppe Fossati were born into a notable family of artisans from Morcote in the Ticino region. Their ancestors included architects, artists and engineers.

The brothers finished primary and middle school in Venice and studied architecture at the Brera Academy in Milan. During his period at the Academy, Gaspare won many prizes. Between 1829 and 1831, Gaspare produced many lithographs of Rome and produced a catalogue for Leon XII. In around 1833, Gaspare began working for the architectural team of Luigi Rusca in Saint Petersburg, and in 1837, he married Rusca's daughter. (Rusca had died in 1822, but his nephew carried on with Rusca's projects in Saint Petersburg.)

At the end of 1836, Gaspare was appointed to Constantinople (modern-day Istanbul), becoming the official court architect and agreed to draw up plans for the Russian Embassy in Constantinople. He recruited his brother-in-law, Alessandro Rusca, and his own 17-year-old brother, Giuseppe Fossati. He set sail from Odessa, arriving in Constantinople on 20 March 1837. The Fossati brothers' time in Constantinople would mark the beginning of a very productive period, and Gaspare would enjoy a distinguished career there.

Between 1841 and 1843, the Fossati brothers built the brick Bab-ı Seraskeri Hospital (Bekirağa Bölüğü) and Liman İskelesi Karakolu in Eminönü for the Ottoman Administration. They were appointed to renovate Arzuodası at Babıali in 1844, and to build important buildings in Sultanahmet such as Dârülfünun (university) (1845–1846), Hazine-i Evrak, and Mekteb-i Sanayi (1846–1848). They also built the Church of SS Peter and Paul between 1841 and 1843.

In 1847, Sultan Abdülmecid appointed them to renovate the Hagia Sophia. They completed the restoration in two years, utilizing more than eight hundred workers. They were able to document a larger number of Byzantine mosaics whose precise location within the Hagia Sophia today have not been fully documented since many were either painted over or destroyed, often without recording their original location. The drawings of the Hagia Sophia mosaics are kept in the Cantonal Archive of Ticino. Sultan Abdülmecid allowed the brothers to also document any mosaics they might discover during this process which were later archived in Swiss libraries.

The Telgrafhane-i Amire was built by Giuseppe Fossati in 1855. Upon the death of Reşit Paşa in 1858, the Fossati brothers built his mausoleum in the corner of the graveyard in the Bayezit complex. They also renovated the Palace of Venice (today the house of the Italian Ambassador) in 1853, and the Dutch Embassy in Beyoğlu in 1854. They built the Spanish (1854) and Iranian (1856) embassies in Istanbul and the Ottoman University, adjacent to the Hagia Sophia. In addition, they built three Italian theatres. One of them was the Naum Theatre, which was built in Galatasaray in 1846, and destroyed by a fire in 1870.

In 1858, the Fossati brothers returned to Switzerland. They built their homes in Morcote in the Turkish style. They are buried in Morcote.

== Works in Constantinople ==
- Russian Embassy (1837)
- Dârülfünun (1846)
- Hazine-i Evrak Building (1846)
- Hagia Sophia restoration (1847–49)
- Bekir Ağa Bölüğü (1841–1843; now the Faculty of Political Sciences at Istanbul University)
- Reşid Paşa Palace (1847)
- Lamartine (1850)
- Old Darülfünun building (1854)
- Hünkâr Dairesi (1855; now the Social Facility at Istanbul University)
- Church of Santa Maria, Istanbul (1864–1866)
- Ottoman Ministry of General Education (1865), now the TGC Press Media Museum
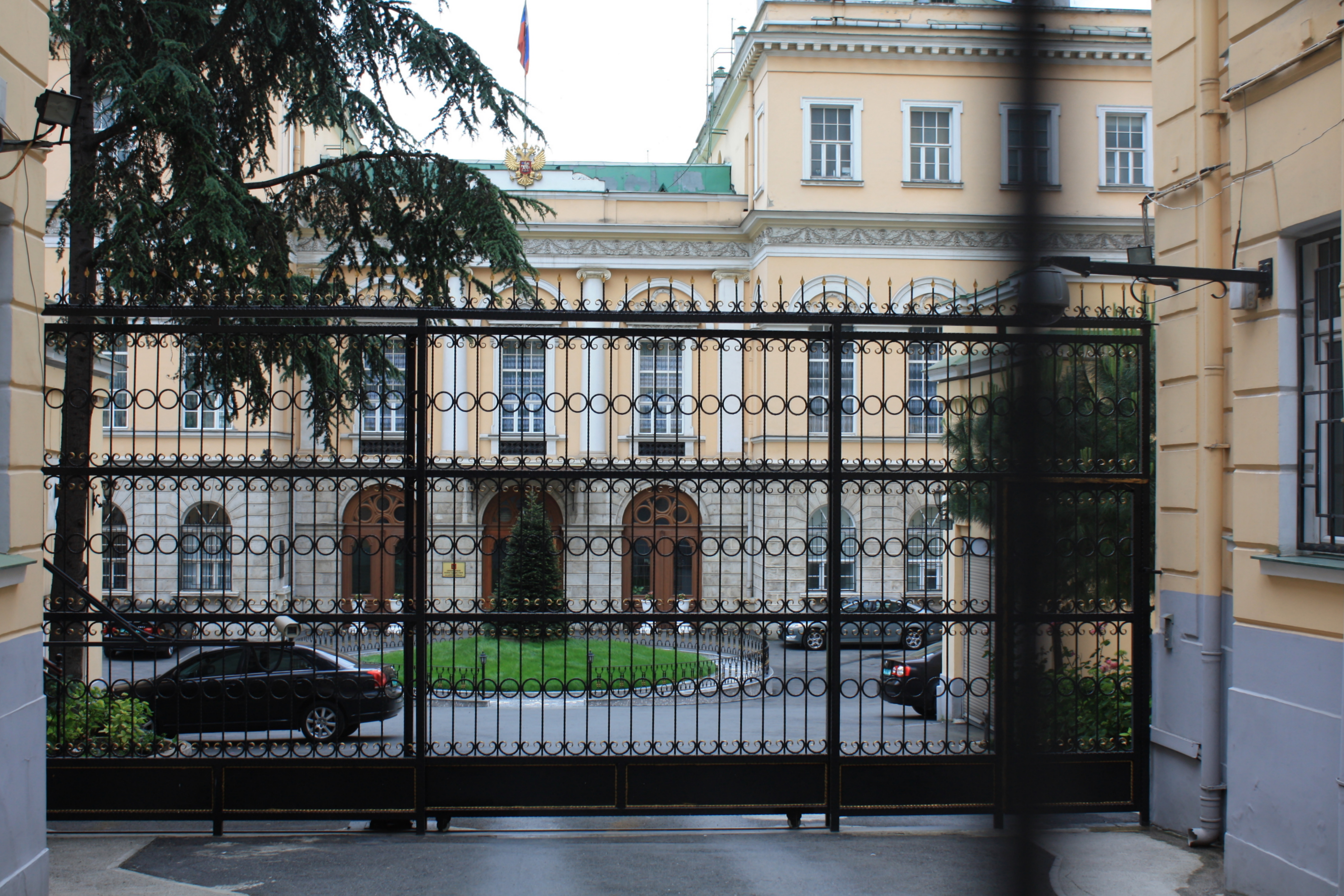
Consulate (former embassy) of Russia on Istiklal Avenue in Istanbul

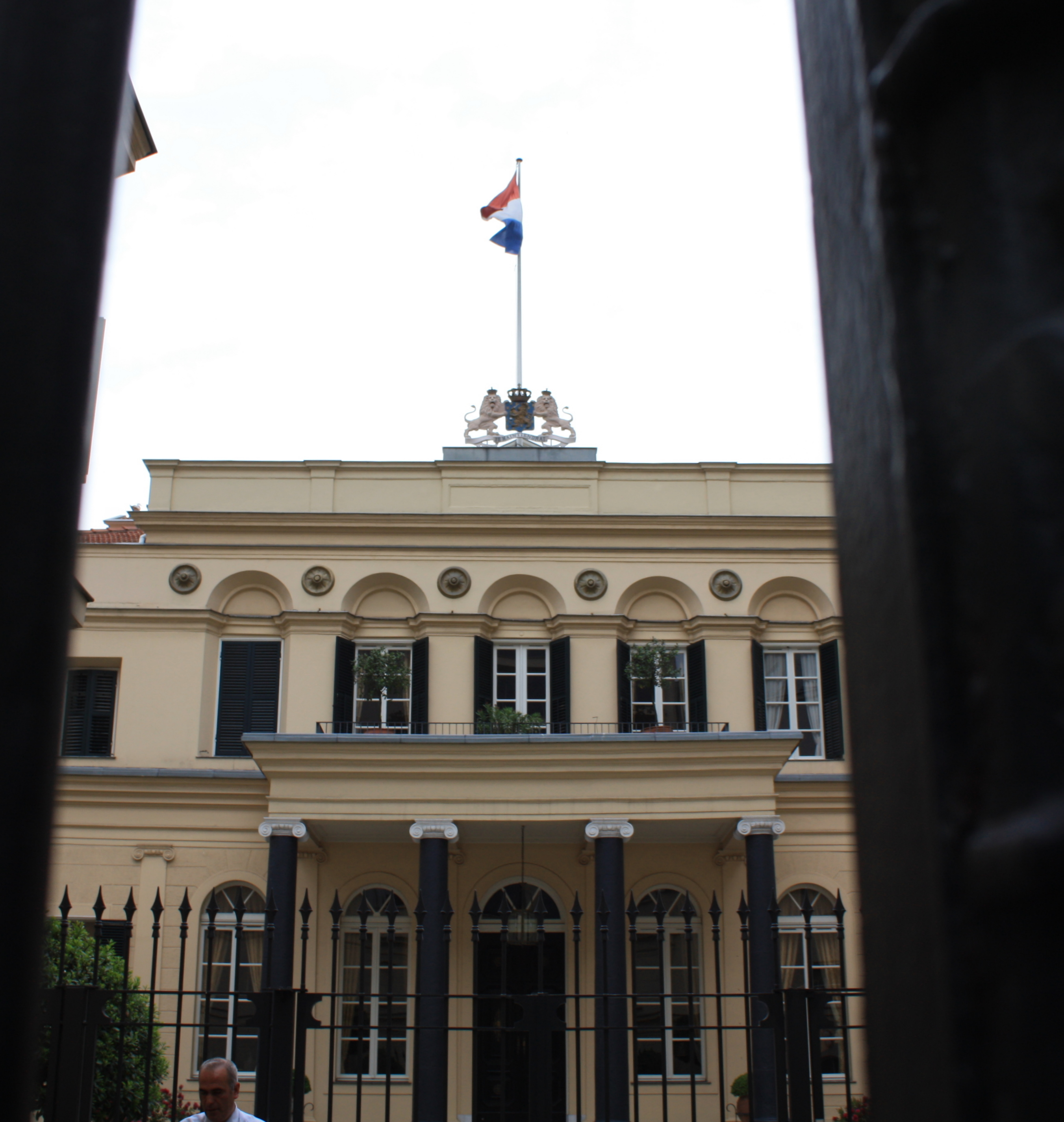
Consulate (former embassy) of the Netherlands on Istiklal Avenue in Istanbul

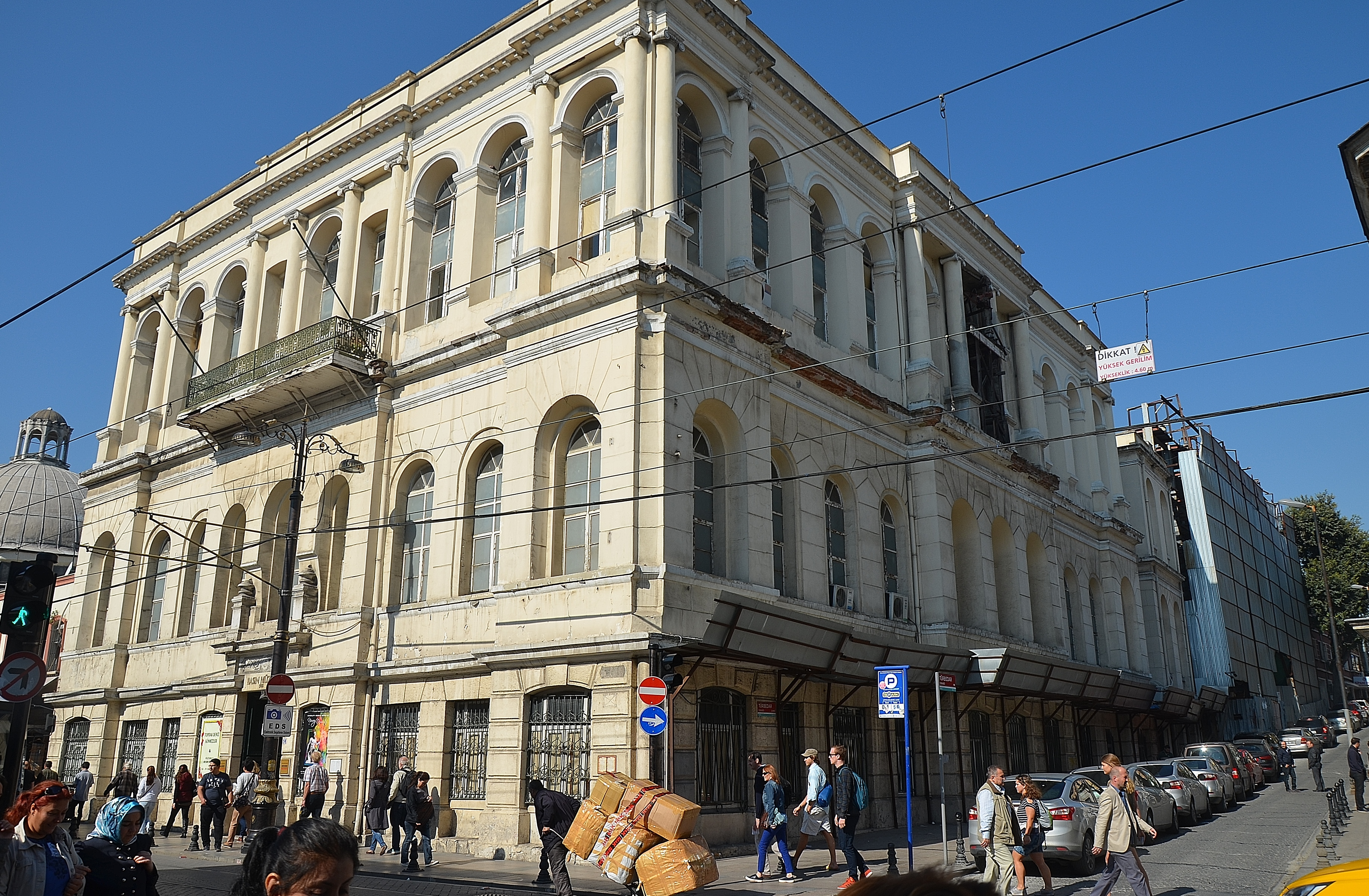
TGC Press Media Museum in Çemberlitaş, Fatih (former Ottoman Ministry of General Education)

== See also ==
- List of Orientalist artists
- Orientalism
