= Michal Elia Kamal =

Israeli musician

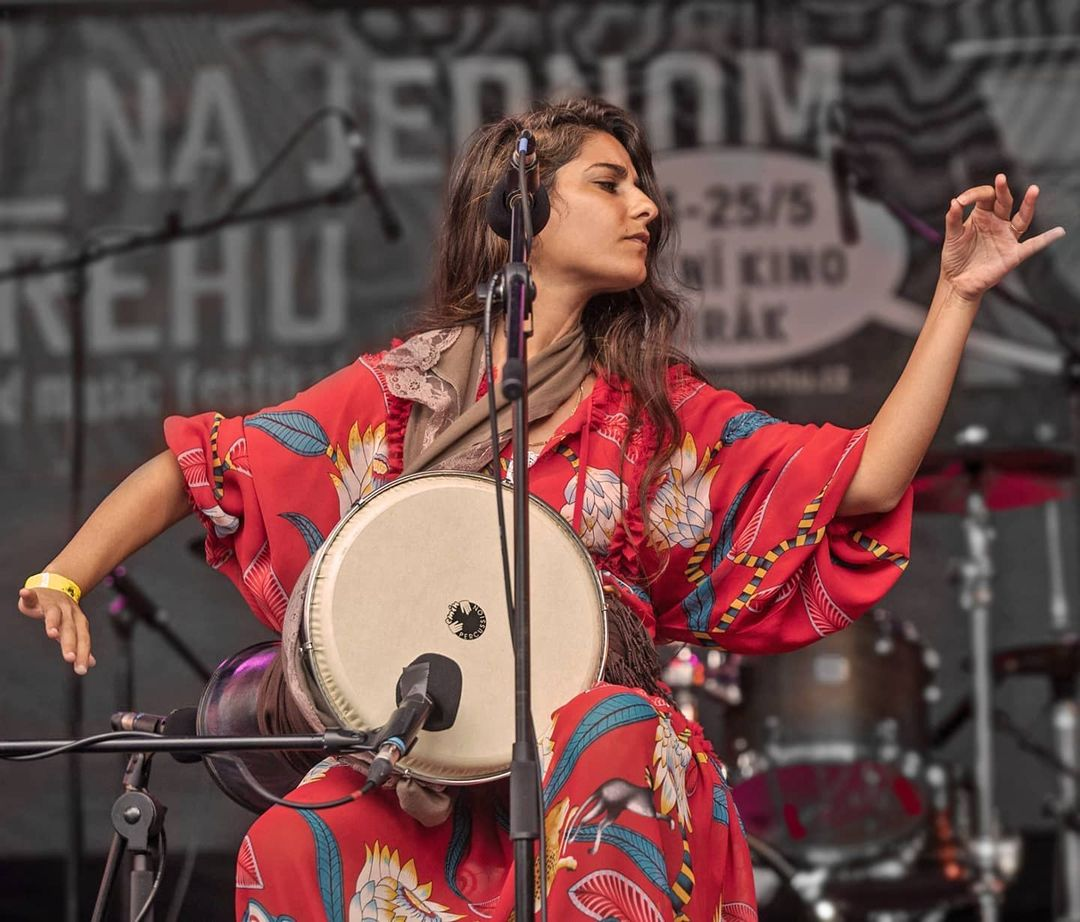
Image of Michal Kamal

Michal Elia Kamal (Hebrew: מיכל אליה קמל; born on July 27, 1987) is an Israeli musician, singer-songwriter, actress and percussionist, who has resided in Istanbul since 2010. She is known as the frontwoman of Light in Babylon, and she performs in both Hebrew and Turkish.

== Biography ==
Michal Elia Kamal was born in Tel Aviv, Israel, to a Persian Jewish family that had left their historical native country due to Iranian Islamic Revolution of 1979. She was raised both in Persian and Israeli culture. Her father's family is from Tehran, and her maternal family is from Isfahan. Michal has two sisters, older and younger. She grew up in the Ramat Aviv's Ashkenazi neighborhood.

She met her future husband, French Guitarist Julien Demarque in the Balkans. The couple arrived in Istanbul in 2010 and started to search for a santourist. They finally found Metehan Çiftçi and started the band Light in Babylon. They began to perform on the İstiklal Avenue gathering gradually International fame with their 'wistful Oriental music'.

Michal Elia Kamal has also acted in a Turkish film called Güvercin (The Pigeon) (2018).
