= Russian Palace, Istanbul =

Historic building in Istanbul

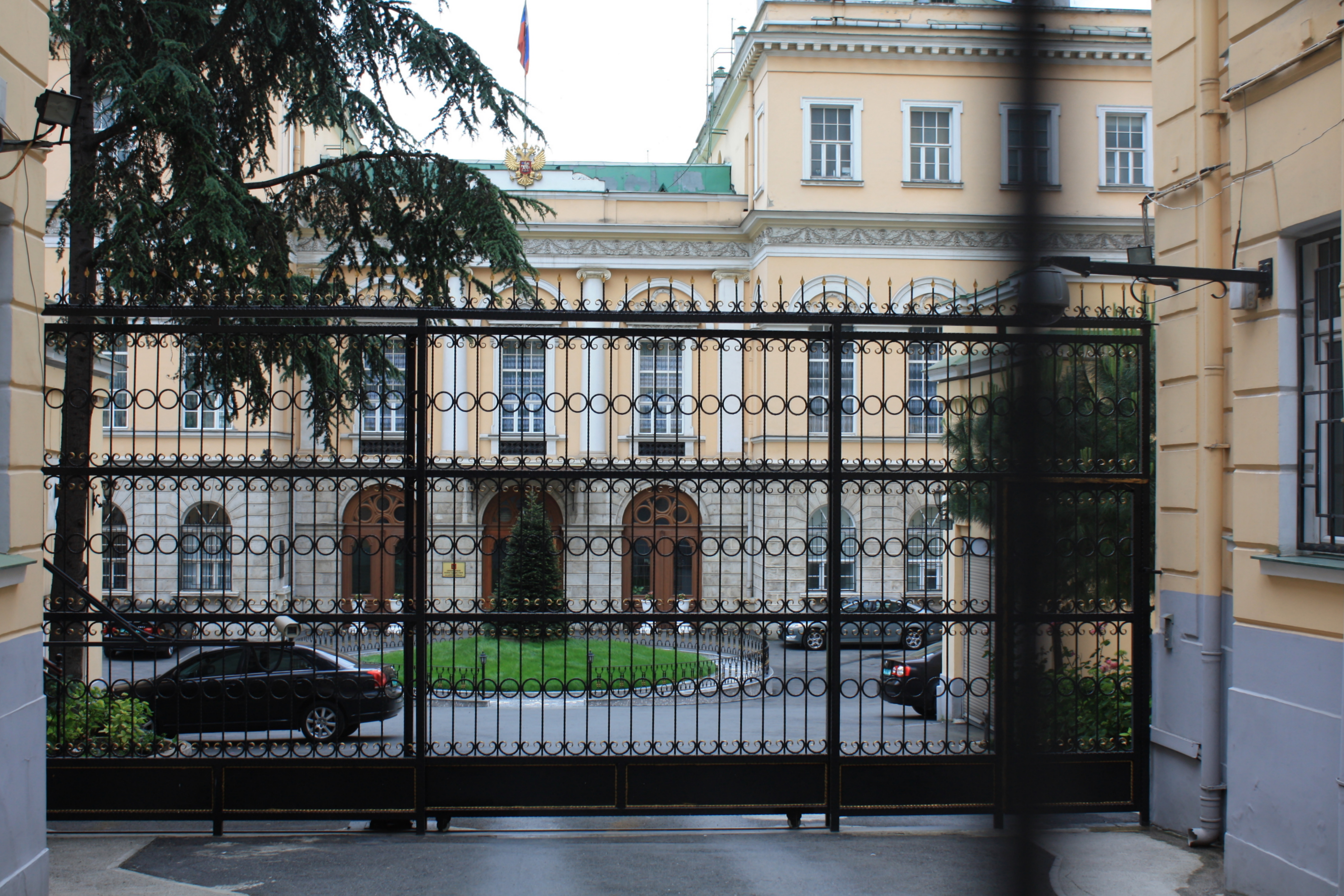
Russian Palace, viewed from İstiklal Avenue in 2011

The Russian Palace (Turkish: Rus Sarayı) is a historic property facing İstiklal Avenue in the Beyoğlu (formerly Pera) neighborhood of Istanbul, Turkey. From the 18th century to the early 1910s, it has been the seat of diplomatic missions of the Russian Empire to the Ottoman Empire. Following the disappearance of both empires in 1917 and 1922 respectively, it was recovered by the Soviet Union, which relocated its embassy to the new capital of Ankara. The Russian Palace has subsequently served as the Soviet, then Russian consulate-general in Istanbul, as well as a residence for the ambassador when in town.

The building was originally built of wood and was altered repeatedly following episodes of fire and disrepair, and the current structure mostly results from reconstruction in the early 1840s.

== History ==
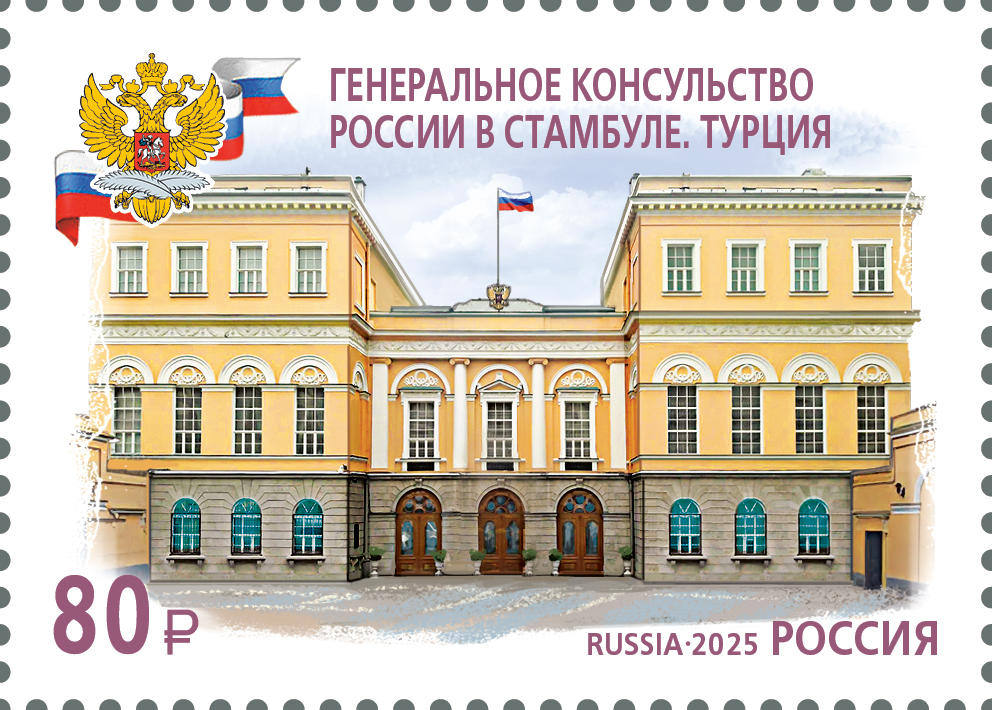
Russian stamp featuring the Russian Palace, 2025

Russia first purchased land in the mid-18th century for its diplomatic mission. The first building was destroyed by fire in 1767, and its replacement was in turn destroyed by another fire in the early 1820s. Eventually, Russia decided to rebuild it and entrusted its reconstruction to architect Gaspare Fossati who moved from Russia for that assignment in 1837. The new building was completed in 1845.

During the Crimean War, the building housed an officers' hospital for coalition troops. In 1894, the building was seriously damaged by an earthquake. In 1905, it was damaged again during a severe hurricane.

In the 1920s, the building housed a hospital for wounded officers of the White Army. The RSFSR then established diplomatic relations with Turkey and the building became home to the Soviet Consulate General. The coat of arms of the Russian Empire was subsequently removed.

The property was renovated in the early 2000s, when its external color was changed from red to a more discreet yellow. The Russian coat of arms with double-headed eagle was placed again in 2005. On 1 June 2006, a memorial plaque in memory of Konstantin Leontiev was installed on the building.

The palace's garden are adjacent with those of the Palace of Venice downhill.

== See also ==
- Eastern question
- List of ambassadors of Russia to Turkey
- List of diplomatic missions of Russia
