= Tokatlıyan Hotels =

Hotels in Istanbul, Turkey

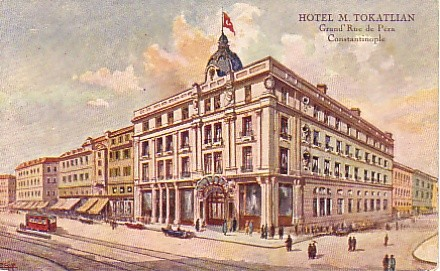
- Tokatlıyan Hotel on Rue de Pera (Istiklal Caddesi) in Beyoğlu
- Interactive map of the Tokatlıyan Hotels area

General information
- Location: Istanbul, Turkey
- Opening: 1897

The Tokatlıyan Hotels, founded by Meguerditch Tokatliyan, were two prominent luxury hotels located in Istanbul. Many famous individuals such as Leon Trotsky and Mustafa Kemal Atatürk stayed in one or other of them. They were among the first European-style hotels to be built in Turkey.

== History ==
The Tokatlıyan Hotels were founded by Meguerditch Tokatliyan, an Ottoman citizen of Armenian descent, who moved from Tokat to Istanbul in 1883 and adopted the last name Tokatlıyan meaning 'from Tokat'. Meguerditch Tokatliyan eventually settled in Nice, France, where he lived the rest of his life.

=== Beyoğlu branch ===
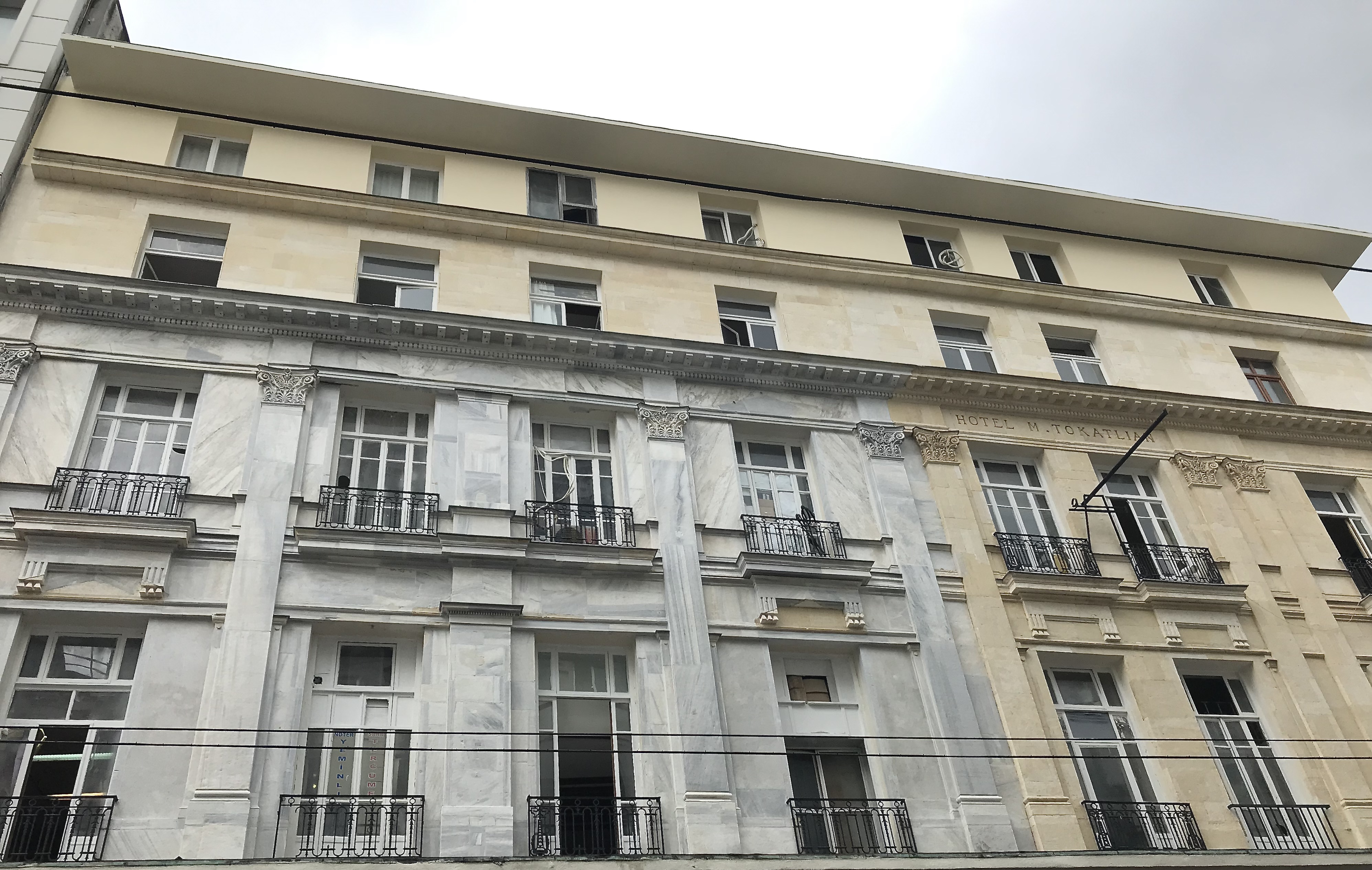
Facade of Tokatlıyan Hotel on İstiklal Caddesi in Beyoğlu in 2021 after restoration.

Meguerditch established the first Tokatlıyan Hotel in 1897 on the Rue de Pera (modern Istiklal Caddesi) in Pera, Beyoğlu. Originally known as Hotel Splendide, the hotel was soon renamed Hotel Tokatlıyan. It originally had 160 rooms and its furnishings were brought from Europe. The hotel contained high-ceiling halls and rooms and it also had its own coat of arms made with silver which was placed all around the hotel. The hotel was a popular venue for members of Istanbul high society for a long time. Many famous individuals such as Leon Trotsky, Josephine Baker, and Mustafa Kemal Atatürk were guests of the hotel. Atatürk considered it his favourite hotel.

During the First World War and the Armenian genocide, the hotel was vandalised and its windows were broken. In 1919 it was passed over to the Serbian businessman Nikola Medović On 4 November 1922, Ali Kemal, the liberal newspaper editor and former Minister of the Interior, was kidnapped from the barber shop at the hotel. He was taken to the Asiatic side of the city and lynched by Republican forces.

Subsequently, the hotel passed into the ownership of the Turkish businessman İbrahim Gültan, who changed its name to Konak. By the 1950s, lack of maintenance had left the hotel run-down and in a deteriorating state. The Üç Horan (Holy Trinity) Armenian Church then bought the property.

Today, the building still stands in its original location near the Çiçek Pasajı. Shops occupy much of the ground floor while most of the upper floors are off-limits. In 2022 its facade was restored.

=== Tarabya Branch ===
Tokatlıyan Hotel in Tarabya

After the success of the first Tokatlıyan hotel, Meguerditch Tokatliyan opened another branch at Tarabya in 1909 on a site long occupied by a hotel, first by the Hotel Petala and then the Hotel d'Angleterre (Tarabya was a popular retreat from the heat of central İstanbul in summer with wealthy Turks and foreigners). It consisted of 120 rooms on the European shore of the Bosphorus. Like its predecessors on the site, the hotel became popular immediately. However, on April 19, 1954, it was badly damaged by fire. In 1964 the hotel was reconstructed and its name changed to the Büyük Tarabya (Grand Tarabya) Hotel.

== The Tokatliyan hotels in culture ==
The Tokatlıyan Hotel is mentioned in a number of books.

- Orhan Pamuk's The Black Book
- Agatha Christie's Parker Pyne Investigates and Murder on the Orient Express
- George Mardikian's Dinner at Omar Khayyam's
- Evelyn Waugh's Brideshead Revisited

The Tarabya branch has been used as a setting for numerous Turkish movies and TV shows such as Cici Gelin (The Good Bride), Acele Koca Aranıyor (Urgently Seeking a Husband), Arım Balım Peteğim, (My Bee, My Honey, My Honeycomb) and more.
