= Light in Babylon =

International music band

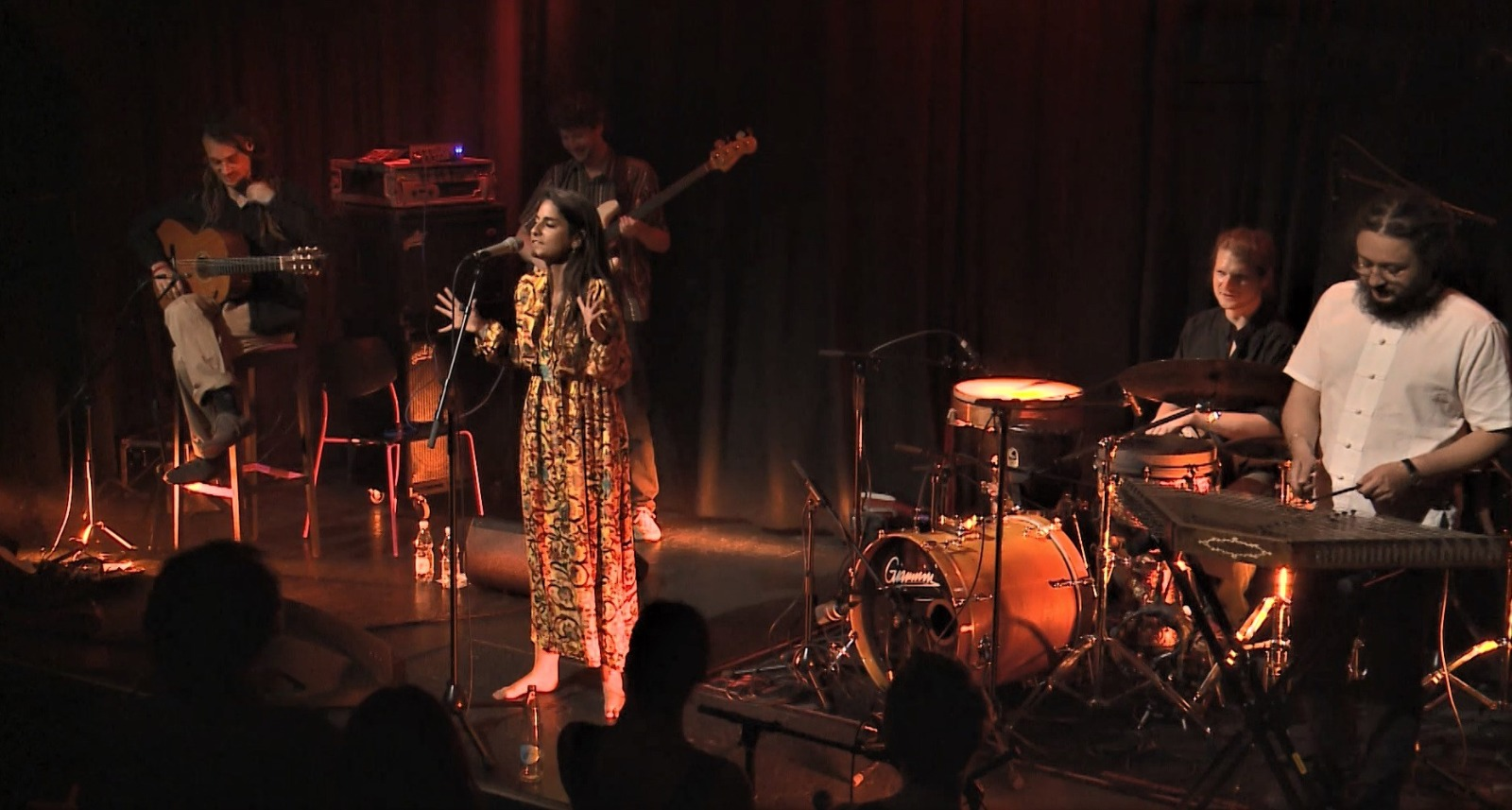
- Light in Babylon, Zürich, 2018

Background information
- Origin: Istanbul, Turkey
- Genres: World music, Mediterranean
- Years active: 2010–present
- Labels: Light in Babylon
- Members: Michal Elia Kamal; Julien Demarque; Metehan Çiftçi; Priam Arnoux; Stuart Dickson
- Website: lightinbabylon.com

Light in Babylon is an international band that formed in 2010, consisting of singer Michal Elia Kamal (Hebrew: מיכל אליה קמל), guitarist Julien Demarque, and santurist Metehan Çiftçi. Since 2017, the band has been joined by bassist Priam Arnoux, and drummer Stuart Dickson.

== History ==
While traveling in the Balkans, the female singer Michal Elia Kamal, an Israeli of Iranian heritage, met French guitarist Julien Demarque. Searching together for a santur player to join them, Michal and Julien encountered Turkish santurist Metehan Çiftçi as he was busking in Istanbul. The trio formed initially out of a casual jamming arrangement, in which each spoke different languages but found common ground in music.

The biblical story of the Tower of Babel inspired the band's moniker, alluding to how the medium of music enabled the three members to play together despite initial difficulties in communicating.

Light in Babylon played extensively on the Beyoğlu District’s Independence Avenue (İstiklal Caddesi), a thoroughfare known for music performances of diverse genres and instrumentation through which it is estimated that three million pedestrians pass each day.

== Musical styles and influences ==
The band’s style has been described as going beyond strict delineations of language and culture, and as welcoming of all audiences. Accordingly, their music is listed to across numerous intersections of identity, nationality, and religion internationally. Genres that have influenced the band’s style include Turkish music, Balkan songs, Mizrahi music, gypsy traditions, classical and pop music.

Songs are sung in various languages, combining Hebrew, Turkish, Persian, and English.

== Discography ==
=== Albums ===
Year	Album details
2010	Istanbul (demo): Release date: 2010; Label: Light in Babylon
2012	Life Sometimes Doesn't Give You Space: Release date: 2012; Label: Light in Babylon
2016	Yeni Dunya (Turkish for "New World"): Release date: 2016; Label: Light in Babylon
2022	On Our Way: Release date: 2022; Label: Light in Babylon

=== Music Videos ===
Year	Video details
2013	The Women of Teheran: Release date: September 28, 2013; Channel: TRT Haber
2015	Imagine: Release date: July 1, 2015; Director of Photography: Gültekin Tetik
2017	Ya Sahra: Release date: May 15, 2017; Co-producer: João Leitão
2018	Kipur: Release date: January 30, 2018; Director of Photography: Hasip Arvas

=== Features ===
Year	Video details
2013	İçimdeki Ses 8 Bölüm: Release date: May 26, 2013; Channel: İçimdeki Ses
2015	Canlı Performans TEDxReset: Release date: June 15, 2015; Channel: TEDx Talks
2015	Light in Babylon Documentary: Release date: August 4, 2015; Channel: ARTE
2020	Light in Babylon interview: Release date: April 4, 2020; Channel: AllatRa TV Russia
