= TGC Press Media Museum =

TCG Press Media Museum
- TCG Basın Müzesi
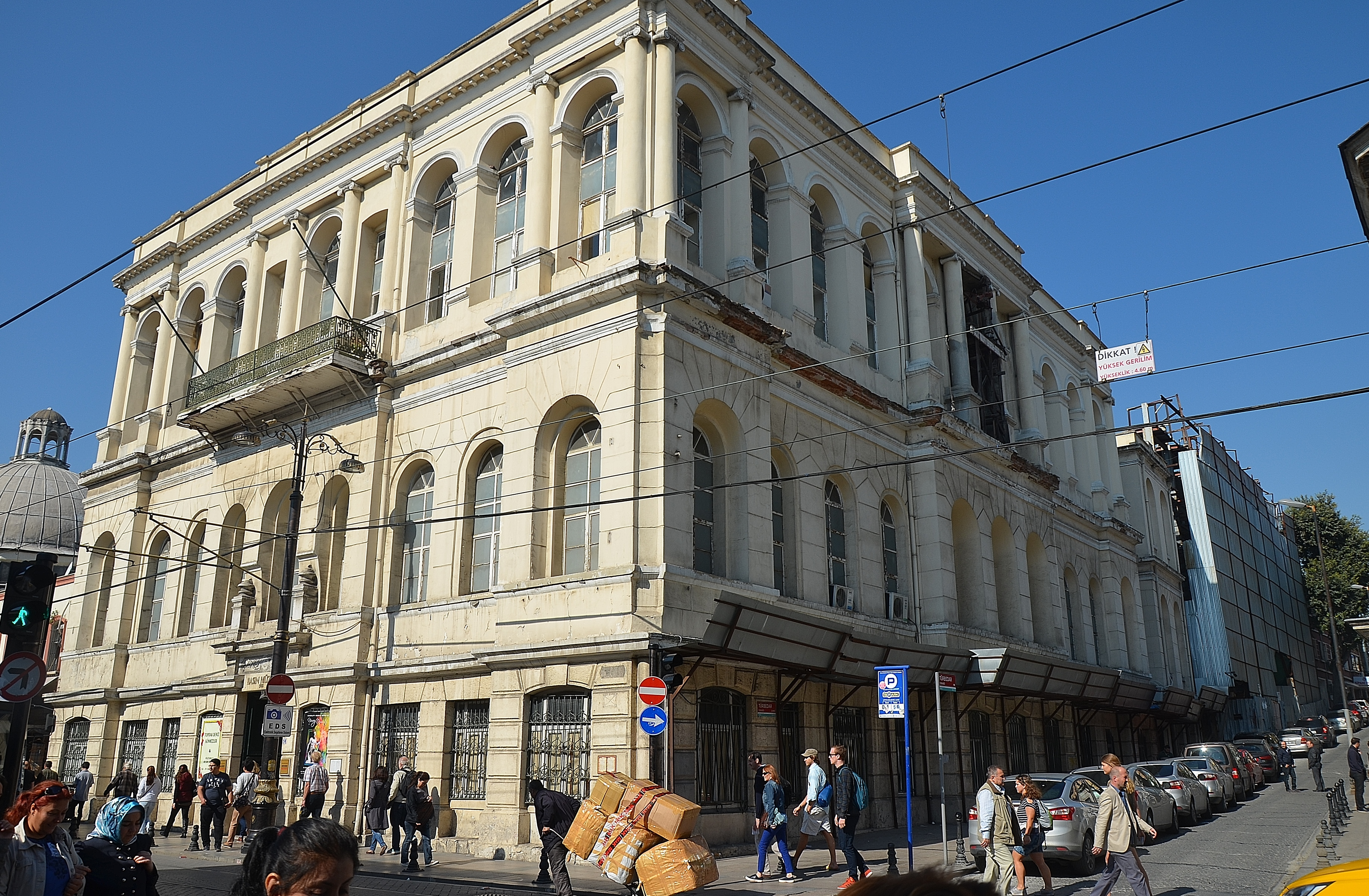
- TGC Press Media Museum in Istanbul

- Location of TGC Press Media Museum in Istanbul, Turkey.
- Established: May 9, 1988; 38 years ago
- Location: Divanyolu Cad. 76; 34122 Çemberlitaş, Fatih, Istanbul, Turkey
- Coordinates: 41.00844°N 28.97211°E
- Type: Media museum, technology museum
- Owner: Turkish Journalists' Association
- Public transit access: Tram line T1

The TGC Press Media Museum (Turkish: TGC Basın Müzesi), aka Istanbul Press Media Museum, is a history and technology museum dedicated to mass communication in Turkey featuring exhibitions about journalism. It is located in the Çemberlitaş neighborhood of Fatih district in Istanbul, Turkey. Established in 1988, it is owned and operated by the Journalists Association of Turkey (Turkish: Türkiye Gazeteciler Cemiyeti, TGC).

== History ==
In 1983, the mayor of Istanbul, Abdullah Tırtıl, and the board of the Journalists Association of Turkey, led by its president Nezih Demirkent (1930-2001), agreed to establish a museum for the press media. The historical four-storey building, which housed some departments of the city's municipality from 1908 to 1983, was assigned for this purpose. After completion of restoration works between 1984 and 1988, the museum was opened on May 9, 1988.

The museum building, was commissioned by Ottoman Minister Saffet Pasha and designed by the Swiss architects Fossati brothers, Gaspare (1809-1883) and Giuseppe (1822-1891), in neoclassical architecture in 1865. It served as the headquarters of the Ottoman Ministry of General Education (Ottoman Turkish: Maarif-i Umumiye Nezareti), and later for Istanbul University's predecessor Darülfünun. During the era of Sultan Abdul Hamid II (1876–1909), the building was used by the Censure Commission. In 1908, it was turned over to the municipality.

In 2010, the interior of the museum underwent a renovation.

== Collections ==
The museum offers display items showing the technological evolution of the press media from its beginnings, such as lithography examples and test benches from 1870, flat-bed printing press, Intertype rotary letterpress type casting machine from 1892, German-made offset printing machine and paper guillotine, old typewriters, telex machines and early examples of telephoto machines, further a 19th-century screw press. Diverse printing equipment used by the Anadolu Agency, the country's first official news agency are also on display.

The museum exhibits personal belongings of notable Turkish journalists, including Abdi İpekçi (1929–1979), Çetin Emeç (1935-1990), Cihad Baban (1911-1984), Sabiha Sertel (1895–1968), Zekeriya Sertel (1890-1980), Sedat Simavi (1896–1953) and Ahmet Emin Yalman (1888-1972).

Over 60 portraits in oil painting depicting people, who contributed to the journalism in the Ottoman Empire and Turkey, are found in the museum, such as of Abdi İpekçi, Agah Efendi (1832–1885), Agop Arad, Ahmet Ağaoğlu (1869–1939), Ahmed Cevdet Pasha (1822–1895), Ahmet Emin Yalman, Ahmet İhsan Tokgöz, Ahmet Mithat Efendi (1844—1913), Ahmet Rasim, Ahmet Samim, Ali Naci Karacan (1896–1955), Ali Suavi (1838–1878), Asım Us, Basiretçi Ali, Burhan Felek (1889–1982), Cemal Nadir, Cevat Fehmi Başkut, Cihat Baban, Çetin Emeç, Doğan Nadi Abalıoğlu, Ebuzziya Tevfik, Elif Naci, Ercüment Ekrem Talu, Hakkı Tarık Us, Hüseyin Cahit Yalçın (1875–1957), İ. Şinasi Bey, Ibrahim Muteferrika (1674–1745), Kadri Kayabal, Kazım Nami Duru, Mahmut Sadak, Mihran Efendi, Mustafa Yücel, Mümtaz Faik Fenik, Münif Fehim Özerman, Namık Kemal (1840–1888), Necmettin Sadak (1890–1953), Nezih Demirkent, Reşat Nuri Güntekin (1889–1956), Sabiha Sertel, Sait Kesler, Sedat Simavi, Şemsettin Sami (1850–1904), Teodor Kasap, Velid Ebuzziya, Yunus Nadi Abalıoğlu (1879–1945), Zekeriya Sertel.

A special section contains photographs of assassinated journalists from Hasan Fehmi in 1909 to Abdi Ipekçi in 1979 and Hrant Dink in 2007.

== Library and archive ==
The third floor of the museum consists of a rich library, archive and documentation center, which were reorganized in 1998. The library contains beside collections of newspapers and periodicals also books in printed or digital form. Publications cover media and press issues in history, socio-economic, education, culture and communication, social and psychological aspects. Library materials are arranged in Dewey Decimal Classification (DDC) as library classification system. The library has a reading room for 25 people.

Milestones in the history of the journalism in the Ottoman Empire and Turkey are documented with the first ever newspaper Vekayi-i Misriye published in 1828, proliferation of newspapers in the Second Constitutional Era (1908–1920), news on events like establishment of the national parliament (1920), proclamation of the Republic (1923), adoption of the Latin alphabet (1928) and delivery of Nutuk ("The Speech") by Mustafa Kemal Atatürk (1927).

Around 5,000 researchers make yearly use of the museum's library and archive.

== Exhibitions and events ==
The museum hosts various cultural events and art exhibitions. The Nezih Demirkent Auditorium at the third floor, used for meetings, conferences, seminars, panel discussions and symposia, can hold 100 persons.

The second floor of museum building has six separate showrooms in the Cevat Fehmi Başkut Art Gallery, where various exhibitions of arts such as painting, cartoon, ceramic, sculpture, engraving, gilding, miniature, calligraphy and paper marbling, are held changing in every 19 days.

An art workshop capable of up to 30 persons is available, where painting, plastic arts as well as artisanal handicraft such as miniature, calligraphy, illumination and tapestry can be performed.

A "pocket theatre" with 80 seats is used for staging mini plays.

== Access ==
The TGC Press Museum is situated in Divanyolu Street 76 at Çemberlitaş, not far from Cağaloğlu neighborhood, which was formerly the center of press media in Istanbul. The museum is accessible by the tram line T1 (Bağcılar-Kabataş).

The museum is open on workdays from 14:00 to 17:00 hours. Admission is free of charge. The art galleries and the art workshop are open on workdays and Saturdays between 10:00 and 18:00 hours. Admission is free.
