= Palazzo Venezia, Naples =

Building in Naples, Italy

Coordinates: 40.8480°N 14.2539°E

Palazzo Venezia
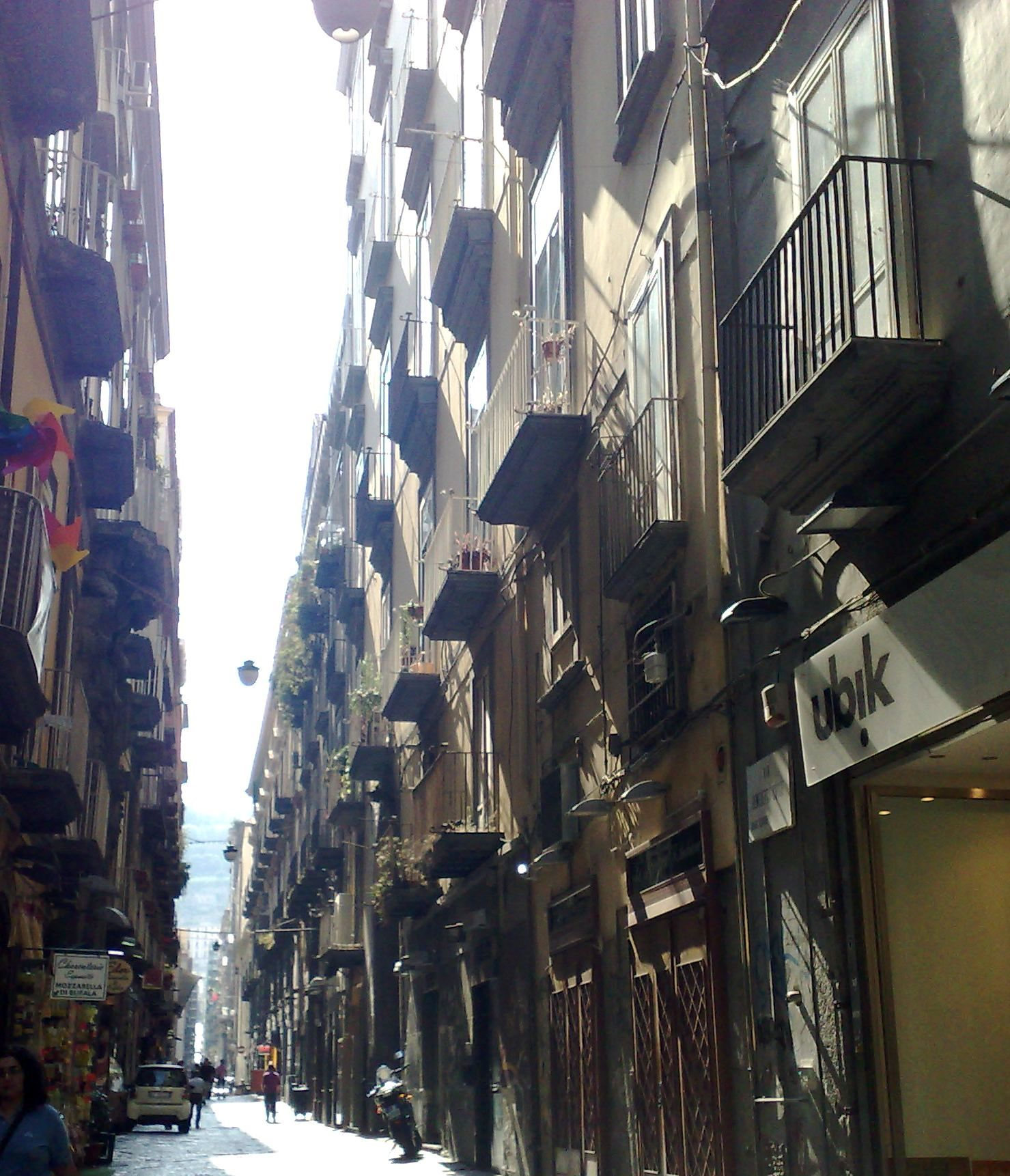
- The entrance of the building on Spaccanapoli
- Interactive map of the Palazzo Venezia area

General information
- Architectural style: neoclassical
- Location: Naples, Italy

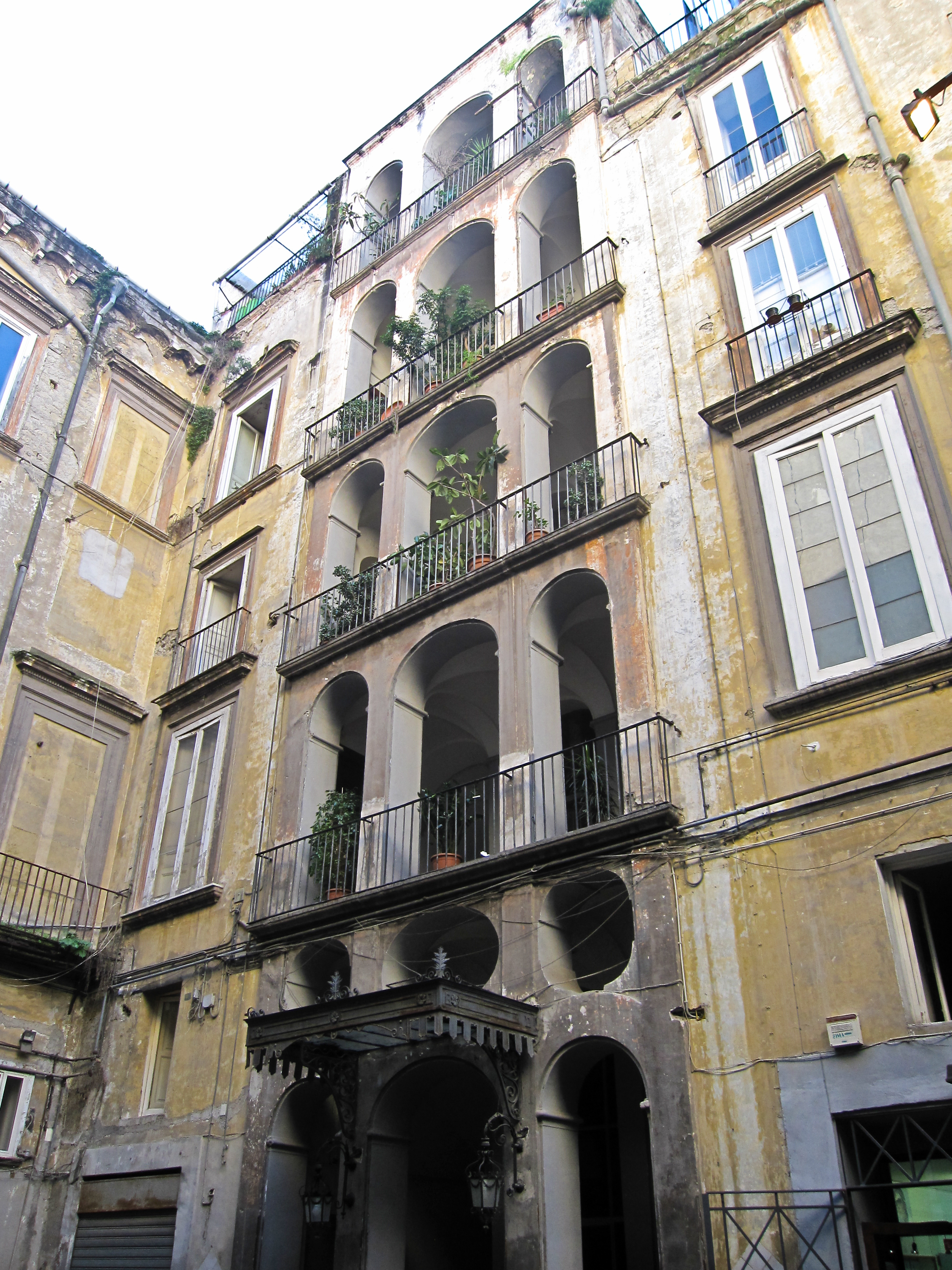
Interior

The Palazzo Venezia is a historical building in Naples, Italy, located at Via Benedetto Croce (a section of Spaccanapoli) 19.

It is next to three other important buildings of Naples: Filomarino Palace, Carafa della Spina Palace and Petrucci Palace. It is evidence of intense political relationship during the centuries between the Republic of Venice and the Kingdom of Naples and an ignored building that is hidden in the city centre.

== History ==
The palace was given in 1412 to the Venetian Republic by the King Ladislaus I for use as an embassy.

During the sixteenth century, the palace fell into complete ruin and Giuseppe Zono, by decree of the Venetian Senate, undertook to restore it in 1610. The same Zono made to affix a plaque in Latin on the restoration carried out. That was just one of the several plaques affixed inside the palace. One of them reminds the restoration made by Pietro Dolce in 1646; another one commemorates the complete renovation of the palace by Antonio Maria Vincenti, after the disastrous earthquake of June 5, 1688.

After the Napoleonic wars, with the treaty of Campoformio, the palace became property of the Habsburg monarchy, but a year later the lawyer Gaspare Capone bought it and restore it. In the 19th century was built a small neoclassic garden building (casina pompeiana) in the courtyard.

== The building ==
You enter the Venice Palace through a lowered arch with on top the family crest of Capone. On the left of it there is the eighteenth-century open stairway with three arches. The canopy is in iron and glass and back in the early nineteenth century.

A particular relevance has the garden, where you can find the little chapel called Mary's cave (grotta della Madonnina).

== See also ==
- Palazzo Venezia in Rome
- Palace of Venice, Istanbul
