= Lebon Patisserie & Café =

Defunct pastry shop in Istanbul, Turkey

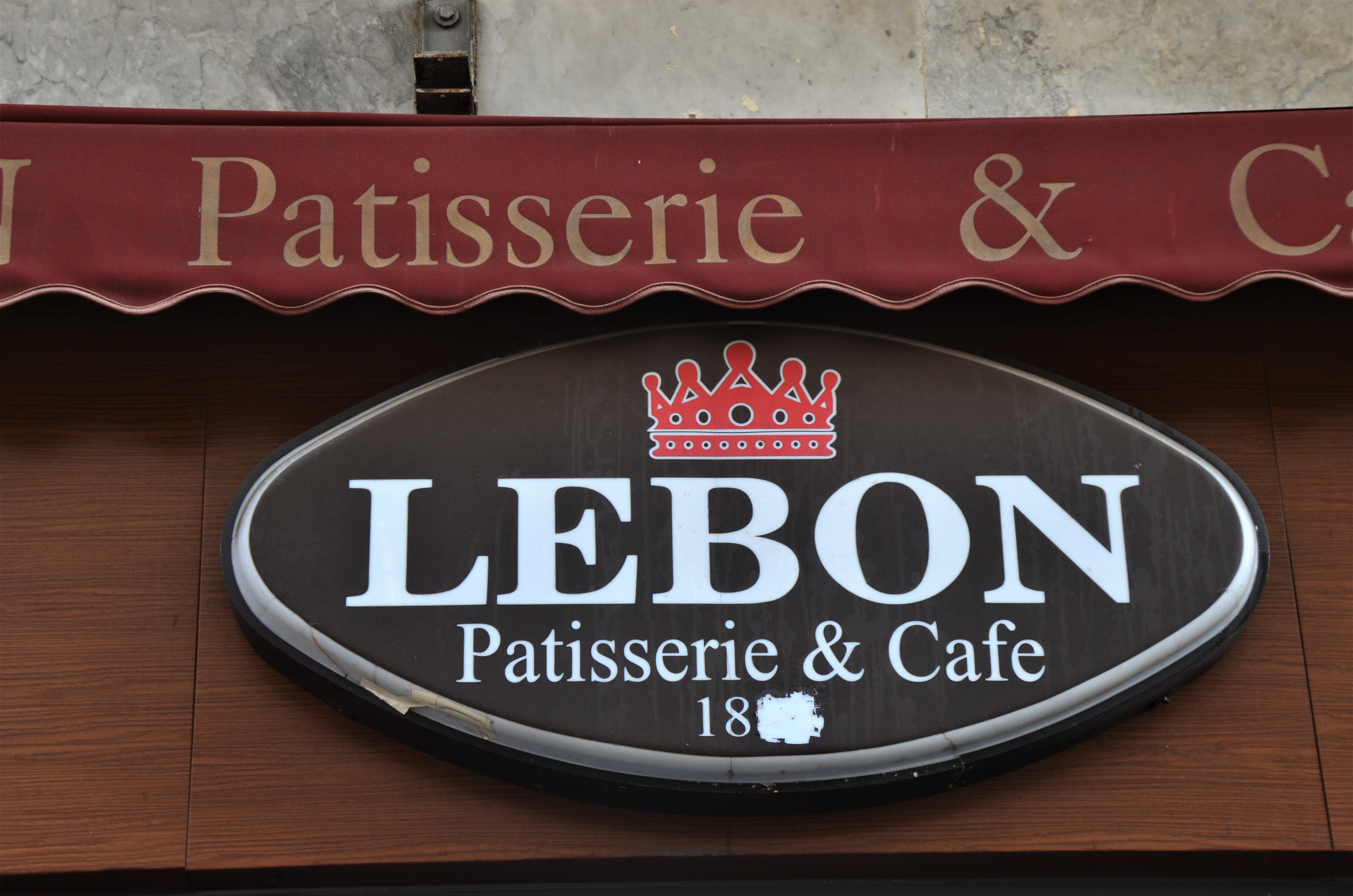

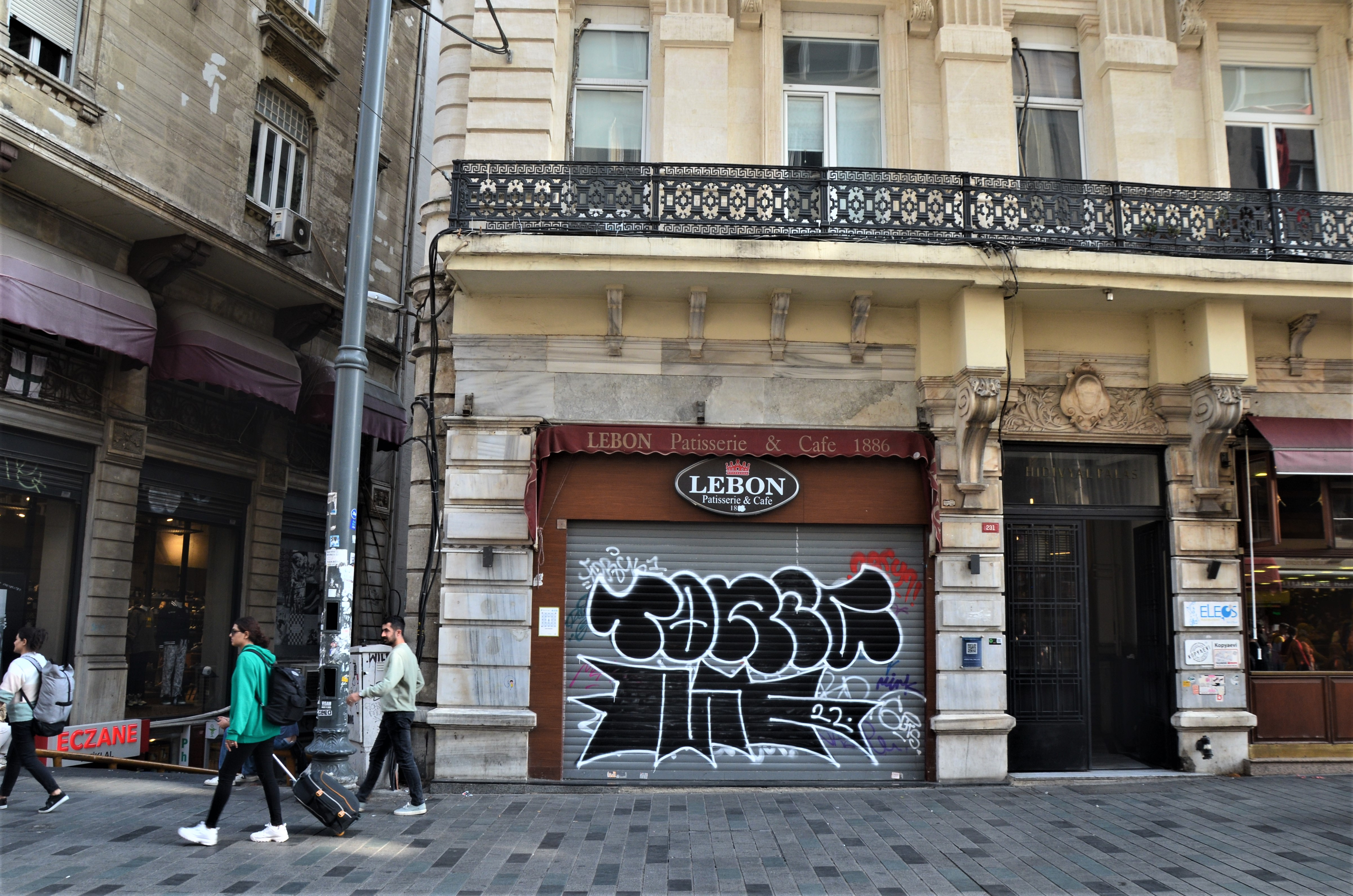
- Closed Lebon Patisserie & Café at İstiklal Avenue, Beyoğlu of Istanbul
- Interactive map of Lebon Patisserie & Café

Restaurant information
- Established: 1810; 216 years ago
- Closed: 1 January 1960; 66 years ago
- Previous owners: Charles Bourdon, Edouard Lebon, Kostas Litopoulos
- Food type: French dragées, cakes, profiterole
- Location: İstiklal Avenue 231/A, Istanbul, Turkey
- Coordinates: 41°01′46.0″N 28°58′31.4″E

The Lebon Patisserie & Café (Turkish: Lebon Pastanesi, Beyoğlu) was a historic pastry shop and café in the Beyoğlu district of Istanbul. Originally opened in 1810, it went out of business in the 1960s. Two entrepreneurs named, Şakir Ekinci and Abdurrahman Cengiz, revived the business and name in the 1990s. This second Lebon closed at the end of October 2022 because of an increase in rent.

== History ==
Lebon Patisserie & Café was established in 1886 by Edouard Lebon. Lebon was a French chef at the Embassy of France in Constantinople (present-day Istanbul), the capital of the Ottoman Empire. He left the embassy kitchen, and established the bakery, located at Grand rue de Péra (today İstiklal Avenue), on the corner of "Passage Oriental" in Pera (today Beyoğlu district of Istanbul). Pera was then a district populated mostly by Levantines and non-Muslims. The year of establishment was later corrected to 1810, when a customer brought a chocolate box printed "Lebon 1810" on it, suggesting the establish year is earlier than originally informed. Frenchman Charles Bourdon was recognized as the founder of the pastry shop.

After the death of Edouard Lebon in 1937, his Ottoman Greek chef aid Kostas Litopoulos took over the management of the shop. The bakery became famous for its interior design by the French-Ottoman architect Alexander Vallaury (1850–1921) as well as its French dragées, cakes and profiterole baked in a cake oven imported from Europe. It was also named "Şekerci Lebon" (Confectionery Lebon) or "Maison Lebon".

In the 1920s, tiled wall panels decorated in Art Nouveau style with a four seasons theme were ordered from France for the purpose of changing the interior design. The panel representing winter was destroyed, while the summer panel was later removed and replaced by a mirror. The pastry shop featured Limoges porcelain by Haviland & Co., Christofle tableware and Décugis crystals.

Being well known for its quality and luxury, this place was dubbed "Chez Lebon, tout est bon" ("Everything is good at Lebon"). Some wealthy European travelers, who came to Istanbul by Orient Express train, and prominent local people like poets Ahmet Haşim (1884?–1933), Tevfik Fikret (1867–1915), Abdülhak Hâmid (1852–1937), Yahya Kemal (1884–1958), writers Namık Kemal (1840–1888), Ziya Pasha (1829–1880), İbrahim Şinasi (1826–1871) and French novelist Pierre Loti (1850–1923) were among the visitors of the Lebon Patisserie & Café.

In 1940, Lebon Patisserie moved across the street. In the previous location, Avedis Ohanyan Çakır opened the "Markiz Patisserie", named after the Marquise de Sévigné chocolate shop in Paris. The tiled wall panels of Lebon remained in the Markiz Patisserie, which he ran from 1985 onwards.

Lebon Patisserie was the first pâtisserie in the Ottoman era and the early years of the Turkish Republic.

== Closure ==
Even there are a lot of details around Lebon Patisserie, there is no record about it between the 1950s and 1980s because of ambiguous information. . Two entrepreneurs named Şakir Ekinci and Abdurrahman Cengiz opened their own Lebon Patisserie in 1985 close to the original location, but the design and recipes differed from the original. Starting with the year 2021, the owners of the revived Lebon were considered closure because they were unable to pay rent. Finally, it went out of business in October 2022.
