= Naum Theatre =

Former theatre and opera house in Istanbul, Turkey

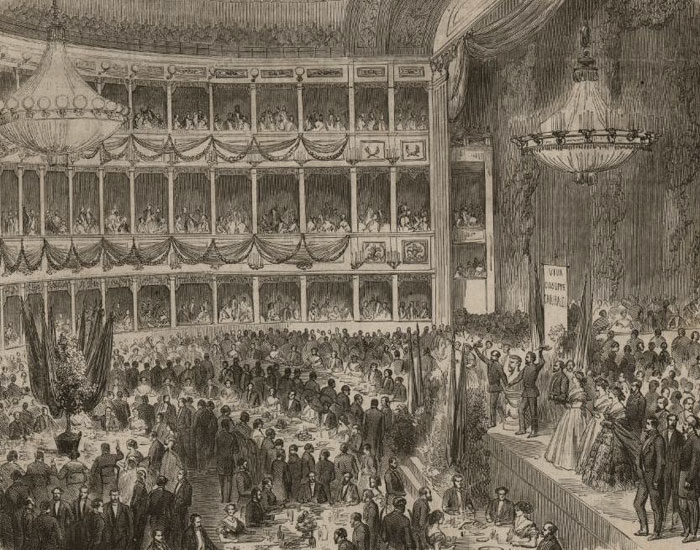
A reception held at the Naum Theatre in honour of Giuseppe Garibaldi, who had lived and worked (as a teacher) in the Pera (Beyoğlu) district of Constantinople (Istanbul) between 1828 and 1831. The Naum Theatre seen in this illustration served as the chief opera house of Constantinople, until it was destroyed by a fire 1870.

The Naum Theatre, named after its owners Michel Naum and Joseph Naum of Levantine Catholic background, was a theatre and opera house on İstiklal Avenue in the Beyoğlu (formerly Pera) district of Istanbul, Turkey. It was opened in 1844 and remained active until the building was severely damaged by the Fire of Pera in 1870. The ruined theatre building was purchased by Ottoman Greek banker Hristaki Zoğrafos Efendi, who built the present-day Çiçek Pasajı on its land plot in 1876.

== History ==
The Naum Theatre was originally built in 1839 as the Bosco Theatre by Italian illusionist Bartolomeo Bosco, on a plot of land on İstiklal Avenue owned by the Naum family,. The original building was wooden and in Ottoman style. After Bosco left the city, ownership of the building passed to Michel and Joseph Naum, who, upon completing the renovation works, reopened it as the Théatre de Péra in 1844. The first play to be performed here was the opera Norma by Vincenzo Bellini.

After the original wooden building suffered fire damage in 1846, a new theatre was constructed. It opened on 4 November 1848 with Macbeth by Giuseppe Verdi. In 1849 it was renamed the Théatre Italien Naum. The theatre was frequently visited by Sultans Abdülaziz and Abdülhamid II, and hosted Giuseppe Verdi's opera Il Trovatore before the opera houses of Paris. The majority of the operas that were performed at the Naum Theatre were composed by Vincenzo Bellini, Gaetano Donizetti and Gioachino Rossini. In a letter to his mother, Gustave Flaubert wrote that he watched an opera by Donizetti at the Naum Theatre the day after his arrival in Istanbul (then Constantinople).

Michel and Joseph Naum held the sole right to stage many European plays and operas in Istanbul, and brought many foreign troupes to the city. They also printed the first Ottoman Turkish translations of many operas as booklets. Apart from the usual evening performances, they also organised daytime versions for audiences coming from the Asian side of the Bosphorus.

=== Çiçek Pasajı ===
After the Fire of Pera on 5 June 1870, the ruined theatre was purchased by Ottoman Greek banker Hristaki Zoğrafos Efendi, and Ottoman Greek architect Kleanthis Zannos designed the current Çiçek Pasajı building, which was constructed in 1876 on the same site.

== See also ==
- Atatürk Cultural Center – main concert hall on European side of Istanbul
- Süreyya Opera House – opera house on Asian side of Istanbul
- Zorlu Center PSM – largest performing arts theatre and concert hall in Istanbul
