= Palace of Venice, Istanbul =

Historic building in Istanbul

Coordinates: 41.0297°N 28.9772°E

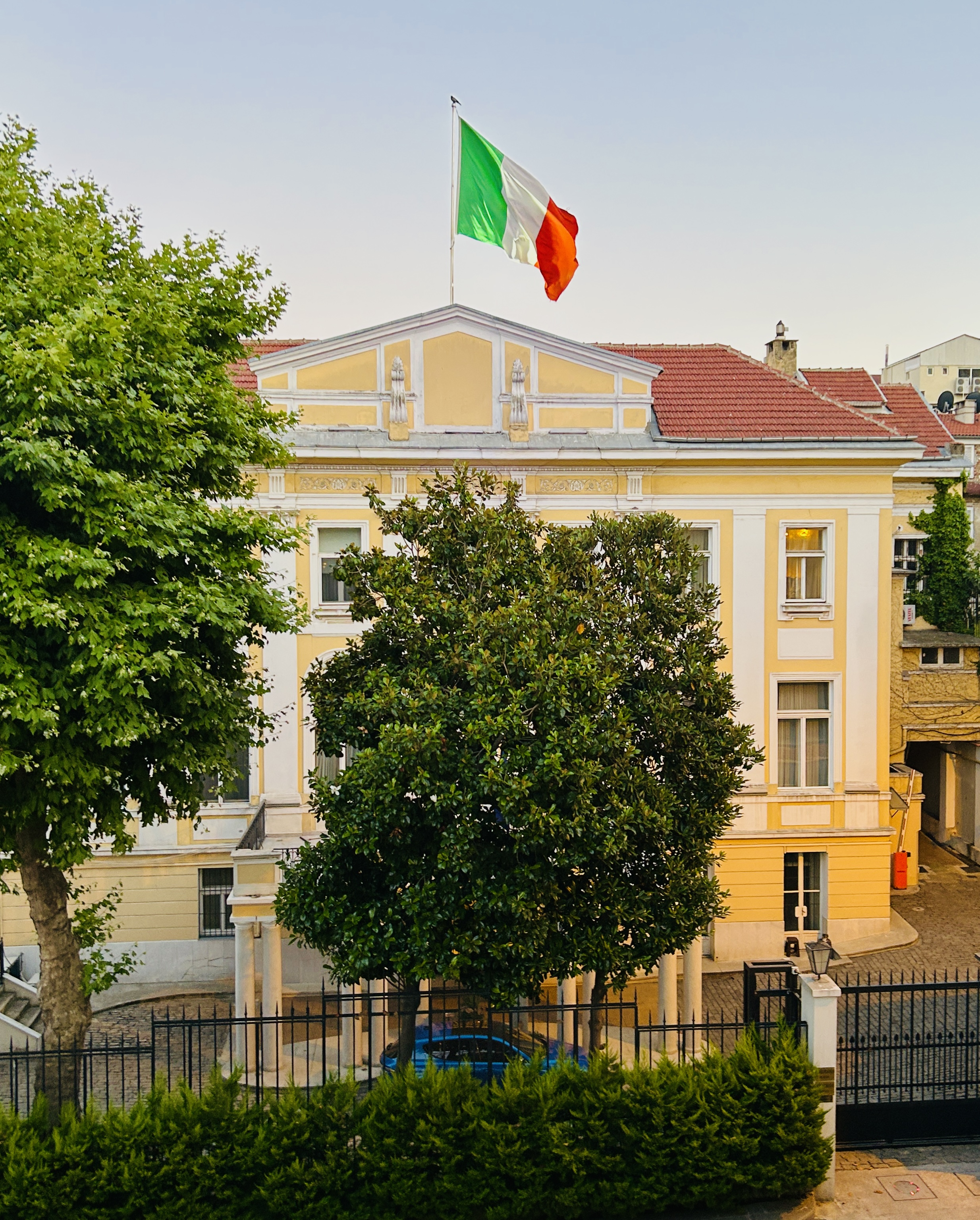
Palace of Venice, photographed in 2025

The Palace of Venice (Italian: Palazzo di Venezia, Turkish: Venedik Sarayı) is a historic property in the Beyoğlu (formerly Pera) neighborhood of Istanbul, Turkey. From the early 16th century to 1923 it has been the seat of the embassies in the Ottoman Empire of, successively, the Republic of Venice, the French Empire, the Austrian Empire, and the Kingdom of Italy. Following the abolition of the Sultanate in 1922 and the subsequent relocation of the Italian embassy to the new Turkish capital Ankara in 1923, the Palace of Venice has served as the Italian Consulate-General in Istanbul, as well as a residence for the ambassador when in town.

The building was altered repeatedly following episodes of fire and disrepair, and the current structure mostly results from reconstruction in the 1910s. The large surrounding property also hosts the Italian school or Liceo Italiano di Istanbul, originally established in the 1880s by Austria-Hungary.

== Name ==
The property has been referred continuously as Palace of Venice, or Palais de Venise as French was long widely used in the city's international community. It kept that name even after the demise of the Venetian Republic in 1797, and its entrance still harbored a representation of the Lion of Saint Mark throughout its use by the Habsburg monarchy.

== History ==
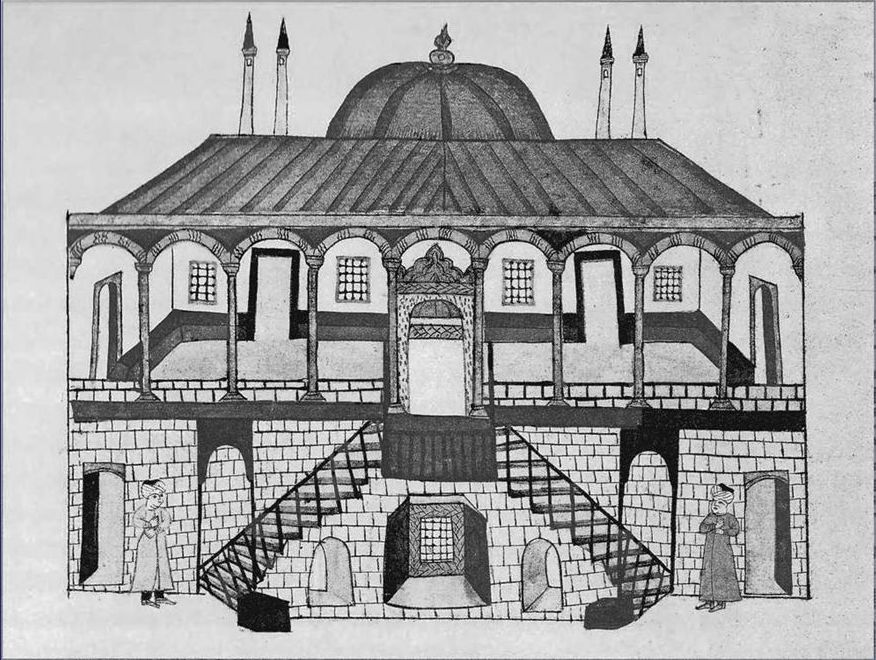
The Palace of Venice around 1660

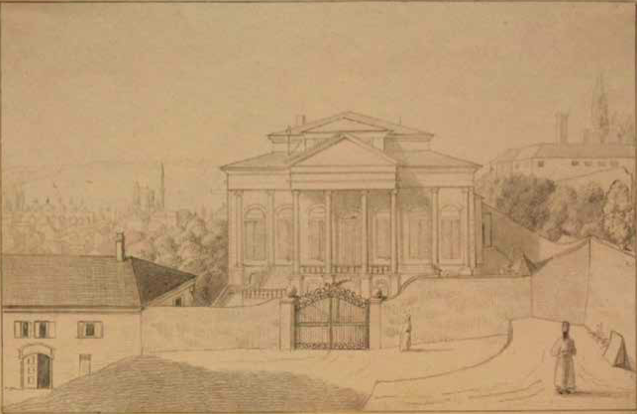
The Palace of Venice in 1840, drawing by Albrecht Krafft

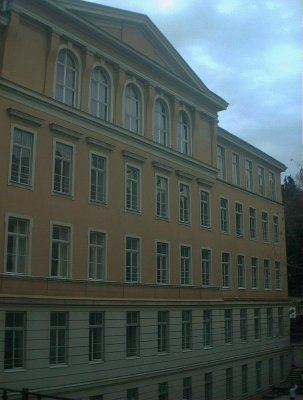
School building erected in 1888 next to the Palace of Venice, now Liceo Italiano

Before the Fall of Constantinople in 1453, the Venitian community, which had been effectively ruling the city via its podestà in the 13th century, was mostly located in the neighborhood presently known as Eminönü. On 18 April 1454, the Venetians secured continuous residence in the conquered city by concluding a peace agreement or ahidnâme with Mehmed II, but the sultan did not allow their leader, the bailo of Constantinople, to remain in the premises they had used in Byzantine times. Instead, the bailo initially rented a house owned by merchants from Ancona near the present-day New Mosque, next to a church dedicated to Saint Stephen.

Over the following decades, the successive bailos increasingly opted to reside on the other side of the Golden Horn in Pera, and did so permanently after they were expelled from their lodgings near Saint Stephen's church during the war of 1499–1503. In the early 16th century, they settled on the property where the Palace of Venice still stands, known at the time as Vigne di Pera (lit. 'Pera vineyards') and belonging to the Salvago family. From that early period, a chapel was also located on the property, which was accessible from the main street of Pera (now İstiklal Avenue) via a steep alley. From 1551 onwards, a language school for Oriental languages also operated at the bailo's residence for the training of well-born young Venetians as dragomans, which served as a model for several other states.

In 1676, the Levantine Testa family acquired the property from the Salvagos. The Republic of Venice was long reluctant to buy their compound out of fear of expropriation, but eventually purchased it from the Testas in 1746. Bailo Paolo Renier commissioned extensive renovations in 1772, then after a fire in January 1774 his successor Andrea Memmo undertook comprehensive reconstruction which was completed in 1782. At the time, the rebuilt Palace of Venice was among the most opulent properties in Constantinople.

Following the fall of the Republic of Venice and the Treaty of Campo Formio in 1797, the Habsburg monarchy took possession of the Palazzo Venezia in Rome but the ownership of the Palace of Venice in Constantinople was contested between the French ambassador and the Austrian imperial envoy to the Ottoman Empire, who was referred to as the internuncio. Since 1781, the latter had resided in the local convent of the Trinitarians, which following the Austrian suppression of that order in 1783 had been known as the Palais d'Allemagne. The dispute was resolved by the suspension of French-Ottoman diplomatic relations in September 1798 following the French invasion of Egypt. Shortly afterwards on 13 March 1799, the Palais d'Allemagne was destroyed by fire and the internuncio took residence in the Palace of Venice. Under the terms of the Peace of Pressburg (1805), however, Venice came under French rule and the French Ambassador subsequently took over the palace in 1806 for use as his own residence, as the nearby Palais de France had been expropriated in 1798 and was by then used by the British ambassador. Internuncio Ignaz von Stürmer thus relocated to the house of his chancellor Bartolomeo di Testa, a scion of the same family that had previously owned the Palace of Venice. That building in turn was destroyed by fire on 18 June 1811, and Stürmer subsequently rented the Palais de Hollande, the former property of the Dutch Republic that had come under French ownership after Napoleon annexed the Kingdom of Holland in 1810. Austrian efforts to purchase the Palais de Hollande from France were cut short by the Battle of Leipzig in October 1813. In 1815, the Congress of Vienna eventually granted the Palais de Hollande to the newly formed Kingdom of the Netherlands, while the Austrian Empire recovered the Palace of Venice for use by its internuncio.

In 1853, Internuncio Karl Ludwig von Bruck commissioned a redesign of the palace from the Fossati brothers, and additional works were directed by architect Domenico Pulgher in 1863. In 1866, the Third Italian War of Independence led to Venice's incorporation into the new Kingdom of Italy, but the diplomatic arrangements that followed the Armistice of Cormons allowed Austria to retain property of the Palace of Venice in Constantinople as well as that in Rome. The next year, as a consequence of the Austro-Hungarian Compromise, the envoy of the newly formed Austria-Hungary formally took the title of ambassador rather than internuncio.

In 1888, the embassy commissioned a large school building immediately to the east of the Palace of Venice, which later became the Liceo Italiano di Istanbul. In 1914, Ambassador Johann von Pallavicini undertook a program of careful rebuilding that preserved some elements of the palace, directed by architect Ludwig Richter. The old property was largely demolished in June 1914, but the reconstruction was delayed by the outbreak of World War I. The new structure was standing by February 1916, but its interior arrangements were still unfinished when Emperor Charles I and Empress Zita visited more than two years later, even though the imperial couple hosted a lunch in the building on 21 May 1918. Meanwhile, the ambassador resided at his summer residence in Yeniköy on the Bosporus.

Following the Armistice of Mudros and fast-unfolding dissolution of Austria-Hungary, Pallavicini was deported to Bulgaria on 30 November 1918, and on the next day Italian envoy Carlo Sforza claimed the Palace of Venice as "historical Italian property", after which he got the reconstruction work completed. On 27 March 1919, the building became the seat of the Italian High Commissioner and then, from 1925, the seat of the Italian ambassador to the Republic of Turkey; Italy then opened a provisional office in Ankara in 1928, until a new embassy building was constructed there between 1938 and 1940. Italy subsequently kept the Palace of Venice for use by its Consulate-General in Istanbul.

== Related properties ==
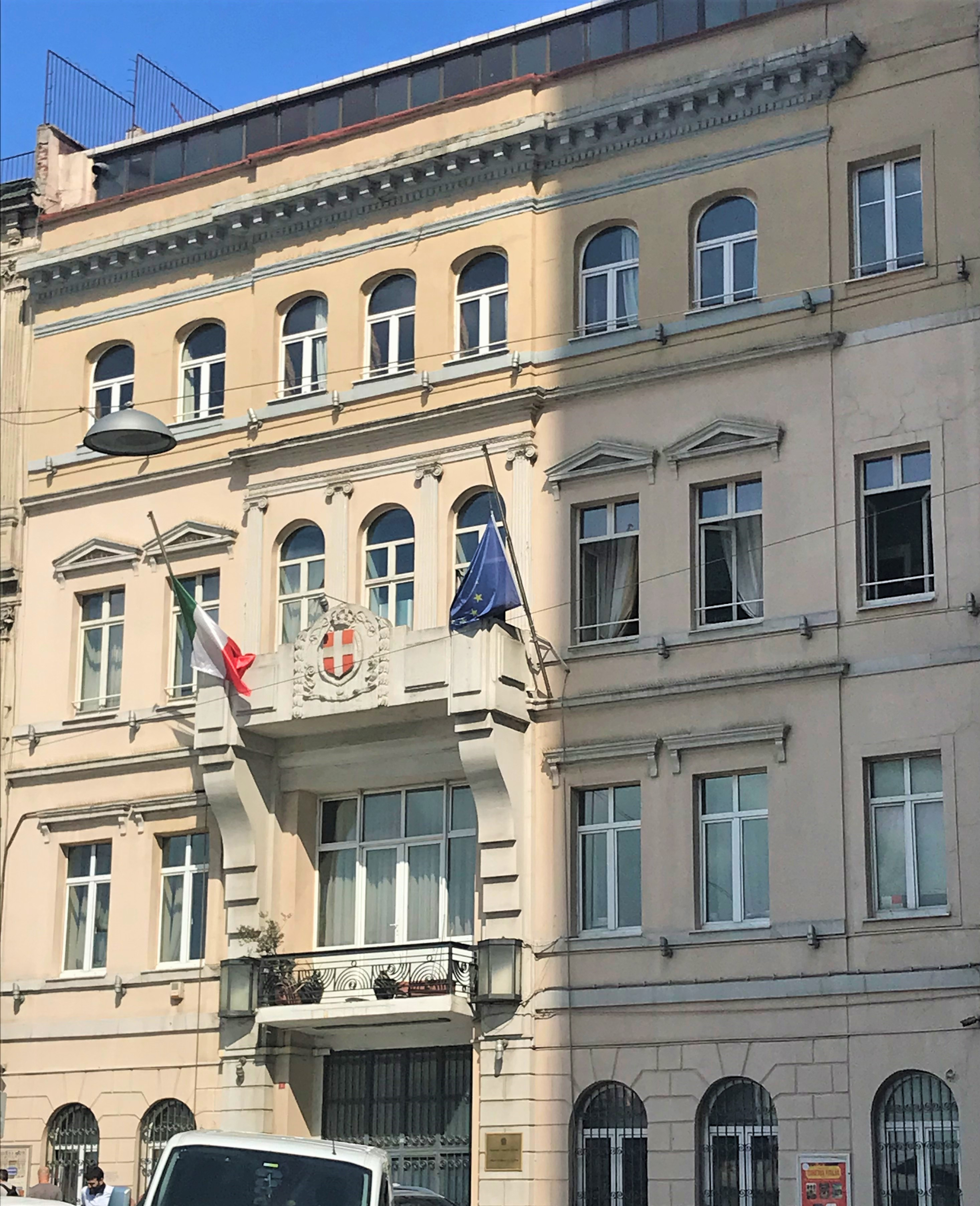
Istituto Italiano di Cultura

The Istituto Italiano di Cultura has been located since 1951 about 200 meters northwest, Meşrutiyet Caddesi 75, in a building that had previously housed the diplomatic mission of the Kingdom of Sardinia then of the Kingdom of Italy until World War I.

In 1911-1912, Italy began construction of a new embassy building in the Nişantaşı district of Istanbul, on a design by architect Giulio Mongeri. That structure remained unfinished due to the war and subsequent Italian takeover of the Palace of Venice. Since 1957, it has housed the Maçka Vocational and Technical Anatolian High School, a technical high school.

The Italian state also owns the Villa Tarabya in Tarabya on the Bosporus, a yalı rebuilt in 1906 on a design by architect Raimondo D'Aronco.

== See also ==
- Eastern question
- List of ambassadors of Italy to the Ottoman Empire
- List of diplomatic missions of Italy
- Palazzo Venezia, Naples
