= Çiçek Pasajı =

Coordinates: 41°2′2.2″N 28°58′40.5″E

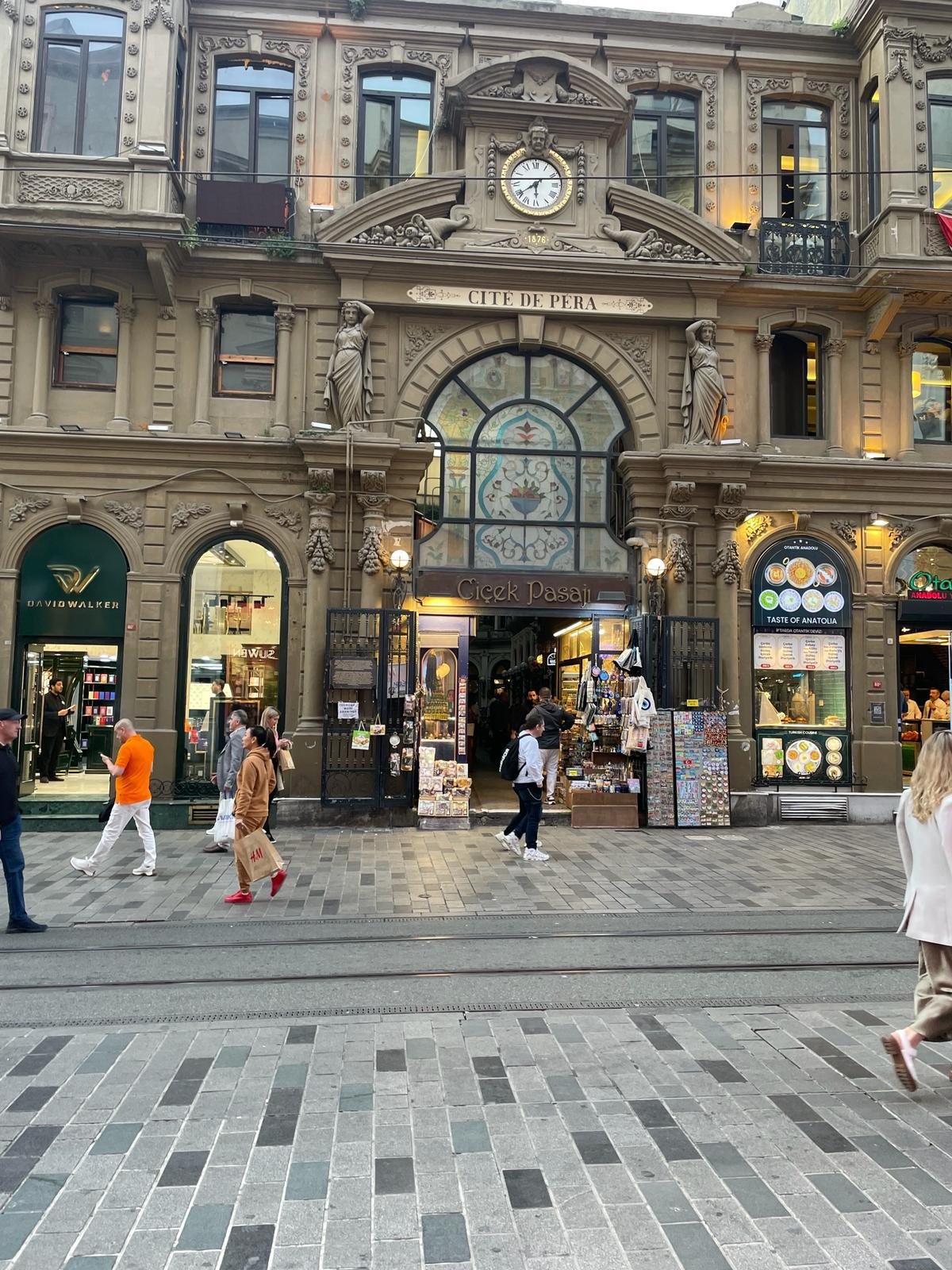
- The main entrance of Çiçek Pasajı (Cité de Péra) on İstiklal Avenue
- Interactive map of the Çiçek Pasajı area

General information
- Type: Arcade
- Location: Hüseyinağa Mah, Istiklal Street, Saitpasa Passage No:176, 34435 Beyoglu/Istanbul
- Completed: 1876
- Renovated: December 2005

Technical details
- Material: Reinforced concrete
- Floor count: 3

Design and construction
- Architect: Kleanthis Zannos

Website
- tarihicicekpasaji.com

Çiçek Pasajı (Turkish: Flower Passage), originally called the Cité de Péra, is a famous historic passage (galleria or arcade) on İstiklal Avenue in the Beyoğlu district of Istanbul, Turkey. A covered arcade with rows of historic cafes, winehouses and restaurants, it connects İstiklal Avenue with Sahne Street and has a side entrance opening onto the Balık Pazarı (Fish Market).

== History ==
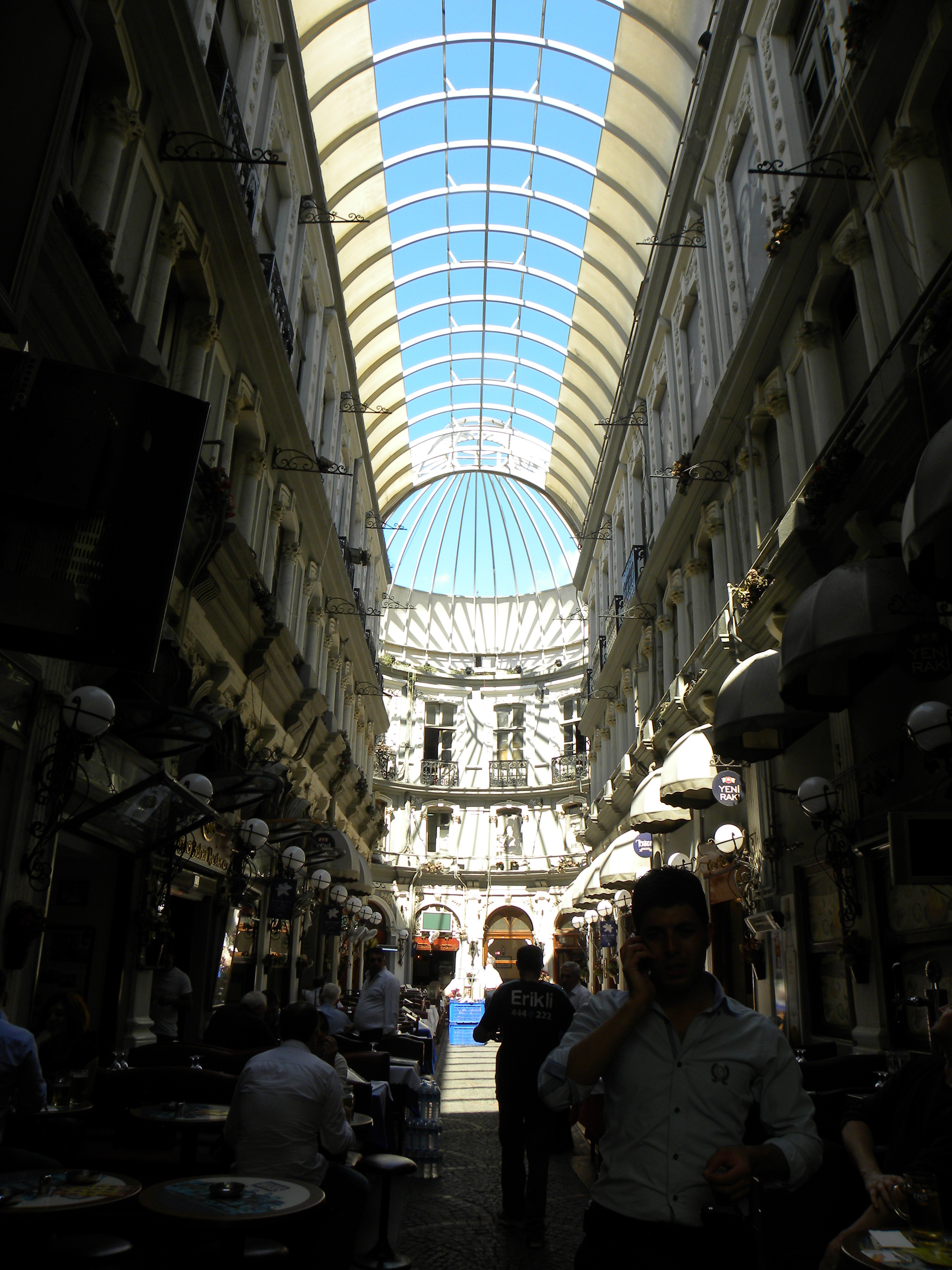
A view of the glass roof above the atrium and the glass cupola in the background

The site of Çiçek Pasajı was originally occupied by the Naum Theatre, which was severely damaged by the Fire of Pera in 1870. The theatre was frequently visited by Sultans Abdülaziz and Abdülhamid II, and hosted Giuseppe Verdi's opera Il Trovatore before the opera houses of Paris.

After the fire of 1870, the theatre was purchased by Ottoman Greek banker Hristaki Zoğrafos Efendi, and in 1876 architect Kleanthis Zannos designed the current building, which was called Cité de Péra or Hristaki Pasajı (Hristaki Passage) in its early years. Yorgo'nun Meyhanesi (Yorgo's Winehouse) was the first winehouse to be opened in the passage.

In 1908, Grand Vizier Mehmed Said Pasha purchased the building, and it became known as the Sait Paşa Pasajı (Said Pasha Passage).

Following the Russian Revolution of 1917, a number of impoverished noble Russian women, including a baroness, opened flower shops here. By the 1940s the building was mostly occupied by flower shops, hence the present Turkish name Çiçek Pasajı (Flower Passage).

After the restoration of the building in 1988, it was reopened as a galleria of pubs and restaurants.

The most recent restorations took place in 2005 and 2022, when the building was repainted, and the glass roof and glass cupola were cleansed.

== See also ==
- Naum Theatre
