= İstiklal Avenue =

Avenue in Beyoğlu, Istanbul

- Grand Avenue of Péra
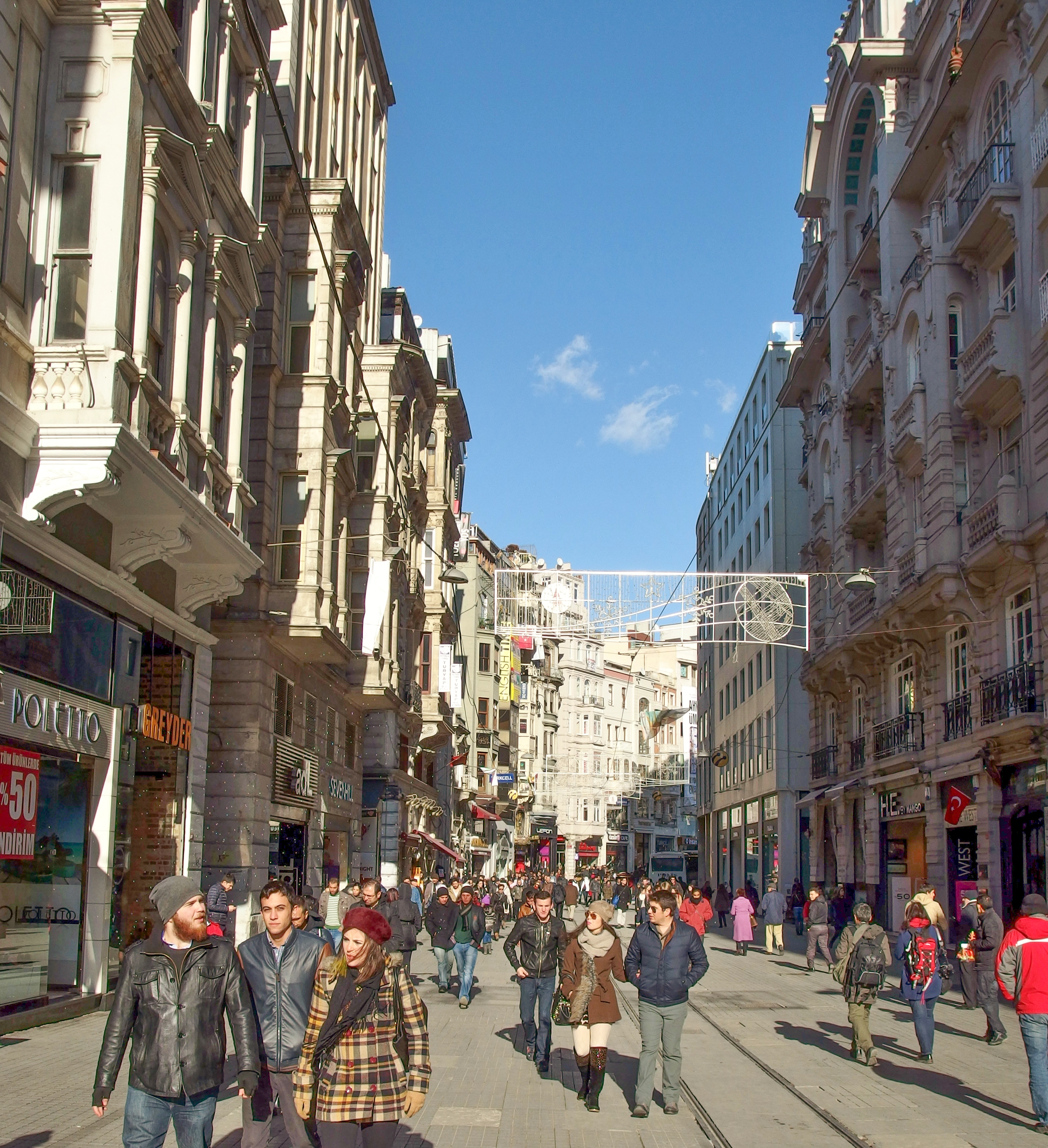
- İstiklal Avenue in the Beyoğlu district of Istanbul

- Location within Turkey
- Native name: İstiklal Caddesi
- Type: Street
- Location: Beyoğlu, Istanbul Province, Turkey
- Coordinates: 41°02′03.0″N 28°58′44.0″E

İstiklal Avenue (Turkish: İstiklal Caddesi, lit. 'Independence Avenue') is a 1.4 kilometre (0.87 mi) pedestrian street in the historic Beyoğlu (Pera) district in Istanbul, Turkey. It is one of the most famous avenues in the city. It acquired its modern name after the declaration of the Republic on 29 October 1923, İstiklal (Independence) commemorating Turkey's triumph in its War of Independence.

The street starts at the northern end of Galata (the medieval Genoese quarter) at Tünel Square and runs as far as Taksim Square. It was historically known as the Grand Avenue of Pera (Ottoman Turkish: جادهٔ كبیر, romanized: Cadde-i Kebir; Greek: Μεγάλη Οδός του Πέραν, romanized: Megali Odos tou Peran). İstiklal Avenue is flanked by late Ottoman era buildings (mostly from the 19th and early 20th centuries) in a variety of styles including Neo-Classical, Neo-Gothic, Renaissance Revival, Beaux-Arts, Art Nouveau and First Turkish National Architecture. There are also a few Art Deco style buildings from the early years of the Turkish Republic, and a number of more recent examples of modern architecture. Many would once have been apartment blocks but most are now occupied by boutiques, music stores, art galleries, cinemas, theatres, libraries, cafés, pubs, nightclubs with live music, hotels, historical patisseries, chocolateries, restaurants and a steadily growing number of international chain stores, as well as a branch of Madame Tussauds.

Galatasaray Square marks the middle of the avenue and is home to the oldest secondary school in Turkey: the Galatasaray High School (Galatasaray Lisesi), originally known as the Galata Sarayı Enderun-u Hümayunu (Galata Palace Imperial School). A monument, erected in 1973, commemorates the 50th anniversary of the founding of the Turkish Republic.

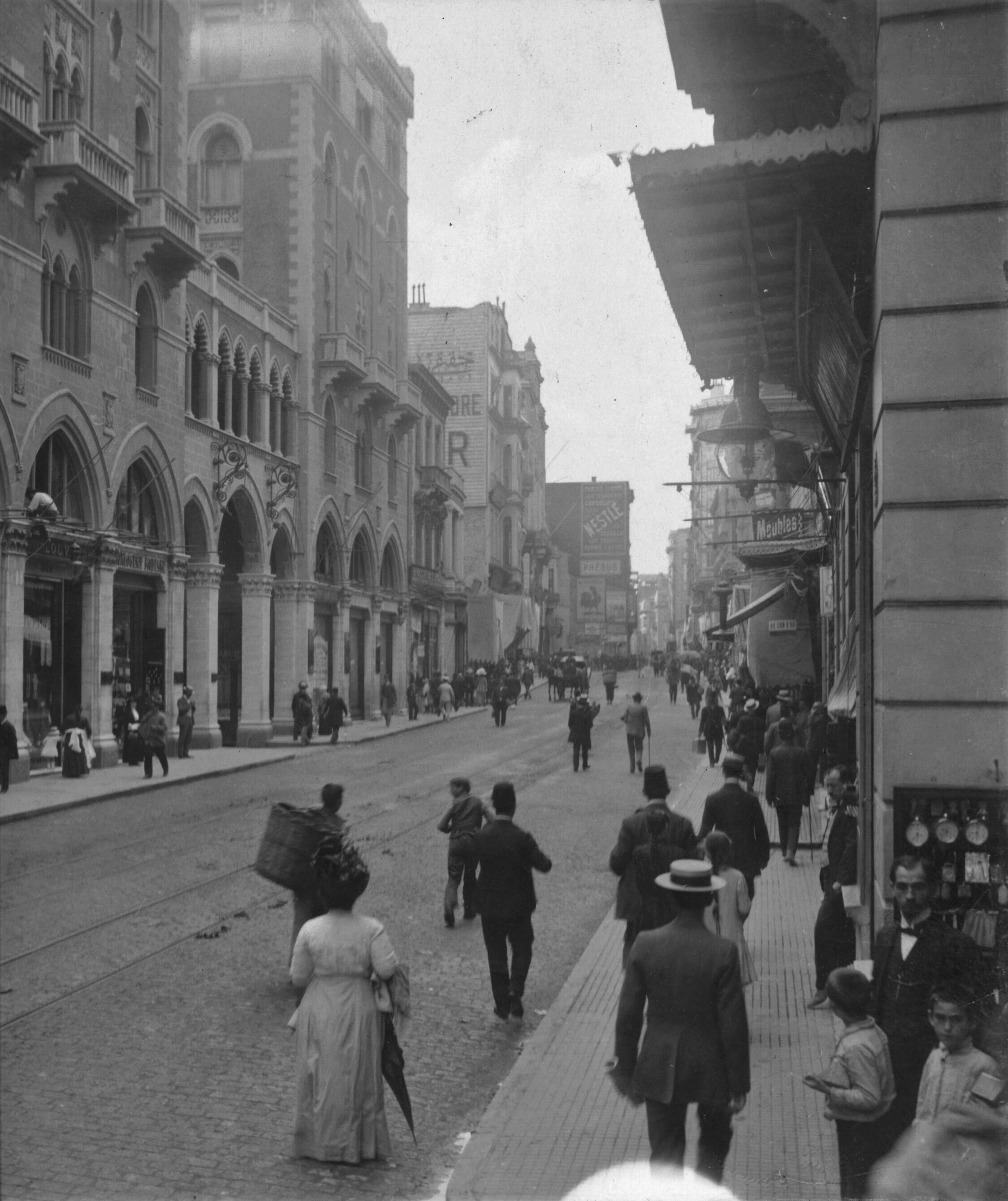
Cadde-i Kebir (Grande Rue de Péra) in 1912. It was renamed as İstiklal Caddesi in 1923.

The avenue forms a spine with narrow side streets running off it like a ribcage. Many historical and politically significant buildings can be found on or immediately adjacent to Istiklal Avenue. They include the Çiçek Pasajı (Flower Passage) which is full of lively restaurants and taverns; the Balık Pazarı (The Fish Market) with the Armenian Üç Horan church to one side; the Hüseyin Ağa Mosque; the Roman Catholic churches of Santa Maria Draperis and S. Antonio di Padova; the Greek Orthodox church of Hagia Triada; several academic institutions established by Austria, France, Germany and Italy in the 19th century; and the consulates (embassies until 1923 when these moved to the new capital of Ankara) of France, Greece, the Netherlands, Russia, Spain and Sweden (the consulate of the United Kingdom is just off Istiklal Avenue on Meşrutiyet Street).

At the southern end of the avenue, it is possible to board the Tünel (Tunnel), which was inaugurated on January 17, 1875, making it the second-oldest underground urban railway in the world after the London Underground which opened on January 10, 1863. Nostalgic trams run along İstiklal Avenue, between Taksim Square and Tünel Square.

== History ==
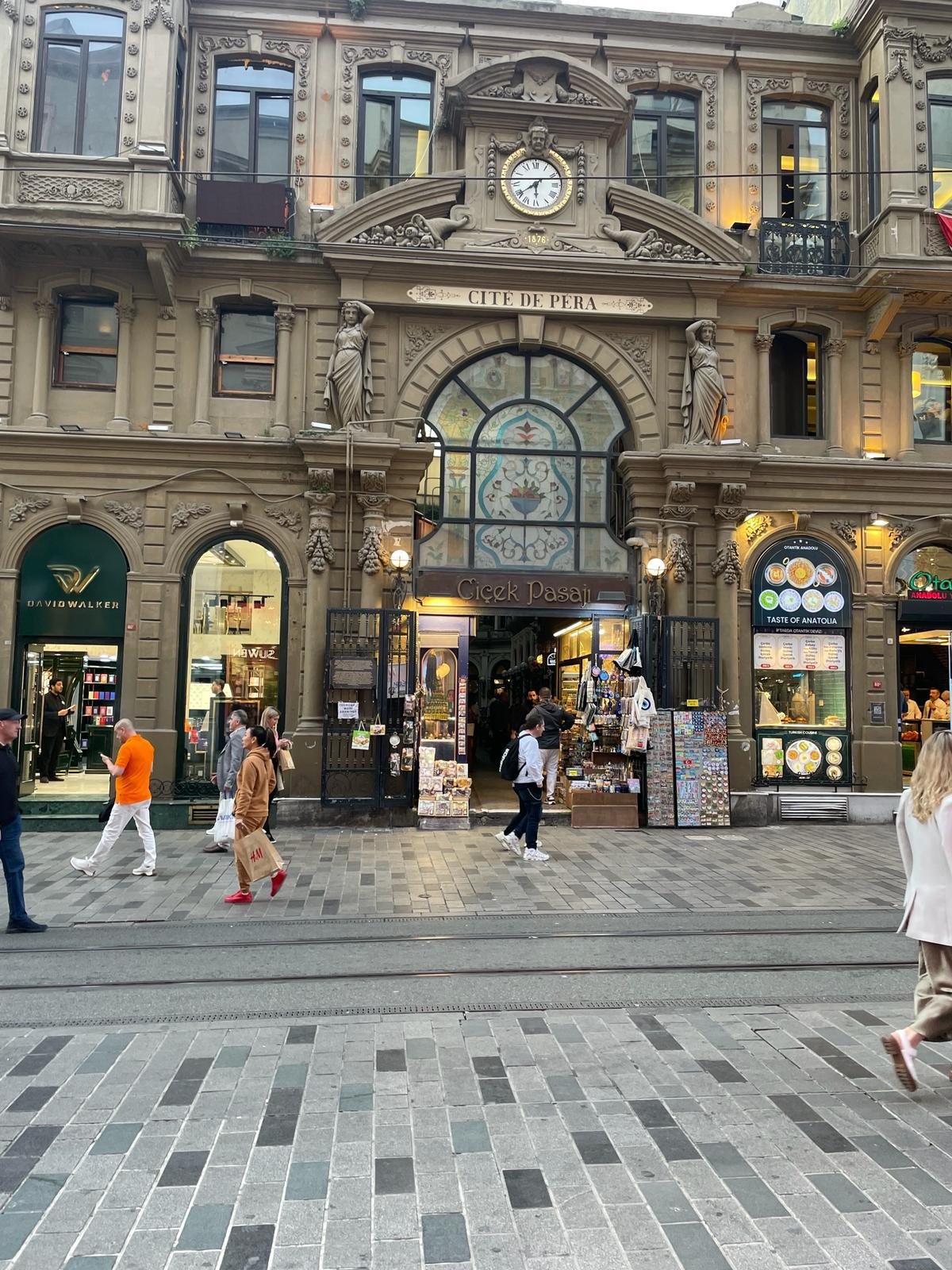
Çiçek Pasajı (Flower Passage), also known by its French name Cité de Péra, is one of the many historic buildings that adorn the avenue.

During the Ottoman period, the avenue was called Cadde-i Kebir (Grand Avenue) in Ottoman Turkish, or the Grande Rue de Péra (Grand Avenue of Pera) in French. It was a popular area among the intelligentsia, where Turks, Greeks, Armenians, Jews and the local Italian and French Levantines came together with European diplomats, merchants and travelers at numerous historic venues along the street.

On 6–7 September 1955, the anti-Greek Istanbul pogrom resulted in many shops along the avenue being pillaged; its pavements were covered with broken glass, scattered clothing, smashed white goods, burned automobiles and other items that had belonged to the Greek owners of the wrecked shops.

Between the 1950s and 1970s the side streets around the Emek Passage (Emek Pasajı) were home to Yeşilcam, Turkey's home-grown equivalent of Hollywood, a fact commemorated in the street name Yeşilcam Sokağı.

The avenue briefly fell from grace in the 1970s and early 1980s, when the old Istanbulite inhabitants started moving elsewhere, and the side streets (then infamous for bars and night clubs with live music and shows, called pavyon in Turkish) were repopulated by low-income migrants from rural Anatolia.

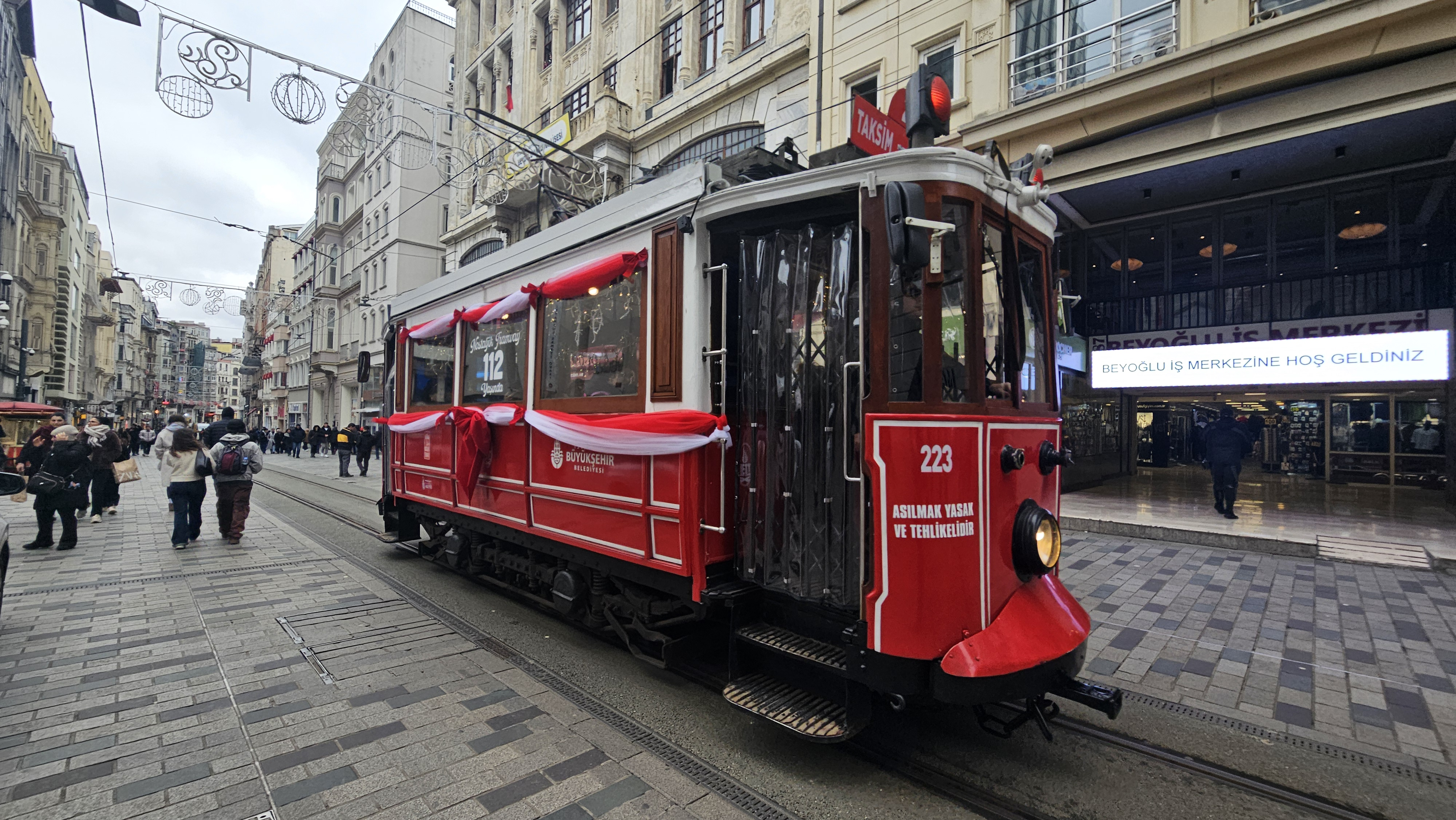
A nostalgic tram on İstiklal Avenue

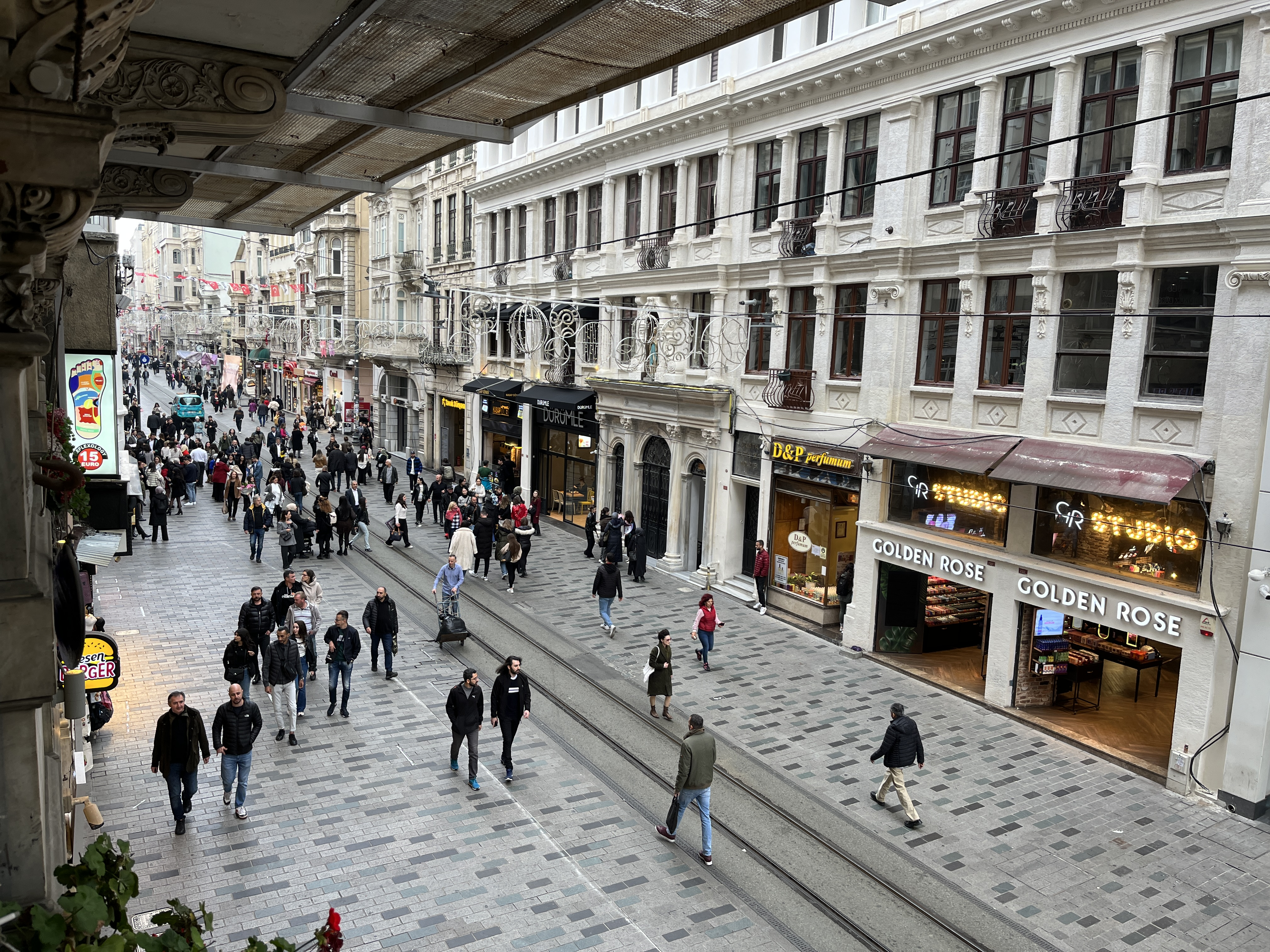
A view of İstiklal Avenue in 2023, with the current pavement pattern

During the late 1980s and early 1990s, a revival took place, spearheaded and executed by the Istanbul Metropolitan Municipality and Beyoğlu Municipality. Historic buildings were restored, the street was pedestrianised, and the nostalgic trams were reinstated in 1990, bringing back much of the avenue's old charm and popularity.

İstiklal Avenue once again became the center for fine arts and leisure in Istanbul and real estate prices skyrocketed. Numerous new art galleries, bookstores, cafés, pubs, restaurants, shops and hotels were opened in and around the street, and venues around it became the host to many international art festivals, such as the annual Istanbul Film Festival.

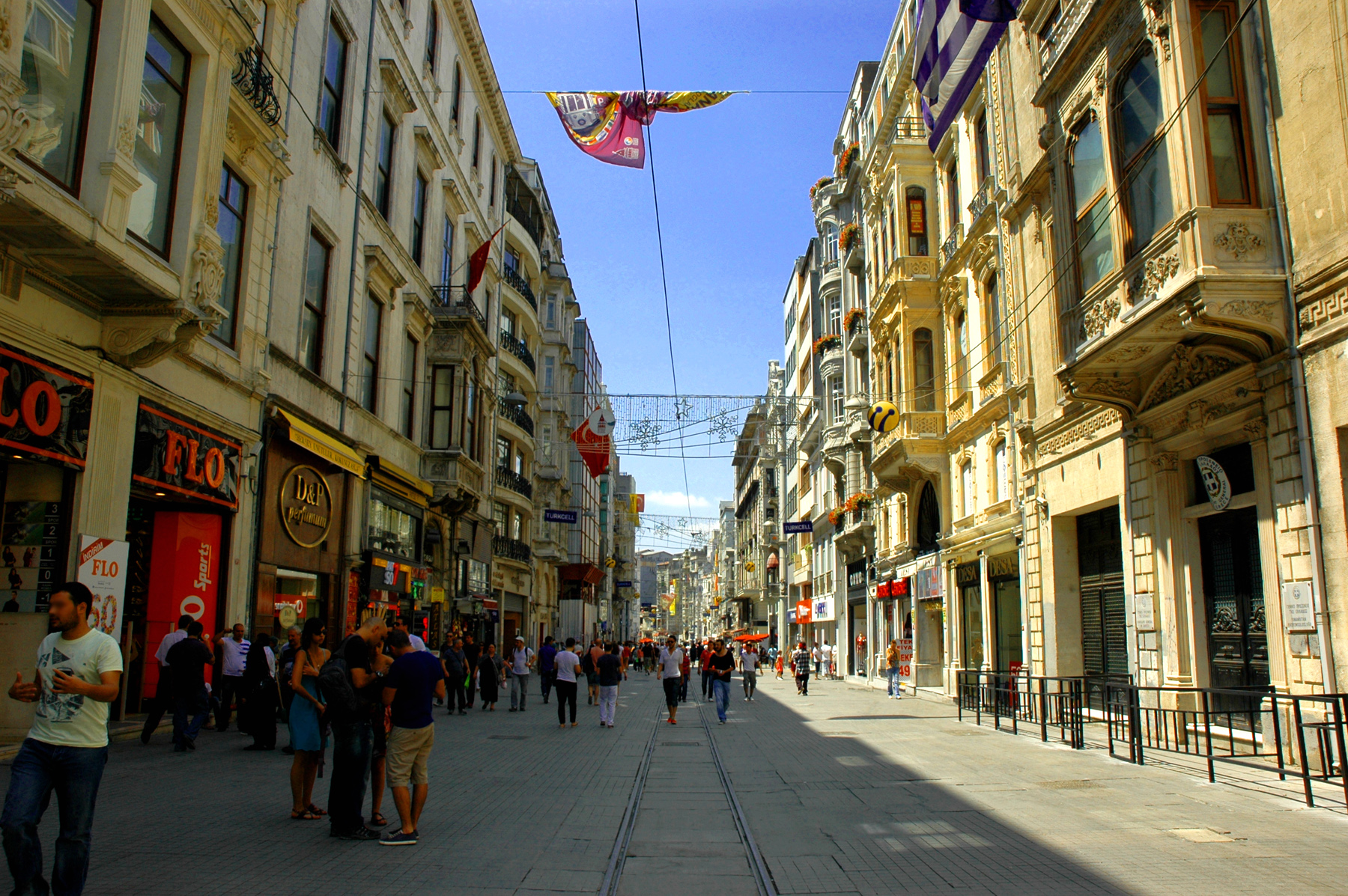
A view of İstiklal Avenue in 2013

Until the mid-2010s, İstiklal Avenue was also a popular venue for all sorts of parades, marches and gatherings, such as the Istanbul Pride and International Women's Day. However, after the Gezi Park protests of 2013, all such gatherings have been effectively banned, citing security reasons.

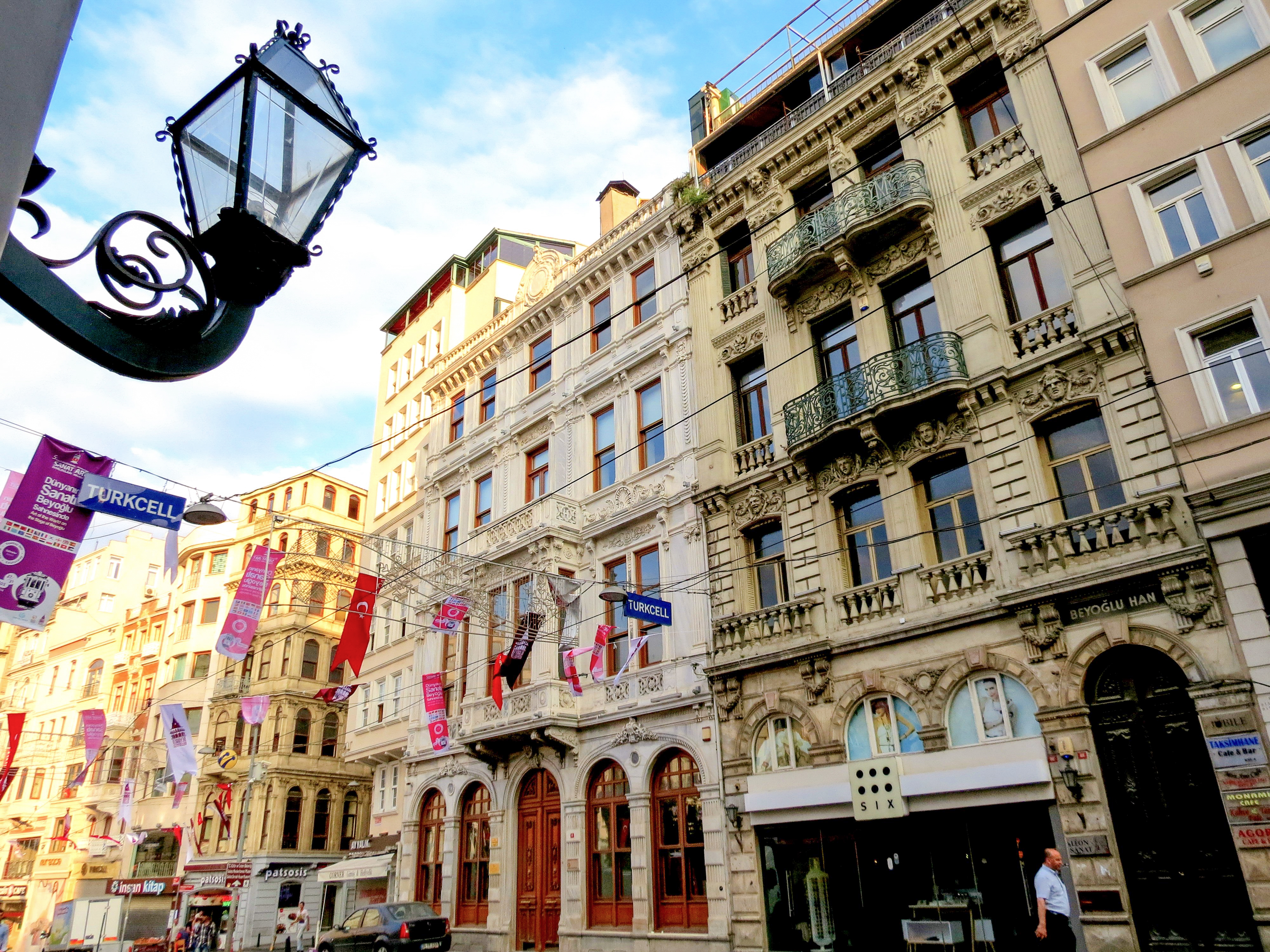
A view of Istiklal Avenue from the entrance of Galatasaray High School

On 19 March 2016, an Islamic State suicide bombing on Istiklal Avenue killed five people.

On 13 November 2022, a bomb explosion on Istiklal Avenue killed 6 people and left 81 injured. Police detained a Syrian woman, Ahlam Albashir, suspected of being a Kurdish insurgent having planted the bomb, in a sweep of 47 arrests.

== Notable buildings ==
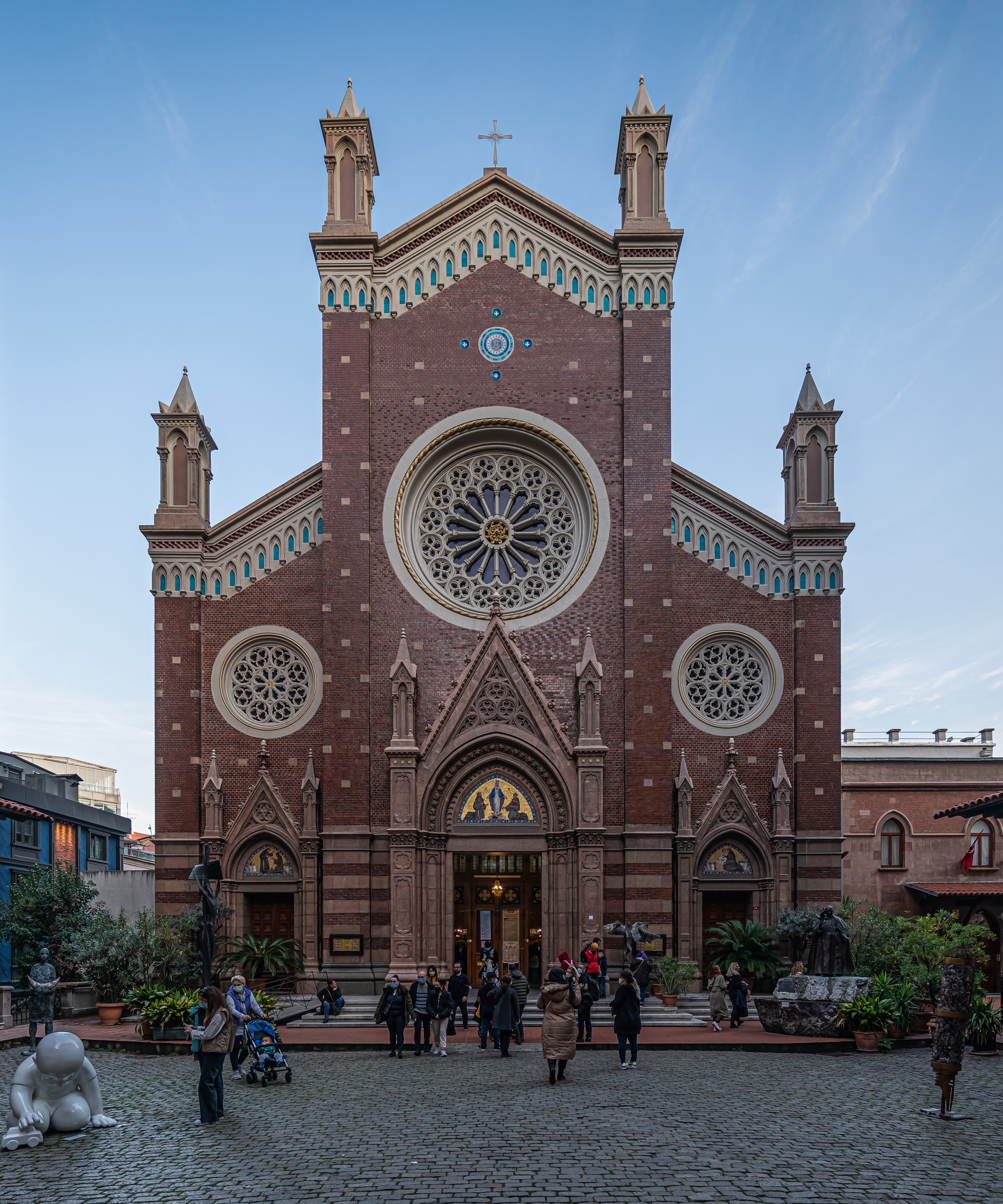
Church of Sant'Antonio di Padova on İstiklal Avenue, designed by Turkish Levantine architect Giulio Mongeri

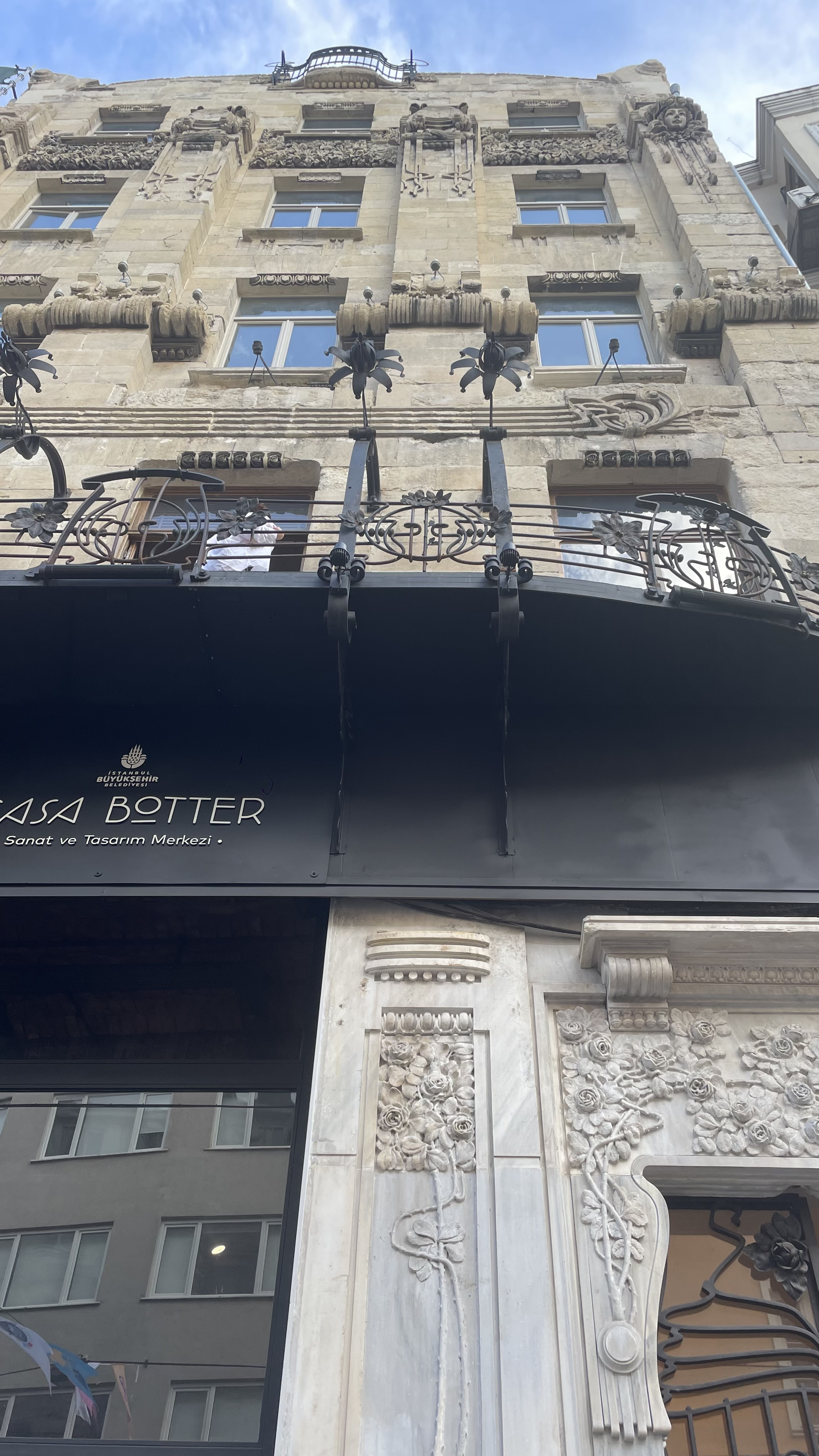
Casa Botter on İstiklal Avenue, designed by Raimondo D'Aronco

Religious buildings

- Church of Sant'Antonio di Padova
- Hagia Triada Greek Orthodox Church
- Church of Santa Maria Draperis
- Hüseyin Ağa Mosque

Schools

- Galatasaray High School

Historic buildings and residences

- Old Galatasaray Post Office
- Rumeli Pasajı (Cité Roumelie)
- Hazzopulo Pasajı
- Mısır Apartments
- Casa Botter, one of the finest examples of Art Nouveau architecture in Istanbul
- Grand Pera, home in the past to the Cercle d'Orient and now to Madame Tussauds Istanbul
- Tokatliyan Han, once home to the Grand Tokatliyan Hotel

Food and drink

- Çiçek Pasajı (Cité de Péra), site of the Naum Theatre until 1870
- Lebon Patisserie & Café, a defunct historic pastry shop and café
- Markiz Pastanesi, a renowned historic pâtisserie and chocolaterie
- Narmanlı Han, originally home to the Russian Embassy, later home to artist Aliye Berger, today houses cafés and restaurants

Diplomatic missions

- Palais de Hollande, Dutch Consulate
- Palais de France, French Consulate
- Greek Consulate
- Russian Palace, Russian Consulate
- Palais de Suède, Swedish Consulate

Culture and arts

- Istanbul Cinema Museum
- Yapı Kredi Art Gallery
- Beyoğlu Sanat Galerisi
- Akbank Sanat Galerisi
- SALT Beyoğlu
- Meşher Art Gallery

== See also ==
- Abdi İpekçi Avenue
- Bağdat Avenue
- Palais de France, Istanbul
- Palace of Venice, Istanbul
- List of upscale shopping districts
