= Beyoğlu =

District on the European side of Istanbul, Turkey

- District and municipality
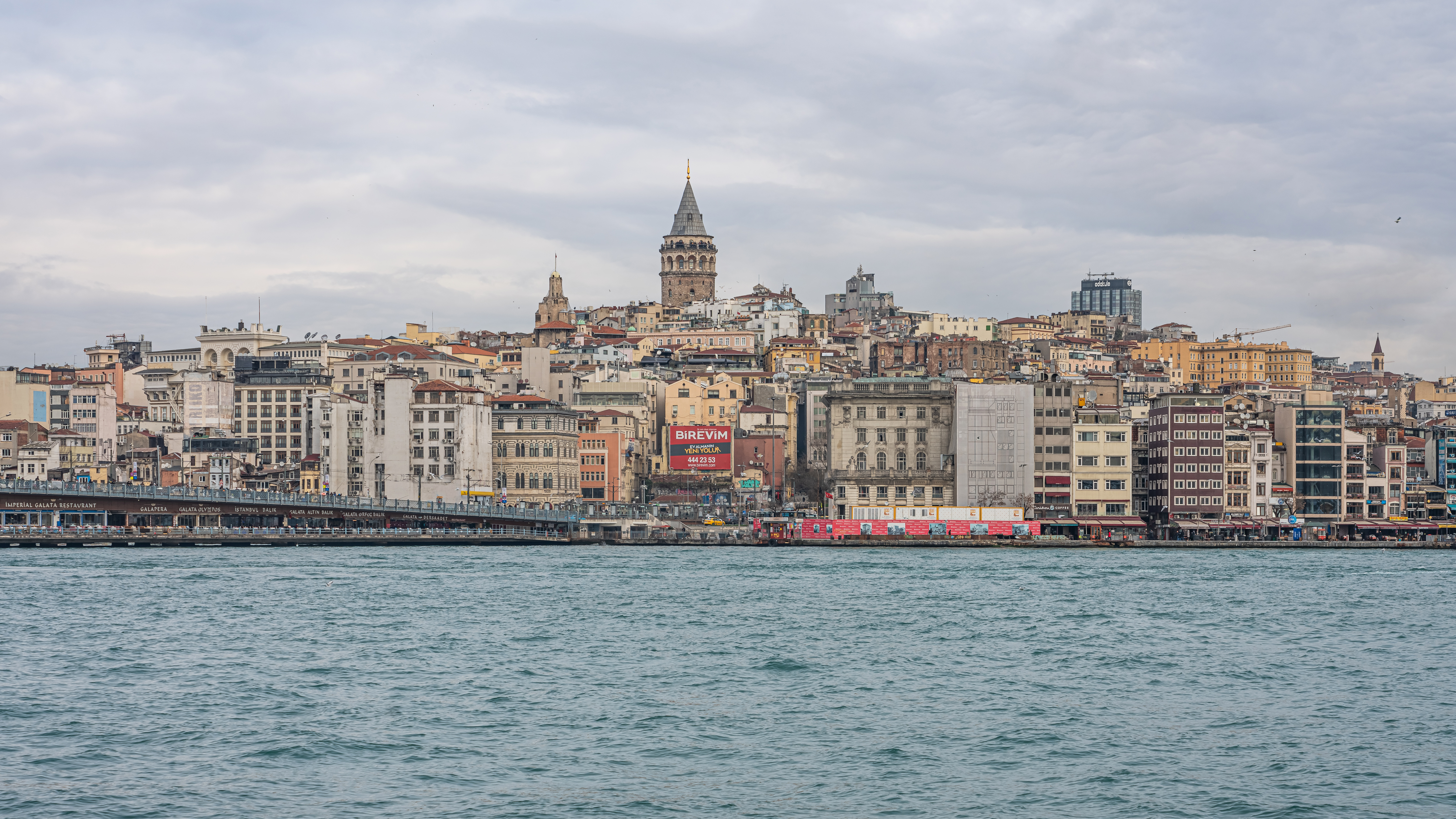
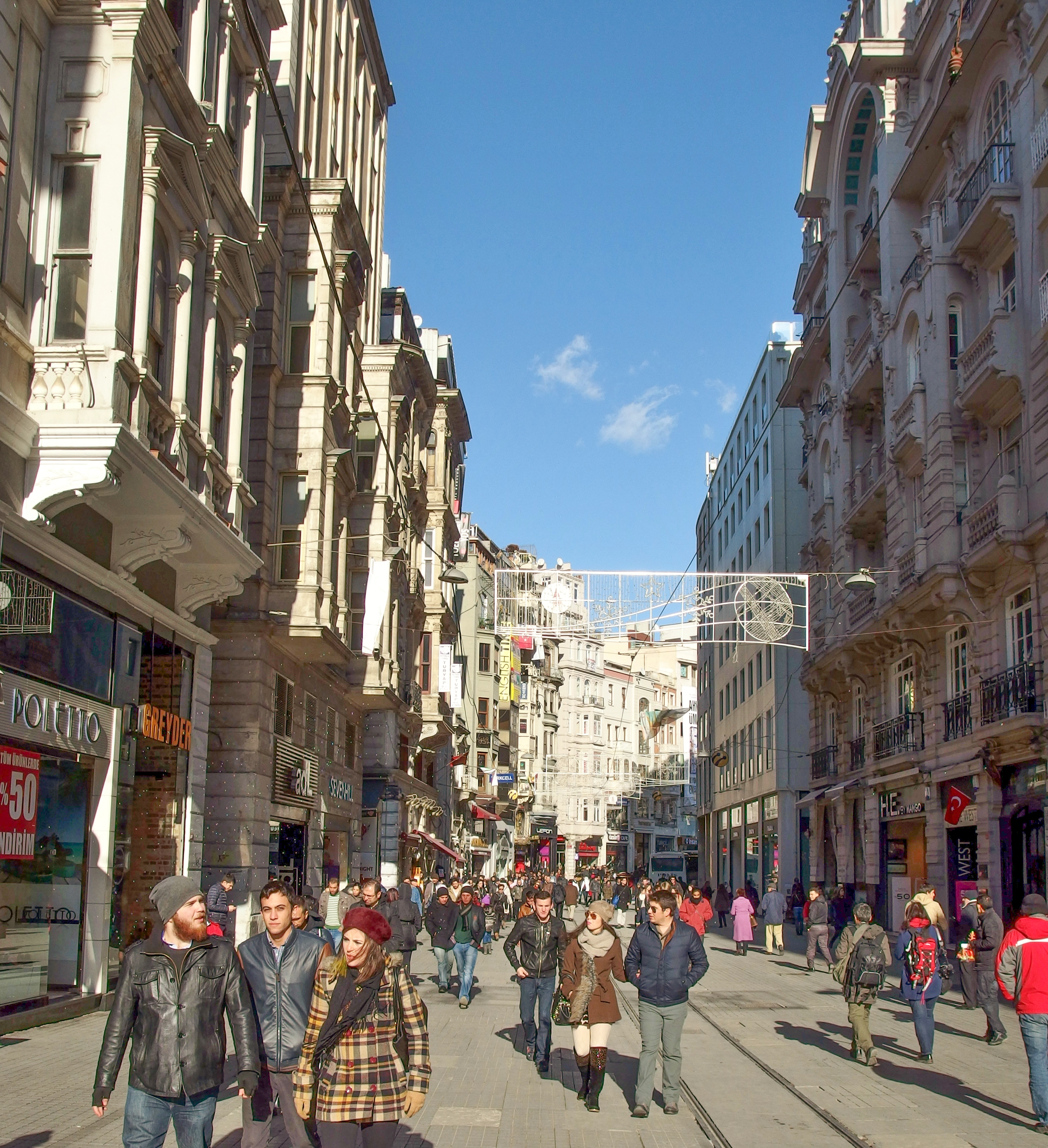
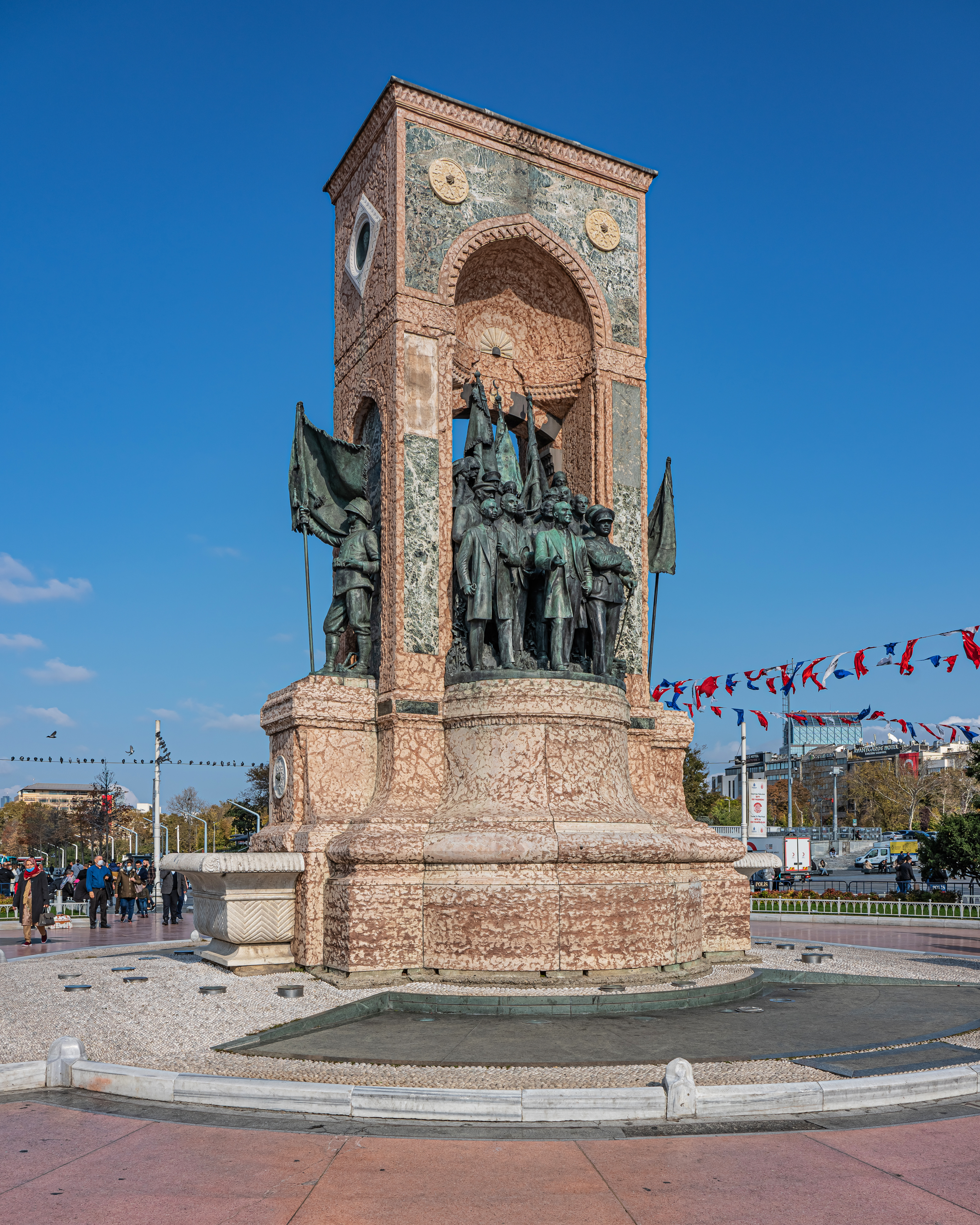
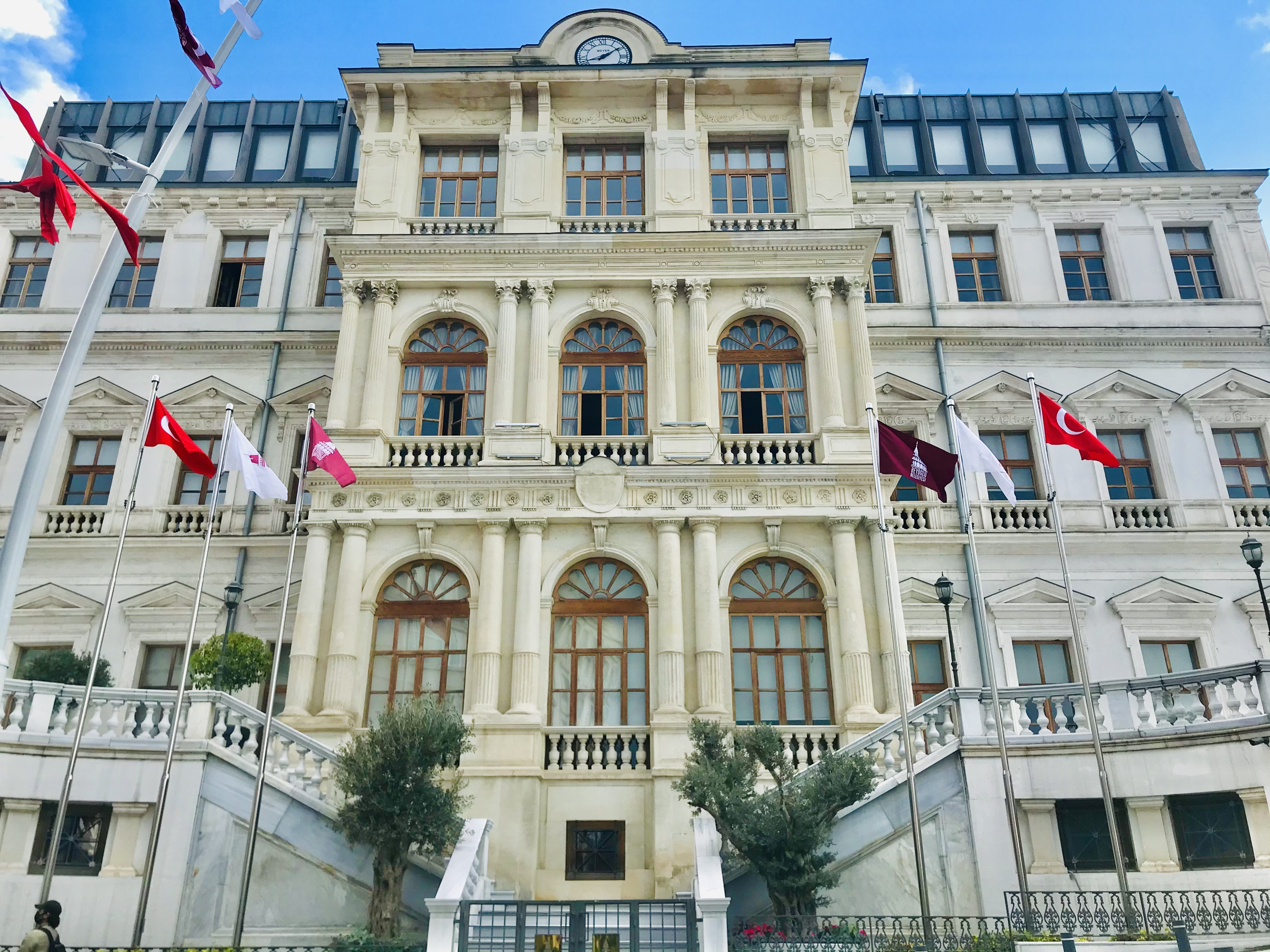
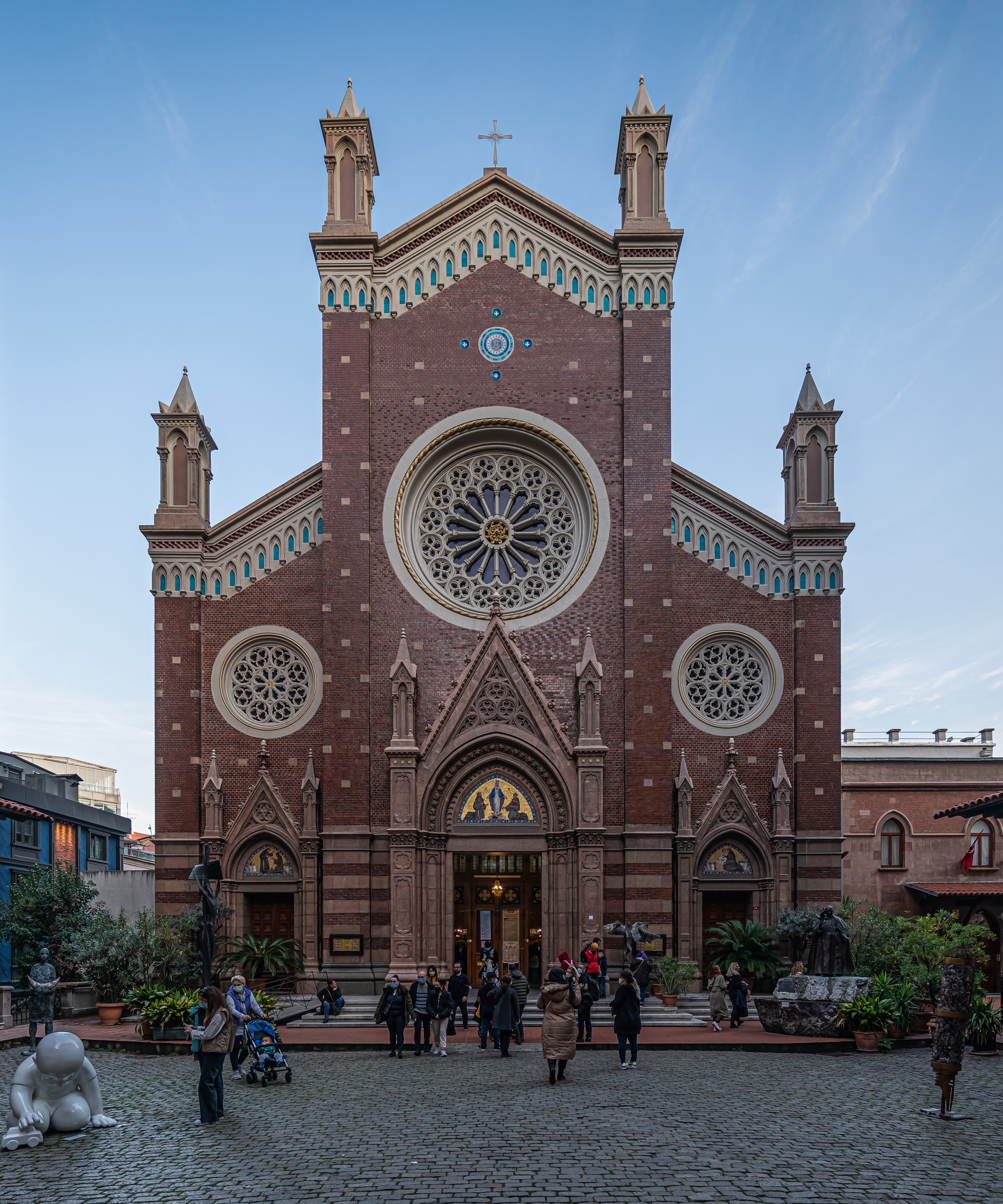
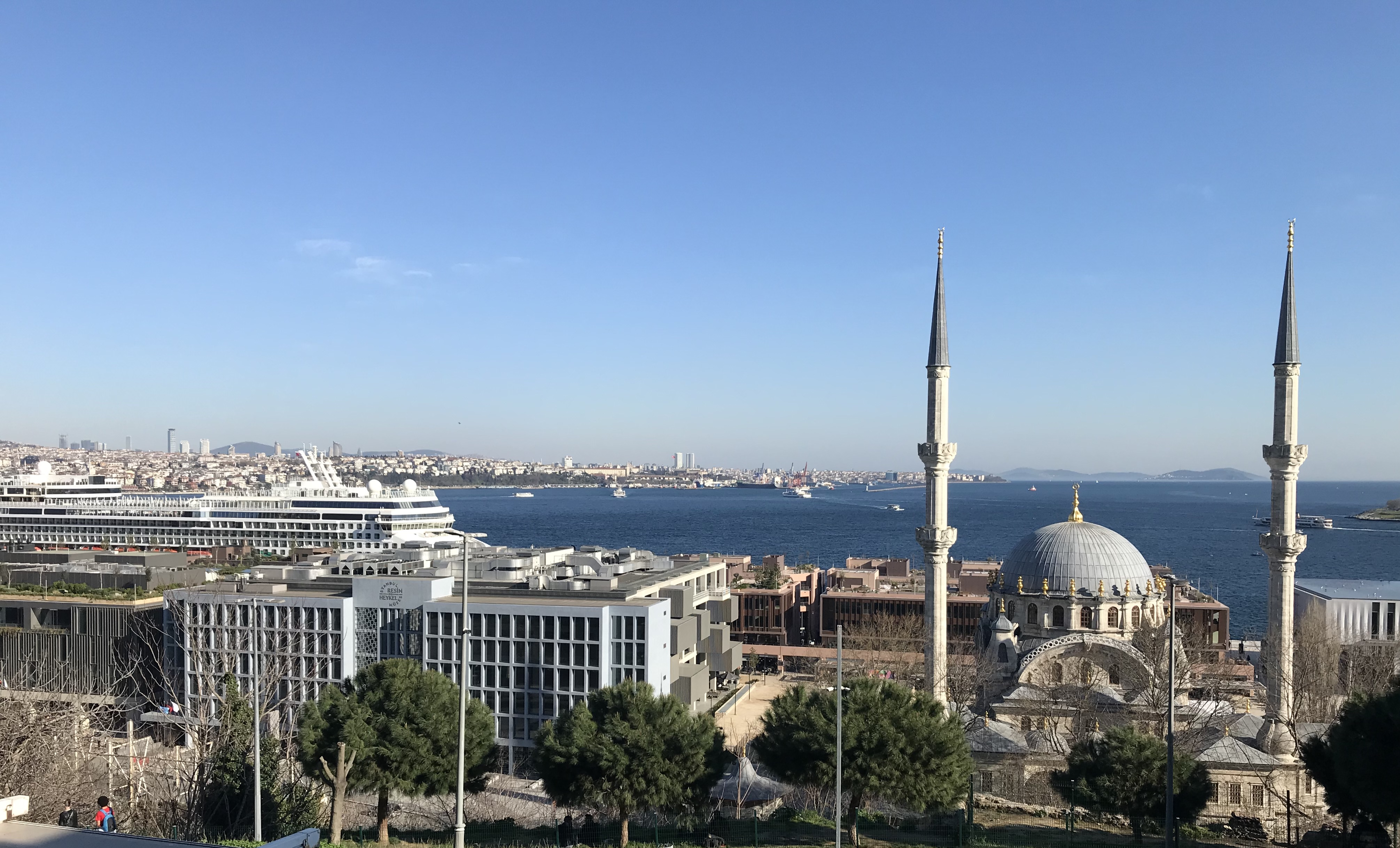
- Clockwise from top: Galata Tower; Republic Monument in Taksim; Church of Sant'Antonio di Padova; Galataport and Nusretiye Mosque; Beyoğlu Municipal Hall; and İstiklal Avenue

- Logo

- Map showing Beyoğlu District in Istanbul Province

- Location within Turkey Location within Istanbul
- Coordinates: 41°01′43″N 28°58′29″E
- Country: Turkey
- Province: Istanbul

Government
  - Mayor: İnan Güney (CHP)
- Area: 9 km^{2} (3.5 sq mi)
- Population (2022): 225,920
  - Density: 25,000/km^{2} (65,000/sq mi)
- Time zone: UTC+3 (TRT)
- Area code: 0212
- Website: www.beyoglu.bel.tr

Beyoğlu (Turkish: [ˈbejoːɫu]) is a municipality and district of Istanbul Province, Turkey. Its area is 9 km^{2} (3.5 sq mi), and its population is 225,920 as of 2022. It is on the European side of Istanbul, Turkey, separated from the old city (historic peninsula of Constantinople, today known as the Fatih district) by the Golden Horn.

Beyoğlu was historically known as Pera and was originally established in the Byzantine period. It was initially known as Sykai (Fig Orchard) or Peran en Sykais (The Fig Field on the Other Side), referring to the other side of the Golden Horn, opposite to the historical peninsula of Constantinople. The name was eventually shortened as Péra (Greek: Πέρα) which means "across" or "beyond" in Greek.

Pera, which also encompasses the citadel and port of Galata, grew significantly in the Middle Ages, when it was a colony of the Republic of Genoa between 1273 and 1453. The names "Pera" and "Galata" were used interchangeably in European sources and maps of the medieval period (e.g., the Podestà of Galata was also referred to as the Podestà of Pera), but in the following centuries, the name Galata (today known as Karaköy, a quarter within the Beyoğlu district) began to refer specifically to the port area and the adjacent neighbourhoods within the medieval Walls of Galata, while Pera (Beyoğlu) began to define the wider district, including the neighbourhoods that are further inland and outside of the citadel's walls. The Walls of Galata were largely demolished in the 19th century for enabling northward urban growth, but surviving portions of the citadel's walls still exist.

In the 19th century, Beyoğlu's population was largely composed of foreigners of European origin, including Catholic Levantines, along with local Christians and Jews. Several events in the 20th century have led to the emigration of the district's ethnic and religious minorities, mainly to Europe and North America. These events included the deportation of Armenians during World War I, which resulted in what numerous historians have defined as a genocide; the Law numbered 2007, passed on 11 June 1932, during the Great Depression, which banned foreigners from practicing certain professions in Turkey, in order to increase the number of available jobs for Turkish citizens (the ban was lifted with Article 35 of the Law numbered 4817 passed on 27 February 2003); the 1942 wealth tax during World War II, which was levied with much higher rates on non-Muslims; the Istanbul pogrom in 1955, which targeted the city's ethnic Greek population; the expulsion of Istanbulite Greeks without Turkish citizenship in 1964–1965, after Turkey and Greece came to the brink of war in 1964 over violent clashes in Cyprus (some of the remaining Greeks with Turkish citizenship decided to leave a decade later when Turkey invaded northern Cyprus in response to the 1974 Cypriot coup d'état supported by the Greek military junta for unifying the island with Greece); and the Turkish military coups of 1960, 1971 and 1980 (the latter two were triggered by the political violence between the far-left and far-right militant groups in Turkey throughout the 1970s, which had a devastating impact on the country's political system and economy). In these periods of turmoil and uncertainty, many residents of Beyoğlu decided to move to the less crowded and more secure districts and neighbourhoods of Istanbul. They were largely replaced by low-income workers from Anatolia who moved to Istanbul in the 1960s and 1970s for seeking employment opportunities in the city and began to settle in the side streets of Beyoğlu. This large-scale population movement led to the decay of numerous historic buildings between the 1960s and 1990s, some of which remained vacant for decades.

Urban renewal projects and gentrification in Beyoğlu started in the 1980s and 1990s. The restoration of the district's historic buildings, the pedestrianization of İstiklal Avenue and the reintroduction of the nostalgic trams in 1990, the opening of new restaurants, patisseries and cafés (as well as the revival of historic ones), and cultural events such as the Istanbul Film Festival have restored the previous charm of Beyoğlu, and many middle-income and high-income residents returned to the district, while real estate prices skyrocketed. Present-day Beyoğlu is one of the main centers for cultural activities, leisure and entertainment in Istanbul, with a vibrant night life.

The district encompasses numerous quarters and neighbourhoods, including Galata (modern-day Karaköy), Tophane, Cihangir, Şişhane, Tepebaşı, Tarlabaşı, Dolapdere and Kasımpaşa, and is connected to the old city center across the Golden Horn through the Galata Bridge, Atatürk Bridge and Golden Horn Metro Bridge. Istanbul's iconic İstiklal Avenue and Taksim Square are also located in the Beyoğlu district.

== Etymology ==
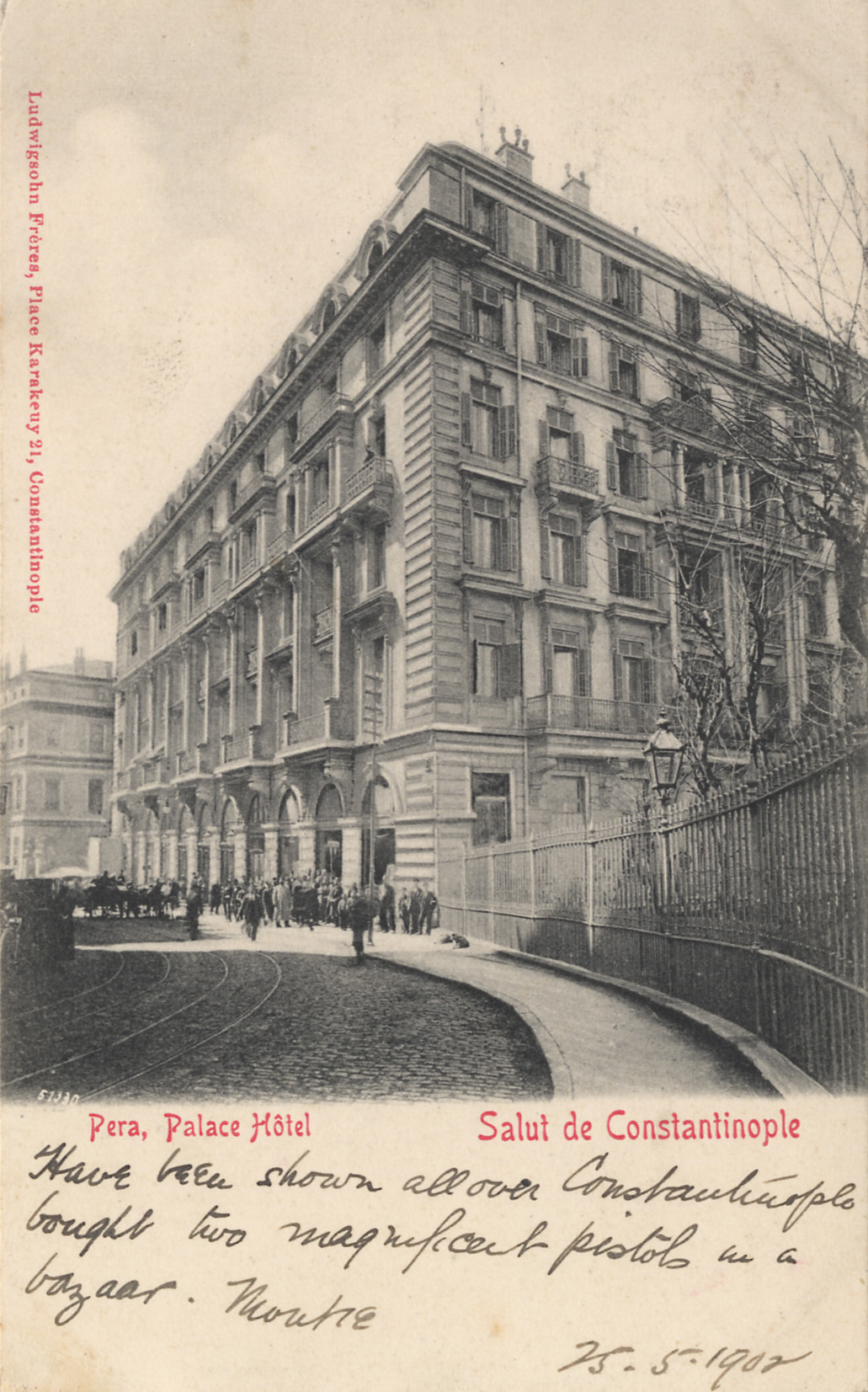
A postcard of the historic Pera Palace Hotel (1892)

Beyoğlu continued to be named Pera during the Middle Ages and, in Western languages, into the early 20th century, being used in place names such as the Pera Palace Hotel or the Grande Rue de Péra (Grand Avenue of Pera). Péra (Greek: Πέρα) means "across" or "beyond" in Greek, referring to its position when faced from the historical peninsula of Constantinople across the Golden Horn.

According to the prevailing theory, the Turkish name of Pera, Beyoğlu, meaning "Bey's Son" in Turkish, is a modification by folk etymology of the Venetian title of Bailo. The 15th century ambassador of Venice in Istanbul, Andrea Gritti (who later became the Doge of Venice in 1523) had a mansion in this area. His son Alvise Gritti, who had close relations with the Sublime Porte, also stayed there and was probably the person who was specifically referred to as Bey Oğlu after his father became the Doge of Venice. (Note: The Ottomans regarded the Venetian title of Doge as the equivalent of the Turkish title of Bey.) Located further south in Beyoğlu and originally built in the early 16th century, the Palace of Venice was the seat of the Bailo. That building was reconstructed several times over the centuries, with the last modifications in the 1910s, and currently hosts the Italian Consulate.

== History ==
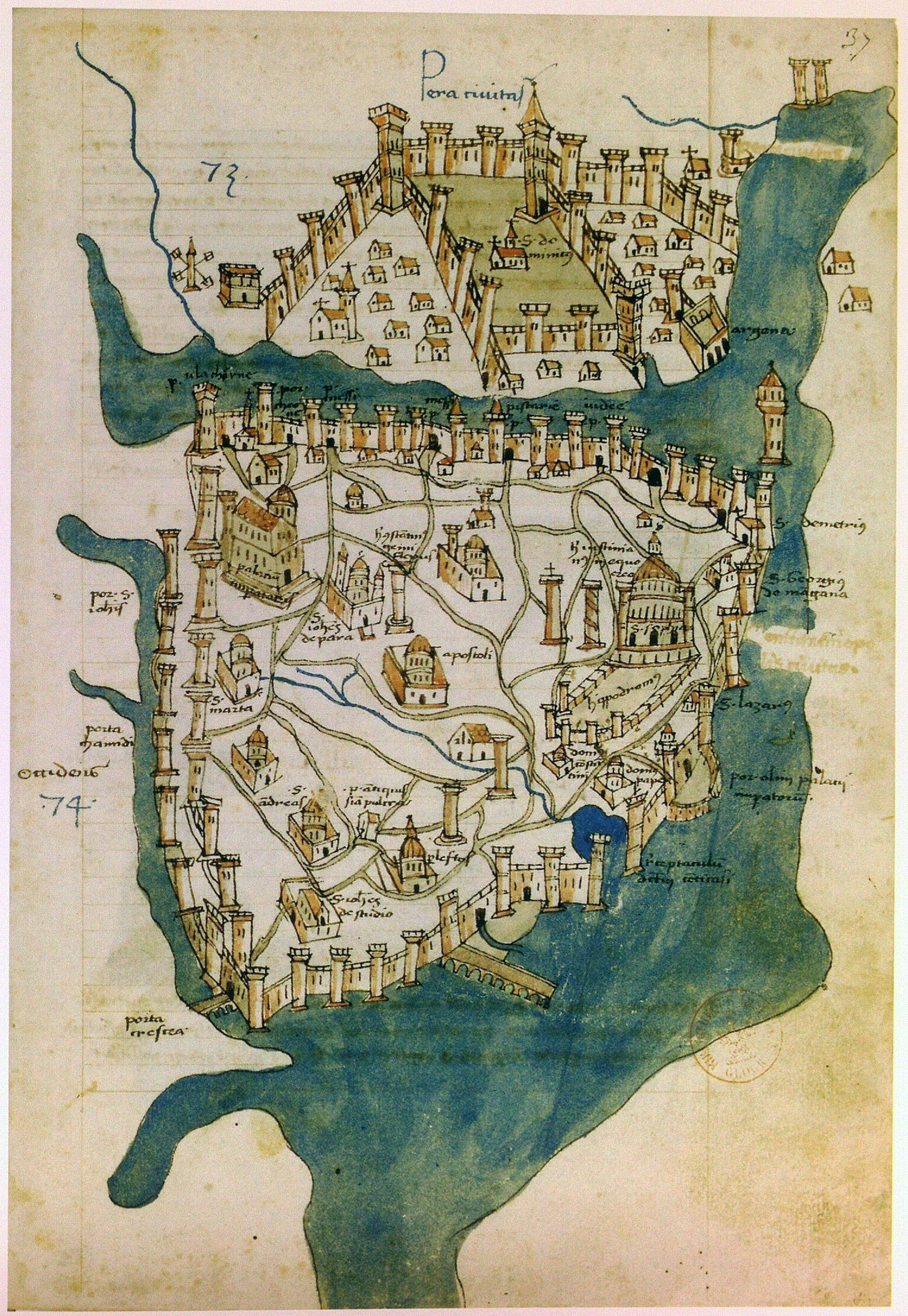
Map of Constantinople (1422) by Florentine cartographer Cristoforo Buondelmonti, showing (a greatly enlarged) Pera (Beyoğlu) at the north of the Golden Horn, with the peninsula of Constantinople to the south.

The area now known as Beyoğlu has been inhabited since Byzas founded the City of Byzantium in the 7th century BC, and predates the founding of Constantinople. During the Byzantine era, Greek speaking inhabitants named the hillside covered with orchards Sykai (The Fig Orchard), or Peran en Sykais (The Fig Field on the Other Side), referring to the "other side" of the Golden Horn. As the Byzantine Empire grew, so did Constantinople and its environs. The northern side of the Golden Horn became built up as a suburb of Byzantium as early as the 5th century. In this period the area began to be called Galata, and Emperor Theodosius II (reigned 402–450) built a fortress. The Greeks believe that the name comes either from galatas (meaning "milkman"), as the area was used by shepherds in the early medieval period, or from the word Galatai (meaning "Gauls"), as the Celtic tribe of Gauls were thought to have camped here during the Hellenistic period before settling into Galatia in central Anatolia, becoming known as the Galatians. The inhabitants of Galatia are famous for the Epistle to the Galatians and the Dying Galatian statue. The name may have also derived from the Italian word Calata, meaning "downward slope", as Galata, formerly a colony of the Republic of Genoa between 1273 and 1453, stands on a hilltop that goes downwards to the sea.

=== Genoese and Venetian periods ===
The area came to be the base of European merchants, particularly from Genoa and Venice, in what was then known as Pera. Following the Fourth Crusade in 1204, and during the Latin Empire of Constantinople (1204–1261), the Venetians became more prominent in Pera. The Dominican Church of St. Paul (1233), today known as the Arap Camii, is from this period.

In 1273 the Byzantine Emperor Michael VIII Palaiologos granted Pera to the Republic of Genoa in recognition of Genoa's support of the Empire after the Fourth Crusade and the sacking of Constantinople in 1204. Pera became a flourishing trade colony, ruled by a podestà.

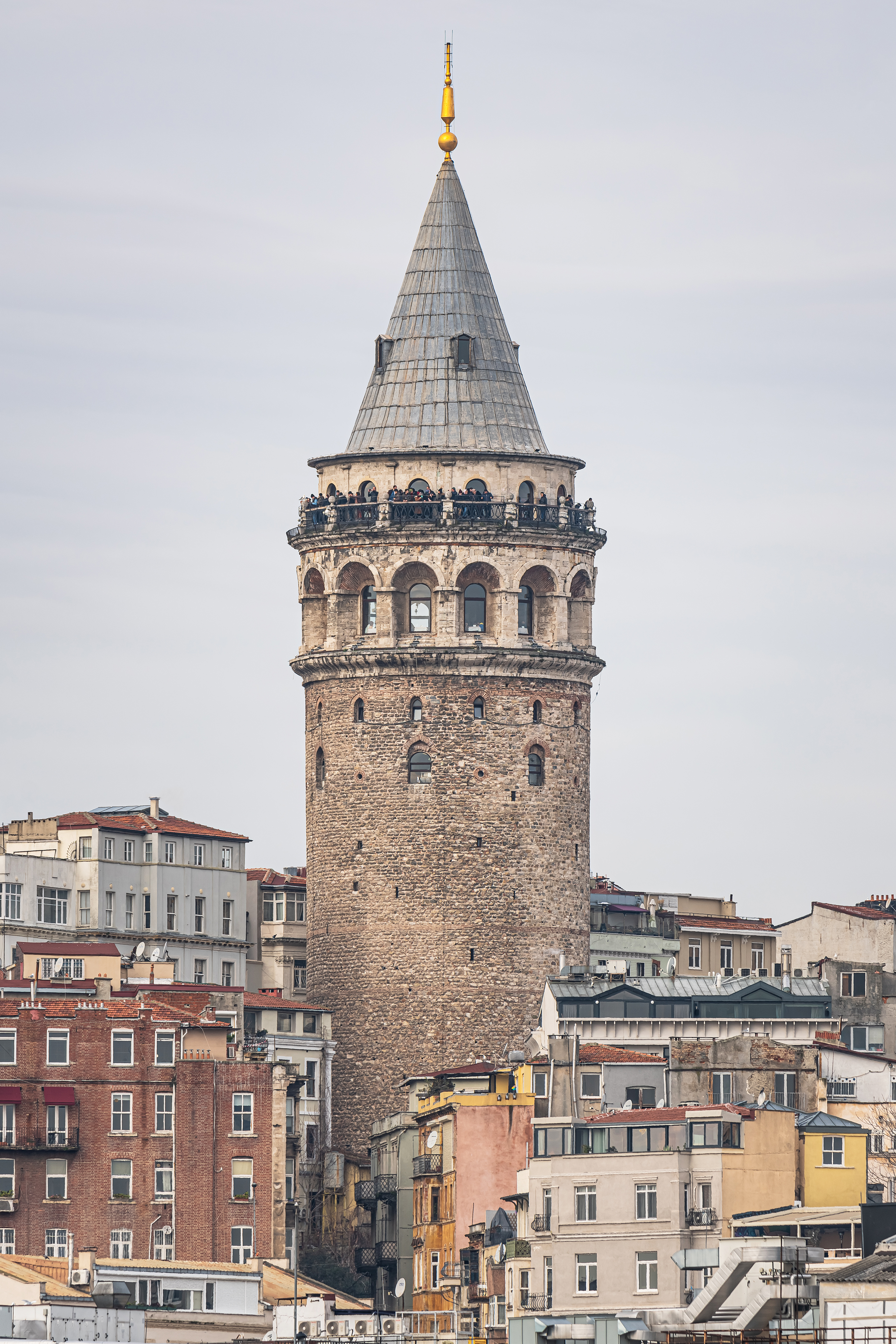
Galata Tower (1348) was built by the Genoese at the northern apex of the citadel of Galata.

The Genoese Palace (Palazzo del Comune) was built in 1316 by Montano De Marini, the Podestà of Galata (Pera), and still remains today in ruins on Kart Çınar Street parallel to Bankalar Caddesi (Banks Street) in Karaköy, along with nearby Genoese houses from the early 14th century.

In 1348 the Genoese built the famous Galata Tower, one of the most prominent landmarks of Istanbul. Pera (Galata) remained under Genoese control until May 29, 1453, when it was conquered by the Ottomans along with the rest of the city, after the Siege of Constantinople.

During the Byzantine period, the Genoese Podestà ruled over the Italian community of Galata (Pera), which was mostly made up of the Genoese, Venetians, Tuscans and Ragusans.

Venice, Genoa's archrival, regained control in the strategic citadel of Galata (Pera), which they were forced to leave in 1261 when the Byzantines retook Constantinople and brought an end to the Latin Empire (1204–1261) that was established by Enrico Dandolo, the Doge of Venice.

In 1432, Bertrandon de la Broquière described Pera as "a large town, inhabited by Greeks, Jews and Genoese: the last are masters of it, under the Duke of Milan, (Note: Genoa was controlled by the Duchy of Milan between 1353–1356 and 1421–1435. The Duke of Milan mentioned by Bertrandon de la Broquière is Filippo Maria Visconti, who reigned between 1412–1447.) who styles himself Lord of Pera ... The port is the handsomest of all I have seen, and I believe I may add, of any in the possession of the Christians, for the largest Genoese vessels may lie alongside the quay."

Following the Ottoman siege of Constantinople in 1453, during which the Genoese sided with the Byzantines and defended the city together with them, the Ottoman Sultan Mehmed II allowed the Genoese (who had fled to their colonies in the Aegean Sea such as Lesbos and Chios) to return to the city, but Galata was no longer run by a Genoese Podestà.

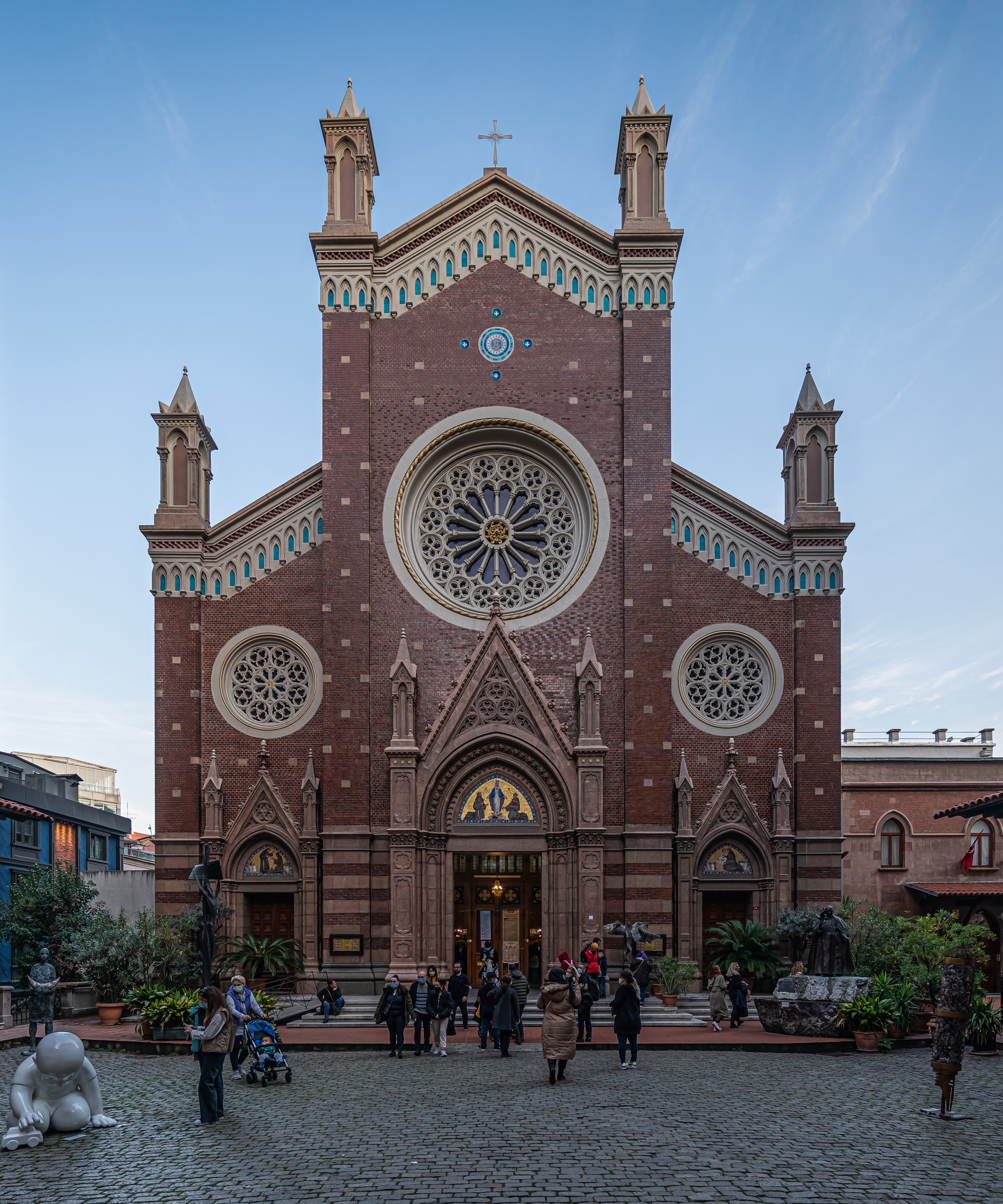
S. Antonio di Padova on İstiklal Avenue in Beyoğlu, designed by Giulio Mongeri, is the largest Catholic church in Istanbul and in all of Turkey.

The first Venetian Bailo of Constantinople, headquartered in Pera, was appointed in 1268 (seven years after the fall of the Latin Empire), during the late Byzantine period. Following the Ottoman conquest of Constantinople (Istanbul) in 1453, the Republic of Venice sought to establish close political and commercial ties with the Ottoman Empire, and sent Gentile Bellini to paint a portrait of Mehmed II. It was also the Venetians who recommended Leonardo da Vinci to Bayezid II when the Sultan mentioned his intention to construct a bridge over the Golden Horn. Leonardo designed his proposed Galata Bridge in 1502, which was never built, but a miniature version was constructed almost five centuries later in Ås, Norway, in 2000.

The Bailo's seat was the Palace of Venice, originally built in Beyoğlu (Pera) in the early 16th century and reconstructed several times since then. After having served as the embassy of the French Empire following the fall of the Republic of Venice in 1797, and later as the embassy of the Austrian Empire when the Kingdom of Lombardy–Venetia was a constituent land (crown land) of the Habsburg monarchy between 1815 and 1866, the Palace of Venice ultimately became the embassy of the Kingdom of Italy and remained as such until 1923, when Ankara became the capital of the Republic of Turkey and the Palace of Venice became the Italian Consulate in Istanbul.

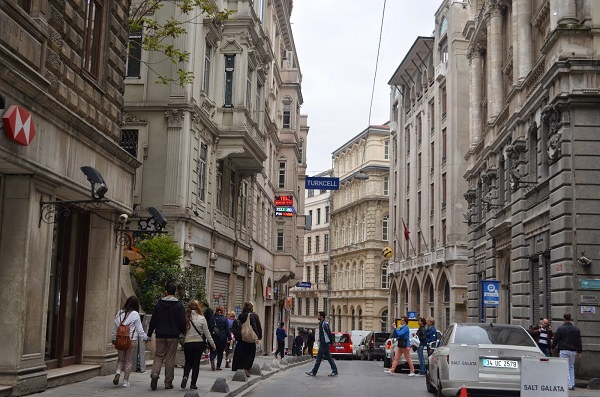
Bankalar Caddesi (Banks Street) in the Galata quarter of Beyoğlu was the financial center of the Ottoman Empire.

The Ottoman Empire had an interesting relationship with the Republic of Venice. Even though the two states often went to war over the control of East Mediterranean territories and islands, they were keen on restoring their trade pacts once the wars were over, such as the renewed trade pacts of 1479, 1503, 1522, 1540, and 1575, following major sea wars between the two sides. The Venetians were also the first Europeans to taste Ottoman delicacies such as coffee, centuries before other Europeans saw coffee beans for the first time in their lives during the Battle of Vienna in 1683. These encounters can be described as the beginning of today's rich "coffee culture" in both Venice (and later the rest of Italy) and Vienna.

Following the conquest of Constantinople and Pera in 1453, the coast and the low-lying areas were quickly settled by the Turks, but the European presence in the area did not end. Several Roman Catholic churches, as St. Anthony of Padua, SS. Peter and Paul in Galata and St. Mary Draperis were established for the needs of the Levantine population.

=== 19th century ===
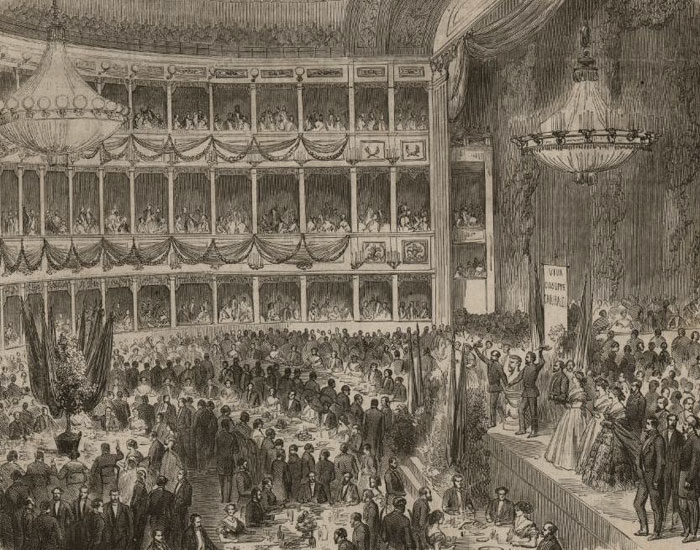
A reception held at the Naum Theatre in honour of Giuseppe Garibaldi, who had lived and worked (as a teacher) in the Pera district of Constantinople (Istanbul) between 1828 and 1831. The Naum Theatre seen in this illustration served as the chief opera house of Constantinople, until it was destroyed by a fire in 1870.

During the 19th century it was again home to many European traders, and housed many embassies, especially along the Grande Rue de Péra (today İstiklâl Avenue). Reyhan Zetler stated "Pera was considered to be a small copy of the [sic] 19th century Europe (especially Paris and London)." The presence of such a prominent European population - commonly referred to as Levantines - made it the most Westernized part of Constantinople, especially when compared to the Old City at the other side of the Golden Horn, and allowed for influxes of modern technology, fashion, and arts. Thus, Pera was one of the first parts of Constantinople to have telephone lines, electricity, trams, municipal government and even an underground railway, the Tünel, inaugurated in 1875 as the world's second subway line (after London's Underground) to carry the people of Pera up and down from the port of Galata and the nearby business and banking district of Karaköy, where the Bankalar Caddesi (Avenue of the Banks), the financial center of the Ottoman Empire, is located. The theatre, cinema, patisserie and café culture that still remains strong in Beyoğlu dates from this late Ottoman period. Shops like İnci, famous for its chocolate mousse and profiteroles, predate the founding of the republic and survived until recently.

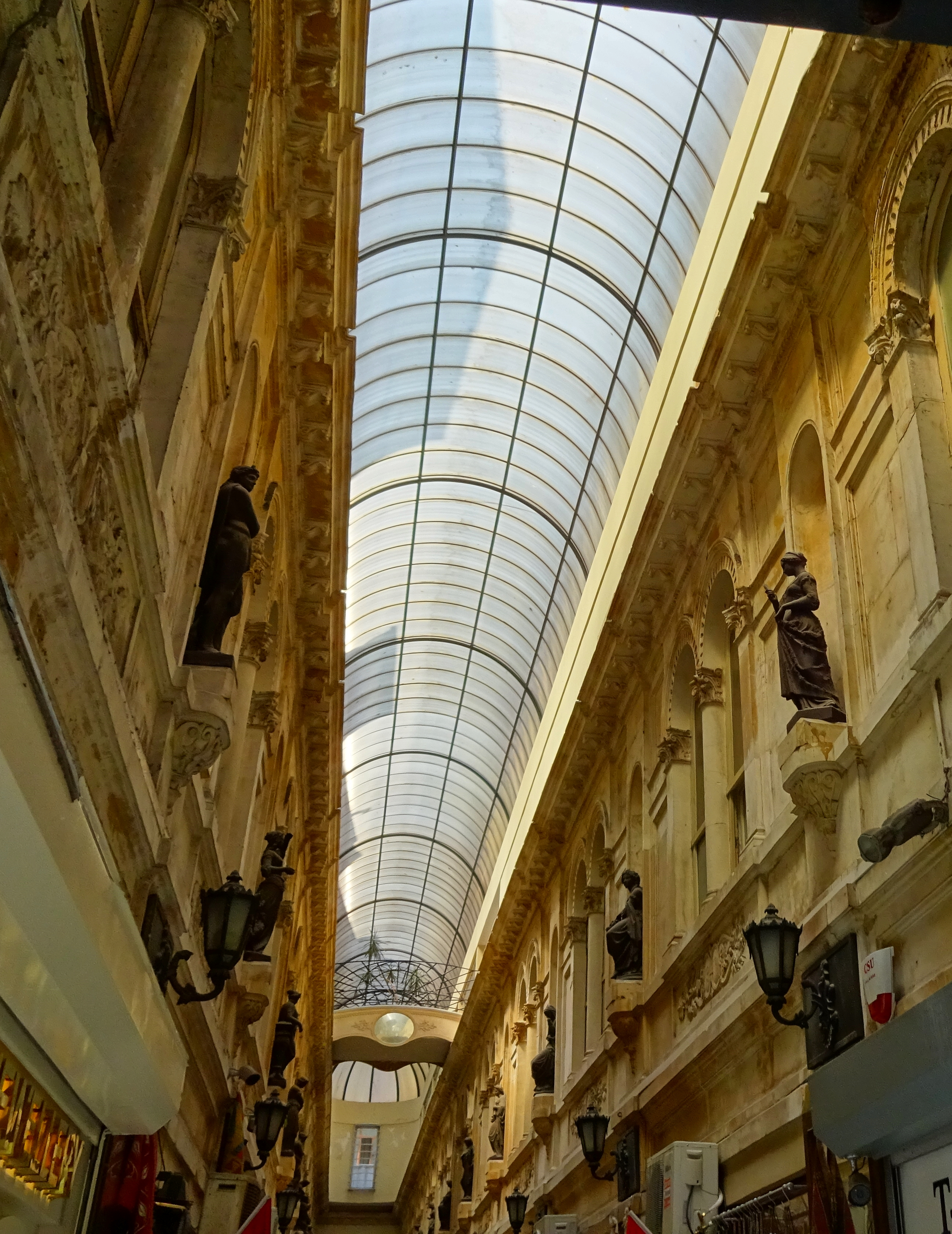
Statues and glass ceiling of Avrupa Pasajı (European Arcade in Turkish) or Passage d'Europe, built in 1874

Pera and Galata in the late 19th and early 20th centuries were a part of the Municipality of the Sixth Circle (French: Municipalité du VI^{ème} Cercle), established under the laws of 11 Jumada al-Thani (Djem. II) and 24 Shawwal (Chev.) 1274, in 1858; the organisation of the central city in the city walls, "Stamboul" (Turkish: İstanbul), was not affected by these laws. All of Constantinople was in the Prefecture of the City of Constantinople (French: Préfecture de la Ville de Constantinople).

The foreign communities also built their own schools, many of which went on to educate the elite of future generations of Turks, and still survive today as some of the best schools in Istanbul (see list of schools in Istanbul).

The rapid modernization which took place in Europe and left Ottoman Turkey behind was symbolized by the differences between Beyoğlu, and the historic Turkish quarters such as Eminönü and Fatih across the Golden Horn, in the Old City. When the Ottoman sultans finally initiated a modernization program with the Edict of Tanzimat (Reorganization) in 1839, they started constructing numerous buildings in Pera that mixed traditional Ottoman styles with newer European ones.

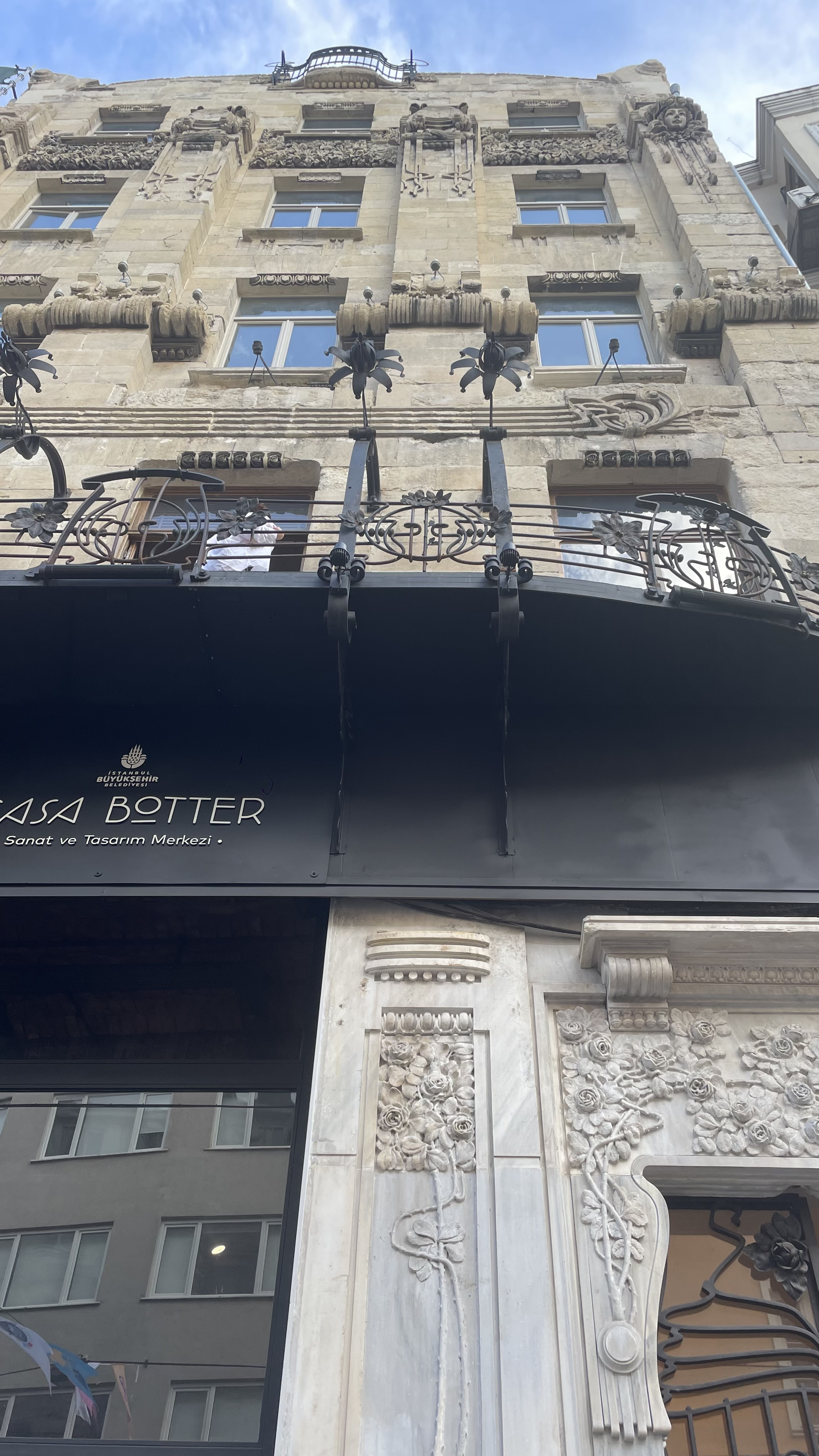
Casa Botter on İstiklal Avenue, designed by Raimondo D'Aronco

In addition, Sultan Abdülmecid stopped living in the Topkapı Palace and built a new palace near Pera, called the Dolmabahçe Palace, which blended the Neo-Classical, Baroque and Rococo styles.

During the aerial raid of 18 October 1918, in the final stages of World War I, a few sites within the district of Beyoğlu were hit.

=== 20th and 21st centuries ===
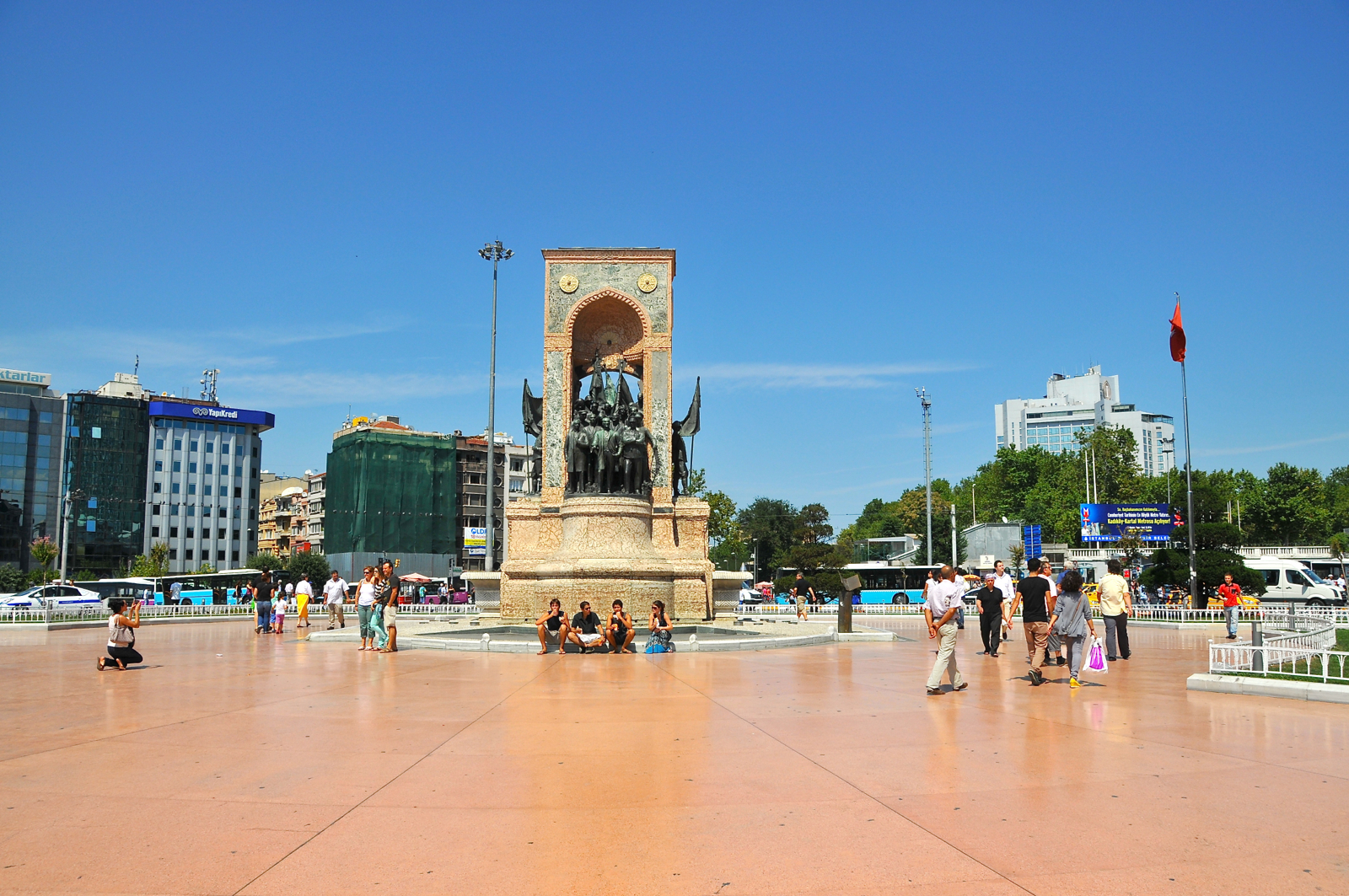
A view of Taksim Square with the Monument of the Republic (1928) designed by Pietro Canonica

When the Ottoman Empire collapsed and the Turkish Republic was founded (during and after the First World War) Pera, which became known as Beyoğlu, went into gradual decline. The decline accelerated with the departure of the large Greek population of Beyoğlu and adjacent Galata as a result of Turkish pressure over the Cyprus conflict, during the 1950s and 1960s. The widespread political violence between leftist and rightist groups which troubled Turkey in the late 1970s also severely affected the lifestyle of the district, and accelerated its decline with the flight of the middle-class citizens to newer suburban areas such as Levent and Yeşilköy.

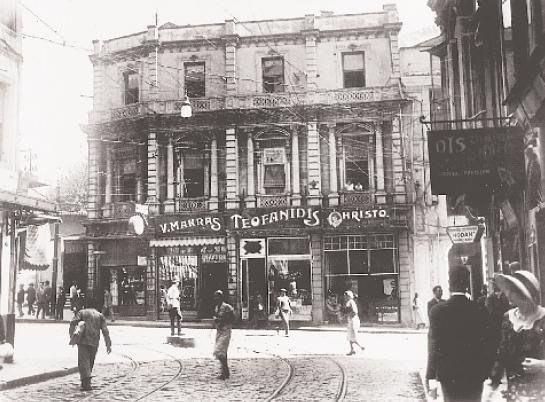
Greek shops on İstiklal Avenue in Beyoğlu in the 1930s

By the late 1980s, many of the grandiose Neoclassical and Art Nouveau apartment-blocks, formerly the residences of the late Ottoman élite, had become the homes of immigrants from Anatolia. While Beyoğlu continued to enjoy a reputation for its cosmopolitan and sophisticated atmosphere until the 1940s and 1950s, by the 1980s the area had become economically and socially troubled.

The first decades of the 21st century have witnessed the rapid gentrification of these neighborhoods. Istiklal Avenue has once again become a destination for tourists, and formerly bohemian neighborhoods like Cihangir have once again become fashionable and quite expensive. Some 19th and early 20th century buildings have been tastefully restored, while others have been converted into mammoth luxury malls of dubious aesthetic value. As newer, more international and affluent residents have begun to creep down the hills into Tophane and Tarlabasi, disagreements with more conservative elements in the neighborhoods have become common.

The low-lying areas such as Tophane, Kasımpaşa and Karaköy, and the side-streets of the area consist of older buildings.

== Infrastructure ==
=== Roads ===
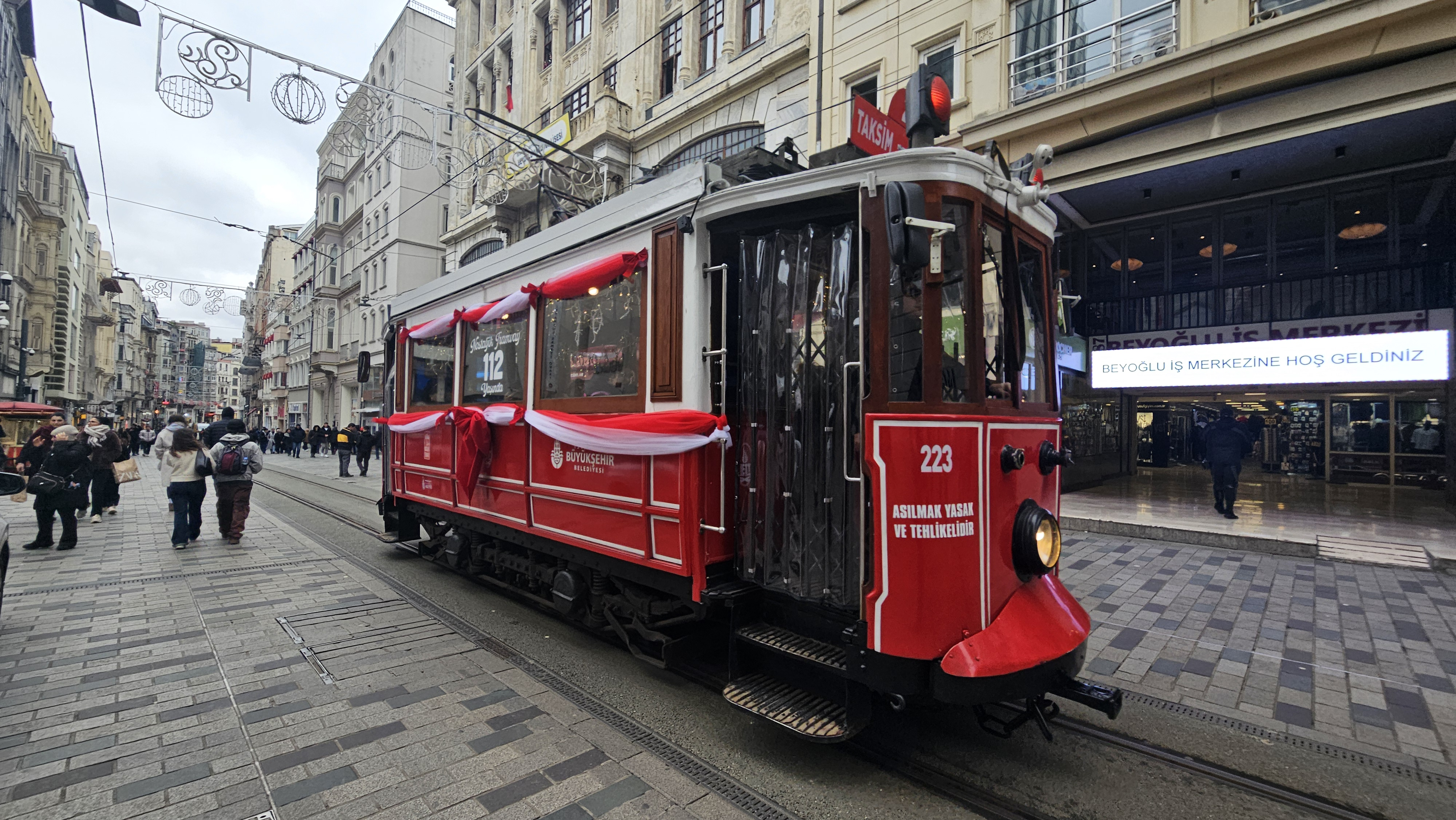
A nostalgic tram on İstiklal Avenue, decorated for the 112th anniversary of Istanbul's electric-powered tram service which began in 1914, replacing the horse-drawn tram service between 1872 and 1914

Parallel to İstiklal Avenue runs the wide bi-directional boulevard named Tarlabaşı Caddesi, which carries most of the traffic through the area and was constructed in the 1980s. The streets on either side of this road contain historic buildings and churches. The once cosmopolitan areas surrounding them have deteriorated. However, recent gentrification projects have seen some of the buildings restored.

Istanbul's first beltway, the Kasımpaşa-Hasköy Tunnel, Piyalepaşa Avenue, Meclis-i Mebusan Avenue and Kulturuş Deresi Avenue are other major thoroughfares.

Many Istanbul bus lines and the Istanbul Metrobus (only the Halıcıoğlu stop) provide transportation to the district.

=== Rail transport ===
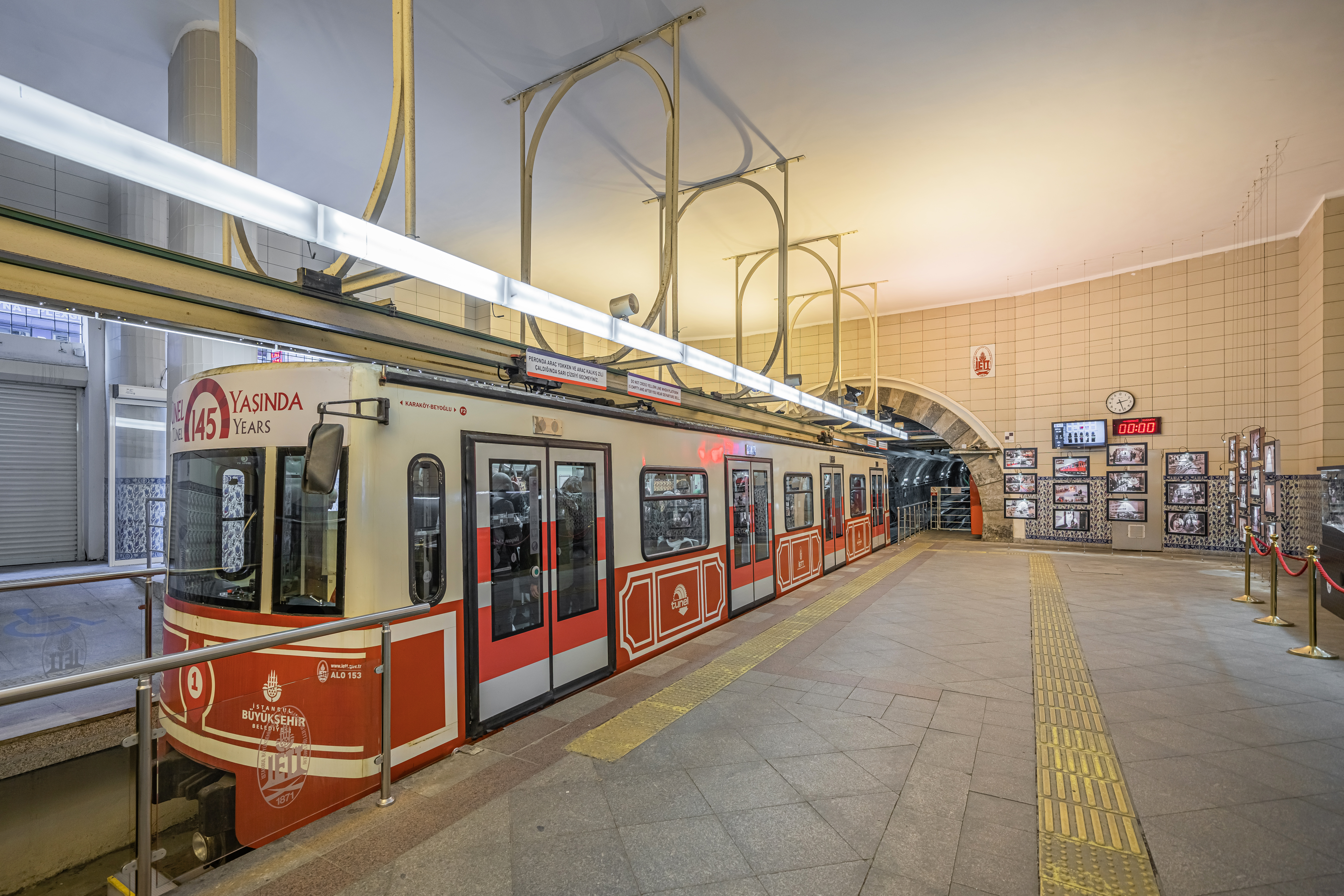
The Tünel was inaugurated on January 17, 1875, making it the second-oldest underground urban railway in the world after the London Underground which opened on January 10, 1863. It was originally powered by two 150 HP steam-power plants. Wagons were lit up with gas lamps due to the lack of electric power in that period.

The Istanbul metro M2 line runs through the district via Taksim and Şişhane stations. The T1 tram line runs in the district between the Kabataş and Karaköy stops and the T2 nostalgic tram line runs on the Istiklal Avenue. Funicular lines F1 and Tünel also provide transport for the district.

== Culture ==
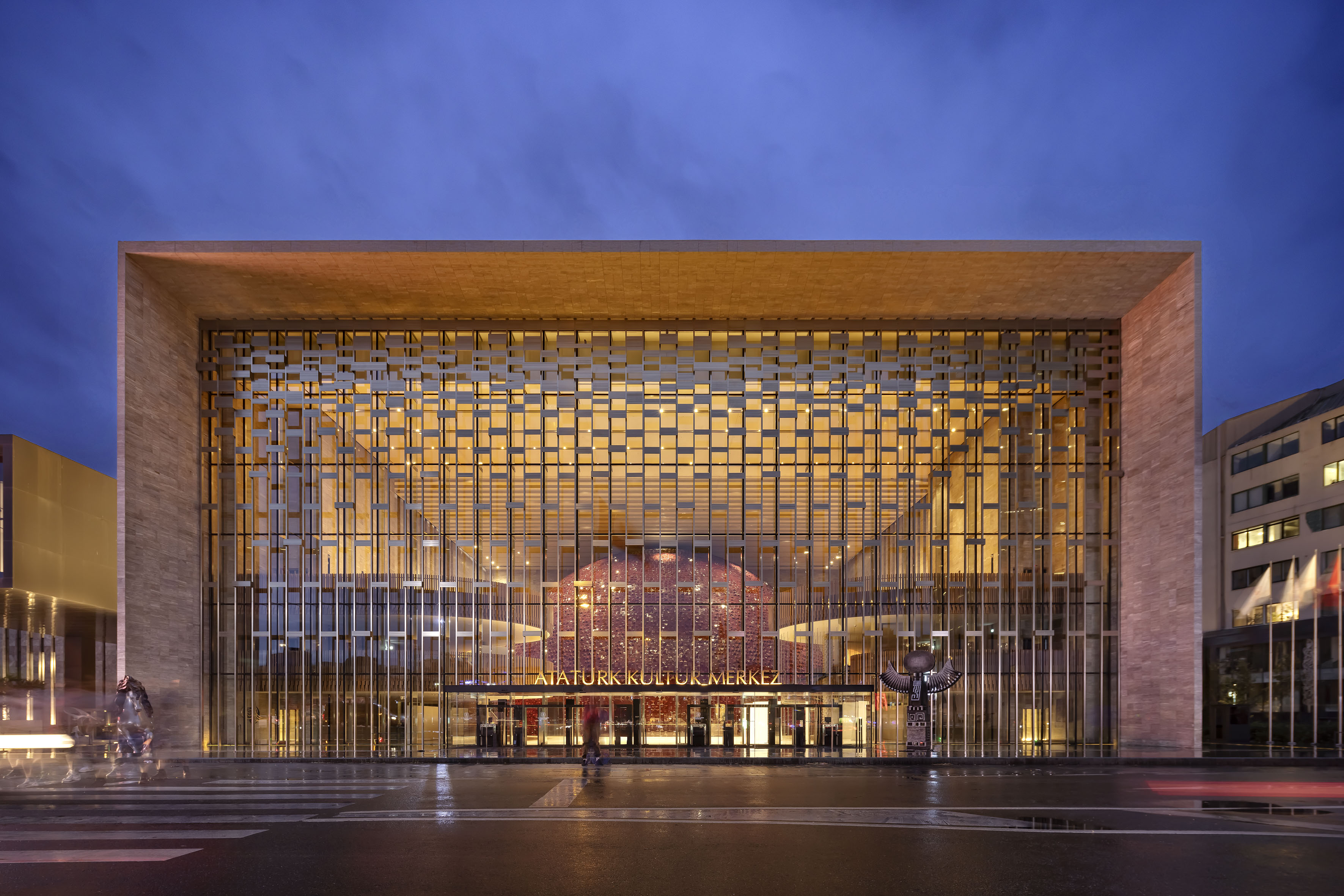
Atatürk Cultural Center is the main opera hall in the city

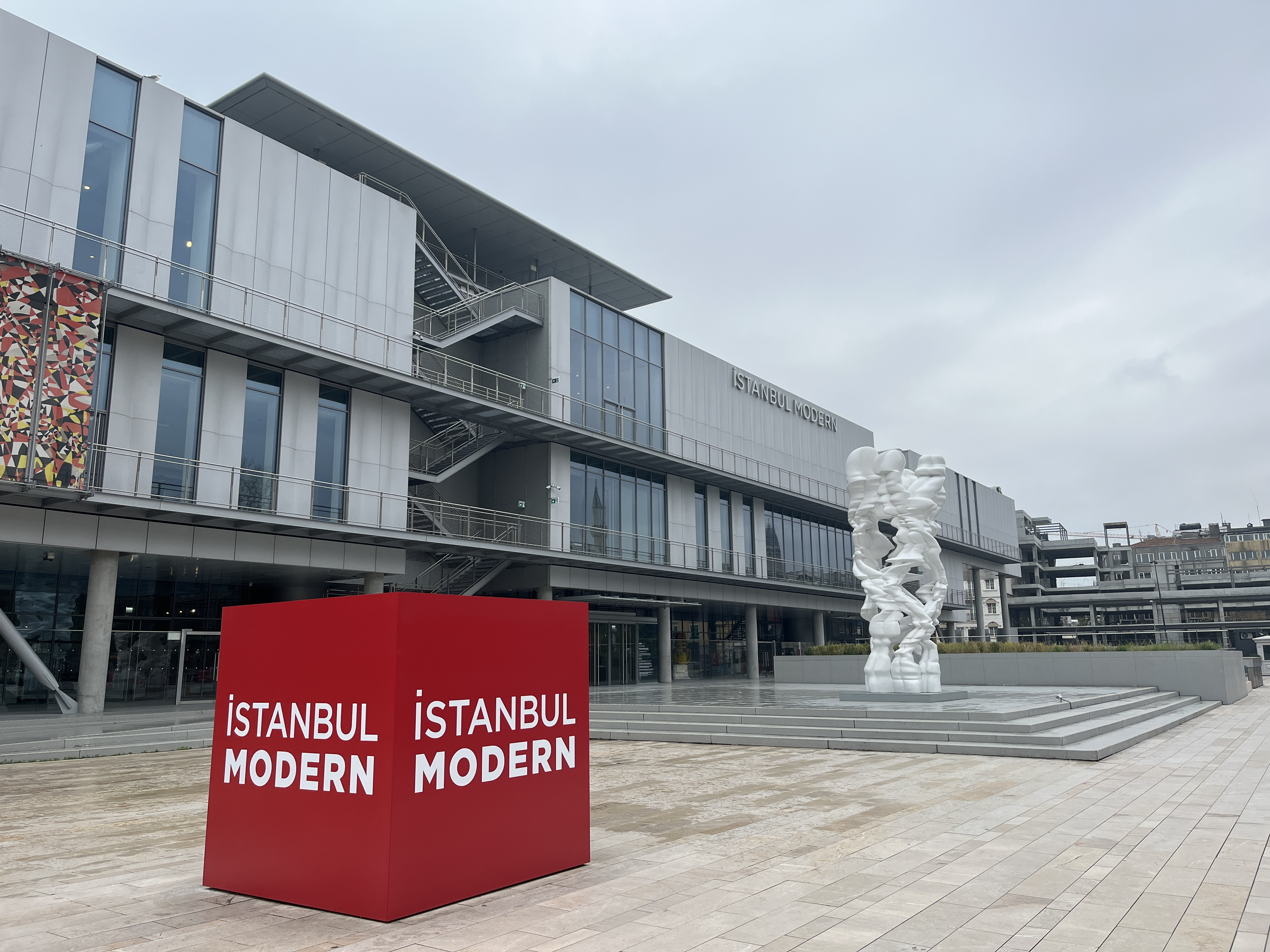
The Istanbul Modern Art Museum designed by Renzo Piano

Foreigners, especially from Euro-Mediterranean and West European countries, have long resided in Beyoğlu. There is a cosmopolitan atmosphere in the heart of the district, where people from various cultures live in Cihangir and Gümüşsuyu. Beyoğlu also has a number of historical Tekkes and Türbes. Several Sufi orders, such as the Cihangirî (pronounced Jihangiri) order, were founded here.

Most of the consulates (former embassies until 1923, when Ankara became the new Turkish capital) are still in this area; the Italian, British, German, Greek, Russian, Dutch, and Swedish consulates are significant in terms of their history and architecture.

Beyoğlu is also home to many high schools like Galatasaray Lisesi, Deutsche Schule Istanbul, St. George's Austrian High School, Lycée Sainte Pulchérie, Liceo Italiano, Beyoğlu Anatolian High School, Beyoğlu Kız Lisesi, Zografeion Lyceum, Zappeion Lyceum, and numerous others.

The unique international art project United Buddy Bears was presented in Beyoğlu during the winter of 2004–2005.

=== Tourism ===
The main thoroughfare is İstiklâl Caddesi, running into the neighbourhood from Taksim Square, a pedestrianised 1 mile (1.6 km) long street of shops, cafés, patisseries, restaurants, pubs, winehouses and clubs, as well as bookshops, theatres, cinemas and art galleries. Some of İstiklâl Avenue has a 19th-century metropolitan character, and the avenue is lined with Neoclassical and Art Nouveau buildings.

The nostalgic tram which runs on İstiklal Avenue, between Taksim Square and Tünel Square, was also reinstalled in 1990 with the aim of reviving the historic atmosphere of the district.

Some of the city's historic pubs and winehouses are located in the areas around İstiklal Avenue (İstiklal Caddesi) in Beyoğlu. The 19th-century Çiçek Pasajı (literally Flower Passage in Turkish, or Cité de Péra in French, opened in 1876) on İstiklal Avenue can be described as a miniature version of the famous Galleria in Milan, Italy, and has rows of historic pubs, winehouses and restaurants.

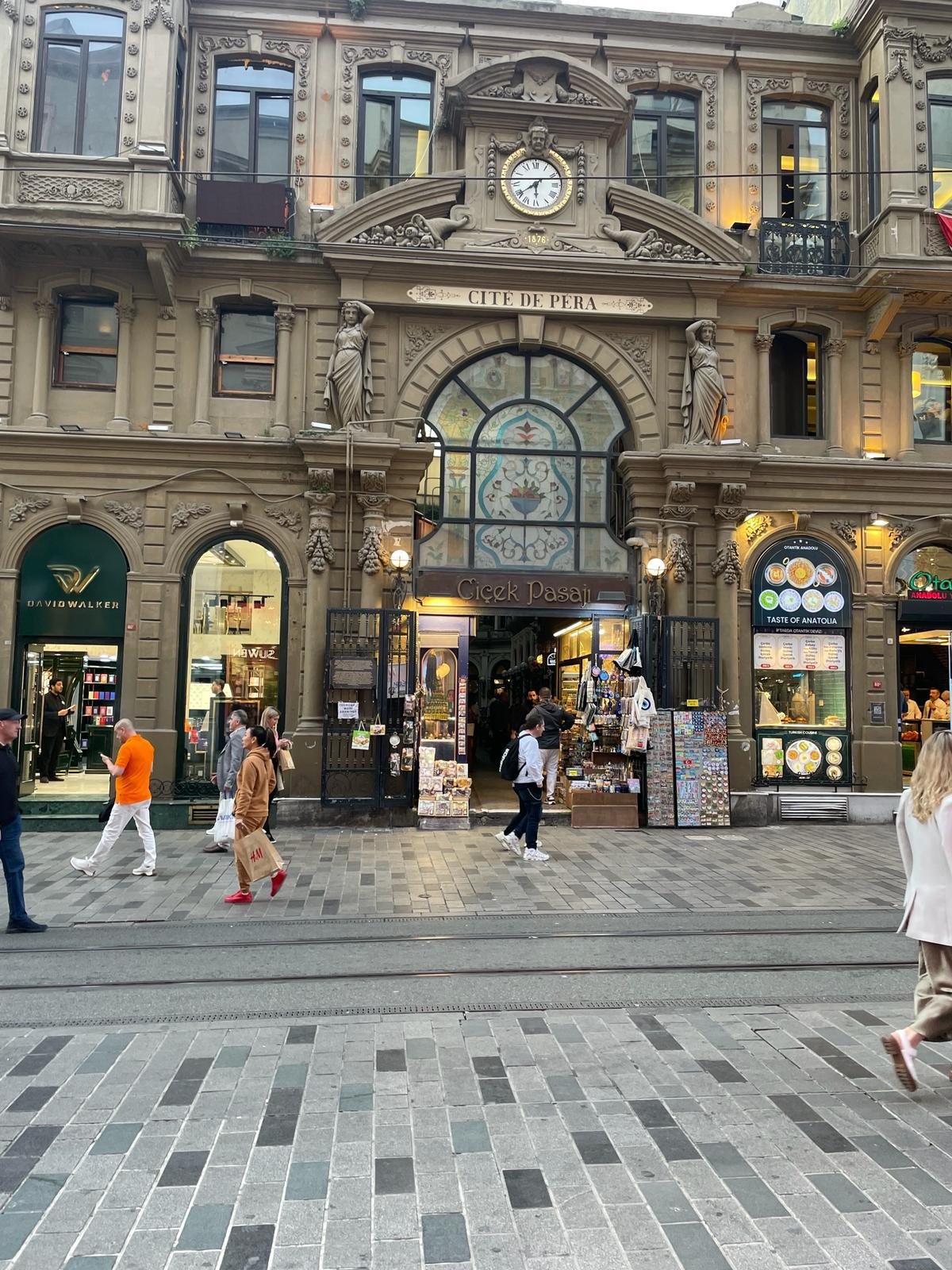
Çiçek Pasajı on İstiklal Avenue

The site of Çiçek Pasajı was originally occupied by the Naum Theatre, which was burned during the great fire of Pera in 1870. The theatre was frequently visited by Sultans Abdülaziz and Abdülhamid II, and hosted Giuseppe Verdi's play Il Trovatore before the opera houses of Paris. After the fire of 1870, the theatre was purchased by the local Greek banker Hristaki Zoğrafos Efendi, and architect Kleanthis Zannos designed the current building, which was opened in 1876 and called the Cité de Péra or Hristaki Pasajı in its early years. Yorgo'nun Meyhanesi (Yorgo's Winehouse) was the first winehouse to be opened in the passage. In 1908 the Ottoman Grand Vizier Said Pasha purchased the building, and it became known as the Said Pasha Passage. Following the Russian Revolution of 1917, many impoverished noble Russian women, including a Baroness, sold flowers here. By the 1940s the building was mostly occupied by flower shops, hence the present Turkish name Çiçek Pasajı (Flower Passage). Following the restoration of the building in 1988, it was reopened as a galleria of pubs and restaurants.

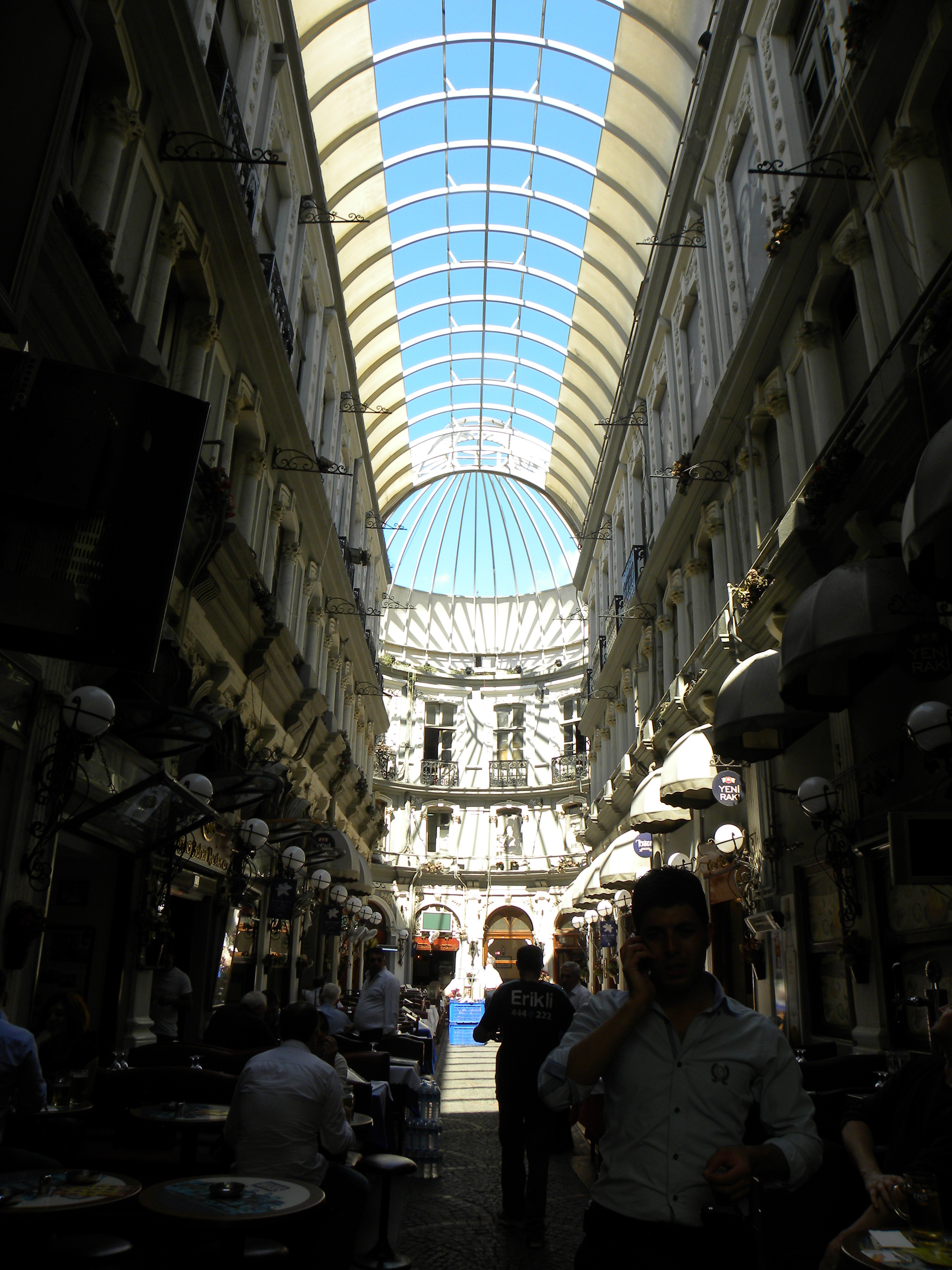
Interior view of Çiçek Pasajı, with the glass roof above the atrium and the glass cupola in the background

Pano, established by Panayotis Papadopoulos in 1898, and the neighbouring Viktor Levi, established in 1914, are among the oldest winehouses in the city and are located on Kalyoncu Kulluk Street near the British Consulate and Galatasaray Square. Cumhuriyet Meyhanesi (literally Republic Winehouse), renamed in the early 1930s but originally established in the early 1890s, is another popular historic winehouse and is located in the nearby Sahne Street, along with the Hazzopulo Winehouse, established in 1871, inside the Hazzopulo Pasajı which connects Sahne Street and Meşrutiyet Avenue. Nevizade Street, which has rows of historic pubs next to each other, is also in this area. Other historic pubs are found in the areas around Tünel Pasajı and the nearby Asmalımescit Street. Cezayir Street near Galatasaray High School, which was restored and conceptually branded as the Rue Française, has rows of francophone pubs, cafés and restaurants with live music.

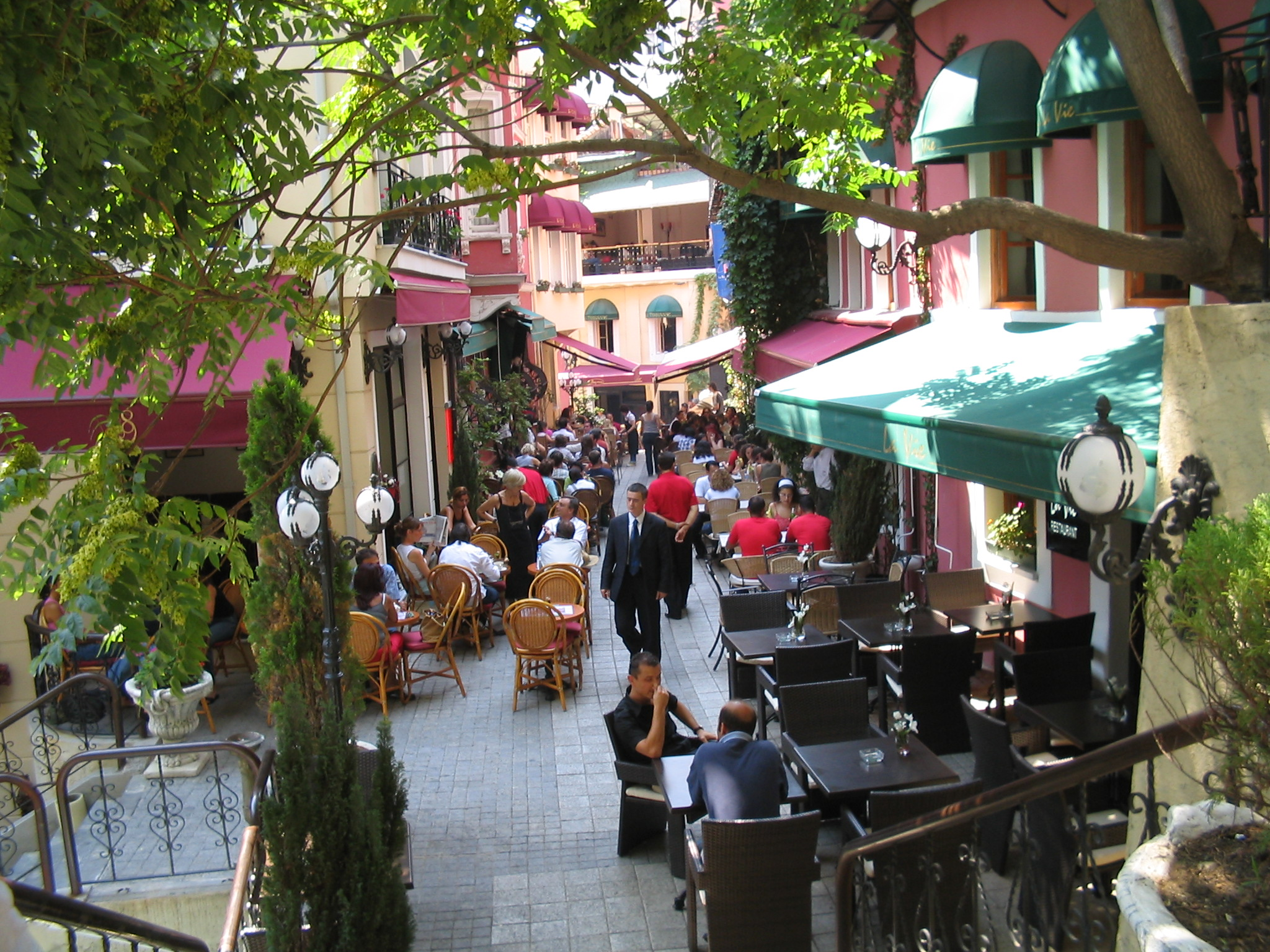
Cezayir Street, which was restored and conceptually branded as the Rue Française, is known for its pubs and restaurants with live music.

Throughout Beyoğlu, there are many night clubs for all kinds of tastes. There are restaurants on the top of historic buildings with a view of the city. Asmalımescit Street has rows of traditional Turkish restaurants and Ocakbaşı (grill) houses, while the streets around the historic Balıkpazarı (Fish Market) is full of eateries offering seafood like fried mussels and calamari along with beer or rakı, or the traditional kokoreç. Beyoğlu also has many elegant pasaj (passages) from the 19th century, most of which have historic and classy chocolateries and patisseries along with many shops lining their alleys. There is also a wide range of fast-food restaurants in the district.

Apart from the hundreds of shops lining the streets and avenues of the district, there is also a business community. Odakule, a 1970s high rise building (the first "structural expressionism" style building in Turkey) is the headquarters of İstanbul Sanayi Odası (ISO) (Istanbul Chamber of Industry) and is located between İstiklal Avenue and Tepebaşı, next to the Pera Museum. Most of the upper floors of the buildings in Beyoğlu are office space, and small workshops are found on the side streets.

=== Landmarks ===
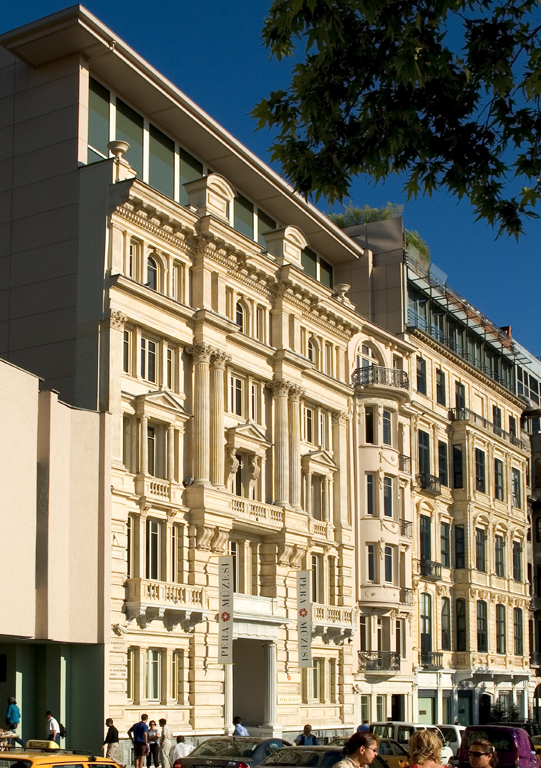
Pera Museum

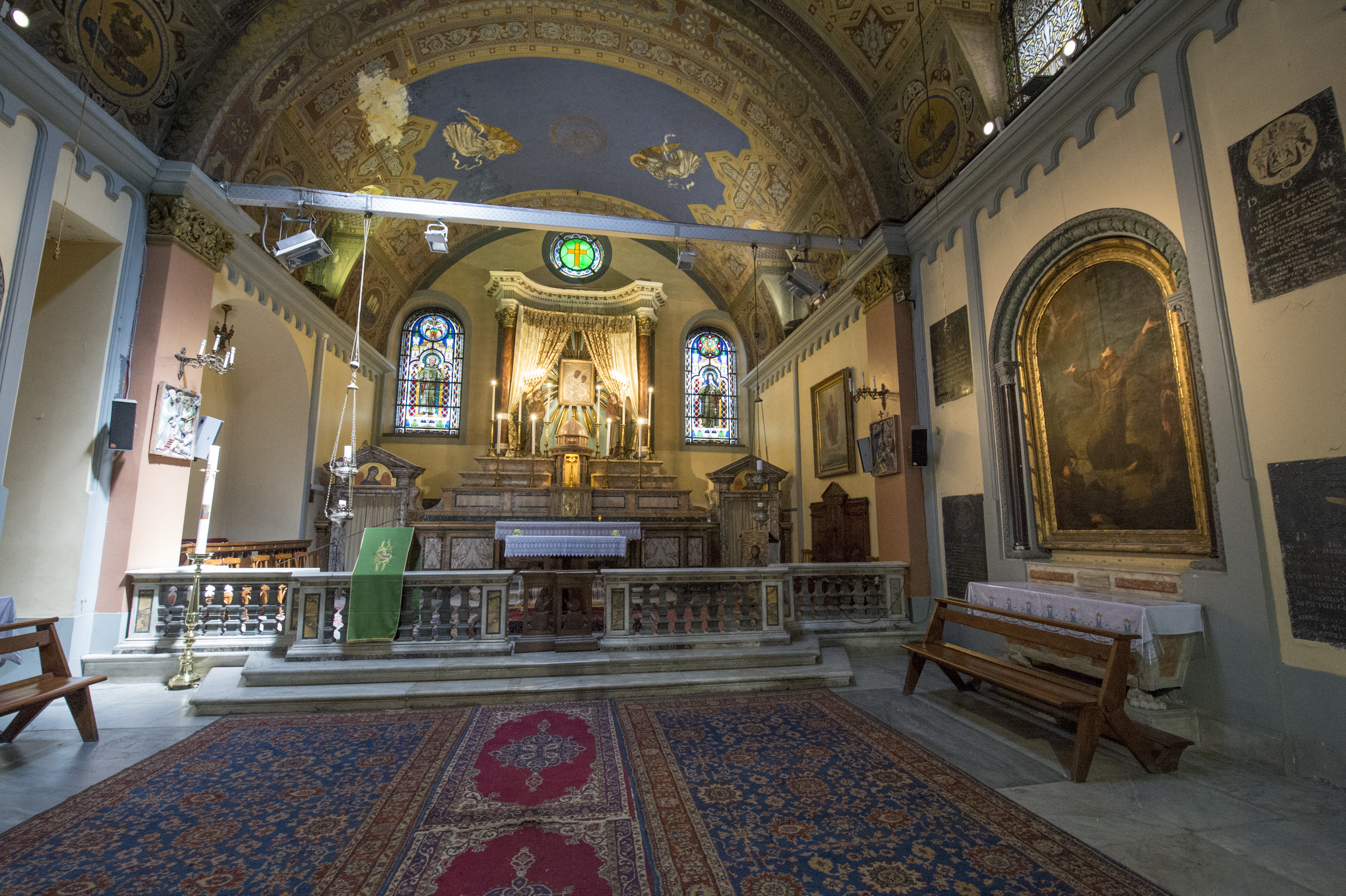
Church of Saint Mary Draperis

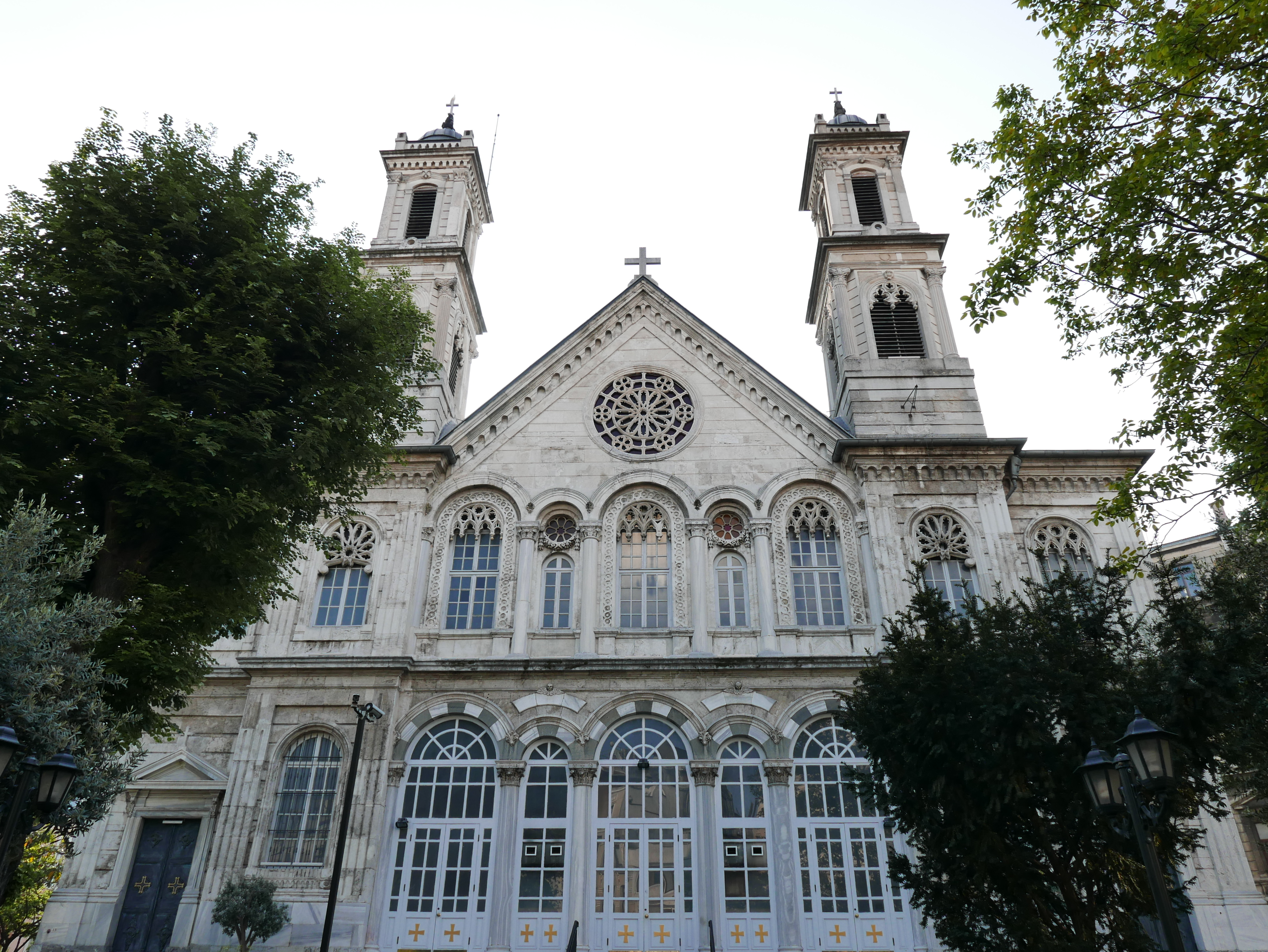
Hagia Triada Greek Orthodox Church

Istanbul Modern, located near Karaköy Port on the Bosphorus, frequently hosts the exhibitions of renowned Turkish and foreign artists.

Pera Museum exhibits some of the works of art from the late Ottoman period, such as the Kaplumbağa Terbiyecisi (Turtle Trainer) by Osman Hamdi Bey. Apart from its permanent collection, the museum also hosts visiting exhibitions, which included the works of renowned artists such as Rembrandt.

Doğançay Museum, Turkey's first contemporary art museum dedicated to the works of a single artist, officially opened its doors to the public in 2004. While the museum almost exclusively displays the works of its founder Burhan Doğançay, a contemporary artists, one floor has been set aside for the works of the artist's father, Adil Doğançay.

Hotel Pera Palace was built in the district in 1892 for hosting the passengers of the Orient Express. Agatha Christie wrote the novel Murder on the Orient Express in this hotel. Her room is conserved as a museum.

S. Antonio di Padova, the largest Catholic church in Turkey, and the Neve Shalom Synagogue, the largest synagogue in Turkey, are also in Beyoğlu. There are other important Catholic and Orthodox churches in the area, such as the Saint Mary Draperis church or centrally located Hagia Triada Church at the conjunction point between Istiklal Avenue and Taksim Square. It is the seat of the Chaldean Catholic Archeparchy of Diyarbakir.

The only Jewish Museum of Turkey, which has been converted from a synagogue, is located in the Karaköy quarter, which was known as Galata in the medieval period.

İstiklal Avenue is also located in the historic Beyoğlu (Pera) district. The famous street with shops, cafes, cinemas and other venues stretches for 1.4 kilometres (0.87 mi) and hosts up to 3 million people each day.

The 1948-opened Atlas Cinema is situated in an 1877-built historic building at Istiklal Avenue.

== Education ==
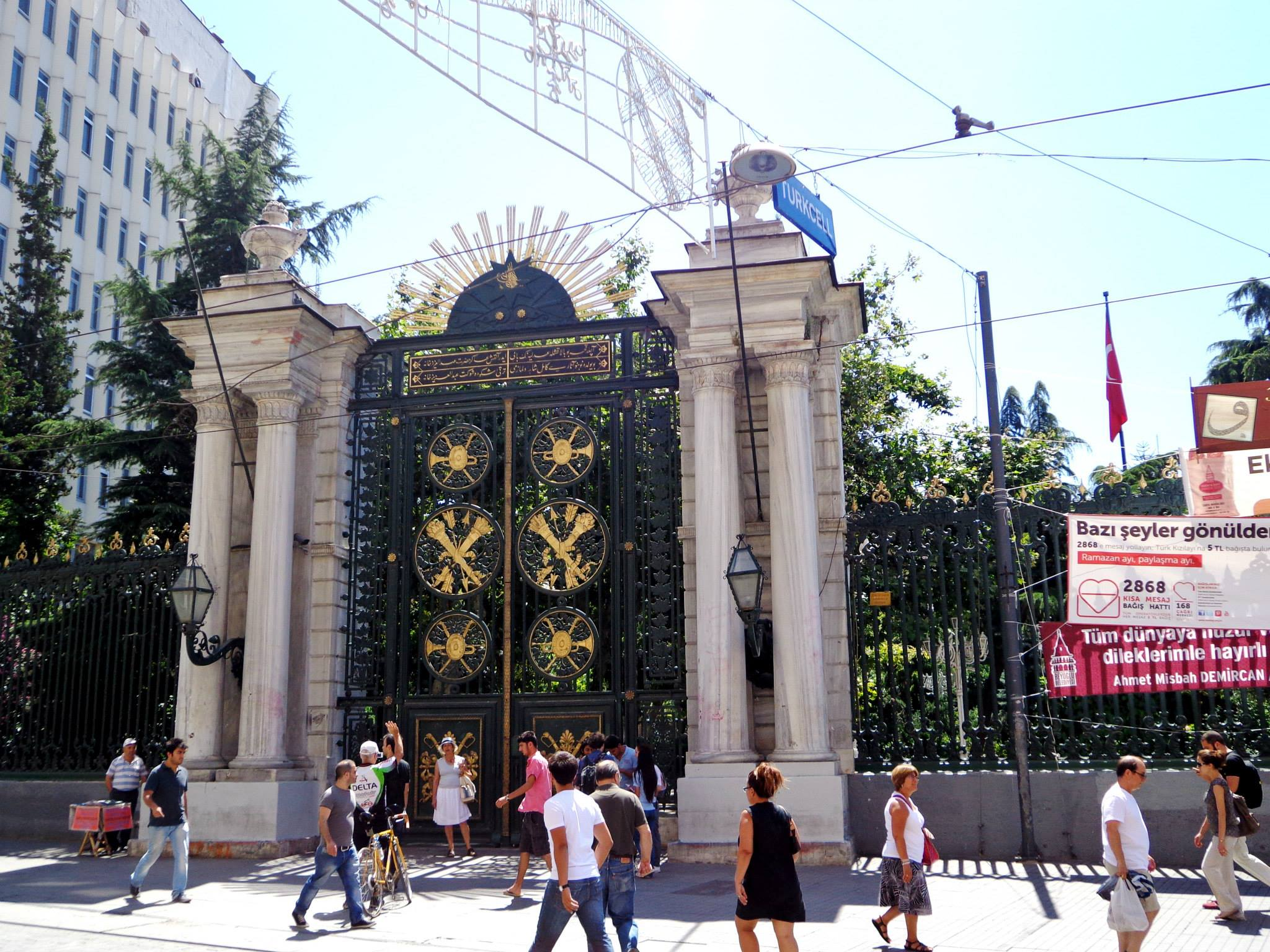
Gate of the Galatasaray High School on İstiklal Avenue

Primary and secondary schools in the district:

- Deutsche Schule Istanbul
- Galatasaray High School
- Liceo Italiano di Istanbul
- Lycée Français Pierre Loti d'Istanbul Beyoglu Campus
- St. George's Austrian High School

Universities

- Beykent University Taksim Campus
- Mimar Sinan Fine Arts University

The original campus of the Ottoman Imperial School of Medicine, established in 1827, was in Galatasaray, Pera. After a fire in 1848 it temporarily moved to the Golden Horn.

Lycée Saint-Joseph, Istanbul was in Pera after its establishment; its official founding year is 1870.

== Quarters and neighborhoods ==
Quarters within Beyoğlu

- Ayaspaşa
- Azapkapı
- Çıksalın
- Çukurcuma
- Dolapdere
- Fındıklı
- Galata
- Galatasaray
- Hacıhüsrev
- Hasköy
- Kabataş
- Karaköy
- Kasımpaşa
- Kuledibi
- Şişhane
- Taksim
- Talimhane
- Tarlabaşı
- Tepebaşı
- Tophane
- Tünel

There are 45 neighbourhoods in Beyoğlu District:

- Asmalı Mescit
- Azapkapı
- Bedrettin
- Bereketzade
- Bostan
- Bülbül
- Camiikebir
- Çatma Mescit
- Cihangir
- Çukur
- Emekyemez
- Evliya Çelebi
- Fetihtepe
- Firüzağa
- Gümüşsuyu
- Hacıahmet
- Hacımimi
- Halıcıoğlu
- Hüseyinağa
- İstiklal
- Kadımehmet Efendi
- Kalyoncukulluk
- Kamerhatun
- Kaptanpaşa
- Katipmustafa Çelebi
- Keçeçipiri
- Kemankeş Karamustafapaşa
- Kılıçali Paşa
- Kocatepe
- Küçük Piyale
- Kulaksız
- Kuloğlu
- Müeyyetzade
- Ömer Avni
- Örnektepe
- Piri Mehmet Paşa
- Piyalepaşa
- Pürtelaş Hasan Efendi
- Şahkulu
- Şehit Muhtar
- Sururi
- Sütlüce
- Tomtom
- Yahya Kahya
- Yenişehir

== International relations ==
In the Ottoman period the embassy of the United States to the Ottoman Empire was located in Pera.

=== Twin towns – sister cities ===
Beyoğlu is twinned with:

- Benalmádena, Spain
- Bunkyō (Tokyo), Japan
- Centar (Skopje), North Macedonia
- Chengdu, China
- Chornomorsk, Ukraine
- Dubrovnik, Croatia
- Genoa, Italy
- Hebron, Palestine
- Mitte (Berlin), Germany
- Novi Grad (Sarajevo), Bosnia and Herzegovina
- Schaerbeek, Belgium
- Sector 1 (Bucharest), Romania
- Seongbuk (Seoul), South Korea
- Sidi Bernoussi (Casablanca), Morocco
- Tozeur, Tunisia
- Vitacura, Chile

=== Friendly cities ===
- Catania, Italy
- Pécs, Hungary
- Dortmund, Germany
- Mannheim, Germany

== See also ==
- List of restaurant districts and streets
