= Avrupa Pasajı =

Coordinates: 41°02′02″N 28°58′38″E

- Location: İstanbul Beyoğlu, Turkey

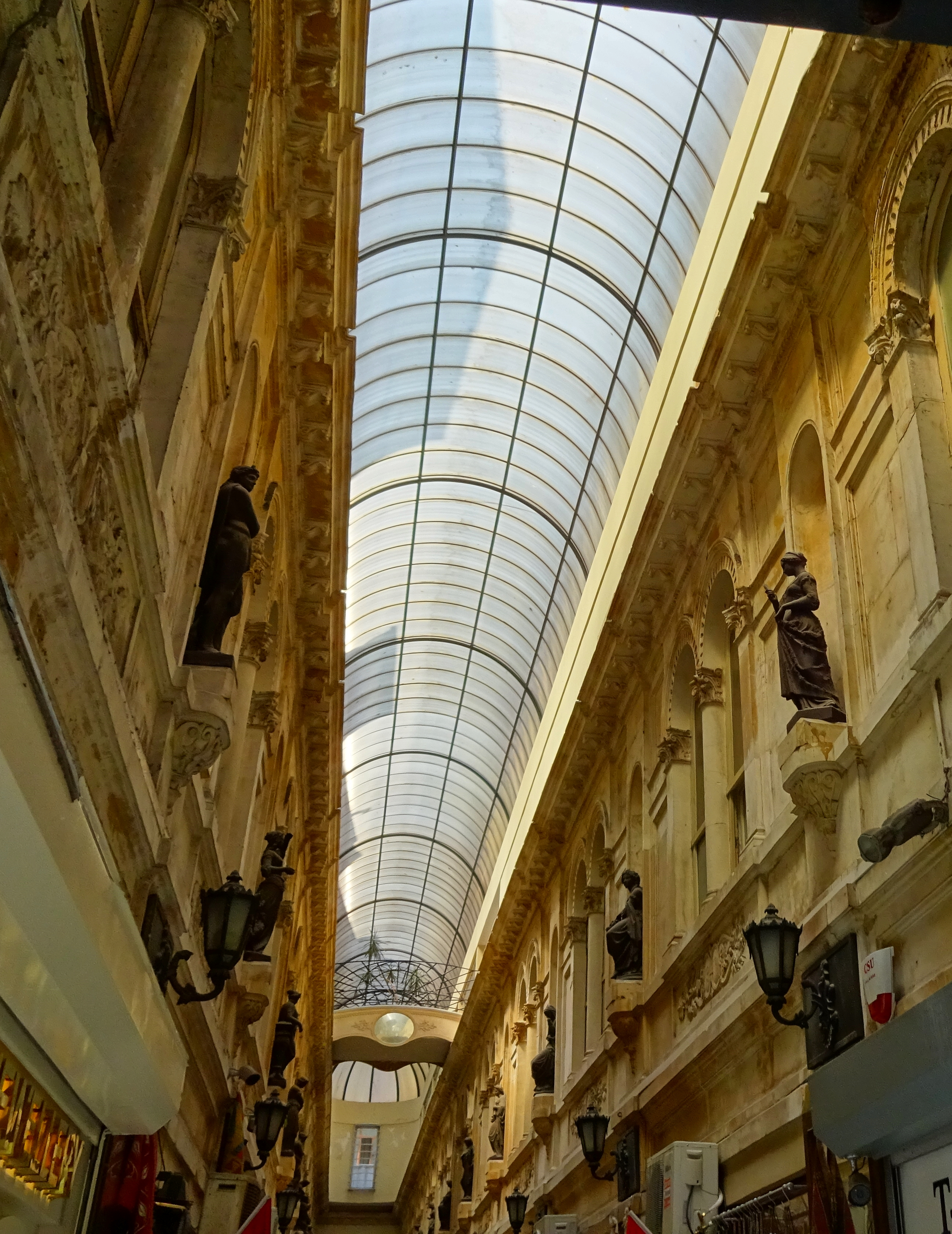
Statues and glass ceiling of Avrupa Pasajı

Avrupa Pasajı (European Arcade in Turkish) or Passage d'Europe is a historical shopping arcade that connects Meşrutiyet Caddesi and Sahne Sokak in İstanbul's Beyoğlu district. The building is located in Hüseyinağa subdistrict and is close to Galatasaray High School and Beyoğlu Fish Market. It is also called Aynalı Pasaj (Arcade with Mirrors).

== History ==
The Naum Theater and the Jardin des Fleurs Hotel were previously located at the modern site of Avrupa Pasajı, but these buildings were burned along with many others during the Great Beyoğlu Fire of 5 June 1870. After the fire, architect Pulgher developed a neoclassical shopping arcade project for the cleared area and this project was built by the Ottoman Armenian merchant Onnik Düz in 1874.

Initially the arcade was illuminated by gas lamps placed in front of its famous mirrors, giving rise to its other name "Aynalı Pasaj". In the early years shops in the arcade included a shoemaker, two hairdressers, two tailors, a grocery store, a haberdasher, two soap-makers and a carpet seller. In the following years, businesses such as florists, watchmakers, piano manufacturers and fashion houses were also established in the building.

Today, businesses in the mall are dominated by souvenir, antique, clothing and jewelry stores selling items such as postcards, china and carpets.

== Architecture ==
56 meter long, 3 stories high shopping arcade was built in a neoclassical fashion and contains 22 stores. Fire resistant Maltese limestone was used as a building material during construction. Each store has its own staff room, kitchen and basement. Avrupa Pasajı also contains large female statues on its upper inner façade, each one representing a different craft. The ceiling of the passage is partially covered with windows. The building has chandeliers hanging from its ceiling, which can be used as a light source. Arches are located between each shop.

== Gallery ==
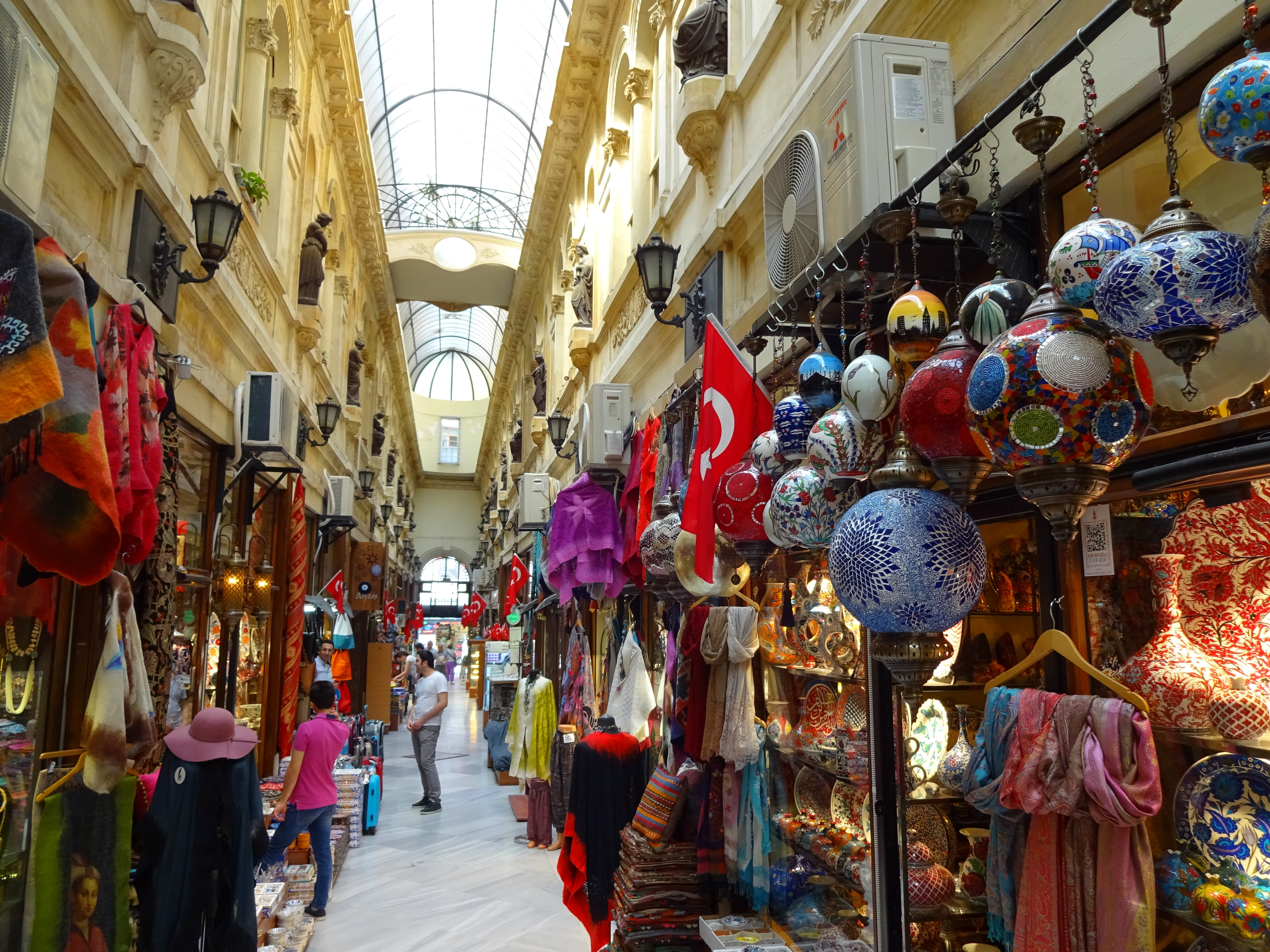
Interior

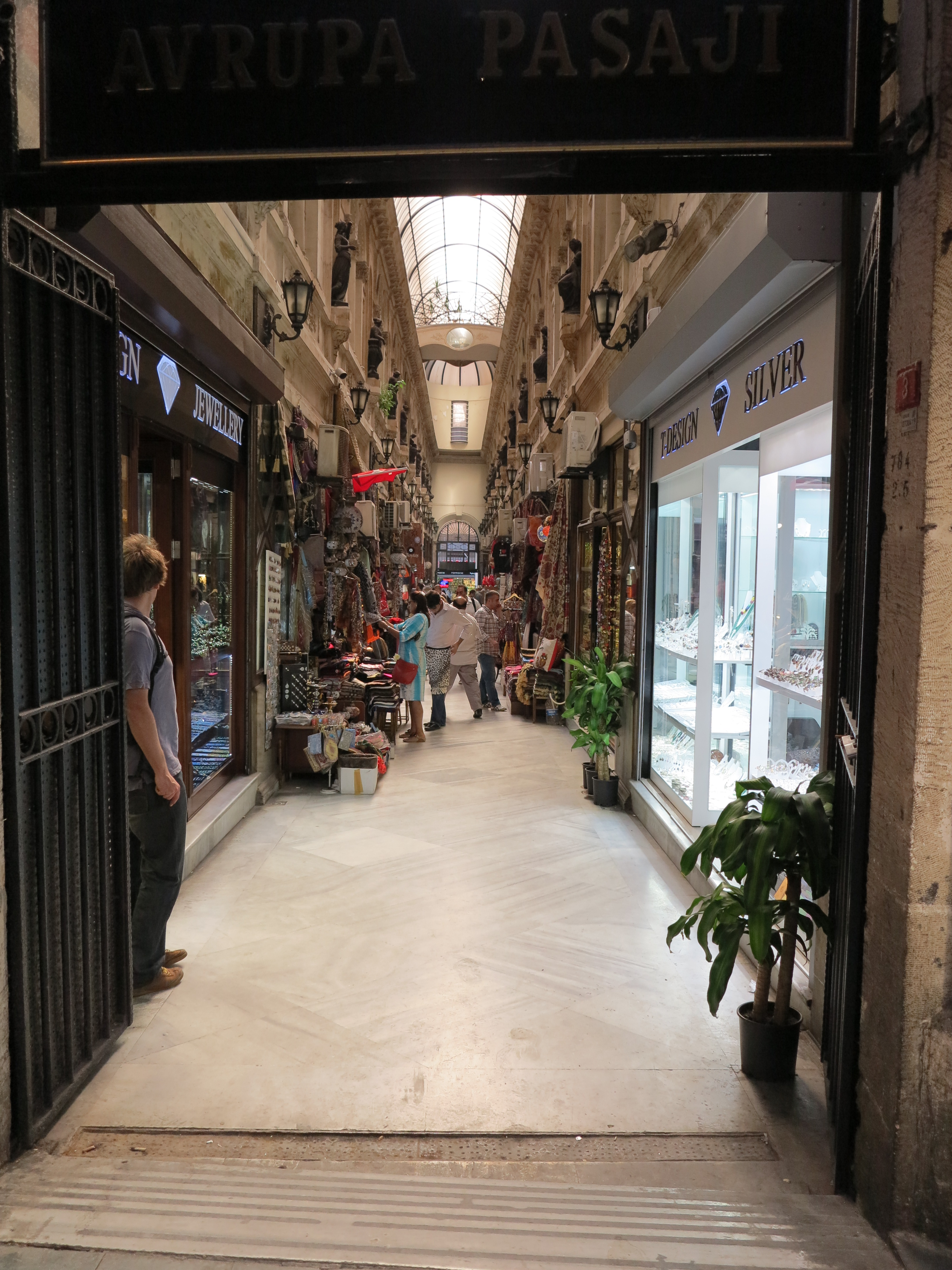
Entrance door
