= Kuledibi =

Quarter of Istanbul, Turkey

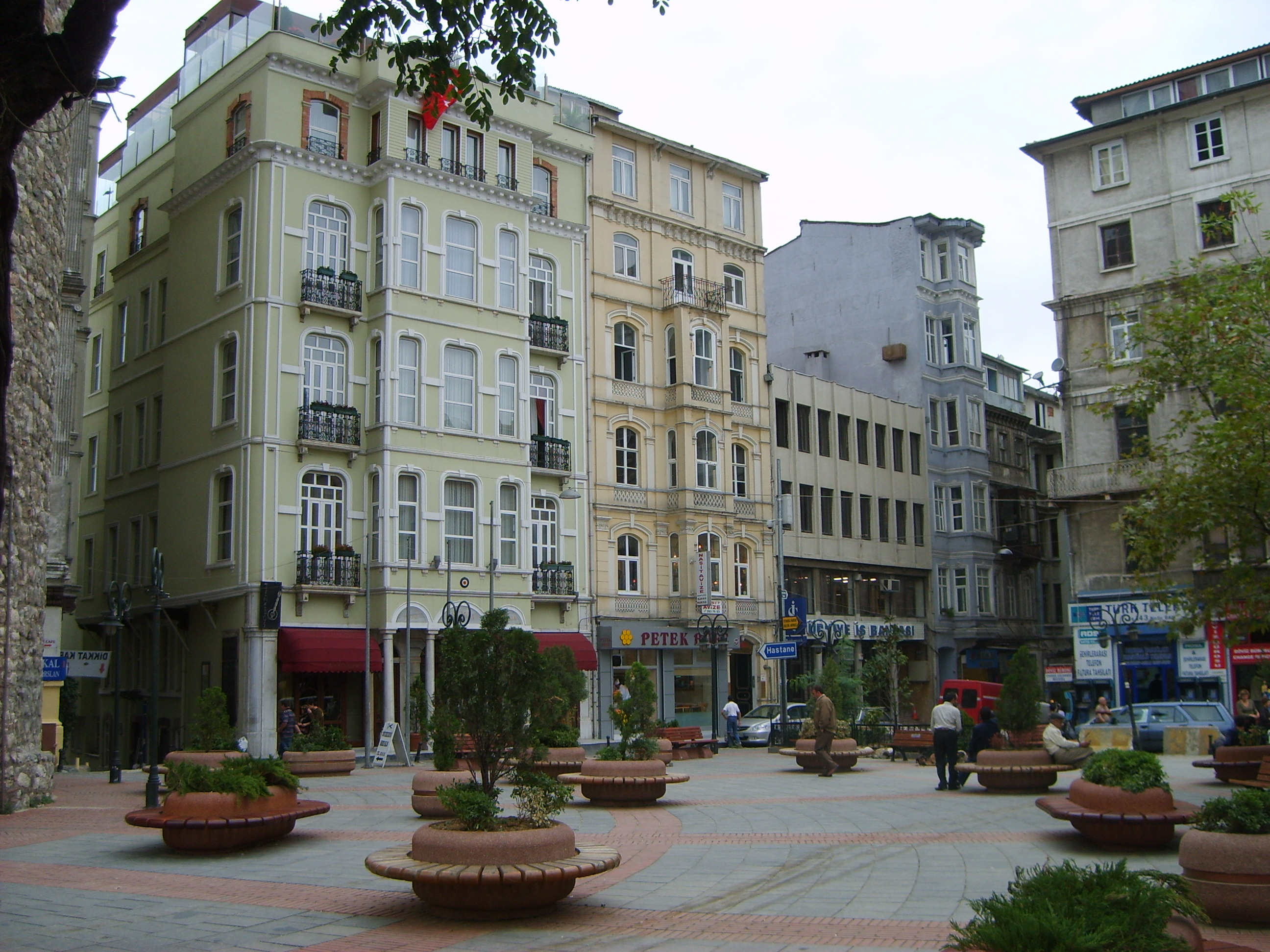
Area directly under Galata Tower

Kuledibi ("foot of the tower" in Turkish) is a quarter of İstanbul's Beyoğlu district. The term is generally used to describe the surrounding areas around the Galata Tower. The region extends to the streets parallel to Voyvoda Street in the south, Okçu Musa Street in the west (forming the upper part of Bankalar Caddesi), Yüksek Kaldırım Street in the east, Tımarcı Street and Şahkulu Street in the north.

Palazzo del Comune (Ceneviz Sarayı), which was built in 1316 and served as the administrative center of the Genoese colony in İstanbul is one of the main buildings in Kuledibi quarter. Sankt Georg Church, Hospital and School (Avusturya Lisesi), Church of SS Peter and Paul, Şehsuvar Bey Masjid and Beyoğlu Göz Eğitim ve Araştırma Hastanesi are other major structures around Galata Tower. Architecture of Kuledibi, especially buildings that was constructed before 20th century, exhibits varying degrees of influence from Italian Levantines that were living in İstanbul at the time.

Kuledibi, which was called La Kula ("The Tower") by Judeo-Spanish speakers, had a dense Jewish population until the 1950s. Neve Shalom Synagogue and Terziler Synagogue are the two temples that still serve the İstanbul's Jewish community. The Camondo Stairs, a pedestrian stairway designed with a unique mix of the Neo-Baroque and early Art Nouveau styles was also built by Ottoman-Venetian Jewish banker Abraham Salomon Camondo.

== See also ==
- Galata
- Genoese colonies
