= Kulaksız, Beyoğlu =

Neighborhood in Beyoğlu district, Istanbul, Turkey

Kulaksız is a neighborhood (mahalle) in the Beyoğlu District of Istanbul, Turkey. Its population is 9,706 (2019). Much of the neighborhood's land is taken up by the large Kulaksız and Zindan Arkası Cemeteries and the smaller Eminefendi Cemetery.

The neighborhood is bordered on the north by the Keçeci Piri neighborhood, on the east by the Kaptanpaşa and Küçük Piyale neighborhoods, on the south by the Kadı Mehmet and Camiikebir neighborhoods, and on the west by the Camiikebir and Keçeci Piri neighborhoods.

== Name ==
The neighborhood's name means literally "earless" (Turkish: kulak + -siz).

According to one report, Kulaksız is a corruption of Kul haksız (literally, "The slave (of the sultan) is unjust"). Hüseyin Ayvansarayî wrote that once when Mehmed II was in Okmeydanı, his soldiers went looking for water. In the neighborhood now known as Kulaksız, they got into a conflict with the local people, who nevertheless told them of a water source under a mosque now known as İbâdullah where the soldiers were able to fill their water vessels. Then it was said that "the slave is unjust."

== Notable features ==
- Kulaksız Cemetery
- Zindan Arkası Cemetery
- Haşimi Emir Osman Mosque, apparently built as a zâviye (Sufi lodge), later turned into a mosque
- Tomb of Haşimi Emir Osman, sheikh of the Bayrami order and poet (1513–1595)
- Eminefendi Cemetery
- Seferikoz Mosque
- Seyit Ali Mosque
