= List of libraries in Ankara =

This is a list of libraries in Ankara. The list is divided according to the type libraries.

== National libraries ==
- Presidential Library
- National Library

== Academic libraries ==
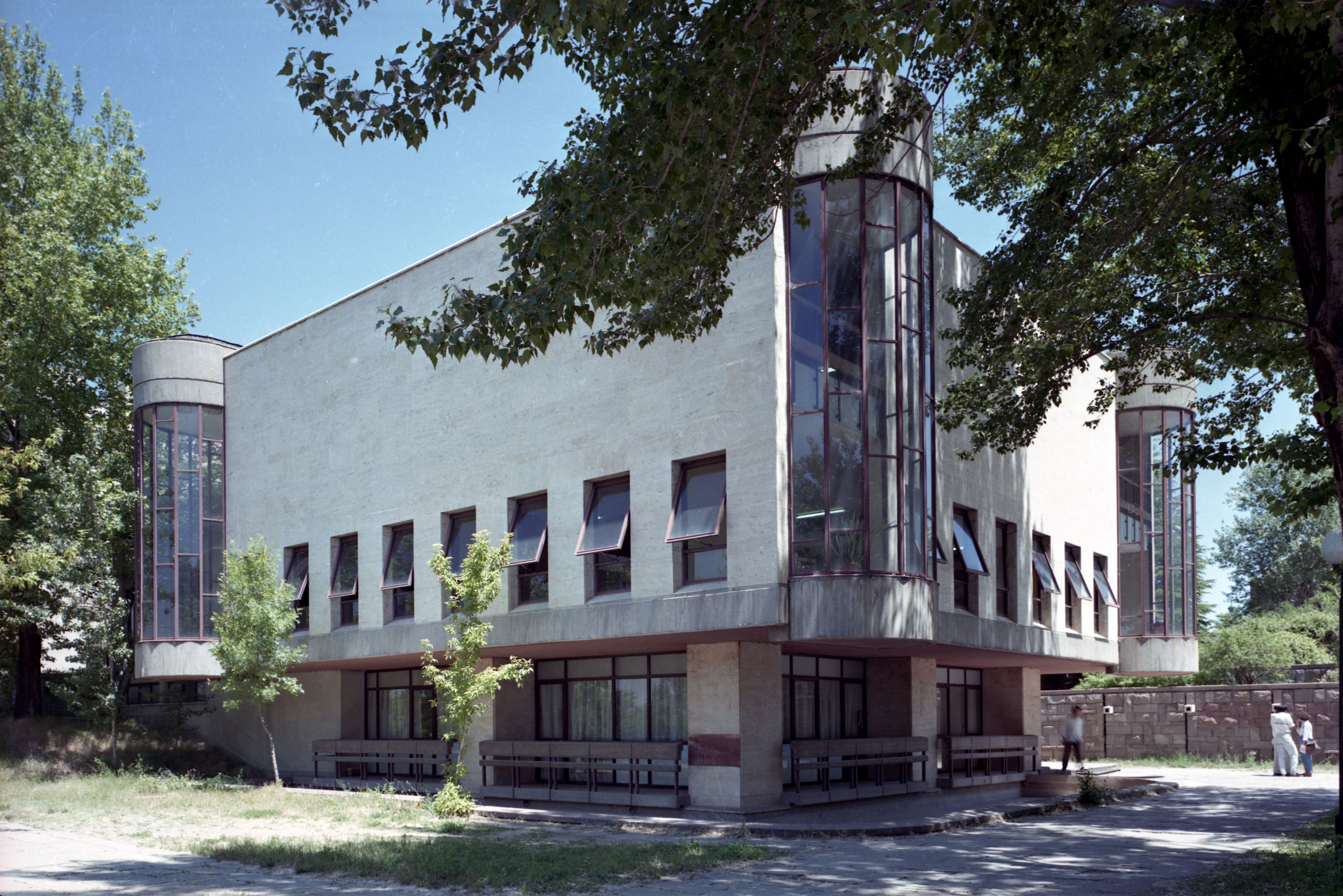
METU Library

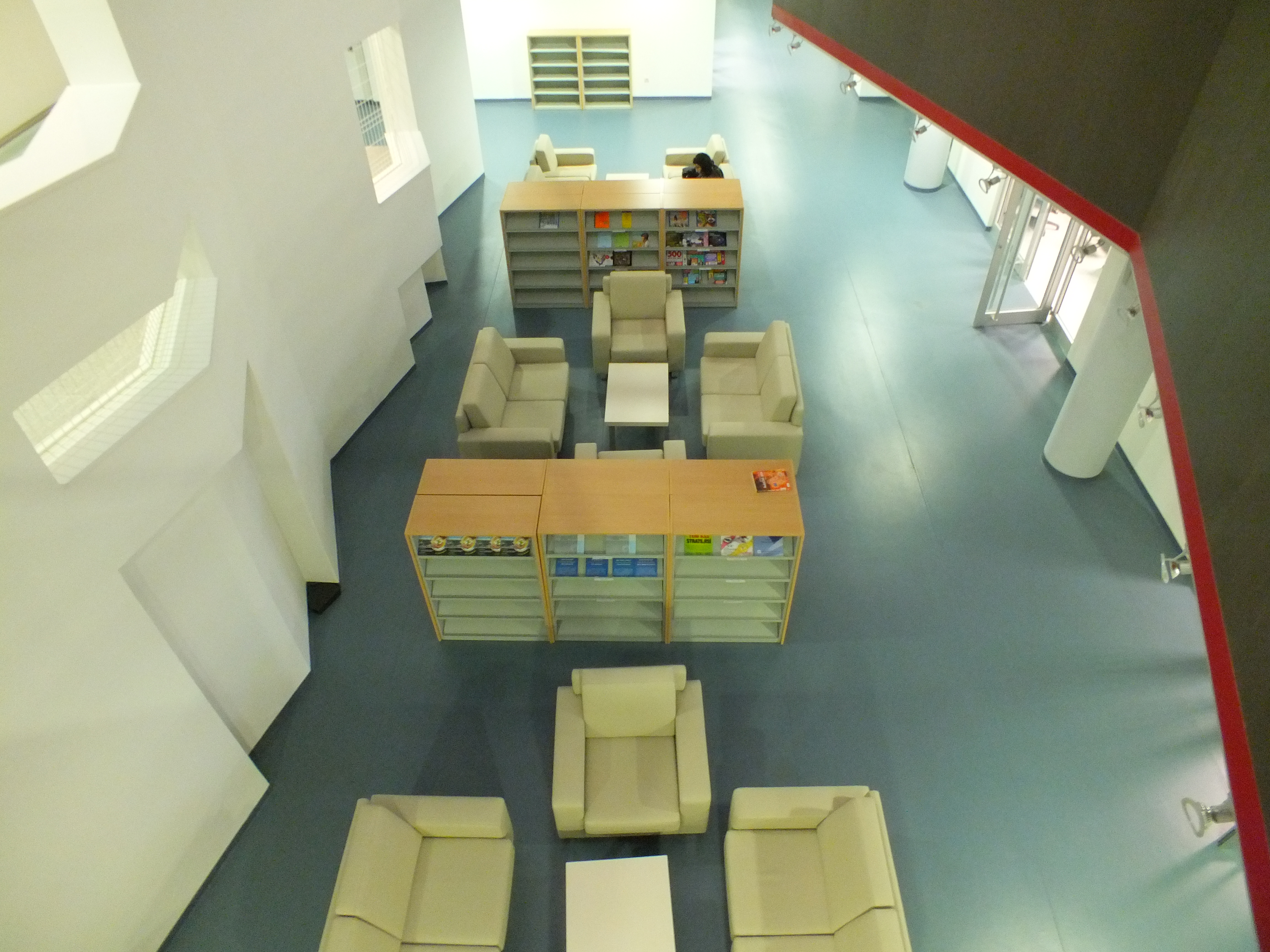
Çankaya University Library

Opening date	Name	Place
	Atılım University Kadriye Zaim University Library	Gölbaşı
	Başkent University Library	Çankaya
	Bilkent University Library	Çankaya
	Çankaya University Library	Çankaya
	Water and Water Law Research Center	
	University Central Campus Library	
	GATE Library and Documentation Centre	
	METU Library	Çankaya
	Hacettepe University Library Beytepe	
	Hacettepe University Medical School Library	
	Ted Ayse Ilıcak'ın University Library	

== Public libraries ==
- Adnan Ötüken City Public Library
- Abdurrrahman Oğultürk Public Library
- Akyurt County Public Library.
- Ankara Ali Dayi Children's Library
- Ankara Kalecik County Public Library
- Ankara Public Library OR-The Year of Love
- Ayas County Public Library
- Bala County Public Library
- Balgat Hussein Alpine Public Library
- Beypazarı Mehmet Akif Ersoy County Public Library
- Cebeci Public Library
- Cer Modern Art Library
- Çamlıdere County Public Library
- Çubuk County Public Library
- Elmadağ County Public Library
- Universe County Public Library
- Fatih Library
- Göklerkö Public Library
- Gölbaşı County Public Library
- Gudul County Public Library
- Hasanoğlan April 17 Public Library
- Haymana County Public Library
- Karas Public Library
- Boiler County Public Library
- Kecioren Aktepe Public Library
- Kecioren Fatih Public Library
- Kesikköprü Public Library
- Kızılcahamam County Public Library
- Kutludüğün Public Library
- Mamak County Public Library
- Mehmet Akif Ersoy Literature Museum Library
- National Library
- Nallıhan County Public Library
- Oyaca Public Library
- Polatli County Public Library
- Pursaklar House Public Library
- Sinanlı Public Library
- Sincan County Public Library
- Sincan Yenikent Public Library
- Şentepe Public Library
- Şereflikoçhisar Yunus Emre County Public Library
- Şuayip Çalkan Public Library
- Yenimahalle District Public Library
- Yunus Emre (Esentepe) Public Library

== Municipal libraries ==
- Ankara Metropolitan Municipality District Library

== See also ==
- List of libraries in Turkey
