= List of libraries in Turkey =

The following is a list of libraries in Turkey. According to the Ministry of Culture and Tourism, there are 1,257 libraries as of 30 December 2022 in the country. The total seating capacity is 114,906 in a total indoor usage are of 399,732 m^{2} (4,302,680 sq ft). In January 2023, Istanbul's largest library, the Rami Library, opened, having 4,200 seating capacity in 36,257 m^{2} (390,270 sq ft) covered area.

== Libraries by province ==
=== Ankara ===
==== National libraries ====
- Presidential Library
- National Library

==== Academic libraries ====
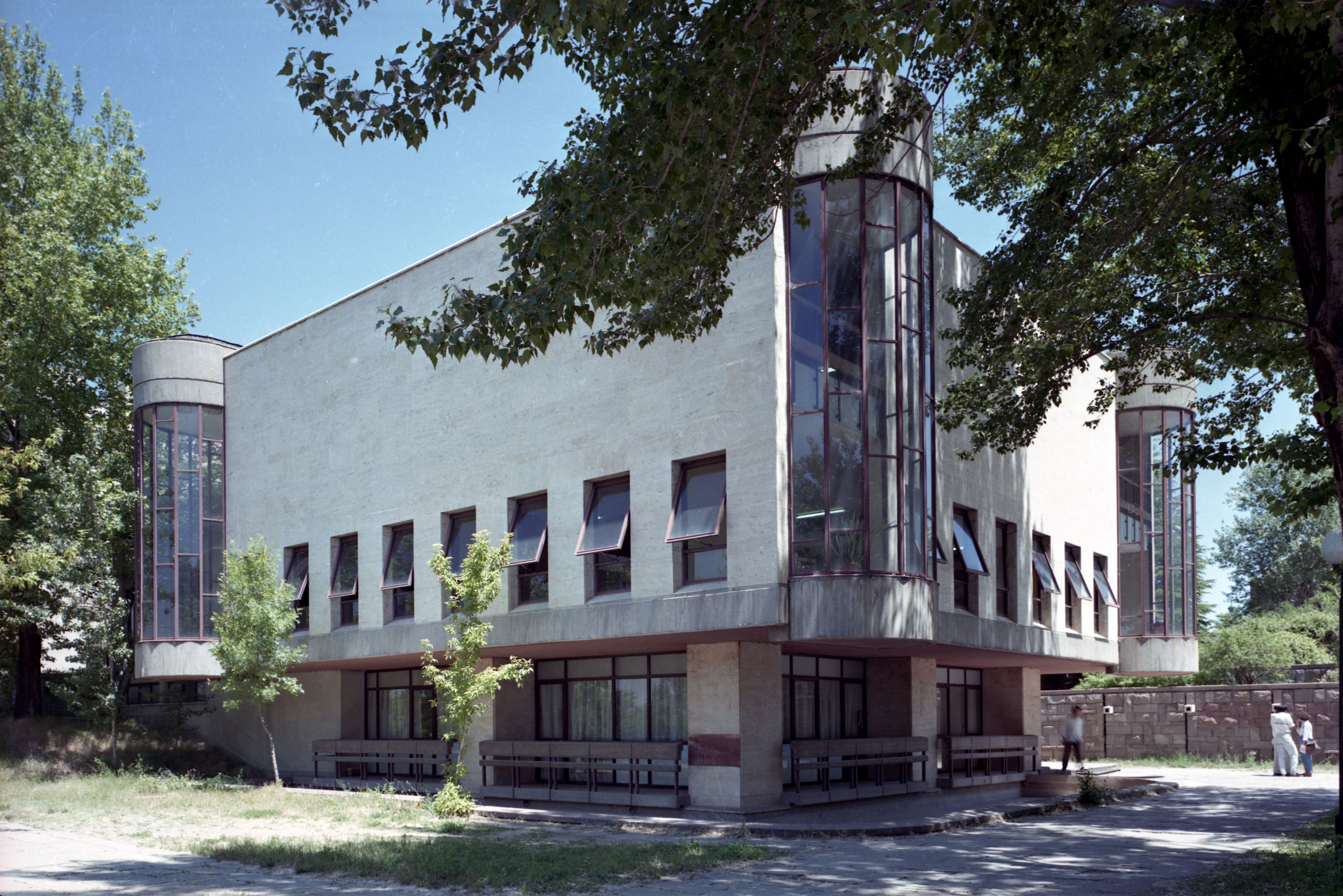
METU Library

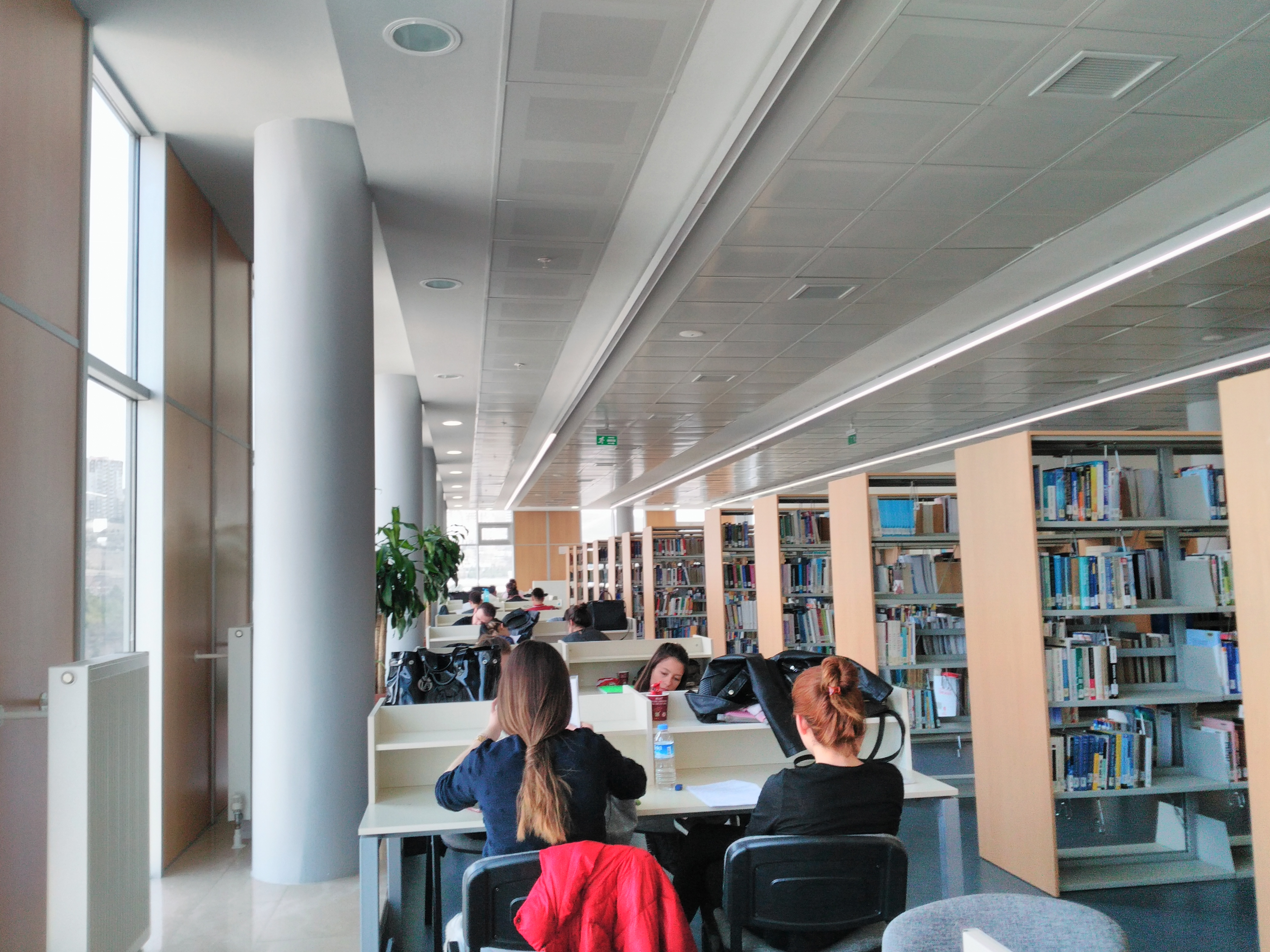
Çankaya University Library

Opening date	Name	Place
	Atılım University Kadriye Zaim University Library	Gölbaşı
	Başkent University Library	Çankaya
	Bilkent University Library	Çankaya
	Çankaya University Library	Çankaya
	Water and Water Law Research Center	
	University Central Campus Library	
	GATE Library and Documentation Centre	
	METU Library	Çankaya
	Hacettepe University Library Beytepe	
	Hacettepe University Health Sciences Library	
	Ted Ayse Ilıcak'ın University Library	
	Muğla Sıtkı Koçman Üniversitesi Menteşe Kütüphanesi	Muğla

==== Public libraries ====
- Adnan Ötüken City Public Library
- Abdurrrahman Oğultürk Public Library
- Ankara Metropolitan Municipality District Library
- Ankara Ali Dayi Children's Library
- Ankara Public Library
- Balgat Hussein Alpine Public Library
- Cebeci Public Library
- Cer Modern Art Library
- Fatih Library
- Göklerkö Public Library
- Hasanoğlan April 17 Public Library
- Karas Public Library
- Kecioren Aktepe Public Library
- Kecioren Fatih Public Library
- Kesikköprü Public Library
- Kutludüğün Public Library
- Mamak County Public Library
- Mehmet Akif Ersoy Literature Museum Library
- Oyaca Public Library
- Pursaklar House Public Library
- Sinanlı Public Library
- Sincan Yenikent Public Library
- Şentepe Public Library
- Şuayip Çalkan Public Library
- Yenimahalle District Public Library
- Yunus Emre (Esentepe) Public Library

==== County Public libraries ====
- Akyurt County Public Library
- Şereflikoçhisar Yunus Emre County Public Library
- Sincan County Public Library
- Polatli County Public Library
- Nallıhan County Public Library
- Kızılcahamam County Public Library
- Boiler County Public Library
- Haymana County Public Library
- Gölbaşı County Public Library
- Gudul County Public Library
- Çamlıdere County Public Library
- Çubuk County Public Library
- Elmadağ County Public Library
- Universe County Public Library
- Ankara Kalecik County Public Library
- Ayas County Public Library
- Bala County Public Library
- Beypazarı Mehmet Akif Ersoy County Public Library

=== Artvin ===
- Atça District Public Library
- Aydın Province Public Library ~60.000 books
- Aydın Kids and Youth Library
- Bozdoğan District Public Library
- Çine District Public Library
- Germencik District Public Library
- Ortaklar District Public Library
- İncirliova District Public Library
- Karacasu District Public Library
- Koçarlı District Public Library
- Kuşadası District Public Library
- Kuyucak District Public Library
- Nazilli District Public Library
- Söke Hacı Halilpaşa District Public Library
- Sarıkemer District Public Library
- Sultanhisar District Public Library
- Yenipazar District Public Library

=== Bursa ===
- Bursa Inebey Manuscripts
- Nilüfer Akkılıç Library

==== Municipality libraries ====
- Nilüfer Children's Library
- Nilüfer Üçevler Library
- Nilüfer Library of Poetry

=== Çanakkale ===
- ÇOMÜ Library
- Tahtakuşlar Ethnography Museum Library

=== Çankırı ===
- Ankara University Çankırı Forestry Faculty Library
- Çankırı Provincial Public Library

==== County Public Libraries ====
- Atkaracalar Oğuz County Public Library
- Bayramören County Public Library
- Çerkeş County Public Library
- Eldivan County Public Library
- Ilgaz County Public Library
- Kızılırmak County Public Library
- Korgun 125. Yıl County Public Library
- Kurşunlu County Public Library
- Orta County Public Library
- Şabanözü County Public Library
- Yapraklı County Public Library

=== Denizli ===
- Pamukkale University Library
- Denizli Provincial Public Library
- Denizli Uçancıbaşı Public Library
- Denizli Bahçelievler Public Library
- Denizli Uzunpınar Public Library
- Acıpayam County Public Library
- Acıpayam Dedebağ Public Library
- Acıpayam Kelekçi Public Library
- Acıpayam Yeşilyuva Public Library
- Akköy Şehit Veli Öztürk County Public Library
- Babadağ County Public Library
- Baklan County Public Library
- Bekilli County Public Library
- Beyağaç County Public Library
- Bozkurt County Public Library
- Buldan Ali Haydar Akın County Public Library
- Buldan Yenicekent Public Library
- Çal County Public Library
- Çal Akkent Public Library
- Çardak County Public Library
- 75th Anniversary Çivril County Public Library
- Güney County Public Library
- Honaz County Public Library
- Honaz Kaklık Public Library
- Kale County Public Library
- Sarayköy County Public Library
- Serinhisar 100th Anniversary County Public Library
- Tavas County Public Library
- Tavas Kızılca Public Library
- Tavas Kızılcabölük Public Library
- Tavas Konak Public Library
- Tavas Pınarlar Public Library

=== Diyarbakır ===
- Ahmet Arif Literature Museum Library

=== Elazığ ===
- Elazığ Provincial Public Library

=== Eskişehir ===
- Library of the Chamber of Mechanical Engineers Eskişehir Branch
- Eskişehir Chamber of Industry Library
- Eskişehir Chamber of Commerce Library
- Eskişehir Provincial Public Library
- Osmangazi Public and Children's Library
- Dumlupınar Children's Library
- Atatürk Children's Library

==== University Libraries ====
- Anadolu University Central Library
- Osmangazi University Central Library

==== Municipal Libraries ====
- Tepebaşı Municipality Atatürk Children's Library
- Tepebaşı Municipality Muzaffer Tokay Children's Library
- Odunpazarı Municipality Yenikent Library

==== County Public Libraries ====
- Alpu County Public Library
- Beylikova County Public Library
- Çifteler County Public Library
- İnönü County Public Library
- Mahmudiye County Public Library
- Mihalıççık County Public Library
- Seyitgazi County Public Library
- Sivrihisar County Public Library

=== Istanbul ===
- Ahmet Hamdi Tanpınar Literature Museum Library
- Ottoman Bank Archives and Research Centre
- SALT
- Press Media Museum
- Women's Library and Information Centre Foundation
- American Library, Tepebaşı
- Atatürk Library, Taksim
- Beyazıt State Library, Beyazıt
- Halide Edip Adıvar Library (Üsküdar American Academy), Bağlarbaşı
- Istanbul Celik Gulersoy Library, Sultanahmet
- Istanbul Technical University Mustafa Inan Library
- Köprülü Library
- Library of the Archaeological Museum, Sultanahmet
- Library of the French Institute, Beyoğlu
- Library of the Goethe Institute, Beyoğlu
- Library of the Islamic Research Center, ISAM (İslam Araştırmaları Merkezi), at Mayıs Üniversitesi in Bağlarbaşı
- Manuscripts Library of the Topkapı Palace, Sultanahmet
- Library of Women's Works, Haliç
- Süleymaniye Library, Beyazıt

=== Izmir ===
- Izmir National Library
- Library of Izmir French Cultural Center
- Urla County Public Library

=== Kayseri ===
- Kayseri 75th Anniversary Provincial Public Library
- Town of Ağırnas Sinan the Architect Public Library
- Erkiletli Mehmet Paşa Public Library
- Town of Hisarcık Public Library
- Merkez Hikmet Taş Public Library
- Sinan the Architect Seljuk Public Library
- Necmettin Feyzioğlu Public Library
- Raşid Efendi Library of Ancient Artifacts
- Bünyan-Karadayı Village Public Library
- Pınarbaşı-Pazarören Public Library
- Sarıoğlan 80th Anniversary Public Library
- Kayseri Himmetdede Municipality Public Library
- The Qadi Mahmut Waqf Library
- İhsan Sarıkaya Library of Popular Sciences

==== Erciyes University Libraries ====
- Erciyes University Library of Divinity School
- Erciyes University Library of Economical and Administrative Sciences
- Erciyes University Medical School Library

==== County Public Libraries ====
- Bünyan County Public Library
- Develi Seyrani County Public Library
- Felahiye County Public Library
- Hacılar County Public Library
- İncesu County Public Library
- Özvatan County Public Library
- Pınarbaşı County Public Library
- Sarız County Public Library
- Talas Fatma-Kemal Timuçin County Public Library
- Tomarza County Public Library
- Yahyalı County Public Library
- Yeşilhisar County Public Library

=== Konya ===
- Selçuk University Central Library

=== Kütahya ===
- Dumlupınar University Central Library

=== Muğla ===
- Hoca Mustafa Efendi Provincial Public Library
- Şehbal Hilmi Baydur Children's Library

=== Nevşehir ===
- Tahsin Ağa Library

=== Rize ===
- Rize Provincial Public Library
- Taşköprü Public Library
- Veliköy Public Library
- Madenli Public Library
- Güneyce Public Library
- İsmail Kahraman Cultural Center Public Library

==== University Libraries ====
- RTEU Central Library
- RTEU Divinity School Library
- RTEU Educational School Library
- RTEU Medical School Library
- RTEU Ardeşen Professional School Library
- RTEU Turgut Kıran Maritime Boarding School Library

==== County Public Libraries ====
- Ardeşen County Public Library
- Çamlıhemşin County Public Library
- Çayeli County Public Library
- Derepazarı County Public Library
- Fındıklı County Public Library
- Güneysu County Public Library
- Hemşin County Public Library
- İkizdere County Public Library
- İyidere County Public Library
- Kalkandere County Public Library
- Pazar County Public Library

=== Sinop ===
Dr. Rıza Nur Public Library

=== Trabzon ===
- KTU Faik Ahmet Barutçu Library
- Trabzon Provincial Public Library
- Trabzon Children's Library
- Trabzon Akyazı Public Library
- Beşikdüzü Resullü Public Library
- Of Uğurlu Public Library
- Şalpazarı Geyikli Public Library
- Joganita Trabzon Library of Soccer
- Trabzon STEM High School (former Trabzon High School) Library

==== County Public Libraries ====
- Akçaabat County Public Library
- Araklı County Public Library
- Arsin County Public Library
- Beşikdüzü County Public Library
- Çaykara County Public Library
- Düzköy County Public Library
- Hayrat County Public Library
- Maçka County Public Library
- Of County Public Library
- Sürmene 100th Anniversary County Public Library
- Şalpazarı County Public Library
- Tonya County Public Library
- Vakfıkebir County Public Library
- Yomra County Public Library
- İsmail Hakkı Berkmen Center of History

=== Bartın ===
- Bartın Provincial Public Library
- Bartın Arıt 75th Anniversary Public Library
- Kurucaşile County Public Library
- Ulus Culture and Arts Center County Public Library

== See also ==
- Libraries among the Turks (in Turkish)
- Library associations in Turkey
  - Anatolian University Library Consortium Association (ANKOS)
  - Turkish Librarians' Association (in Turkish)
- Copyright law of Turkey
- Access to public information in Turkey
- Mass media in Turkey
