= Beyazıt Square =

Square in Fatih, Istanbul, Turkey

Beyazıt Square Turkish: Beyazıt Meydanı
- Square
- Freedom Square (Hürriyet Meydanı)
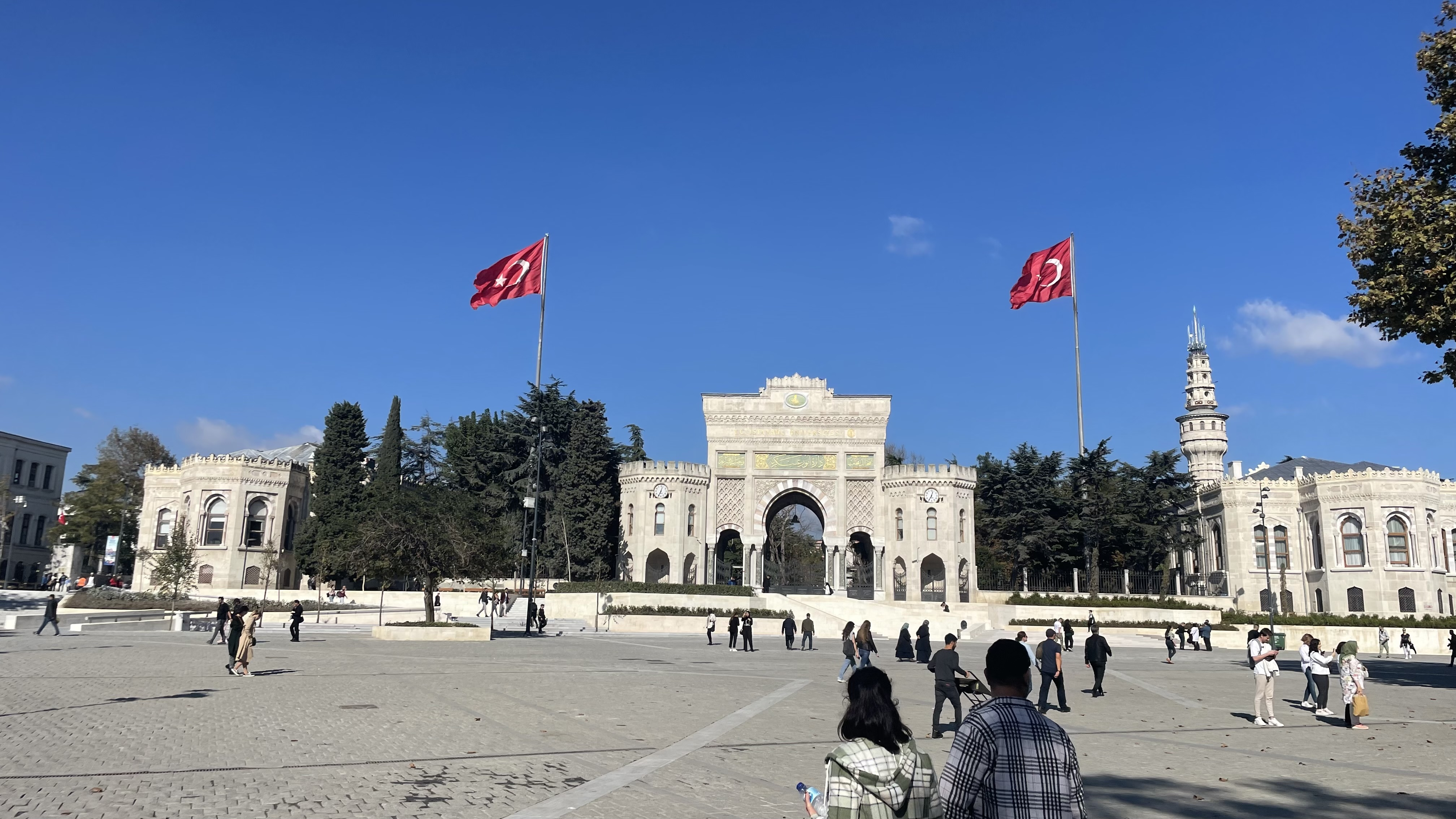
- Main entrance gate of Istanbul University on Beyazıt Square. Beyazıt Tower, located within the campus, is seen in the background.
- Location: Fatih, Istanbul, Turkey
- Location in Istanbul
- Coordinates: 41°0′38″N 28°57′52″E

Beyazıt Square (Turkish: Beyazıt Meydanı) lies to the north of Ordu Caddesi in the district of Fatih, Istanbul, Turkey. Officially named Freedom Square (Hürriyet Meydanı), it is more generally known as Beyazıt Square after the early Ottoman Bayezid II Mosque on one side. The square is the former site of the Forum of Theodosius (AKA Forum Tauri) built by Constantine the Great. In 1960 with the proposal of Turgut Cansever, Beyazıt Square was given a new form but the project was not completed. In 2022 Beyazit Square was entirely re-organised according to the urban design project prepared by Ali Kural and Deniz Çalış Kural.

== Overview ==
Facing the mosque across the square is a medrese that formed part of its complex. In the past this served as a Museum of Calligraphy. After long years of closure, this was under restoration in 2022.

On one side of the square is the main entrance to Istanbul University, its buildings designed by the French architect Marie-Auguste Antoine Bourgeois. It is accessible via a grand Neo-Renaissance arch. The Beyazıt Tower, once a fire-warning tower, in the grounds of the university is visible from the square.

Between the entrance to the university and the mosque is the Beyazit State Library, founded in 1884 and completely renovated and modernised in 2006 by the Tabanlıoğlu firm of architects. During the course of the renovation the remains of a Byzantine church were found below the site. Before its conversion into a library the building had been used as a soup kitchen and caravanserai.

The square has been the site of political protests, including some in 1969 known as Bloody Sunday, and a terrorist attack in 1978 (Beyazıt Massacre). In 1915 twenty Armenian activists were hanged in the square (The 20 Hunchakian gallows). The square is featured in Nâzim Hikmet's poem "The Death on Beyazıt Square" (Beyazıt Meydanındaki Ölü).

Beyazit Square is accessible via the T1 tram line as is the adjacent Covered Bazaar (Kapalı Çarşı).

Beyazıt Square and it environs is renewed with the Urban Design Project prepared by Ali Kural and Deniz Çalış Kural. Approved on June 23, 2021, in the joint session of the Cultural Heritage Renewal Board No.1 and the Conservation Board No.4, implementation started in July 2021, Beyazıt Square was opened to public on October 6, 2022, by Mr. Ekrem İmamoğlu, the Mayor of Istanbul.

The group of plazas that constitute Beyazıt Square were enhanced in definition and the pedestrian space was extended. Access was improved with redesigned pedestrian routes and universal standards. Redesigned floor coverings, new resting and viewing terraces provide a better perception of the monuments. Two coffee houses bring amenities and new lighting scheme provides a welcoming experience in the evening. Existing trees were preserved, while new trees and vegetation were planted to complement the redesign of Beyazıt Square.

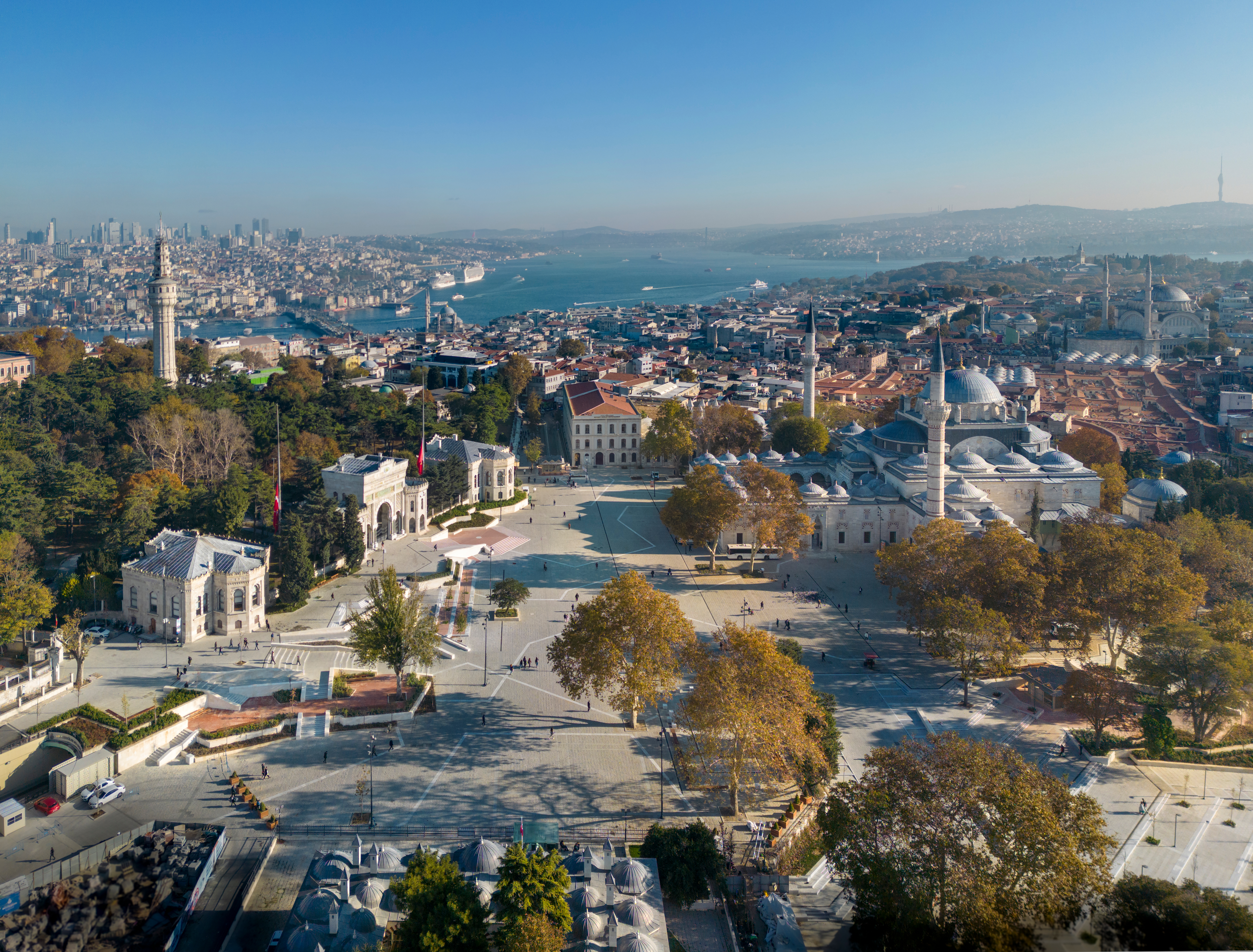
