= Library of Grand National Assembly =

- Büyük Millet Meclisi Kütüphanesi
- Location: Çankaya, Ankara, Turkey
- Established: 28 September 1920

Collection
- Items collected: Books; academic journals; newspapers; magazines; sound recordings; maps and etchings
- Size: 210,000 (Internet catalog)

Access and use
- Population served: Members of the Grand National Assembly of Turkey

Other information
- Director: Mehmet Toprak
- Employees: 103
- Website: Official website

The Library of Grand National Assembly (Turkish: Büyük Millet Meclisi Kütüphanesi), also known as the Library of Parliament or TBMM Library, is a parliamentary library dating back to 1908. It has been serving members of the Grand National Assembly of Turkey in its current building since 21 December 1960.

== Collection ==
There are approximately 400,000 works in the library collection. As of 20 January 2020, the number of artifacts in the library catalog is 211,226.

=== Manuscripts ===
There are 112 manuscripts in the TBMM Library. Among the most interesting of these are the Vaveyla newspaper written in the Krasnoyarsk prisoners camp between 1915-1918 and a Quran which was presented to the library by the Bukharan People's Soviet Republic.

=== Open access system ===
In accordance with its corporate policy, the Parliament Library offers the works it deems appropriate to all its users through the TBMM Open Access System. Within the open access system, political party publications, institutional publications, rare works written in Ottoman Turkish, various research reports and other works are available.

== Building ==
The current building of the Grand National Assembly of Turkey, unlike the previous buildings, was planned in the initial phase to include the parliament and some of its associated entities. Within the framework of this planning, the area used by the library today was developed specifically for it to give service to its users. The library, which is set up in a 2,550 m^{2} area, is the closest to the parliamentarians in the main building of the Parliament out of the surrounding buildings.

There are reading halls on the right and left sides of the library's entrance, where local and foreign newspapers and magazines are presented for the benefit of the members of Parliament. Next to the entrance corridor are executive rooms and work offices, and lending and photocopy units, and at the end of the corridor is the Great Reading Hall. In the Great Reading Hall, information / reference resources that contain new information are put into service, while the old editions or issues of other books, newspapers and magazines that make up the majority of the library collection are kept in a four-storey store under the hall. In addition to the technical service offices on the ground floor and lower floor of the library, a reading room located right next to the Public Relations Building also serves the parliamentary advisors.

== Units ==
The units in the library are as follows:

- Cataloging unit
- Periodicals and provisioning unit
- Borrowing unit
- Journal documentation unit
- Record documentation unit
- Microfilm unit
- Advisory unit

== Using the library ==
Although the TBMM Library serves only members working within the institution, it is open to the whole country provided that the resources required by the researchers are only available in the TBMM Library.

In order to benefit from the library as a researcher, the Library and Archive Directorate research application form must be filled.

== See also ==
- List of libraries in Turkey
