= Eygi =

Eygi is a Turkish surname. Notable people with the surname include:

- Ayşenur Ezgi Eygi (1998–2024), Turkish-American human rights activist
- Mehmed Şevket Eygi (1933–2019), Turkish journalist and conspiracy theorist
