= Nation's Library =

Public library in Turkey

The Nation's Library of the Presidency
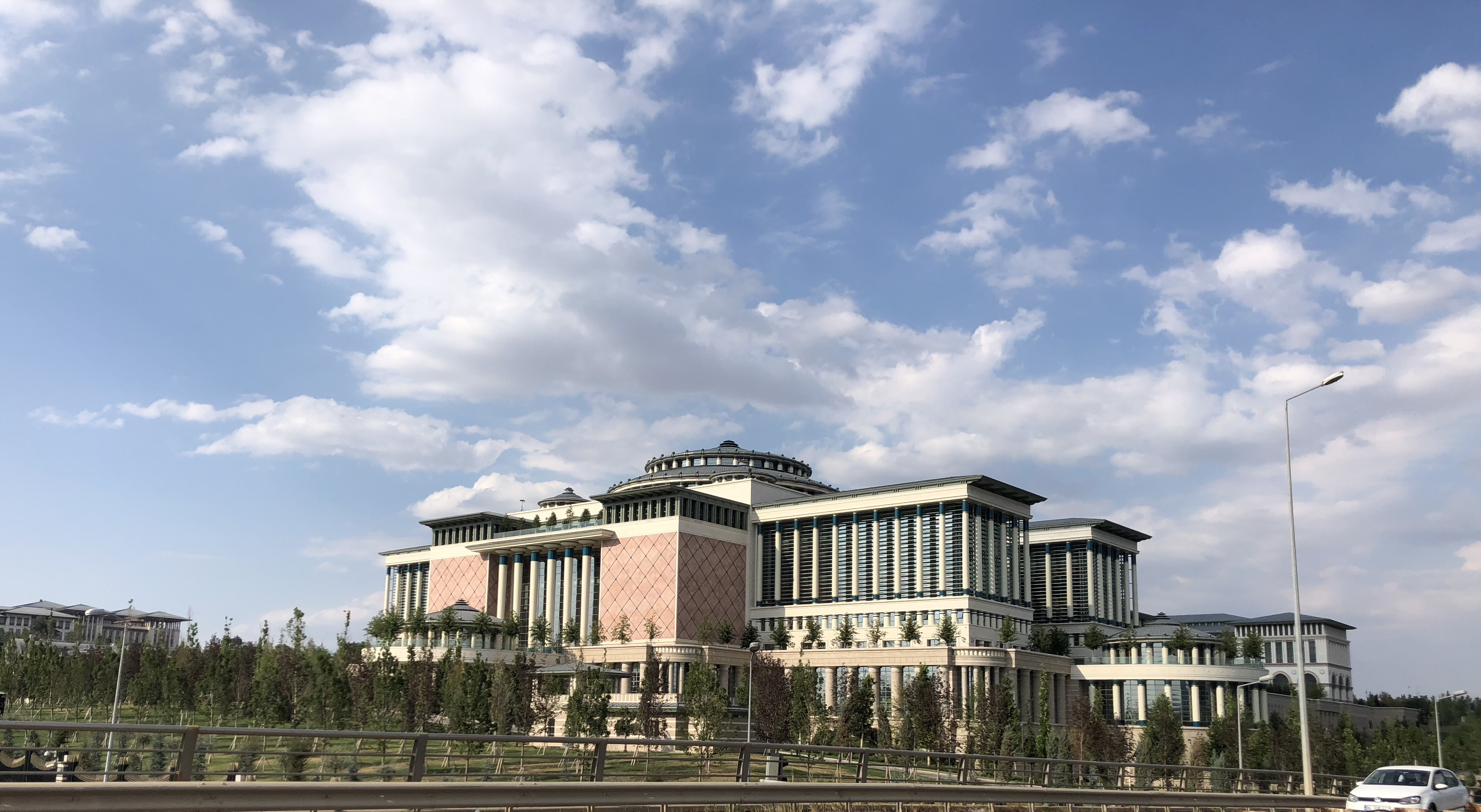
- The Nation's Library
- 39.924747575129935°N 32.800786001858526°E
- Location: Presidential Complex, Ankara
- Established: 20 February 2020; 6 years ago

Collection
- Items collected: Books, academic journals, newspapers, magazines, sound and music recordings, patents, databases, maps, postage stamps, prints, drawings, and manuscripts
- Size: The Nation's Library has 5,048,493 printed resources, including 2,168,302 books and 2,948,290 periodicals belonging to 25,017 printed journals in 134 different languages. The Nation's Library has a combined total of 141,718,843 books, documents, notebooks, dia, maps, etc., which are available to researchers together with the inventory of the Directorate of State Archives.
- Legal deposit: https://mk.gov.tr/icerik/detay/kutuphane-hakkinda

Access and use
- Access requirements: Open 24/7 to anyone with Turkish ID or foreign passport
- Population served: up to 5,000 visitors at a time

Other information
- Director: Ayhan Tuğlu (director)

The Nation's Library of the Presidency (Turkish: Cumhurbaşkanlığı Millet Kütüphanesi), also simply called the Nation's Library, is a public library in the Republic of Turkey. Located inside the Presidential Complex in Ankara, the library was established in 2016 and officially opened by President Recep Tayyip Erdoğan on 20 February 2020, with approximately 2,000 guests in attendance. The Nation's Library is the largest library in the country, with an estimated 5,048,493 printed resources, including 2,168,302 books and 2,948,290 periodicals belonging to 25,017 printed journals in 134 different languages, and serves as a repository for more than 300 million articles and reports in 233 sub-databases belonging to 73 main databases.

The physical library building covers a floor area of 125,000 square meters and can accommodate up to 5,000 patrons at a time. The building is decorated with white and pink marble and is designed with traditional Seljuk, Ottoman and contemporary motifs. Since 2020, by providing digital access to 103,350 books, 136 million documents, and 567,000 notebooks from the collection of the Directorate of State Archives, it has become one of the world’s leading libraries. The Nation's Library has a combined total of 141,718,843 books, documents, notebooks, dia, maps, etc., which are available to researchers along with the inventory of the Directorate of State Archives.

== History ==
The Nation's Library project, led by President Recep Tayyip Erdoğan, was formalized in 2016 through the efforts of Turkish intellectuals, librarians, and NGOs, and inaugurated in February 2020. The project is the largest single library investment in the history of the Turkish Republic. It is also the first library in Turkey to use integrated book conveyor systems.

== Famous patrons ==
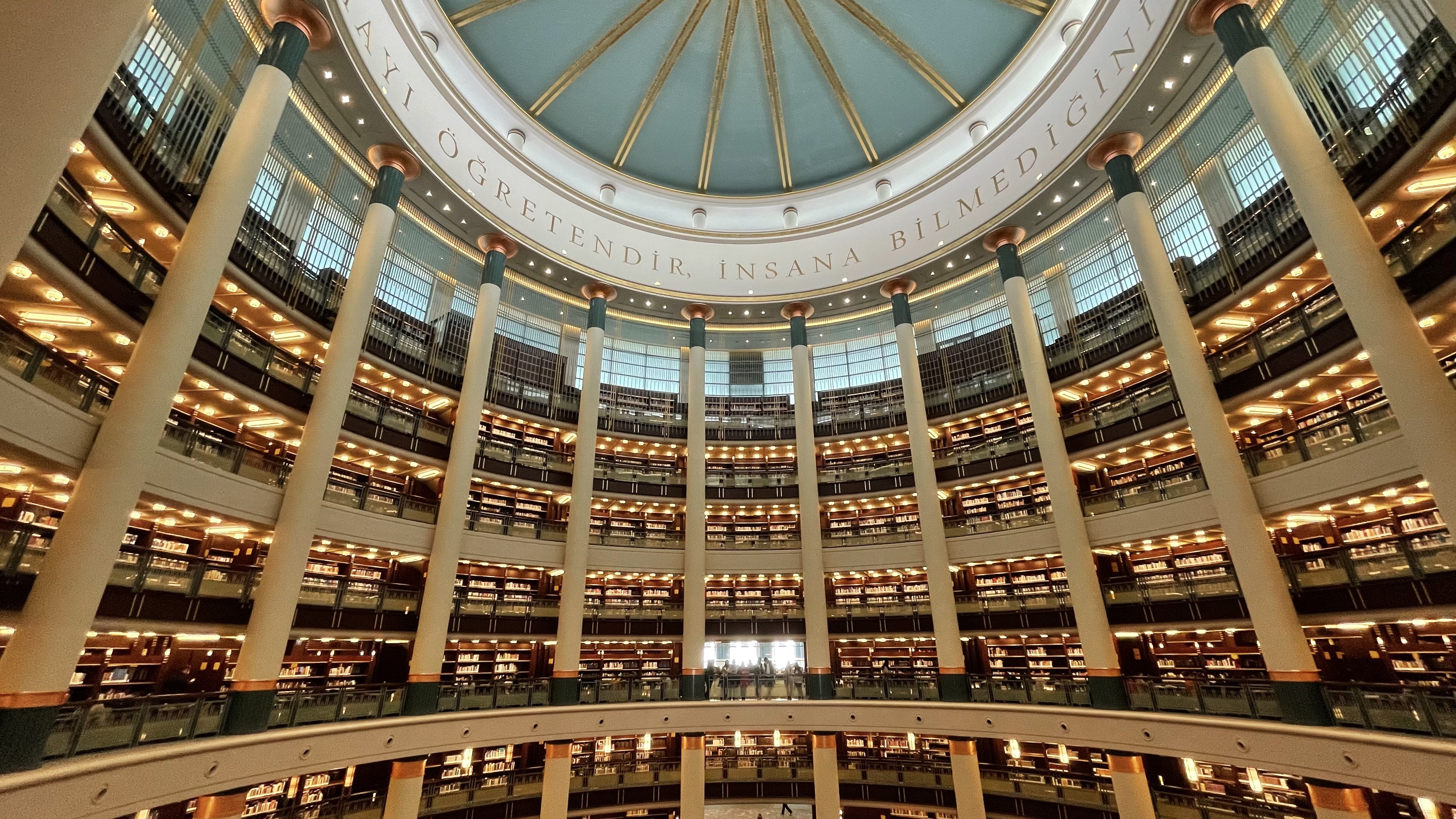
Cihannüma Hall

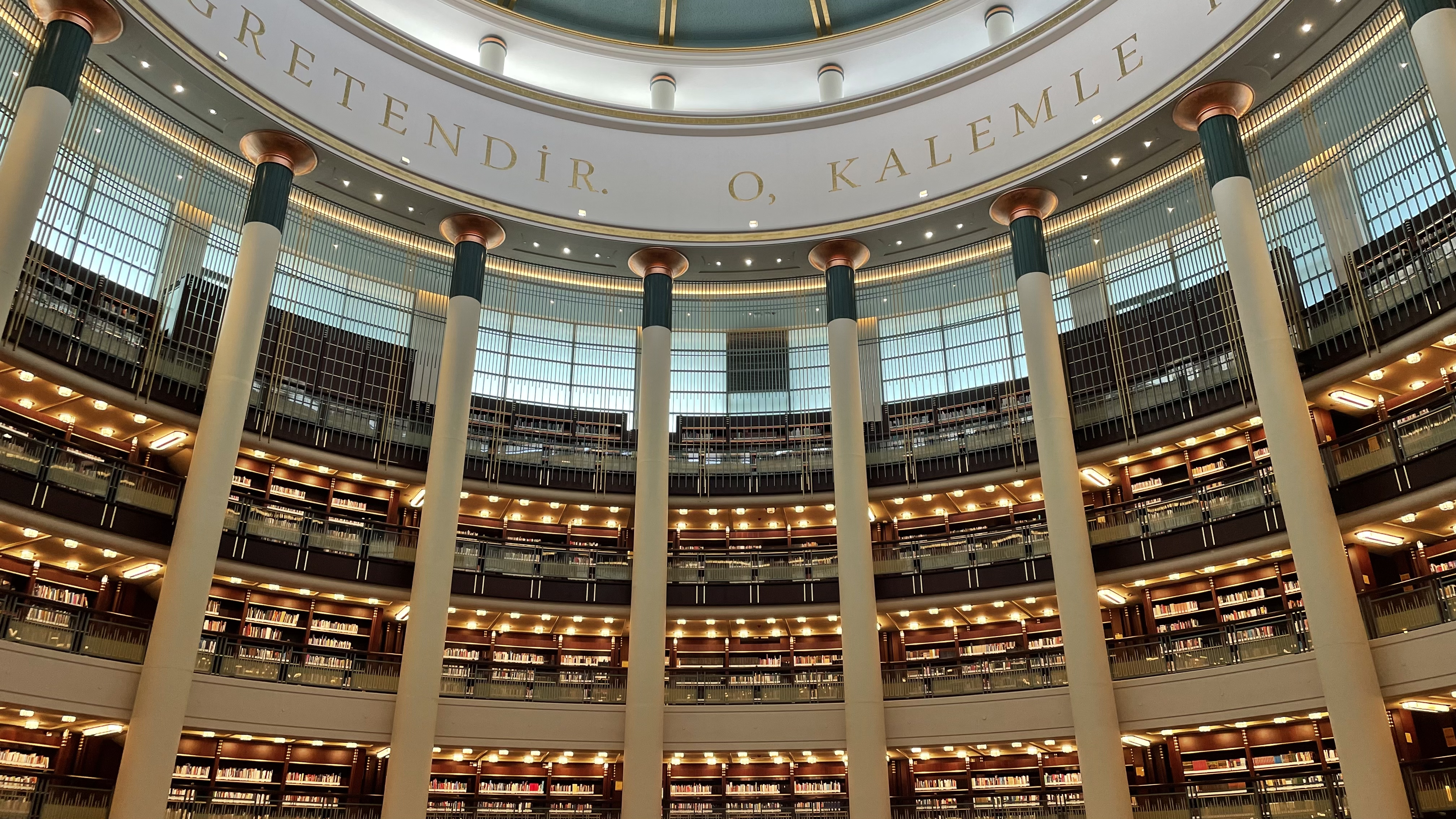
Cihannüma Hall

People who donated to the Nation's Library from their personal collections include:

- President Erdoğan
- Ambassadors of Uzbekistan, India, Chile, China, France, and Belarus
- Historian İlber Ortaylı
- Literary critic and historian Abdülbaki Gölpınarlı
- Oud master and composer Cinuçen Tanrıkorur
- Author Şefik Can
- Restaurateur Mehmet S. Tezcakin
- Former Minister Hasan Celal Güzel
- Author and journalist Mehmed Şevket Eygi
- Art historian Mustafa Kamil Dürüst
- Poet Mustafa Şerif Onaran
- Director Muhsin Mete
- Publisher Saman-Hatice Helvacıoğlu
- Sociologist Cemil Meriç

In addition, French President Emmanuel Macron sent a special envoy to propose collaboration between the Nation's Library and his own country's Bibliothèque nationale de France in the field of literature.

== Accessibility ==
The Nation's Library is designed to be accessible by wheelchair, and the country's leading telecommunications companies, Turkcell and Türk Telekom, prepared technology rooms for vision- and hearing-impaired users.

== Cihannuma Hall ==
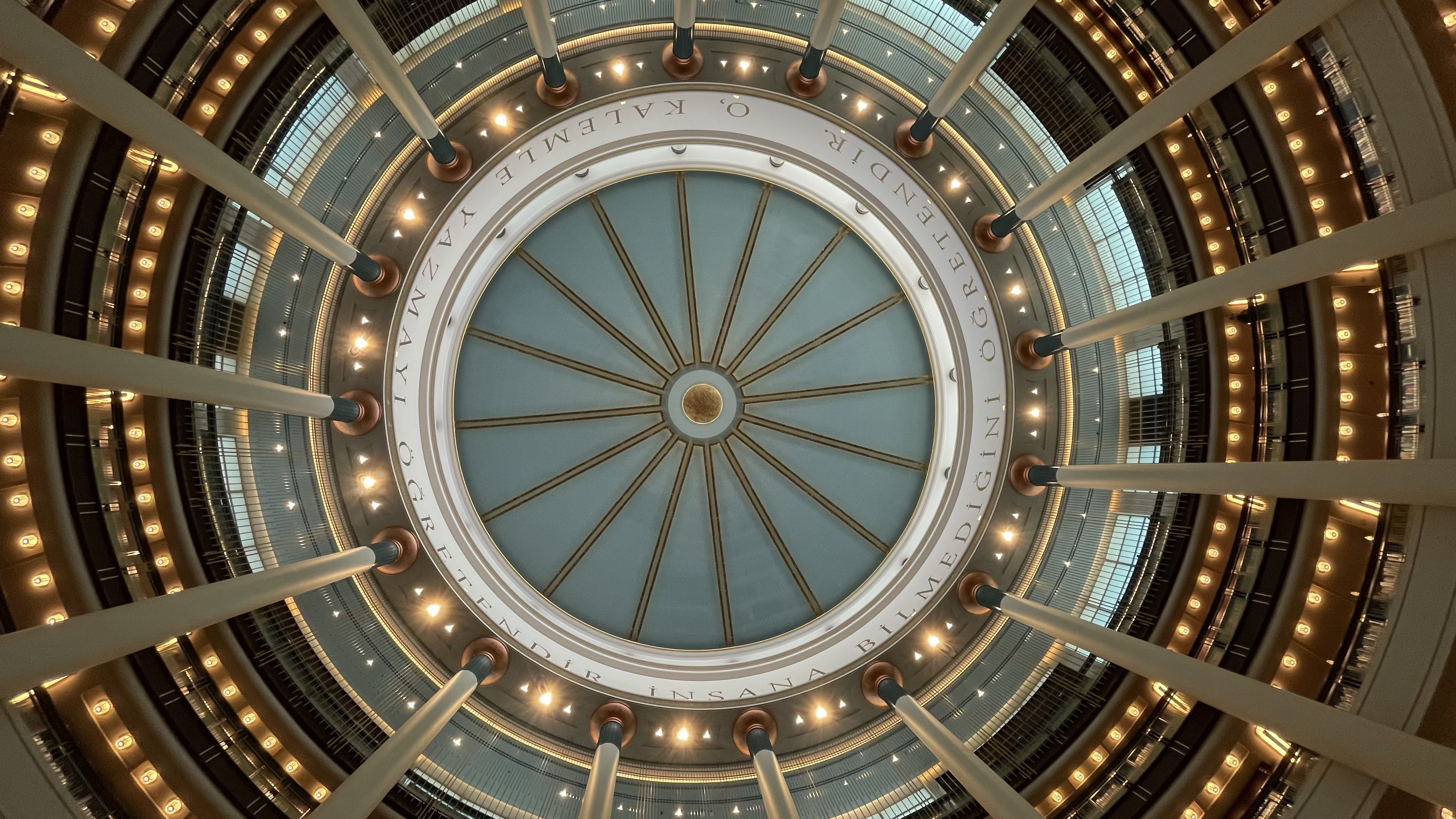
Roof of the Cihannüma Hall

The Cihannuma (World Atlas) Hall, decorated with 16 columns representing the 16 Great Turkic Empires, houses a collection of 200,000 books and has a seating capacity for 224 readers at a time in an area of 3,500 square meters. The dome of the Cihannuma Hall is 32 meters high and 27 meters wide.

Verses four and five of sura al-Alaq from the Quran, the first to be revealed to Muhammad, on the significance of reading and writing, are inscribed on the dome of the hall: O, kalemle yazmayı öğretendir, insana bilmediğini öğretendir ("He is the one who taught how to write with a pen, taught the human being what he did not know").

Books brought in collaboration with the Foreign Ministry on the culture and history of the countries where Turkey has a diplomatic mission are displayed in the World Library inside Cihannuma Hall.

== Collections and exhibits ==
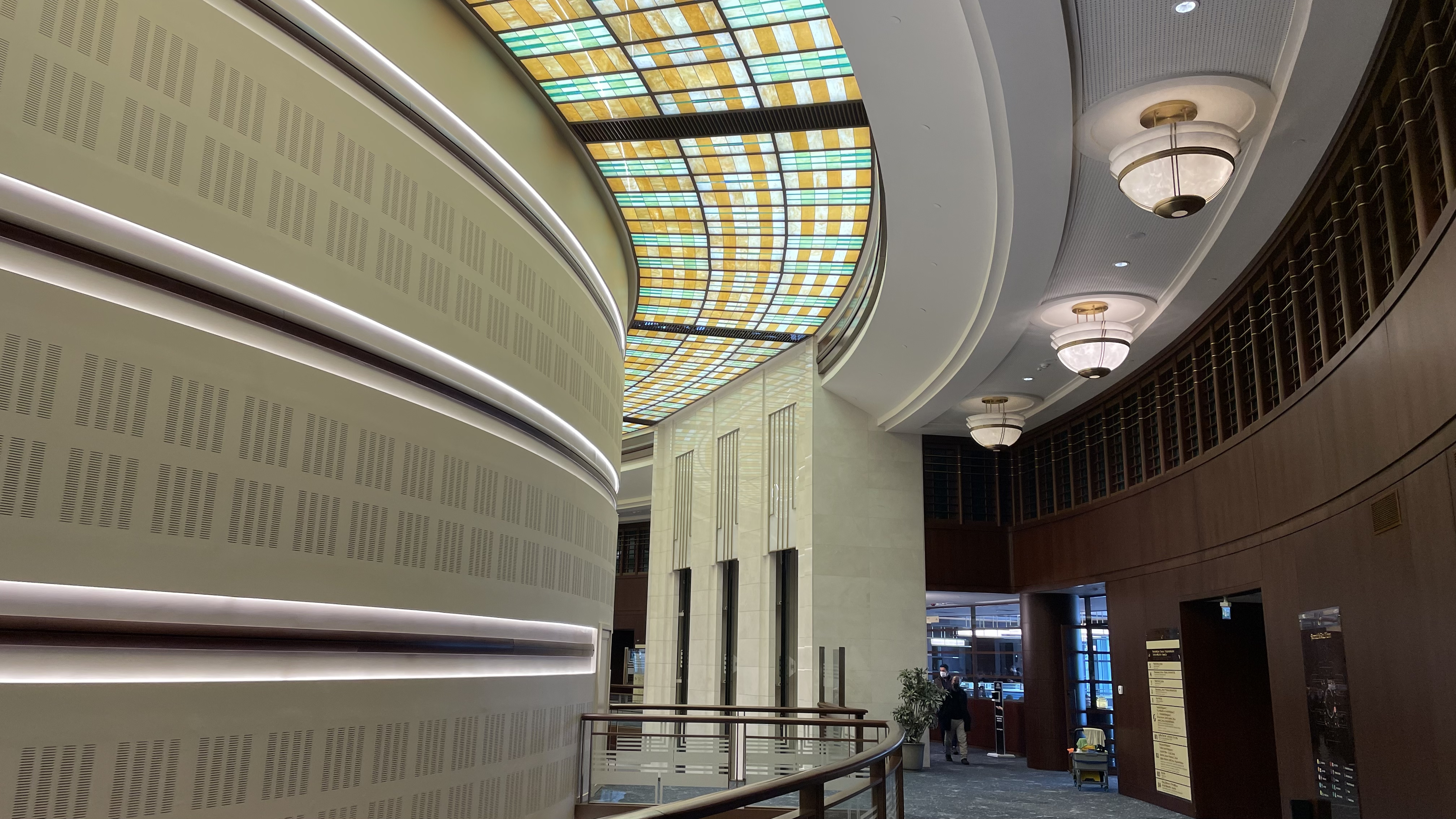
Staircase of the 5th floor

=== The Rare Books Library ===
The Rare Books Library contains 50,000 books, including Abdülbaki Gölpınarlı manuscripts and Mehmet Şevket Eygi Collections.

=== Research Library ===
The Research Library has a collection of nearly 20,000 books and 20 group study rooms.

=== Nasreddin Hodja Children's Library ===
The Nasreddin Hodja Children's Library, named after the Seljuk satirist Nasreddin Hodja, is available for readers between the ages of five and ten, with a collection of 25,000 books and a multimedia section. The Children's Library provides activities related to traditional Turkish arts.

=== Youth Library ===
The Youth Library, which is available for readers between the ages of ten and fifteen, has a collection of 12,000 books and contains individual and group study rooms.

=== Multimedia Library ===
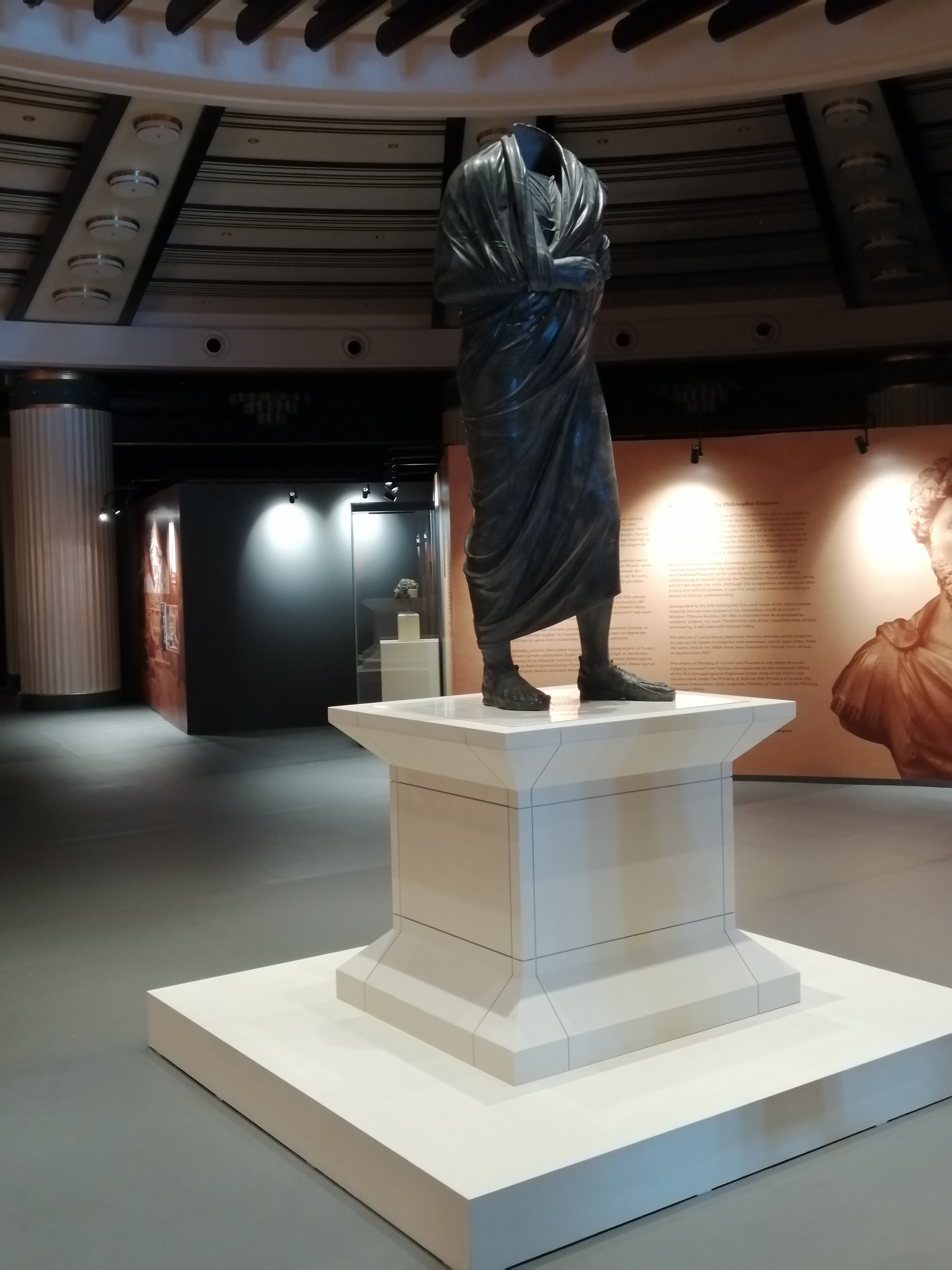
The headless statue of Marcus Aurelius displayed on floor B2

The Multimedia Library contains 12 individual study rooms for four digital rooms that are equipped with touchscreen monitors and offer access to TRT archives and nearly 10,000 audiovisual materials.

=== Periodicals Hall ===
The Periodicals Hall has a collection of 1,550 magazines and newspapers and offers access to a 90-day archive of 7,000 dailies and magazines from 120 countries in 60 languages in full page on touchscreen monitors that also feature a catalog search.

=== Reading Rooms ===
The Reading Rooms have a collection of 300,000 books as well as 32 group study rooms and 8 lounges.

=== Conference Hall ===
The Conference Hall, with its four simultaneous interpretation cabins, is designed to host international conferences and meetings.

== Online, electronic and digital resources ==
The Nation's Library offers access to:

- 45 million documents from the State Archives
- 300,000 manuscripts within the Manuscripts Institution of Turkey
- 550,000 e-books, 6.5 million e-dissertations, 120 million articles, and 60,000 e-magazines from 46 databases, to which the Turkish Academic Network and Information Center and the Presidency are subscribed.

== See also ==
- National Library of Turkey
- Presidential Complex
- List of national libraries
- List of libraries in Turkey
- List of libraries in Ankara
- List of largest libraries
- Turkish literature
