= CBAL =

CBAL may refer to:

- CBAL-FM, a radio station (98.3 FM) licensed to Moncton, New Brunswick, Canada
- Core Biochemical Assay Laboratory at COMU Hospital, Turkey

== See also ==
- Ampere balance, or current balance
