= Turgut Cansever =

Turkish architect and city planner

- Born: 12 September 1921; Antalya, Turkey
- Died: 22 February 2009 (aged 87); Kadıköy, Istanbul, Turkey
- Education: Galatasaray High School; Istanbul State Academy of Fine Arts
- Occupation: Architect
- Awards: Aga Khan Award for Architecture
- Projects: Ertegün House; Demir Holiday Village; Turkish Historical Society

Turgut Cansever (12 September 1921 – 22 February 2009) was a prominent Turkish architect and city planner. He is the only architect to win the Aga Khan Award for Architecture three times. He is known as "the wise architect." He played a significant role in urban planning, zoning, and protected area projects across various towns. He is credited with designing Beyazıt Square and authored the first doctoral thesis on art history in Turkey.

== Early life ==
Turgut Cansever was born in Antalya in 1921 to Hasan and Saime Ferit, the eldest of five children. His father, Hasan, was an intellectual and prominent physician who served on the Sina Front during the war, while his mother, Saime, was a teacher from Plovdiv. His parents fostered his early interest in art, religion, and education, values that deeply influenced his work and writings throughout his life. In 1952, he married Nilufer Cansever, and the couple had three children—Hasan, Emine, and Feyza—all of whom pursued careers in architecture.

Cansever attended primary school in Ankara and Bursa before moving with his family to Istanbul, where he completed his education at Galatasaray High School. There, he formed connections with future intellectuals and artists, including Turan Güneş, Turhan Feyzioğlu, İlhan Usmanbaş, Avni Arbaş, and Cihat Burak.

Initially aspiring to become an artist, Cansever enrolled at the Istanbul State Academy of Fine Arts, where he chose to study architecture and worked as an assistant to Sedad Hakkı Eldem, one of Turkey's leading architects. After earning his degree in 1946, he began his doctoral research under Islamic Art Historian Ernst Diez.

In 1949, Cansever completed his groundbreaking doctoral thesis, Stylistic Analysis of Ottoman and Seljuk Column Heads, which covered 14 Anatolian cities and 111 structures. It was the first doctoral thesis in art history in Turkey and was later published under the title Chasing Eternal Space: Column Heads in Ottoman and Seljuk Art.

== Career ==
Turgut Cansever began his architectural career with the restoration of Sadullah Paşa's waterfront mansion in 1949. In 1951, he established his first architectural office with Abdurrahman Hancı. One of their notable early projects was the Anatolian Club Hotel. During the 1950s, Cansever also contributed to the design of the Karatepe open-air museum, Diyarbakır Maarif College, the Middle East Technical University (METU) Campus Contest project, and the Turkish Historical Society building.

In 1958, Cansever started the design of Beyazıt Square, which marked his involvement in urban planning, zoning, and the preservation of protected areas. He headed the Marmara Region Planning Organization from 1959 to 1960 and served on the Istanbul Municipality Planning Authority in 1961. Cansever earned the title of associate professor in 1960 with his thesis Problems of Modern Architecture at the Istanbul University Faculty of Letters. During the same period, he traveled extensively in Europe, spending significant time in France.

The Turkish Historical Society building (1951–1967, Ankara, co-designed with Ertur Yener) earned him his first Aga Khan Award for Architecture in 1980. His restoration of the Ahmet Ertegün House (1971–1973, Bodrum) brought him his second Aga Khan Award the same year. Cansever became the only architect to win the Aga Khan Award three times, with his third award in 1992 for the Demir Holiday Village project in Mandalya Bay, which consisted of three hotels and 500 houses, designed in collaboration with Emine Ogun, Mehmet Ogun, and Feyza Cansever.

From 1974 to 1975, Cansever headed the World Bank Istanbul Metropolitan Planning Project. Between 1974 and 1976, he served as a member of the Turkey Delegation to the European Council and worked for the Istanbul Municipality from 1975 to 1980. In 1979, he contributed to Ankara Municipality's metropolitan planning efforts, focusing on new habitation and town centers, while also serving as a preservation adviser.

In 1983, he served as an educational program adviser at Makkah University and was a member of the Master Jury for the Aga Khan Award for Architecture.

In the 1990s, Cansever published numerous articles and compiled them into books. In 2005, he released a monumental book on Mimar Sinan, further solidifying his reputation as a scholar and architectural thinker.

In 2007, a retrospective exhibition titled Turgut Cansever: Architect and Thinker was held in Istanbul, showcasing archival materials and his significant contributions to architecture and urban planning.

Cansever's health declined in the later years of his life. He was fitted with a pacemaker in 2000 and became bedbound from 2008 onward. He died on 22 February 2009 at his home in Kadıköy, Istanbul, and was buried the following day at Edirnekapı Cemetery.

== Legacy ==
Cansever was a notable thinker in the fields of religion and architecture. He argued that the act of judgment, bestowed upon humanity by divine will, enables architects to exercise creativity and originality in their designs. Cansever expressed concerns regarding the state of mosque architecture in the 20th century, particularly within Muslim societies. He criticized the reliance on replication of historical designs and the lack of innovation in contemporary mosque architecture. In response, his own mosque designs introduced new forms, aiming to advance the architectural expression of Islamic traditions.
