= ÇOMÜ Ulupınar Observatory =

ÇOMÜ Ulupınar Observatory ÇOMÜ Ulupınar Gözlemevi
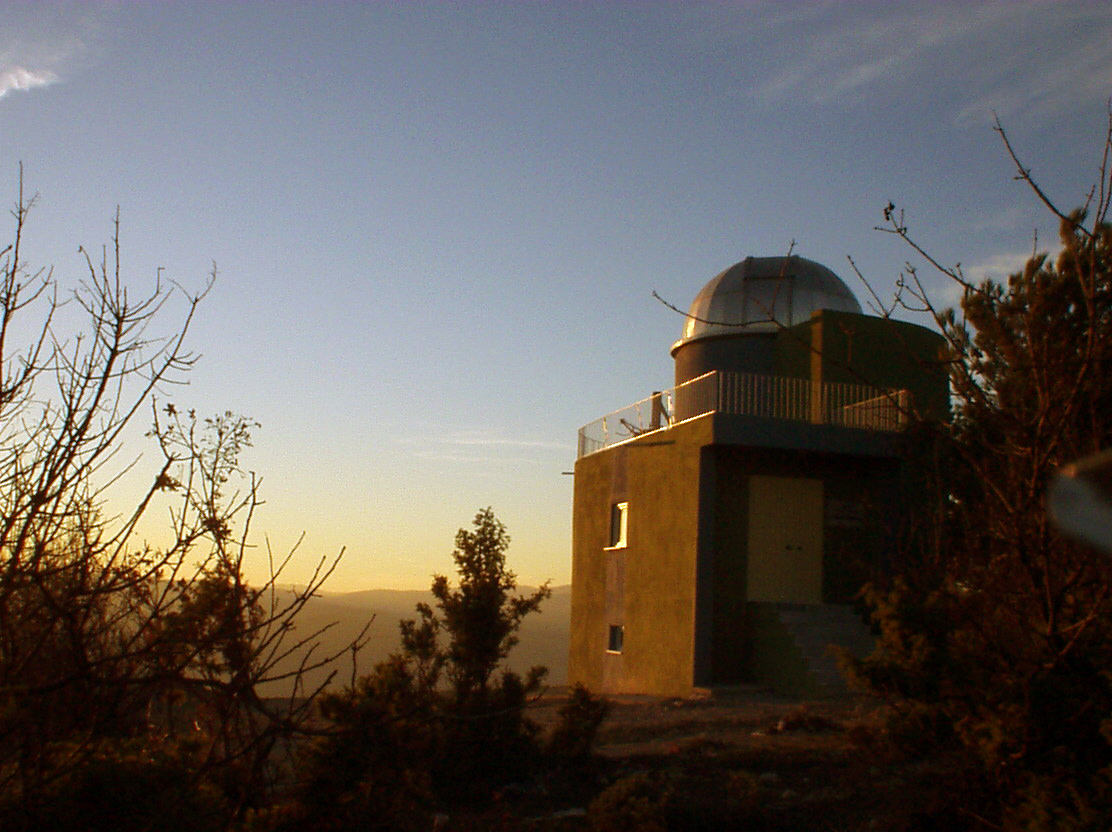
- ÇOMÜ Ulupınar Observatory in 2012
- Organization: Çanakkale Onsekiz Mart University
- Location: Radar Tepesi, Ulupınar, Çanakkale, Turkey
- Coordinates: 40°05′57″N 26°28′29″E
- Altitude: 410 m (1,350 ft)
- Established: May 19, 2002
- Website: physics.comu.edu.tr/english/caam

Telescopes
- T-122: Cassegrain-Nasymth telescope
- IST-60: Cassegrain telescope
- T-40 (Meade LX200): Schmidt–Cassegrain
- T-30 (Meade LX200): Schmidt–Cassegrain
- T-20 (Meade LX200): Schmidt–Cassegrain
- Related media on Commons

The ÇOMÜ Ulupınar Observatory (UPO) (Turkish: Ulupınar Gözlemevi) is a ground-based astronomical observatory, which was established in 2001 and formally opened on 19 May 2002. It is also known as Çanakkale Observatory or the University Observatory. The Ulupınar Observatory is part of the Çanakkale Onsekiz Mart University (ÇOMÜ) Faculty of Science and Arts.

The observatory is located at an altitude of 410 m (1,350 ft) on the southern slope of the Radar Tepesi in Ulupınar village 10 km (6.2 mi) south-east of downtown Çanakkale and 5 km (3.1 mi) from the university's main campus. The observatory and its research center premises include a library, a workshop, a classroom, a conference hall and living quarters for night observing astronomers.

Ulupınar Observatory began its activity with a donated 0.40m telescope. It has expanded to a facility having seven telescopes operated by 30 scientists. There are three computer-controlled optical telescopes with several other instruments including the biggest telescopes in Turkey, among them a 1.22m telescope made in Germany. There is also an automated meteorological station fully active at the observatory.

== Telescopes ==
T-122

- ASTELCO 122 cm Cassegrain-Nasymth telescope
- Altazimuth mount
- Focal length: 10220 mm
- Focal ratio: f/10

IST-60

- Istanbul University collaboration
- ASTELCO 60 cm Cassegrain telescope
- German-Equatorial Mount: NTM-500
- Focal length: 6000 mm
- Focal ratio: f/8

T-40

- Meade LX200 model Schmidt–Cassegrain telescope
- Number of objects in memory: 145,000
- Diameter: 16 in (410 mm)
- Optical tube heat adjusting fan
- Focal length: 4,064 mm (13 ft 4.0 in)
- Focal ratio: f/10

T-30 (two pieces)

- Meade LX200 model Schmidt–Cassegrain telescope
- Number of objects in memory: 145,000
- Diameter: 12 in (300 mm)
- Focal Length: 3,048 mm (10 ft 0 in)
- Focal Ratio: f/10

T-20

- Aiming for amateur usage
- Newtonian telescope
- Diameter: 20 cm (7.9 in)
- Focal Ratio: f/10 T-10

SSP-5 Photoelectric photometer

- Computer-controlled
- UBVRI Johnson filters
- Focal length: 25 mm (0.98 in)
- Optical design: Ramsden
- Field of view: 0.4 degree in 2,000 mm (79 in) focal length CCD Camera
- Santa Barbara Instrument Group SBIG-ST237 model CCD imaging camera
- Pixel size: 7.4 by 7.4 micrometres (0.00029 in × 0.00029 in)
- Chip size 657 × 495 pixels (4.7 × 3.6 mm)

== See also ==
- List of astronomical observatories
