= Çanakkale Onsekiz Mart University =

Public university in Çanakkale, Turkey

Coordinates: 40.1137°N 26.4087°E

Canakkale Onsekiz Mart University
- Type: Public coeducational
- Established: 1992
- Chancellor: Prof.Dr. Ramazan Cüneyt Erenoglu
- Administrative staff: 1983
- Students: 48.773
- Location: Çanakkale, Turkey
- Campus: Urban
- Website: www.comu.edu.tr (engl.)

University rankings

Regional – Overall
- QS Emerging Europe and Central Asia: 251-300 (2022)

Çanakkale Onsekiz Mart University (informally ÇOMÜ) is a Turkish public research university located in Çanakkale province, near Gallipoli and its surrounding towns. It is a member of the Balkan Universities Network, the European University Association (EUA), International Association of Universities (IAU), and the Thrace Universities Union.

== History ==
=== Thrace University Period ===
Some of the ÇOMÜ colleges were part of the Trakya (Thrace) University before 1992. The Faculty of Education is rooted in the 1950s. The Çanakkale Vocational School was also part of the Thrace University (Edirne).

=== Foundation ===
The ÇOMÜ was founded in 1992 based upon the Faculty of Education on the Anafartalar Campus by the Turkish Parliament law. Before this the facilities had housed a teacher training institute that was a branch of Trakya University. The first rector of the university was Prof. Dr. Mete Tuncoku.

In the 2005–2006 academic year there were over 19,000 students, with 960 academic staff in two graduate schools, nine faculties, two polytechnic colleges (four-year programs) and 11 vocational colleges (two-year programs). There are several campuses in Çanakkale itself, while some of the academic units are located in other towns of the province.

From October 20 to 24, 2010, the university hosted the World Universities Congress, which focused on addressing the question, 'What can world universities do to prevent global problems?'

The number of academicians in the ÇOMÜ is over 1800 and the student number is over 48.610 in 2020.

The current rector of the university is Prof. Dr. Sedat Murat.

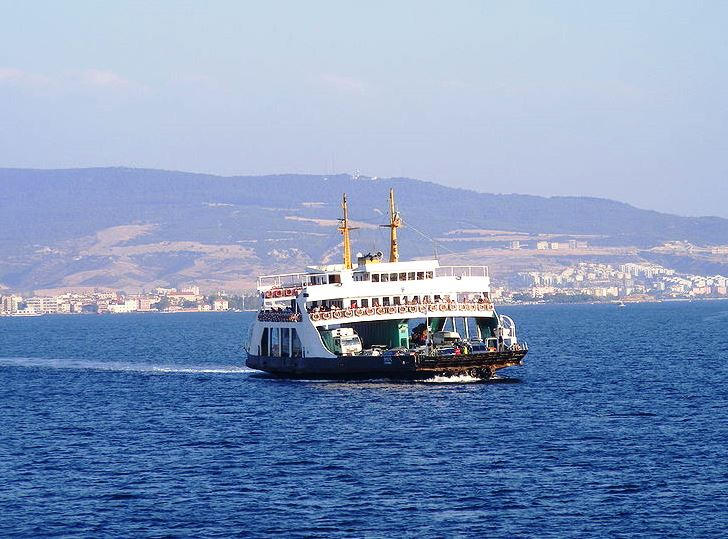
Çanakkale town and the University of Çanakkale from the Sea

== Academics ==
As of 2020, ÇOMÜ has approximately 48,800 students, of which 30,100 are enrolled in undergraduate programs, 13,600 in 2-years programs, and about 3,600 in MA and PhD programs. Each academic year, the ÇOMÜ hosts over 2000 regular international students from 68 different countries. As of 2020, the number of academical personnel is 1920. The total number of personnel reaches 3,000. The number of the alumni exceeds 112,000. The languages of instructions at ÇOMÜ are Turkish and English.

== Faculty Departments ==
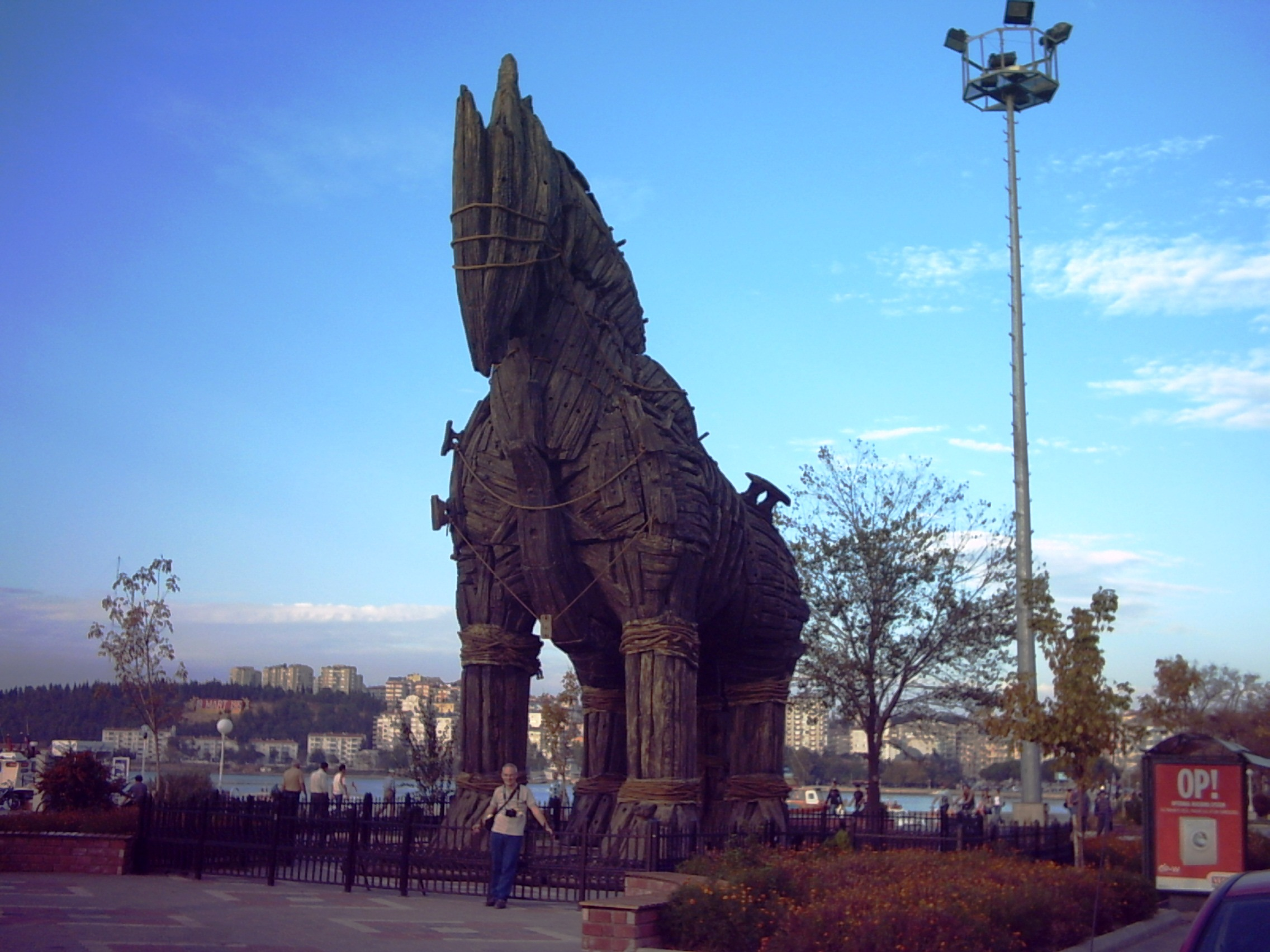
The Çanakkale seafront, with wooden horse from the 2004 film Troy

- Biga Faculty of Economics and Administrative Sciences
- Faculty of Agriculture
- Faculty of Education
- Faculty of Engineering
- Faculty of Fine Arts
- Faculty of Marine Sciences and Technologies
- Faculty of Medicine
- Faculty of Sciences and Arts
- Faculty of Theology
- Faculty of Communication
- Faculty of Political Sciences in Çanakkale
- Faculty of Architecture and Design

=== Biga Faculty of Economics and Administrative Sciences, BIIBF ===
The Biga Faculty of Economics and Managements Studies is located in Biga, a town approximately 70 kilometers from the Çanakkale city center. It offers courses at undergraduate and postgraduate levels.

The faculty publishes a quarterly journal: Journal of Administrative Sciences (YBD).

The departments are International Relations, Business Studies, Economics, Labor economics & Industrial Relations, Public Finance, Public Management.

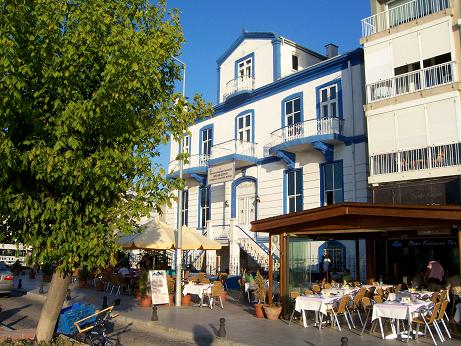
COMU Strategic Research Centre, Ibrahim KAYA. The Centre House is one of the oldest buildings in Çanakkale Town

=== Faculty of Agriculture ===
The Faculty of Agriculture is located on the main Terzioglu Campus in Çanakkale and has practical training facilities at its farm in the village of Saricaali (TETAM) and on the Dardanos Campus.

The departments are Agricultural Economics, Agricultural Construction and Irrigation, Agricultural Mechanisation, Animal Science, Field Crops, Horticulture, Landscaping, Plant Protection, Soil Science.

=== Faculty of Education ===
This is the largest faculty of the university, with approximately 4,500 students, and is on the Anafartalar Campus in the centre of Çanakkale. Departments are Computer and Educational Technology Teaching, Education Studies, Fine Arts Teaching, Foreign Language Teaching, Physical Education and Sports Teaching, Primary School Teaching, Secondary Education Social Subjects Teaching, Turkish Language Teaching.

=== Faculty of Engineering ===
The Faculty of Engineering and Architecture is temporarily located in the Faculty of Sciences and Arts building on the Terzioglu Campus, until its own building is complete. Departments are Geomatics Engineering, Computer Engineering, Food Engineering, Geological Engineering, Geophysical Engineering and Environmental Engineering.

=== Faculty of Fine Arts ===
The Faculty of Fine Arts is housed in the buildings of Faculty of Agriculture, Faculty of Theology, Çanakkale Vocational College. Nedime Hanim Friendship House is the nest for the departments of Textile, Performing and Visual Arts and Cinema and Television.

Departments are Ceramics, Cinema and Television, Performing and Visual Arts, Graphics, Painting, Photography, Sculpture, Textiles, Traditional Handicrafts.

=== Faculty of Marine Sciences and Technologies ===
The Faculty of Marine Science and Technologies was temporarily housed in the Faculty of Sciences and Arts building until the construction of its own building on the Terzioglu Campus. Its first name was Fisheries Faculty which founded in 1992 and started its academic program in 1995. It offers courses at undergraduate and postgraduate levels. It has several research facilities and laboratories for fisheries and aquatic research that encompasses a broad range of topics such as: aquaculture, water chemistry and pollution, fish diseases, biotechnology and genetics, seafood processing and quality, limnology and marine biology, and fisheries biology.

Departments are Aquaculture, Fishing and Processing, Hydrobiology.

=== Faculty of Medicine ===
The Faculty of Medicine received its first intake of students in 2002 and at present they are being educated at another university in Istanbul. Since 2007 students are educated in the Faculty of Medicine building in the main campus, Çanakkale.

The school has 320 students in 2012.

=== Faculty of Sciences and Arts ===
The Faculty of Sciences and Arts is on the Terzioglu Campus. Its departments are Archaeology, Art History, Sociology, Biology, Chemistry, English Language and Literature, Geography, History, Mathematics, Physics, Turkish Language and Literature.

The astronomical observatory ÇOMÜ Ulupınar Observatory, established in 2002, is run by the faculty.

=== Faculty of Theology ===
The ÇOMÜ Faculty of Theology is in its own building on the Terzioglu Campus. It offers undergraduate and postgraduate programmes to train students who will be able to offer their services to the community as Islamic clergymen or scholars or teachers of religious subjects in schools. Students who elect to study appropriate optional courses can also find employment in state archives or similar institutions.

Importance is also given to academic undertakings. Members of the faculty have organized national and international conferences and panel discussions, participated in interdisciplinary and regional projects (one of these funded by the Turkish Academy of Sciences), and presented papers at national and overseas conferences. Results of research undertakings are presented in publications and information about religious subjects given to the general public through participation in TV programmes and the like.

Departments are Basic Islamic Studies, Islamic History and Art, Philosophy and Religious Studies.

=== Faculty of Communication ===
Founded in 2011. It is one of latest faculties of the university with 320 students.

=== Faculty of Political Sciences in Çanakkale ===
Founded as "Faculty of Economics and Administrative Sciences" in 2012, began its first year with 11 departments (Political Science and Public Administration, Department of Economics, Department of Business Administration, Department of International Relations, Labour Economics and Industrial relations Department, Finance Department, Health Administration, Department of Social Services, Department of Econometrics, International Trade and Finance Department and the Management Information Systems Department).

Faculty's International Relations Department received its first students in the 2018–2019 academic year, on a 100% English program. As of the 2019–2020 academic year, our Business Administration department continued its education in 30% English. In addition, departments of "International Management", "Local Governments, "Urban and Environmental Policies" were established at the faculty as master programs with opened thesis and education started. Since the 2019–2020 academic year, graduate students have also been admitted to the Department of Management and Organization.

As of 2020/2021 over 2000 undergraduate students attend this faculty at various departments.

=== Faculty of Architecture and Design ===
It was part of the Faculty of the Engineering and Architecture. It became a separate faculty with the Governmental Chart in 2012 February.

== Institutes ==
=== Institute of Social Sciences ===
Offers MA and PhD degrees in international relations, political sciences, Middle East, labour relations, Turkish literature, sociology, theology, Balkans studies, management, economics. Established in 1995.

=== Institute of Science ===
Offers MA and PhD degrees in chemistry, marine sciences, geography, physics, astronomy, biology, engineering. Established in 1995.

=== Institute of Education ===
MA and PhD degrees in education established in 2011. It was part of the Institute of Social Sciences before 2011.

Çanakkale Onsekiz Mart University Institute of Education or ÇOMÜ Graduate School of Educational Sciences was established in 2010 to conduct graduate education (Master's and Doctorate) as well as scientific research and practice in areas related to educational sciences. The Graduate School began operations with 4 PhD and 14 MA degrees that were transferred from the Graduate Schools of Social Sciences and of Natural and Applied Sciences in the Autumn Semester of the 2011–2012 academic year.

=== Institute of Medical Sciences ===
Çanakkale Onsekiz Mart University Graduate School of Health Sciences or the ÇOMÜ Institute of Medical Sciences was founded in 2010 and began education and training activities in 2011 with the Department of Physical Education and Sports Teaching.

The Graduate School is engaged in efforts to open MSc and PhD programmes in the Faculty of Medicine, School of Health and School of Physical Education and Sports Teaching. It is also planned that graduates from the Departments of Dentistry, Pharmacy, Veterinary Medicine and Biology will be enrolled in these programmes for MSc and PhD degrees.

== Other Schools ==
The following 4-year schools are also part of the university.

- School of Tourism
- School of Sports
- School of Foreign Languages
- School of Health
- School of Applied Sciences (Biga)
- Gökçeada School of Applied Sciences
- School of Applied Sciences in Çan

== Vocational Schools ==
The following schools are 2-year colleges:

- Çanakkale Vocational School of Social Sciences
- Çanakkale Vocational School of Technical Sciences
- Çanakkale Vocational School of Marine Technologies
- Biga Vocational School
- Gelibolu Vocational School (Gallipoli)
- Lapseki Vocational School
- Yenice Vocational School
- Çan Vocational School
- Ayvacık Vocational School
- Bayramiç Vocational School
- Ezine Vocational School
- Gökçeada Vocational School
- Bozcada Vocational School Branch
- Eceabat Vocational School Branch

== Campuses ==
- Terzioğlu Campus (Main Campus, Southern Çanakkale)
- Anafartalar Campus (Faculty of Education etc., City centre)
- Dardanos Campus (Dardanelles town)
- Ulupinar Campus (Observatory)
- İskele (Peer) Campus (Old Rectorate)
- Biga Ağaköy Campus (Biga) & Biga Campus 2
- Gökçeada Campus
- Çan Campus
- Gelibolu Campus (Gallipoli)
- Ezine Campus
- Yenice Campus
- Bayramiç Campus
- Lapseki Campus
- Ayvacık Campus
- Kepez Medical Campus
- Eceabat Campus
- Hamzakoy Campus (Gallipoli)
- Bozcada Campus

=== Main Campus (Terzioğlu) ===
Main campus (Terzioğlu Campus) is located in between Çanakkale and Kepez on the upper bank of the Bursa-İzmir highway. The campus is also known as the Terzioğlu Campus or Terzioğlu Hill.

In this campus, the following schools are located: The Senate House, Rectorate (A and B Blocks), Faculty of Medicine, Faculty of Agriculture, Faculty of Marine Sciences and Technologies, Faculty of Engineering, Faculty of Arts and Sciences, Faculty of Political Sciences, Institute of Social Sciences, Institute of Medical Sciences, Institute of Science, School of Health, School of Foreign Languages, Vocational School of Social and Technical Sciences, School of Sports and Sports Halls, Faculty of Fine Arts, Faculty of Divinity, Faculty of Communication and Journalism, the Main Library (ÇOMÜ Library), social areas, student accommodation offices and dormitories, Student Union, mosque, University Radio etc.

=== The Anafartalar Campus ===
The Anafartalar Campus is the founding campus of ÇOMÜ. It is located in the Cevatpaşa District. The Faculty of Education, The Institute of Education, Süleyman Demirel Conference Hall and the ÇOMÜ Sport Hall are housed here.

=== The Dardanos Campus ===
The Dardanos Campus is located in Dardanos (Dardanelles) historical town. The campus includes social sites, swimming poll, application hotel of the university, restaurants, football pitch, sports hall, tennis court, university beach, sailing clup, agriculture gardens, accommodation area, playing grounds etc. The campus is about 8 km to the city centre.

=== The Kepez Campus ===
It is located in Kepez town. The campus is the house of the Medicine School Hospital and related medical research facilities.

=== The Ulupınar Campus ===
The Ulupınar Campus is situated close to the Ulupınar village about 10 km to the Terzioğlu Main Campus of the university and is home to the Ulupınar Observatory and Space Research Centre.

== The University Library ==
ÇOMÜ's library facilities are spread across its three campuses. The collections encompass over 520,000 printed books, as well as thousands of journals and electronic resources.

The ÇOMÜ Library or the main research library of the University of Çanakkale Onsekiz Mart, is one of the oldest libraries in Southern Marmara, Turkey and the first in size in the Southern and the Western Marmara region. The library is at the centre of the main campus and owns a collection of 690,000 books (520,000 of them are printed). The ÇOMÜ Library is a 7/24 library, open 365 days a year including holidays.

=== Main Library in Terzioğlu Campus ===
The Main Library is ÇOMÜ's largest library and is housed in the Terzioğlu Campus near the Rectorate Building. It is home to the books and journals of the Schools of Letter and Sciences, Engineering, Marine Sciences, Administrative and Political Sciences, Divinity, Arts, Humanities. It also houses the Special Collections and rare books.

=== Other libraries ===
- The Biga Library in Ağaköy Campus houses a collection of over 60,000 printed works as well as thousands of slides, sound recordings and some manuscript material.
- The Anafartalar Library in Anafartalar Campus houses a collection of over 5,000 books on education.
- College libraries: Each college and schools in the towns also have their own libraries.

== International Relations Office ==
The ÇOMÜ International Relations Office coordinates activities with an international dimension; assists incoming/outgoing students and staff with all necessary procedures and provides support during the preparation and administration of the projects.

== Student life ==
For the 2020–21 academic year, ÇOMÜ had a total full-time student body of 48,772. 30,073 undergraduate students (13,602 out of them are on two-years programs) and 5,098 postgraduates. Students currently come from 68 countries around the world and study a wide range of subjects.

Imperial's male to female ratio for undergraduate students is almost 1:1 ratio.

ÇOMÜ Student Union or Student Council is part of the ÇOMÜ Senato and the head of the council is elected by the ÇOMÜ students.

Sports facilities at Çanakkale city campuses include three gyms, one swimming pool and three sports halls. The university has its own beach in the Dardanelles Campus 6 km from the Main Campus. The Dardanelles Campus has a football pitch, a tennis court, two basketball court a sports hall.

== Student media ==
ÇOMÜ Kampüs FM was founded in March 2012. 94:00 FM. ÇOMÜ FM is an internet radio and run by the university students.

Students at the University of Çanakkale Onsekiz Mart run over 220 clubs and organizations. These include social, athletic, cultural and religious groups, academic clubs and teams, and common-interest organizations.

== See also ==
- COMU Hospital, affiliated research and teaching hospital
