= Mehmed Şevket Eygi =

Turkish journalist (1933–2019)

- Born: February 7, 1933; Ereğli, Turkey
- Died: July 12, 2019 (aged 86); Istanbul
- Education: Ankara University
- Occupations: Journalist, writer, columnist

Mehmed Şevket Eygi (February 7, 1933 – July 12, 2019) was a Turkish journalist, writer, columnist, conspiracy theorist, and Holocaust denier. Ideologically an Islamist and anti-communist, his columns have allegedly led to Bloody Sunday in 1969. He was imprisoned for many years, including for demagoguery in 2002 and 2006.

== Biography ==
Eygi was born on February 7, 1933, in the Ereğli district of Zonguldak as the only child of his family. He completed his primary, secondary, and high school education in Galatasaray High School. He learned French at Galatasaray High School. He received his bachelor's degree from the Faculty of Political Science of Ankara University in 1952. While attending university, he worked as a translator at the French Cultural Center in Ankara.

After graduating from university in 1956, he worked as a translator at the Directorate of Religious Affairs for two years. After this, he worked as the private secretary of Ömer Nasuhi Bilmen. Eygi began publishing the daily Bugün newspaper in 1966. In February 1969, he called for jihad against communists protesting the docking of the U.S. Sixth Fleet in Istanbul. This resulted in the "Bloody Sunday" attack in which two people were killed and 200 people were injured.

Before dying, he donated over 45,000 books to the Presidential Library.

Eygi died in the Istanbul Hospital where he was treated for heart disease on July 12, 2019. He was buried in Merkezefendi Cemetery following funeral prayers at Fatih Mosque on July 13, 2019. Attendees of his burial ceremony included Recep Tayyip Erdoğan (President at the time), Abdulhamit Gül (Minister of Justice at the time), Mustafa Varank (Minister of Industry and Technology at the time), and Temel Karamollaoğlu (chairperson of the Felicity Party at the time).

== Ideology ==
Eygi is described by H. Esra Arcan as "a renowned Islamist who [wrote] on religious and political subjects". He favoured a political system based on the Sharia, and demanded the rejection of laws that are incompatible with the Quran. Eygi was a Holocaust denier who argued that criminalising Holocaust denial is both a human rights violation and against the freedom of speech principle. Eygi propagated the conspiracy theory that, the English and the Americans have faked the Holocaust by killing millions of German civilists and soldiers.

Ozan Ekin Gökşin argues that, "rightists such as Mehmet Şevket Eygi (…) were the standard bearers" of the conspiracy theory that, "the cadres who founded the Turkish Republic consisted of the elite of Thessaloniki immigrants who converted from Judaism to Islam, but who secretly performed their own religious rituals." Rıfat Bali outlines that, Eygi spread the conspiracy theory that the group of the Dönme Jews were responsible for the Armenian Genocide, and that Eygi believed that "it wasn't the Muslim Turks who committed [atrocities against the Armenians]". Furthermore, Bali describes Mehmed Şevket Eygi as one of those "political players" and "propagandists" that were responsible for "establishing antisemitism" in post-1946 Turkey. The German Interior Ministry also considered Eygi to be an anti-Semite, who had been spreading the "Dönme Delusions" conspiracy theory since the 1960s. The German Amadeu Antonio Foundation called Eygi's 1999 book Yahudi Türkler yahut Sabetaycılar an "anti-Semitic conspiracy theory book".

He propagated the conspiracy theory that "[t]here are more than one million Crypto Jews in Turkey", with "some of them" being "Crypto Kurds, Kurdish Jews". In addition to that, Eygi believed that "there are more than one million Crypto Christians in [Turkey]". In his 2005 article "State, Law, Civil Society and Islam in Contemporary Turkey", İhsan Yılmaz describes that, Eygi also spread Papacy conspiracy theories. He argues that "Whatever topic Eygi [wrote] about in his column, he (…) somewhat fiercely [alleged] that some groups are the secret agents of the Papacy in Turkey." On February 16, 1969, Eygi published an article in the Bugün newspaper entitled "Get Ready for Jihad" in which he claims that a "total war between Muslims and red infidels has become inevitable". Mustafa Yalçıner writes that Eygi is a "Bloody Sunday Instigator". According to Yalçıner, Eygi called upon the Muslim population to fight back against the "red infidels" with their own weapons, which, according to Eygi, were stones, sticks, iron bars, and home-made incendiary grenades. Eygi denied having anything to do with the event.

Eygi wrote that "the mission of the PKK is to break Turkey to pieces, to separate Turkey. Do they want to form a Kurdistan? No! They want to form a United Armenia, a Greater Israel, and Christianised Anatolia". He stated that the PKK's entire leadership, and over 80% of their fighters, are crypto Jews rather than Kurds.

Eygi was fiercely critical of Fethullah Gülen and the Gülen movement, and wrote much about what he believed their intentions were and which danger he believed they posed to the wellbeing of Turkey. He was threatened by members of the group on many occasions.

Eygi was also generally critical of the Presidency of Religious Affairs (Diyanet) and the subjects it delivered on Friday prayer sermons.
