= Çanakkale Onsekiz Mart University Hospital =

Geography
- Location: Kepez, Western Marmara, Çanakkale, Turkey
- Coordinates: 40.115895°N 26.413345°E (approximate)

Organisation
- Type: University hospital
- Affiliated university: Çanakkale Onsekiz Mart University

Services
- Emergency department: Yes (acute, subacute and ambulatory care)
- Beds: 160

History
- Founded: 2000

Links
- Website: hastane.comu.edu.tr
- Lists: Hospitals in Turkey

Çanakkale Onsekiz Mart University Hospital is a teaching hospital in the Western Marmara region of Turkey. It serves the area of north Aegean and South-West Marmara regions, with the current president and chief executive officer as Dr. Murat Coşar. The hospital is a 160-bed facility that provides patients with a complete range of primary and specialty care services.

The hospital is owned and operated by the Çanakkale Onsekiz Mart University (ÇOMÜ) Faculty of Medicine. The university hospital has one of the busiest emergency departments in Turkey.

The COMU Hospital is staffed by 160 full-time attending physicians 124 of them are also faculty members of the COMÜ Faculty of Medicine. The University Hospital has more than 5,000 admissions, 2,500 births, and 215,000 outpatient visits annually.

== History ==
The hospital was established in 2007 in Kepez district as the teaching and research hospital for the university of Çanakkale Onsekiz Mart School of Medicine. The rapid growth of the area led the hospital to continue to expand to some surrounding medical buildings. In 2012 the Nedime Hanim Site was added to the hospital network. The new and bigger hospital buildings with 300-bed facility are also under construction. The new medical site is planned in the main campus of the university.

== Statistics ==
- Beds: 160
- Full-Time Employees: 520
- Active Medical Staff: 280
- Lecturer Medical Staff: 124
- Admissions: 5,000
- Average Length of Stay: 5
- Emergency Room Visits: 3.500
- Trauma Patients: 850
- Surgeries:
- Million Annual Budget (approximately): 35 million Turkish liras

== Programs, Services and Clinics ==
=== Programs & Services ===
- Accident and Emergency (Emergency Department)
- Post Graduate Medical Centre
- Allergy
- Anaesthesia
- Andrology
- Audiology
- Back Pain Service
- Biochemistry & Immunology
- Blood Service
- Bone (Metabolic) Unit & Bone Density Unit
- Breast Unit
- Breathlessness Intervention Service
- Eye Unit
- Health at Work Service
- Heart Clinic
- IVF
- Cancer
- Cardiac Rehabilitation Service
- Cardiology (Heart)
- Cataract Clinic
- Child Development Centre
- Children's Eye Service (Paediatric Ophthalmology)
- Children's Services (Paediatrics)
- Chronic obstructive pulmonary disease (COPD) - Co-creating Health
- Chronic Pain Service
- Clinical Immunology
- Clinical Investigation Ward
- Clinical Pharmacology
- Clinical Research Facility
- Colorectal Unit
- Colposcopy
- Critical Care Outreach
- Co-creating Health
- Community Midwifery Team
- Core Biochemical Assay Laboratory (CBAL)
- Cytogenetics & Molecular Genetics Laboratory
- Cytology - Cervical/Diagnostic
- Day Surgery
- Delivery Unit
- Department of Medicine for the Elderly (DME)
- Dermatology (Skin)
- Diabetes
- Dialysis
- Dietetics
- Disablement Service Centre
- Elderly Medicine
- Emergency Department
- Endocrinology
- Endoscopy
- ENT (Ear, Nose and Throat)
- Epilepsy services
- Eye Unit
- Eye Department (Ophthalmology)
- Familial gastric cancer study
- Gastroenterology
- Gastroenterology, Hepatology and Nutrition (Paediatric)
- Genetics
- Genetics laboratories
- Genitourinary Medicine (GUM) and Sexual Health Advice Centre (SHAC)
- Gynaecology
- Gynaecological Oncology
- Haematological Laboratories
- Haemophilia Centre
- Hepato-Pancreato-Biliary Cancer Service
- Hereditary Diffuse Gastric Cancer (HDGC) study
- Histopathology
- Immunology
- Immunology Laboratories
- Infection control
- Infectious Diseases
- Intensive Care Unit (ICU)
- Intermediate Dependency Area
- Kidney (Renal)
- Psychiatry Service
- Low vision advice and liaison service
- Lung Function Unit
- Lupus & Vasculitis
- Lysosomal Disorders
- Major trauma centre
- Maternity Services
- Maxillofacial Surgery
- Medical Physics and Clinical Engineering
- Melanoma support group
- Mental Health
- Metabolic Bone Disease
- Microbiology & Virology
- Molecular Genetics
- Molecular Malignancy Laboratory
- Neonatal Services
- Nephrology (Renal/kidney)
- Neuro Critical Care Unit
- Neurosciences (Brain and Nerves)
- Neurotology & Skull Base Surgery Unit
- Nuclear Medicine
- Nutrition and Dietetics
- Obesity
- Occupational Health
- Occupational Therapy
- Oncology (Cancer)
- Ophthalmology (Eye Department)
- Oral & Maxillofacial Surgery (Mouth & Face)
- Orthodontics
- Otolaryngology (Ear, Nose & Throat)
- Otology (Ear)
- Outpatient physiotherapy
- Paediatrics (Children's Services)
- Paediatric Gastroenterology, Hepatology and Nutrition
- Paediatric Intensive Care Unit
- Pain Service
- Palliative care
- Patient Advice and Liaison Service (PALS)
- Pathology
- Pharmacy
- Phlebotomy Service (Blood)
- Physiotherapy
- Planned Short Stay Unit
- Plastic Surgery
- Pleural Service
- Porphyria
- Post Graduate Medical Centre
- Pre-assessment
- Prenatal & Neonatal Screening
- Psychiatry - Cambridgeshire and Peterborough Mental Health Partnership NHS Trust
- Radiology
- Radiotherapy
- Rehabilitation Medicine
- Renal (Nephrology)
- Renal Genetics & Tubular Disorders Clinic
- Respiratory Medicine
- Rheumatology
- Severe Insulin Resistance Service
- Skin cancer service
- Speech and Language Therapy
- Thoracic Unit
- Thrombosis Treatment Team
- Tissue Typing
- Trauma and Orthopaedics
- Transplant
- Upper Gastrointestinal (GI) Unit
- Urology (Urinary Tract)
- Vascular Surgery
- Vasculitis and lupus service
- Virology & Microbiology
- Ward information
- Wellcome Trust Clinical Research Facility (CRF)
- Women's Services

=== Clinics ===
- Children's Outpatients
- Dermatology / Plastic Surgery
- Diabetes and Endocrine Clinic
- Ear, Nose & Throat (ENT)
- Eye Clinic
- Gastroenterology, Neurosciences, Infectious Medicine, Hepatology, Renal
- General Surgery
- Genito-Urinary medicine
- Heart
- Medical, Cardiology & Elderly (DME)
- Mental Health
- Respiratory (Chest), Allergy & Immunology
- Rheumatology
- Oral & Maxillofacial Surgery and Orthodontics
- Orthopaedics & Trauma
- Trauma & Orthopaedics
- Urology

== Kepez site ==
The main building (Kepez Campus) is located at main street in Kepez Square. It was opened in 2007 by the permission of the Turkish National Health Ministry. The hospital underwent an expansion in the 2011 and work was completed with additional bed spaces in early 2012.

The ÇOMÜ Hospital is a primary multi-care facility (open 24 hours) in its area, an Academic community hospital.

== Nedime Hanım campus ==
The Nedime Hanım campus is located at Nedime Hanım Square, Old City.

== The Emergency Service (Department) ==
The hospital's Emergency Service operates 24-hours a day, 365 days a year. It is based at Kepez Site. The Emergency Service serves the local population of Çanakkale province as well as adjoining parts of Balıkesir and surrounding area.

== See also ==
- List of hospitals in Turkey
