= Tahtakuşlar Ethnography Museum =

Private museum in Turkey

- Tahtakuşlar Etnoğrafya Müzesi
- Tahtakuşlar Museum
- Established: 1991; 35 years ago
- Location: Tahtakuşlar köyü, Edremit, Turkey
- Coordinates: 39°35′28″N 26°51′30″E
- Type: Ethnography
- Owner: Alibey Kudar

Tahtakuşlar Ethnography Museum (Turkish: Tahtakuşlar Etnografya Müzesi) is a private museum in Balıkesir Province, Turkey devoted to the lifestyle of villagers of Oghuz Turks origin.

Tahtakuşlar is a village in Edremit ilçe (district) of Balıkesir Province. The area around the village is a part of Kazdağı (i.e., Ida Mountains of the Antiquity) The museum is situated to south east of village at 39°35′28″N 26°51′30″E. The visitors follow İzmir-Çanakkale highway D.550 up to the town of Güre. The museum is situated just 1.5 km (0.93 mi) from Güre.

The museum was founded on 10 June 1991 by Alibey Kudar, a retired primary school teacher. The population of the village is composed of Oghuz Turks, who are locally known as Tahtacı, and the museum is devoted to Tahtacı culture. Some of the exhibited items are household furniture, local attire, rugs, tents, amulets, ornament, etc. Although it is an ethnography museum, a gigantic sea turtle’s shell of 197 cm (78 in) is also on display. The art gallery of painter and sculptor Selim Turan was added to the local collection in 1992, and a library was established within the museum in 1994.
