= Beyazıt State Library =

National library of the Ottoman Empire

- Beyazıt Devlet Kütüphanesi
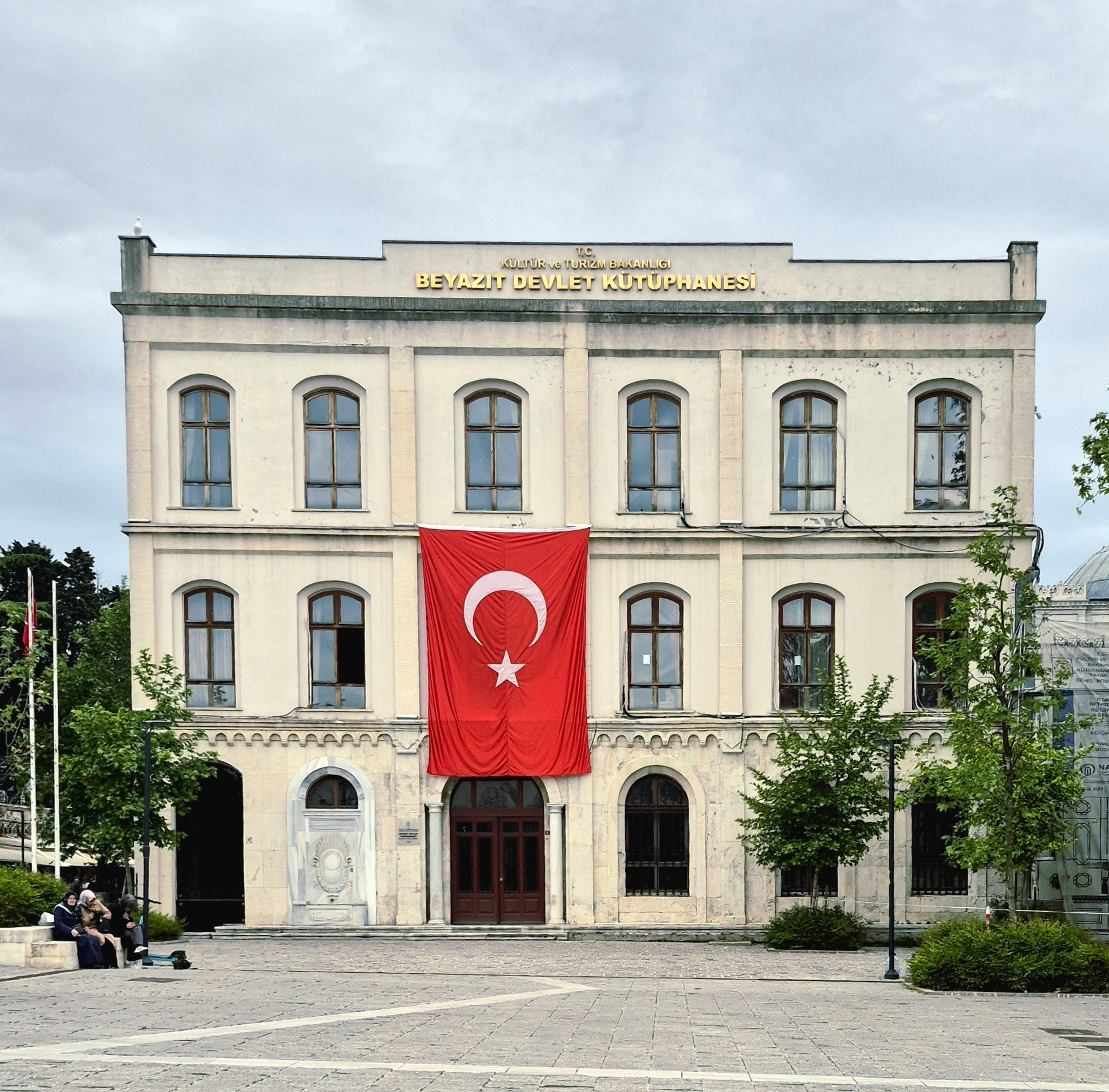
- Beyazıt State Library, 2025
- 41.01166098969528°N 28.966686001290565°E
- Location: Beyazıt, Çadırcılar Cd. No:4, 34126 Fatih, Istanbul, Turkey, Turkey
- Type: National library
- Established: 24 June 1884; 141 years ago
- Architect: Tabanlıoğlu Architects
- Reference to legal mandate: Decree of Abdülhamid II, sultan of the Ottoman Empire authorizing the Statute of the Ottoman Public Library, the National Library of the Ottoman (24 June 1884)
- Service area: Turkey

Collection
- Items collected: Ottoman periodicals, newspapers, magazines, journals

Other information
- Director: Abdülkadir Öztuğrul
- Affiliation: Ministry of Culture and Tourism
- Website: istanbulbeyazitdevlet.kutuphane.gov.tr

Beyazıt State Library (Turkish: Beyazıt Devlet Kütüphanesi; formerly known as the Ottoman Public Library) is a book depositary and digital library in Istanbul. One of Turkey's oldest libraries, it is the first national library of Ottoman manuscripts and one of the country's six legal deposit libraries.

The library houses Ottoman periodicals, newspapers, magazines and other historical records. In all it contains 1.5 million published materials – 900,000 books, 65,000 postcards, maps, cinema posters, 33,000 different magazines and more than 5,000 audiobooks. It was visited by nearly 140,000 readers in 2018 and hosted more than 67,000 readers in the first six months of 2019.

It covers an area of about 3,000 square meters (0.74 acres) on the eastern side of Beyazıt Square.

== History ==
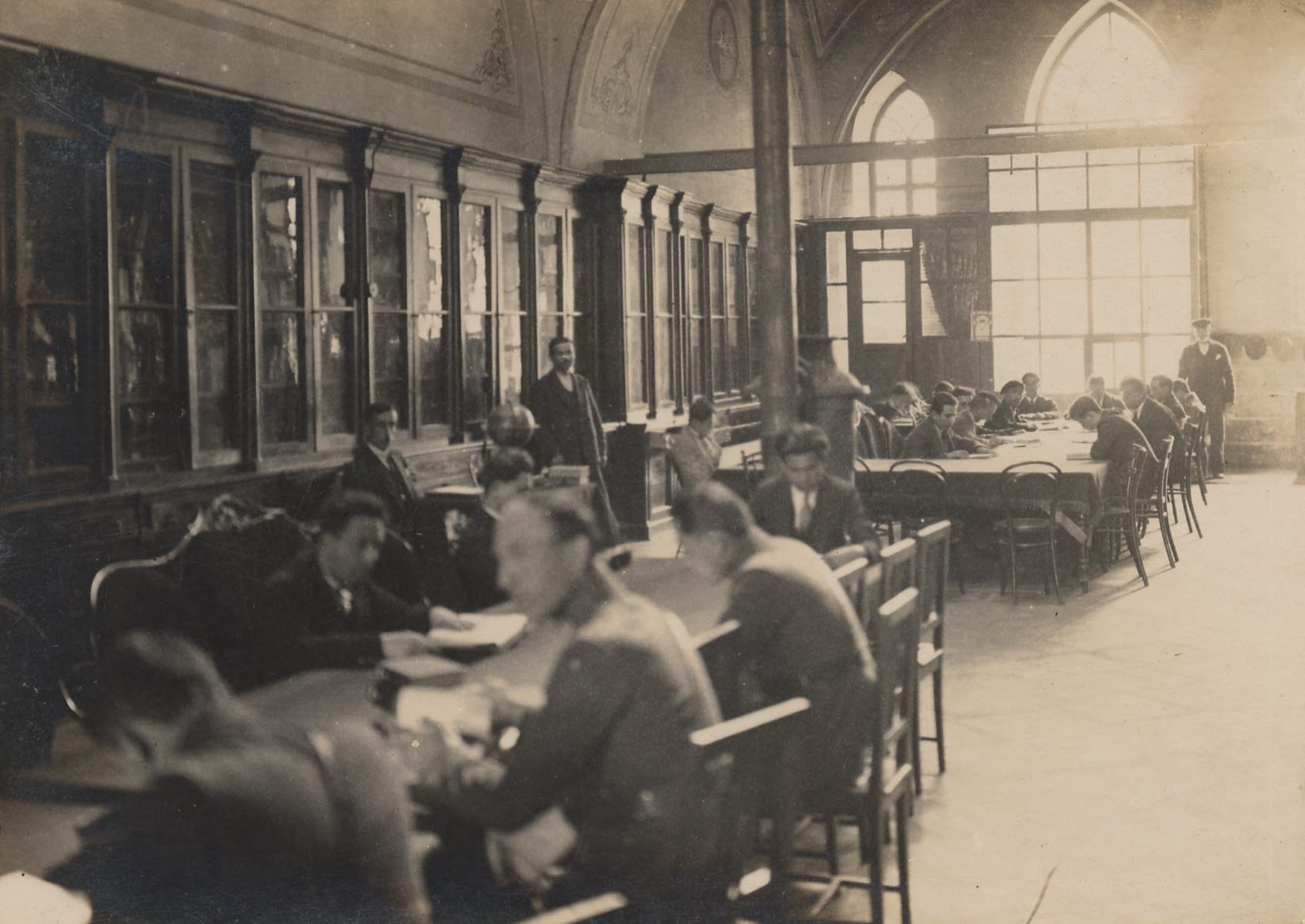
Old Reading Room of Beyazıt State Library

On 24 June 1884, Sultan Abdülhamid II converted the soup kitchen of the Beyazıt Mosque into a public library, originally called the Kütüphane-i Umumi-i Osmani. The sultan worked with a carpenter to design the library's towering dark-wood book cabinets himself.

In 1934 Mustafa Kemal Atatürk ordered that a copy of every published material should be stored in the Beyazıt State Library. To enable this, the building was expanded in 1948 and again in 1953. Its service areas were also expanded and a building of the Faculty of Dentistry of Istanbul University (built between 1867 and 1876) was also donated to the library while Muzaffer Gökman was its director.

In 1961 the Seventh Council of Higher Education formally changed its named to Beyazıt State Library.

The Library's contents were transferred from other libraries, purchased or donated. Some books were donated by the Beyazıt Mosque since the library originally formed part of the mosque complex. It is regarded as a pioneering library since it introduced the first-ever bookbinding workshops and children's library as well as the first modern library cataloguing system in Turkey. It holds a record for having archived 1.2 million books since its opening.

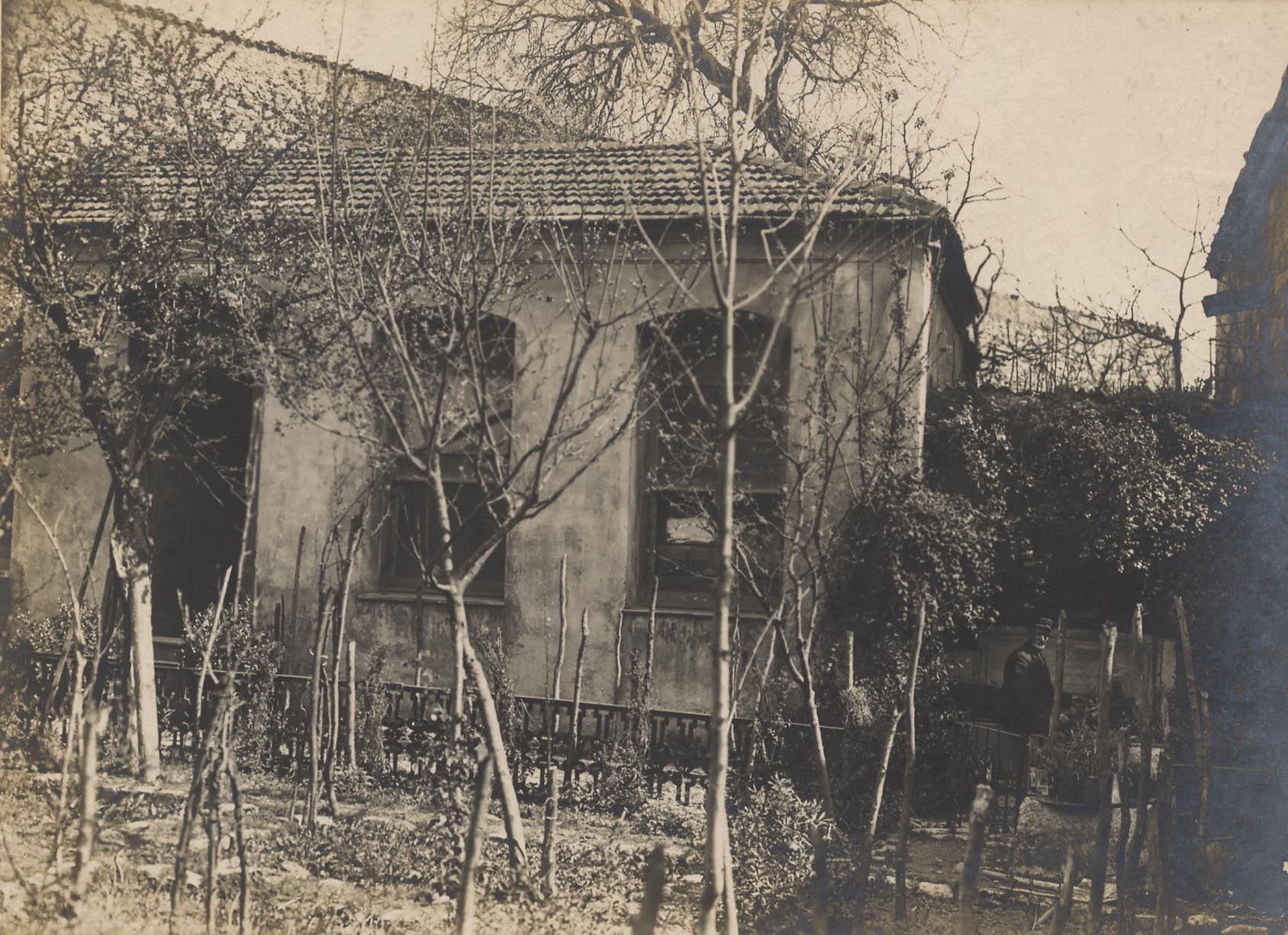
Old building of Beyazıt State Library

The 1999 İzmit earthquake left cracks in the walls, requiring repair and the government of Turkey commissioned Tabanlıoğlu Architects to reconstruct it in 2016. The completion of the project cost $2 million with funds donated by the Aydin Dogan Foundation. In 2020 the restored Beyazıt State Library featured in The Daily Beast's article The World's Most Beautiful Libraries.

== Contents ==
When the Library was established, it acquired publications taken from 500 different libraries including the private libraries of state bureaucrats, palace officials, medrese teachers and mosques. The Library also contains an early Quranic manuscript written on golden leaf, and the Arabic language and grammar book entitled the Kitabü'l-Me'sur which was written in 893 AD. Other titles include the History of the West Indies, which was written in 1580, and the Kitab-ı İklim-i Cedid (Tarih-i Hind-i Garbi) about the Americas.

As of 2020, the Library has digitalised about 50,000 volumes – 13,000 handwritten books and 37,000 printed materials.

=== Audiobooks ===
As Turkey's first national library, the Beyazıt State Library uses modern technology to make publications accessible to students and researchers around the clock. It also became the first library in the country to produce audiobooks for visually impaired people. In 2020, an estimated 500 visually impaired people were making use of these audiobooks.

== Awards and accolades ==
Beyazit State Library was nominated for the European Union Prize for Contemporary Architecture – Mies van der Rohe Award in 2017. It was also nominated for the Aga Khan Award for Architecture in 2019 for the redesign of a historic structure by Tabanlıoğlu Architects.

The Royal Institute of British Architects (RIBA) nominated Beyazıt State Library as a contender for a 'best new building of 2017' award in competition with 61 other projects. In 2016 it became the recipient of the World Architecture Festival award for its architectural structure.

It also won the LEAF Award – Hospitality Building of the Year (Future) in 2017 and MIPIM award in the same year.
