= Bloody Sunday (1969) =

Political demonstration in Istanbul, Turkey

Coverage in the Hürriyet of the attack. Kanlı Pazar translates as "Bloody Sunday".

Bloody Sunday (Turkish: Kanlı Pazar) refers to a violent confrontation on 16 February 1969 in Istanbul, Turkey, when right-wing counter-demonstrators attacked a left-wing protest march at Taksim Square, killing two people and injuring over 200.

Seventy-six youth organizations, supported by labor unions and the Workers' Party of Turkey, had assembled in Beyazıt Square for a march they called the "Mustafa Kemal March Against Imperialism", protesting the visit of the United States Sixth Fleet to Istanbul. The march had received official permission from the Istanbul governorate. Tens of thousands of demonstrators marched from Beyazıt through Sultanahmet, Sirkeci, Eminönü, Karaköy, and Dolmabahçe towards Taksim Square. Meanwhile, right-wing groups who had been called to confront the marchers assembled at Taksim Square after prayers, armed with sticks, stones, and knives. Police allowed the marchers to enter the square only in small groups; the right-wing attackers easily broke through the thin police cordon of just two rows and attacked the demonstrators, chanting religious slogans and anti-communist slogans. Two protesters, Ali Turgut Aytaç and Duran Erdoğan, were stabbed to death, and over 200 were injured.

== Background ==
A coup d'état in 1960 had brought a group of military officers to power in Turkey. In the following years, labor tensions grew and anti-American sentiment intensified. Elements of the Turkish left and labor movement protested against what they regarded as American imperialism.

Protests increased after the United States Sixth Fleet visited Turkey. In İzmir and Trabzon, right-wing groups had already attacked earlier Sixth Fleet protest demonstrations, injuring 130 people. On 14 February, after Friday prayers, the Association for Combating Communism (Komünizmle Mücadele Derneği) and the right-wing-controlled National Turkish Student Union organized a "Respect for the Flag" rally. At this rally, they declared war on communists and called on supporters to gather at Taksim Square two days later to confront the planned left-wing march.

The historian Feroz Ahmad, a specialist in modern Turkish history, described Bloody Sunday as "an example of organized, fascist violence", referring to the right-wing elements responsible for most of the violence.

== Aftermath ==
The day after the attack, Hürriyet published a photograph showing Ali Turgut Aytaç being stabbed while a riot police officer stood by and watched, provoking widespread public outrage. All political parties except the ruling Justice Party demanded the resignation of Interior Minister Faruk Sükan. Sükan blamed left-wing students for the violence and stated that police had performed their duties normally. Although Justice Party senator Mahmut Vural requested a parliamentary debate on the incident, only a limited investigation was conducted.

Political tensions between the right and the left in Turkey continued throughout the 1970s. Similar attacks on labor groups by right-wing elements occurred during the 1971 military intervention and again in 1977. The 1977 Taksim Square massacre is sometimes referred to as Turkey's "second Bloody Sunday".

== See also ==
- June 15-16 events (Turkey)
- Taksim Square massacre
- Politics of Turkey
