= Abdülbaki Gölpınarlı =

Turkish Sufi scholar and literary historian (1900–1982

- Born: Mustafa İzzet Bâkî; 12 January 1900; Istanbul
- Died: 25 August 1982 (aged 82); Istanbul
- Known for: Literary historian

Abdülbaki Gölpınarlı (12 January 1900 – 25 August 1982) was a Turkish literary historian, translator, and educator of Azerbaijani descent, known for his works on Iranian literature and Sufism. Considered "one of the greatest scholars of Turkish Sufism", Gölpınarlı was a prominent interpreter of various tariqas—particularly the Mawlaviyya and Bektashiyya orders.

== Early life and education ==
Gölpınarlı was born Mustafa İzzet Bâkî in Istanbul on 12 January 1900, and he died in Istanbul 25 August 1982. His father, journalist Ahmed Agah Efendi, was a follower of the Mevlevi Order who worked as an Ottoman civil servant in Rusjuk, Bulgaria, then moved to Istanbul during the Russo-Turkish War of 1877–78. His mother was Aliye Şöhret Hanım. His family was from Gence, Azerbaijan.

After his father's death he worked in bookshop in İstanbul Vezneciler and as a teacher and administrator in Menbâ-i İrfân İptidiari School in Alaca district of Çorum. In 1922 he returned to Istanbul, where he completed his last year in the MFA. He graduated from Istanbul University, Faculty of Literature, Department of Turkish Language and Literature, under the supervision of Köprülüzade Mehmet Fuat Bey. His 1930 thesis was titled Melâmilik and Melâmiler.

== Career ==
As a teacher of literature, he worked in Istanbul's Haydarpaşa High School, and with high schools in Konya, Kayseri, Balıkesir and Kastamonu. He was a Persian language lecturer at Ankara University, on the faculty of Language, History and Geography. After earning his doctorate, he taught Islamic-Turkish Sufism history and literature at Istanbul University. In his Divan Literature Declaration (1945), he controversially criticised Divan literature using an ideological approach. "According to the book's argument, Divan literature was a bad imitation of Iranian literature; he was not interested in social problems. Later, he approached Divan poetry with a softer attitude and prepared it for publication from the structure like Fuzuli Divanı (1948) and 'Nedim Divanı (1951)."

In 1945 he was arrested for allegedly violating Article 142 of the Turkish Criminal Code; after serving 10 months in prison, he was acquitted.

In 1949 he voluntarily retired. He died 25 August 1982.

== Selected publications ==
- Boratav, PN, & Golpinar, A. (1943). Pir Sultan Abdal. Ankara: AÜ DTCF Turkish Language and Literature Institute Publication.
- Gölpinarli, A. (1945). Tabiat ve Divan Edebiyatı. Divan Edebiyatı Beyanındadır, Đstanbul.
- Golpinar, A. (1950). The Organization and Sources of Futuvet in Islamic and Turkish Provinces. Istanbul University Faculty of Economics Journal,11,1-4.
- Gölpınarlı, A. (1951). Mevlânâ Celaleddin.
- Golpinar, A. (1952). The organization and its sources in the Islamic and Turkish provinces . Istanbul University.
- Gölpınarlı, A. (1953). After Mevlânâ Mevlevilik.
- Gölpınarlı, A. (1953). Kaygusuz Abdal-Hatayi-Kul Himmet.
- Gölpınarlı, A. (1953). Nesi-mî-Usulî-Ruhî.
- Gölpınarlı, A. (1954–55, 4 books) Divan Poetry.
- Gölpınarlı, A. (1955) Qur'an and Translation.
- Gölpinarli, A. (1956). "Rumi and a justified wish" (PDF). earsiv.sehir.edu.tr.
- Gölpinarli, A. (1958). The Twelve Imams.
- Rumi, MCI (1959). Divân-ı Kebîr (trans. Abdülbaki Gölpınarlı).
- Rumi, FI (1958). Vilâyet-nâme Menâkıb-ı Hacı Bektâş-ı Velî, nşr. Abdulbaki Golpinarli, Istanbul.
- Gölpinarli, A. (1961). Nasreddin Hoca
- Gölpinarli, A. (1961). Yunus Emre and Sufism (Sufism).
- Gölpinarli, A. (1963). Mevlevi Adap and Erkanı.
- Gölpinarli, A. (1965). Yunus Emre, Risâlat al-Nushiyye and Divan.
- Rumi, MC (1965). Mevlânâ, Mecallis-i Seb'a: Seven Houses (trans. Abdülbaki Gölpınarlı).
- Golpinar, A. (1966). Shaykh Theoday Shaykh Bedreddin . Meat.
- Gölpinarli, A. (1966). Sheikh Bedreddin, son of the Simavna Kadı.
- Gölpinarli, A. (1969). Hz. Muhammad and Islam.
- Gölpinarli, A. (1969). 100 Cults and Sects in Turkey in Question.
- Gölpinarli, A. (1969). Sufism in 100 questions (Vol. 14). Real Publisher.
- Gölpinarli, A. (Ed.). (1972). Anthology of Turkish Sufi poetry. National publications.
- Golpinar, A. (1973). The catalog of Hurûfî texts (No. 6). Turkish Historical Society Printing House.
- Gölpinarli, A. (1973). Hayyam and Rubai.
- Gölpinarli, A. (1978). Idioms and Proverbs Translating from Sufism to Our Language.
- Golpinar, A. (1979). Islamic sects and Shi'ism throughout history (Vol. 6). Der Publishing House.
- Gölpınarlı, Abdülbaki (August 13, 2015). "Burgazi ve 'Fütüvvetname'si". İstanbul Üniversitesi İktisat Fakültesi Mecmuası (in Turkish). 15 (1–4): 0. ISSN 1304-0235.
