= Recep Tayyip Erdoğan University =

Turkish public university located in Rize, Turkey

- Recep Tayyip Erdoğan Üniversitesi
- University emblem
- Latin: Universitas Recep Tayyip Erdoğan
- Former names: Rize University (2006–2012)
- Type: Public
- Established: 17 March 2006
- Rector: Prof. Dr. Yusuf Yılmaz
- Students: 15,421 (2023–24)
- Location: Rize, Turkey
- Campus: Zihni Derin Campus (main)
- Colours: Turquoise
- Affiliations: Kafkasya University Association, European University Association
- Website: www.erdogan.edu.tr

Recep Tayyip Erdoğan University (RTEÜ, formerly Rize University) is a public university located in Rize, Turkey. It was established in 2006 following the separation from Karadeniz Technical University. The university was renamed in 2012 after the 12th President of Turkey, Recep Tayyip Erdoğan.

== History ==
Recep Tayyip Erdoğan University was founded on 17 March 2006 under Law No. 5467. It initially comprised several faculties and vocational schools formerly affiliated with Karadeniz Technical University. The current name was adopted in April 2012.

Over the years, the university has expanded with new faculties and research institutes.

== Academic structure ==
=== Faculties ===
- Faculty of Tourism (Ardeşen)
- Faculty of Dentistry
- Faculty of Pharmacy
- Faculty of Education
- Faculty of Science and Letters
- Faculty of Fine Arts, Design and Architecture
- Faculty of Law
- Faculty of Economics and Administrative Sciences
- Faculty of Theology
- Faculty of Engineering and Architecture
- Faculty of Fisheries
- Faculty of Medicine
- Faculty of Agriculture and Natural Sciences
- Turgut Kıran Maritime Faculty (Derepazarı)

=== Schools ===
- School of Physical Education and Sports
- School of Health
- School of Foreign Languages
- Fındıklı School of Applied Sciences
- Güneysu School of Physical Therapy and Rehabilitation

=== Institutes ===
- Institute of Science
- Institute of Health Sciences
- Institute of Graduate Studies

=== Vocational Schools ===
- Rize Vocational School of Justice
- Rize Vocational School of Health Services
- Rize Vocational School of Social Sciences
- Rize Vocational School of Technical Sciences
- Ardeşen Vocational School
- Fındıklı Vocational School
- Pazar Vocational School

== Students and staff ==
As of 2023–24, the university had 15,421 students and more than 1,000 academic and administrative staff.

== Research and international relations ==
The university is a member of the Caucasus University Association and the European University Association. It maintains various national and international partnerships.

== Campuses ==
The main campus, Zihni Derin Campus, is located about 6 km from Rize city center. Faculties and schools operate at several campuses across the city and province.
