= ÇOMÜ Library =

The ÇOMÜ Library
- 40.145991°N 26.402731°E
- Location: Terzioğlu Campus (main campus), Çanakkale, Turkey, ÇOMÜ, Turkey
- Type: Academic library
- Established: 1992

Collection
- Items collected: books, journals, newspapers, magazines, sound and music recordings, maps, prints, drawings and manuscripts
- Size: Over 620,000 printed items, over 210,000 e-books and over 2,500,000 volume theses. The length of shelves is about 17.4 km

Access and use
- Members: Students and fellows of Çanakkale Onsekiz Mart University

Other information
- Director: Mustafa Şirin (librarian)
- Website: lib.comu.edu.tr

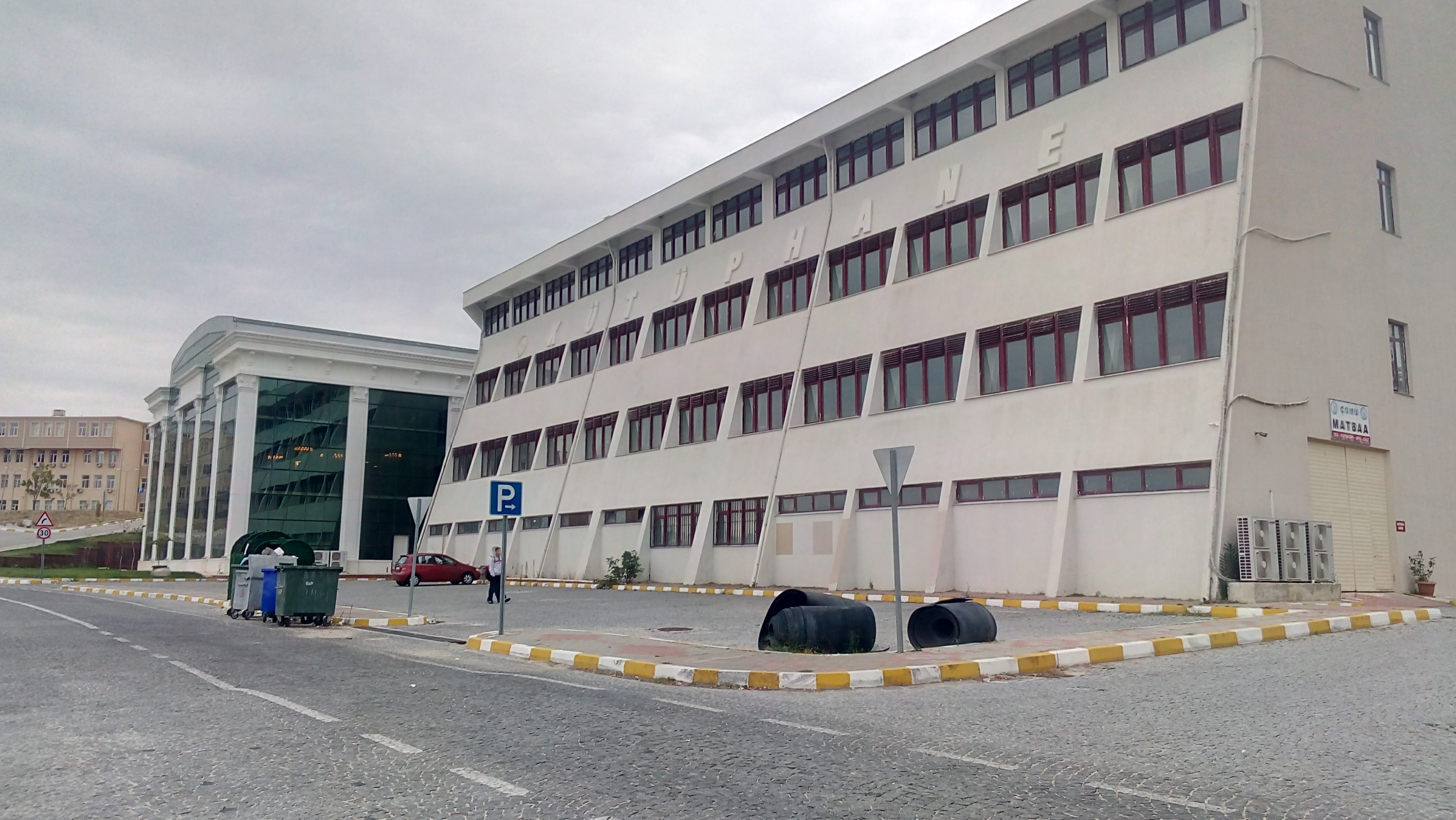
The back facade of Çanakkale Onsekiz Mart University Library

The ÇOMÜ Library, the main research library of the Çanakkale Onsekiz Mart University, is one of the oldest libraries in the southern Marmara region of Turkey and the largest in southern and western Marmara region. The library is at the centre of the main campus. The ÇOMÜ Library is a 24-hour library, open 365 days a year including holidays.

== History ==
ÇOMÜ Library was founded in 1992 in the Anafartalar Campus as the main library of the university.

At the end of 2002 the collection was transferred to the Terzioğlu Campus. The collection at that time was only 50,000 volumes in 2002. The library reached the number of 250,000 printed volumes in size in the end of 2011. The ÇOMÜ Library, apart from over 2 million PhD and MA thesis, has more than 620,000 separate printed books and about 200,000 e-books.

== Infrastructure and facilities ==
=== Main building ===
The main building has 2000 reader places and 120 PC workstations. The library also has working groups hall and foreign language study rooms. The ÇOMÜ Library has also a 300-people conference hall in the ground floor. The building is home of over 620,000 printed books and known as the biggest library in the Aegean Sea Region, Turkey.

=== Anafartalar Library ===
The Anafartalar Library, which is also known as the Education Faculty Library, mainly focuses on educational materials. It has a 50 reader places and about 200 PC workstations.

=== The ÇOMÜ Biga Library ===
It is located in the Agakoy Campus of the university, Biga town. The library building was opened on 17 March 2013 by Turkish Prime Minister Recep Tayyip Erdogan. The ÇOMÜ Biga Library has a 60,000 books-collection which is mainly focused on politics, economics and international relations. The total book capacity of the library is 250,000 volumes. The ÇOMÜ Biga Library is the biggest faculty library in Turkey.

=== The ÇOMÜ Korfmann Archeology Library ===
Housed in a 19th-century former school in the old town, this library, opposite the Tifli Mosque, was the bequest of the late Manfred Osman Korfmann (1945–2005), archaeological director at Troy from 1988 to 2003. It contains more than 20.000 volumes on history, culture, art and archaeology.

== Sites ==
The library occupies a group of two buildings in the main campus of the university. The library includes several off-site storage areas and many other libraries in Çanakkale province:

- Faculty of Medicine Library
- Anafartalar Library, Education
- Faculty of Divinity Library
- Biga Library
- Japanese Library, Japanese Collection in Anafartalar
- Avustralian Studies Centre Library
- History Library
- Local Branches in Gökçeada, Bozcada, Yenice, Çan, Gelibolu (Gallipoli), Lapseki, Biga, Ezine, Ayvacık)
- Music Library
- ÇOMÜ Korfmann Archeology Library.

== IT Services ==
ÇOMÜ library IT Services provides a wide range of services, support and facilities, including high speed network access, high specification PCs and quality help, training and advice. The IT hall is at the lower floor of the Main Library and include about 100 PCs for 7/24 hour unlimited usage.

Apart from the Library IT hall, the ÖSEM IT Centre with its 250 PCs is 150 m away.
