= National Library of Turkey =

Coordinates: 39.9169°N 32.8271°E

- Millî Kütüphane

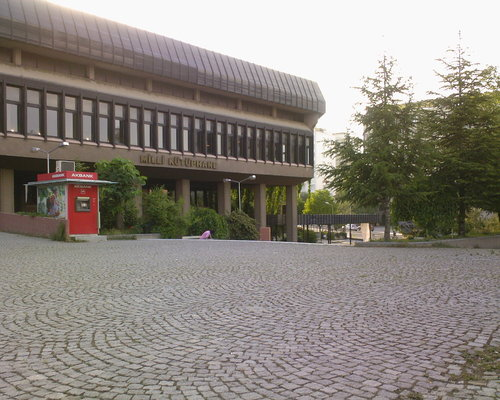
- Location: Bahçelievler, Ankara, Turkey
- Type: National library
- Established: April 15, 1946 (80 years ago)

Collection
- Size: 4M items

Other information
- Website: http://www.millikutuphane.gov.tr/

The National Library of Turkey (Turkish: Millî Kütüphane) is the national library of Turkey, located in Ankara. It was founded on April 15, 1946.

== History ==
The National Library of Turkey, established in the Çankaya district of the city Ankara, was established on April 15, 1946, under the Ministry of Education through the Directorate of Publications. The library initially had 8,000 printed works, but within the first year it had outgrown its original building, and in order to make the collection available to the public it moved to a temporary building on April 1, 1947. Soon the archive's size reached 60,000. It officially started to serve the users on August 16, 1948. The building is now used as the Ankara Provincial Public Library. The National Library gained a separate legal entity independent from the Ministry of National Education through a law adopted by the Grand National Assembly on March 23, 1950. Nine days later, the law came into force and was published on the T.C. Resmi Gazete.

Plans for constructing a new building used for the National Library started in 1965, after realizing that the existing building would not meet the requirements in the future. Construction began in 1973 and was completed on August 5, 1983. Since its completion, the library has served its users in some 39,000 square meters of space.

According to the 1934 Law on Compilation of Printed Articles and Pictures, it is obligatory to send a copy of every work published in the country to the National Library. According to the 2017 data, there are 4,087,909 manuscripts and printed works in the library's archive. According to the statistics of the same year, the number of people benefiting from the National Library, which has 26,478 registered members, is 629,905.

The library is a member of the Conference of European National Librarians (CENL) and Europeana. It is a member of the National Collective Catalog organizations in Turkey.

== Collection ==
The National Library has one of the richest collections in Turkey. As of 2013, the collection consists of 3,089,517 items, which can be categorized as follows:

Number of Books	Number of Books in the Old Orthography	Number of Periodicals	Number of Non-textual Materials	Number of Manuscripts
1,314,683	56,550	1,475,129	215,677	27,478

== See also ==
- List of national libraries
- Presidential Library (Turkey)
- Rami Barracks
