= List of Istanbul landmarks =

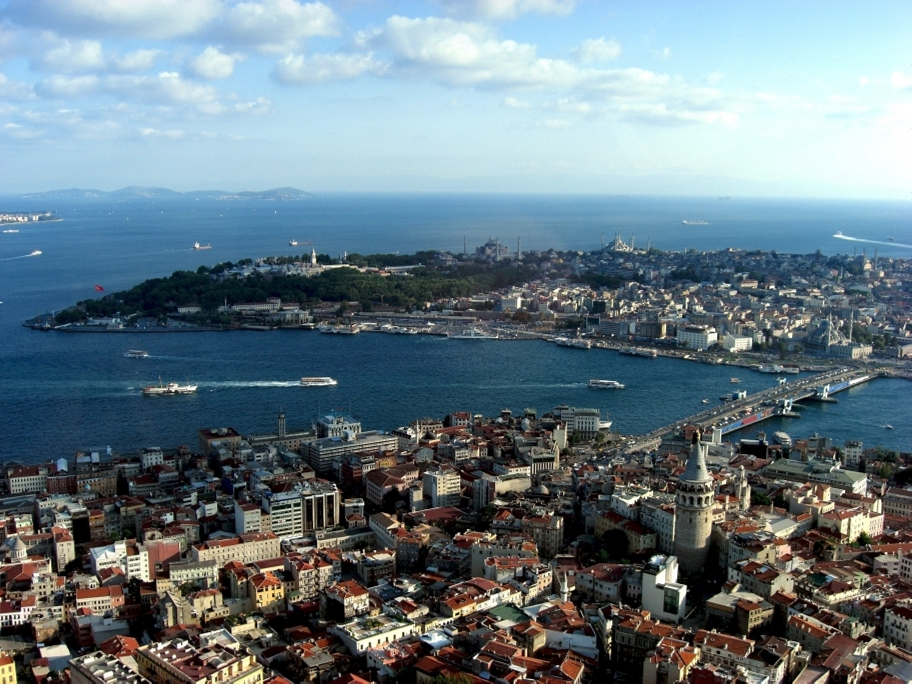
From left to right: The Sultan Ahmed Mosque, Hagia Sophia, the Seraglio Point consisting of the Topkapı Palace and the Sea Walls, and the Galata Tower at far right, across the Golden Horn

There are many landmarks in Istanbul. The historic areas of Istanbul are cited as UNESCO World Heritage Site.

== Attractions ==
=== Buildings, monuments and landmarks ===
- Topkapı Palace
  - Fountain of Ahmed III
- Hippodrome of Constantinople
  - Serpent Column
  - Obelisk of Theodosius
  - Walled Obelisk
  - German Fountain
  - Basilica Cistern
- Milion
- Grand Bazaar
- Spice Bazaar
- Galata Bridge
- Tünel
- Istiklal Avenue
  - Cité de Péra
  - Mısır Apartment
- Pera Palace Hotel
- Republic Monument
- Caferağa Medresseh
- Rumelihisarı
- Anadoluhisarı
- Yedikule Fortress
- Yoros Castle
- Valens Aqueduct
- Walls of Constantinople
- Palace of Blachernae
- Palace of the Porphyrogenitus
- Column of Marcian
- Column of Constantine
- Column of the Goths
- Cistern of Mocius
- Cistern of Aetius
- Cistern of Philoxenos
- Theodosius Cistern
- Cistern of Aspar
- Cistern of the Hebdomon
- Prison of Anemas
- Monastery of Stoudios
- Dolmabahçe Palace
- Çırağan Palace
- Beylerbeyi Palace
- Küçüksu Palace
- Aynalıkavak Palace
- Ihlamur Palace
- Khedive Palace
- Esma Sultan Mansion
- Haydarpaşa Terminal
- Sirkeci Terminal
- Sublime Porte
- Süreyya Opera House

=== Mosques, Churches and Synagogues ===
- Sultanahmet Mosque
- New Mosque
- Ayasofya Mosque
- Eyüp Sultan Mosque
- Fatih Mosque
- Bayezid II Mosque
- Zeyrek Mosque
- Arap Mosque
- Gül Mosque
- Bodrum Mosque
- Vefa Kilise Mosque
- Eski Imaret Mosque
- Fethiye Mosque
- Kalenderhane Mosque
- Fenari Isa Mosque
- Little Hagia Sophia
- Hirami Ahmet Pasha Mosque
- Koca Mustafa Pasha Mosque
- Rum Mehmed Pasha Mosque
- Firuz Ağa Mosque
- Vasat Atik Ali Pasha Mosque
- Gazi Atik Ali Pasha Mosque
- Yavuz Selim Mosque
- Süleymaniye Mosque
- Şehzade Mosque
- Mihrimah Sultan Mosque (Edirnekapı)
- Mihrimah Sultan Mosque (Üsküdar)
- Sokollu Mehmed Pasha Mosque
- Piyale Pasha Mosque
- Rüstem Pasha Mosque
- Şemsi Pasha Mosque
- Atik Valide Mosque
- Molla Çelebi Mosque
- Zal Mahmud Pasha Mosque
- Kılıç Ali Pasha Complex
- Haseki Sultan Complex
- Sinan Pasha Mosque
- Laleli Mosque
- Yeni Valide Mosque
- Nuruosmaniye Mosque
- Zeynep Sultan Mosque
- Teşvikiye Mosque
- Küçük Mecidiye Mosque
- Ortaköy Mosque
- Dolmabahçe Mosque
- Yıldız Hamidiye Mosque
- Pertevniyal Valide Sultan Mosque
- Nusretiye Mosque
- Church of St. Anthony of Padua, Istanbul
- Church of St. Mary Draperis, Istanbul
- Cathedral of the Holy Spirit
- Church of SS Peter and Paul, Istanbul
- Church of Saint Benoit, Istanbul
- Crimea Memorial Church
- Hagia Triada Greek Orthodox Church, Istanbul
- Church of St. Mary of the Mongols
- Ecumenical Patriarchate of Constantinople
- Church of St. George
- Church of St. Mary of the Spring (Istanbul)
- Church of St. Mary of Blachernae (Istanbul)
- Monastery of the Transfiguration, Kinaliada
- Bulgarian St. Stephen Church
- Armenian Patriarchate of Constantinople
- Church of St. George of Samatya
- Neve Shalom Synagogue
- Ashkenazi Synagogue of Istanbul
- Ahrida Synagogue of Istanbul
- Italian Synagogue (Istanbul)

=== Towers ===
Towers in Istanbul

- Beyazıt Tower
- Dolmabahçe Clock Tower
- Endem TV Tower
- Etfal Hospital Clock Tower
- Galata Tower
- Maiden's Tower
- Nusretiye Clock Tower
- Yıldız Clock Tower

=== Museums ===
Museums in Istanbul

- Hagia Irene
- Chora Church
- Istanbul Archaeology Museums
- Great Palace Mosaic Museum
- Turkish and Islamic Arts Museum
- Istanbul Naval Museum
- Istanbul Modern
- Yıldız Palace
- The Museum of Innocence
- Sakıp Sabancı Museum
- Sadberk Hanım Museum
- Rahmi M. Koç Museum
- Rezan Has Museum
- Istanbul Military Museum
- SALT (institution)
- Pera Museum
- SantralIstanbul
- Miniatürk
- Jewish Museum of Turkey
- Tiled Kiosk
- İstanbul Toy Museum
- Istanbul Postal Museum
- Adam Mickiewicz Museum, Istanbul
- Galatasaray Museum
- Istanbul Railway Museum
- Doğançay Museum
- Aşiyan Museum
- Istanbul Aviation Museum
- Museum of Illumination and Heating Appliances
- Florya Atatürk Marine Mansion

=== Bath houses ===
- Haseki Hürrem Sultan Hamamı
- Çemberlitaş Hamamı
- Bayezid II Hamamı
- Cağaloğlu Hamam

=== Parks and gardens ===
- Avcıkoru Nature Park
- Belgrad Forest
- Emirgan Park
- Fethi Paşa Korusu
- Gülhane Park
- Kartal Park
- Miniatürk
- Taksim Gezi Park
- Yıldız Park

=== Schools ===
Schools in Istanbul

- Istanbul University
- Galatasaray High School
- Istanbul High School
- Kabataş Erkek Lisesi
- Kadıköy Anadolu Lisesi
- Cağaloğlu Anadolu Lisesi
- Robert College
- Kuleli Military High School
- Turkish Naval High School
- St. George's Austrian High School
- St. Joseph High School (Istanbul)
- Liceo Italiano
- Deutsche Schule Istanbul
- Zografeion Lyceum
- Halki Seminary
- Phanar Greek Orthodox College
- Üsküdar American Academy
- Istanbul Technical University
- Galatasaray University
- Boğaziçi University
- Marmara University
- Mimar Sinan Fine Arts University

=== Shopping and commercial districts ===
- İstiklal Avenue
- Kadıköy
- Nişantaşı
- Bebek
- Ortaköy
- Bağdat Avenue

=== Shopping malls ===
Shopping malls in Istanbul

- Akmerkez
- Istanbul Cevahir
- İstinye Park
- Kanyon
- Zorlu Center

=== Sports venues ===
Sport facilities in Istanbul

- Istanbul Park
- Nef Stadium
- Vodafone Park
- Şükrü Saracoğlu Stadium
- Atatürk Olympic Stadium
- Abdi İpekçi Arena
- Sinan Erdem Dome
- Ataköy Athletics Arena
- Ülker Sports Arena
- Veliefendi Race Course
