= Mecidiye Mosque =

Mecidiye Mosque may refer to:

- Ortaköy Mosque, also known as the (Büyük) Mecidiye Mosque, in the Ortaköy neighbourhood of Istanbul
- Küçük Mecidiye Mosque in the Çırağan neighbourhood of Istanbul
- Mecidiye Mosque, Chios
