= Archeion =

Town in ancient Thrace

Coordinates: 41°02′54″N 29°01′39″E

Archeion was a town of ancient Thrace on the Bosphorus, inhabited during Roman times.

Its site is located near Ortaköy in European Turkey.
