= Balyan family =

Ottoman-Armenian dynasty of architects

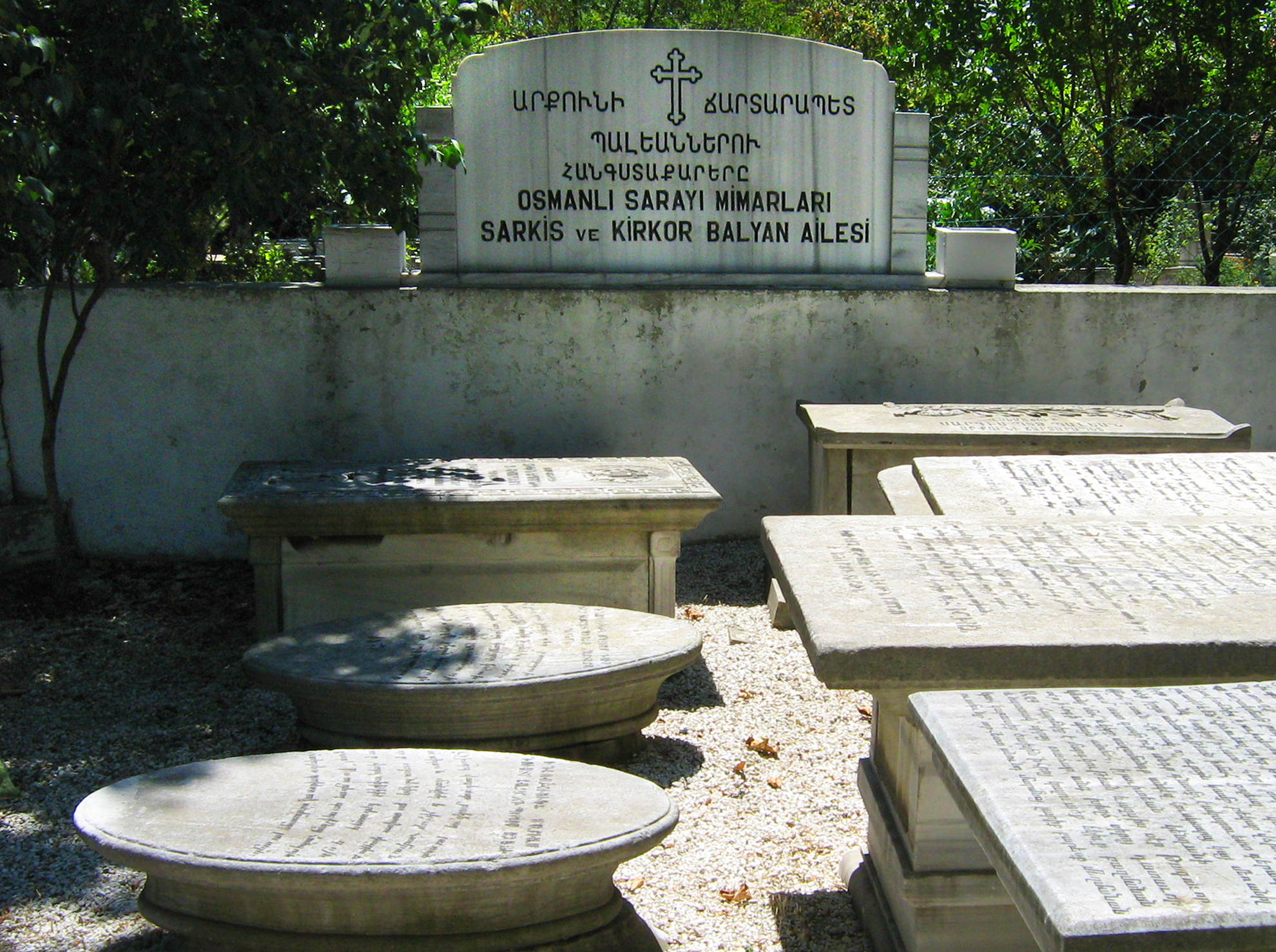
Graves of the Balyan family in the Armenian cemetery on Nuh Kuyusu Caddesi, Bağlarbaşı, Üsküdar, Istanbul.

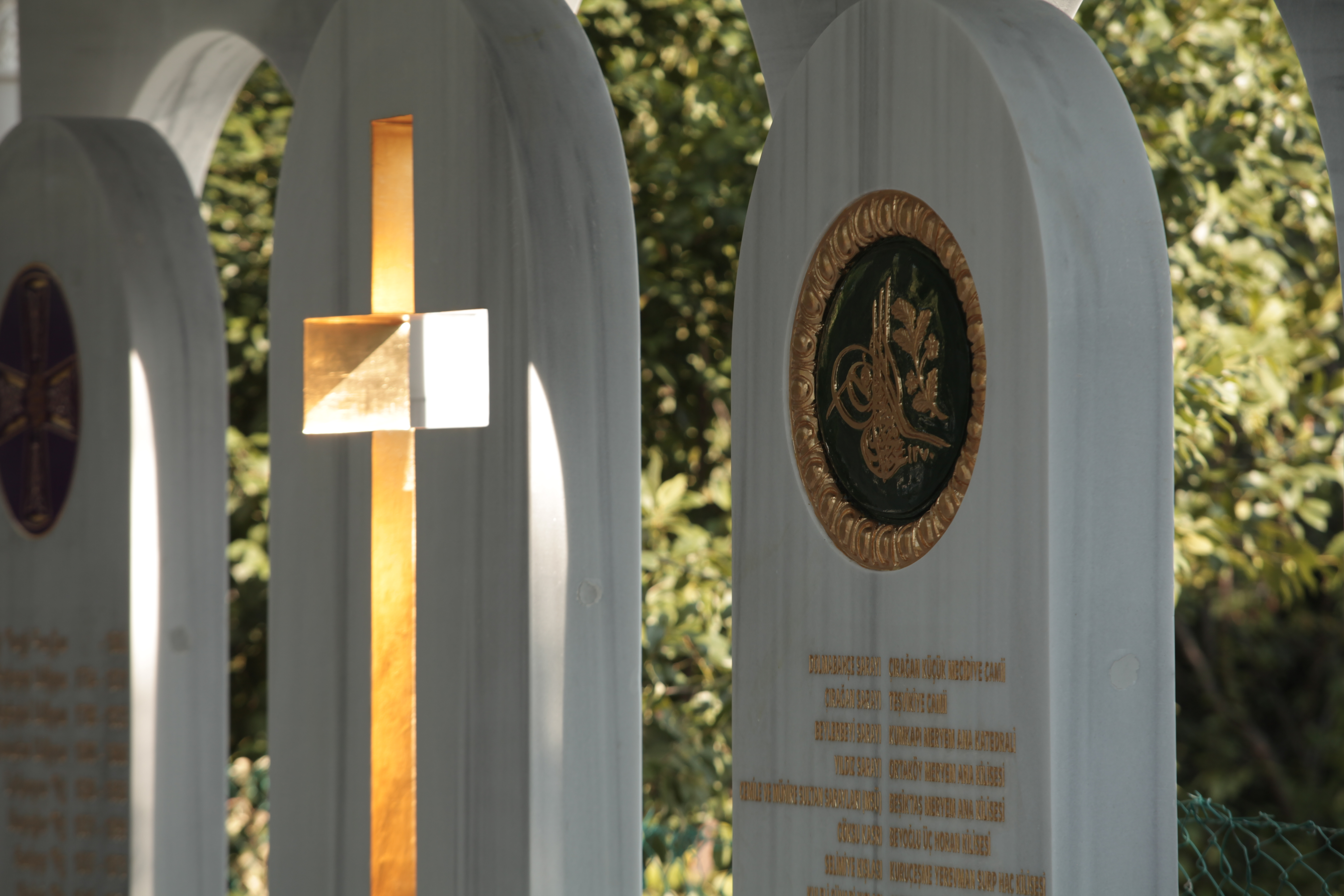
Recently renovated graves of the Balyan family in the Armenian cemetery in Üsküdar, Istanbul.

The Balyan family (Armenian: Պալեաններ; Turkish: Balyan ailesi) was a prominent Armenian family in the Ottoman Empire of court architects in the service of Ottoman sultans and other members of the Ottoman dynasty during the 18th and 19th centuries. For five generations, they designed and constructed numerous major buildings in the Ottoman Empire, including palaces, mansions, konaks, kiosks, yalis, mosques, churches, and various public buildings, mostly in Constantinople (present-day Istanbul).

== Ancestors ==
=== Bali the Mason ===
Bali or Balen the Mason (Turkish: Meremmetçi Bali Kalfa or Meremmetçi Balen Kalfa), a masonry craftsman from the Belen village of Karaman in central Anatolia, was the founder of the dynasty. He moved to Istanbul, where he learned of an Armenian palace architect of Sultan Mehmed IV (1648–1687), whom he met and replaced, being Armenian himself. When Bali died in 1725, his son Magar took his place as architect at the sultan's court.

=== Magar the Architect ===
Magar the Architect (Turkish: Mimar Magar) was charged with important projects and was consequently frequently promoted to higher ranks. However, as a result of a denunciation, he was driven away from the court of Sultan Mahmud I (1730–1754) to exile in the eastern Anatolian town of Bayburt. There, Magar taught his elder son Krikor architecture before being pardoned and returning to Istanbul. Following his retirement, his son Krikor took over his position. Magar's second son Senekerim collaborated with his brother Krikor. Magar died in Bayburt.

== Family tree ==
- Bali (Balen; ?–1725)
  - Magar (?–?)
    - Krikor Balyan (1764–1831)
    - Senekerim Balyan (1768–1833)
    - Garabet Amira Balyan (1800–1866)
      - Nigoğayos Balyan (1826–1858)
        - Levon Balyan (1855-?)
      - Sarkis Balyan (1835–1899)
      - Hagop Balyan (1838–1875)
      - Simon Balyan (1848–1894)

== Members ==
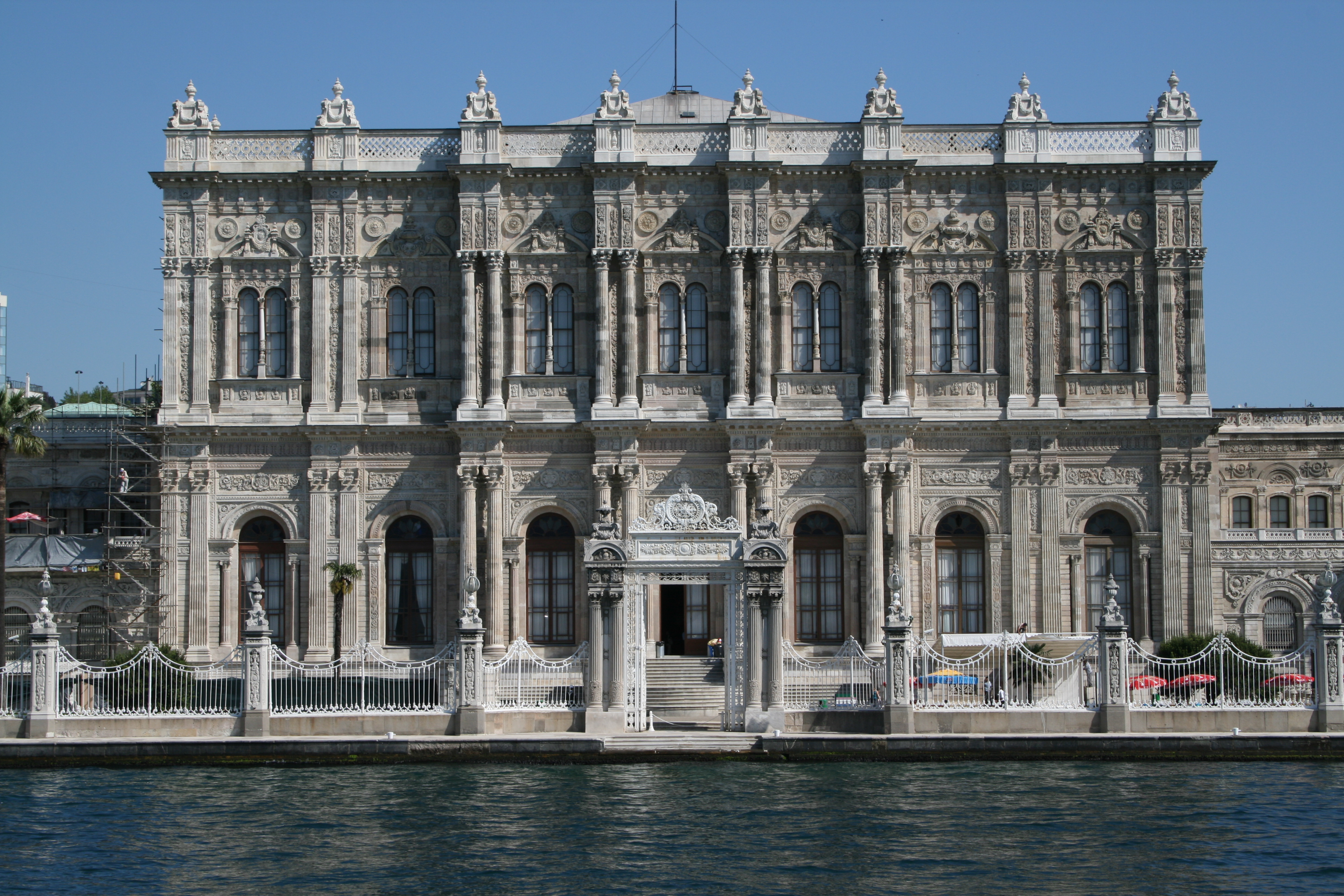
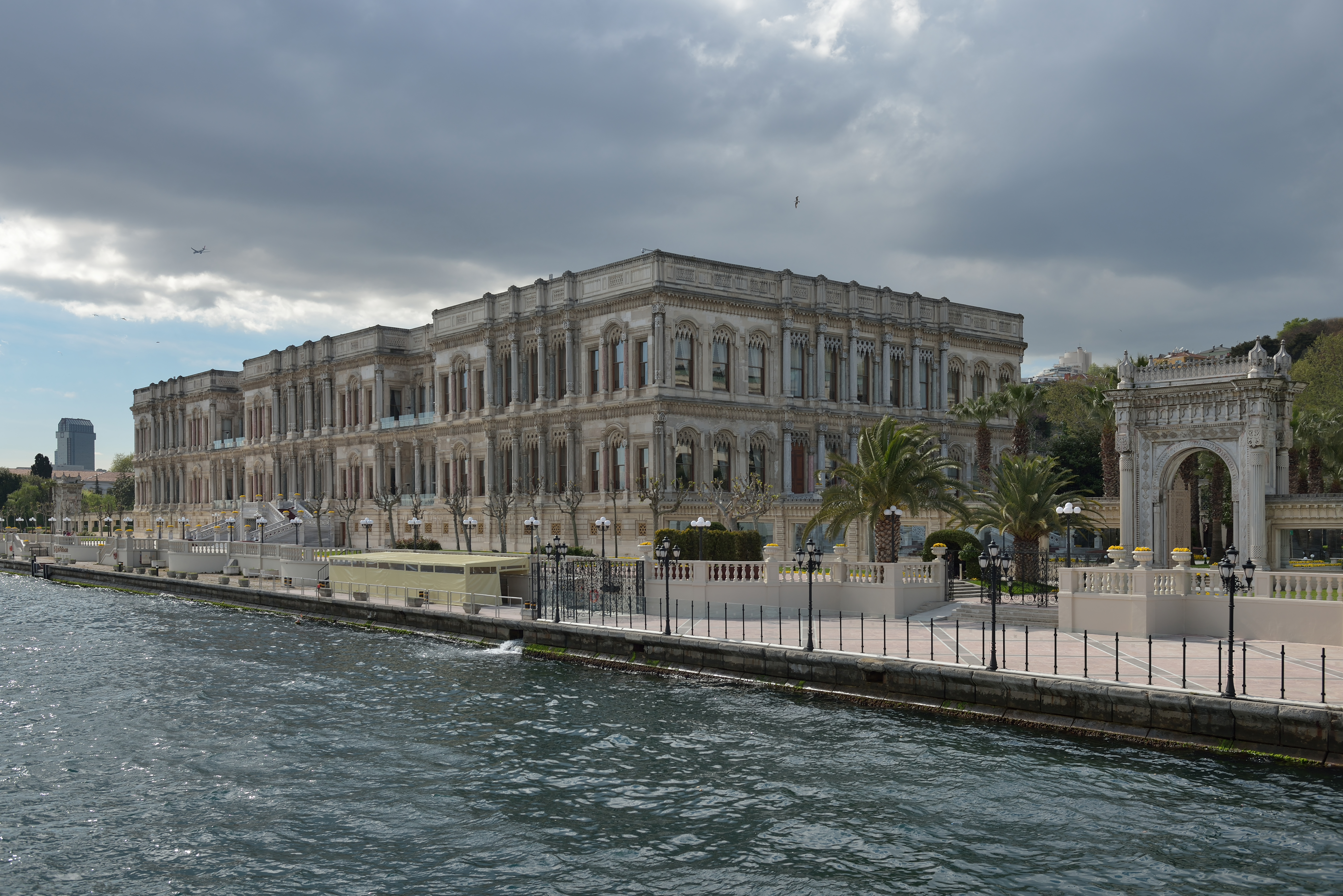
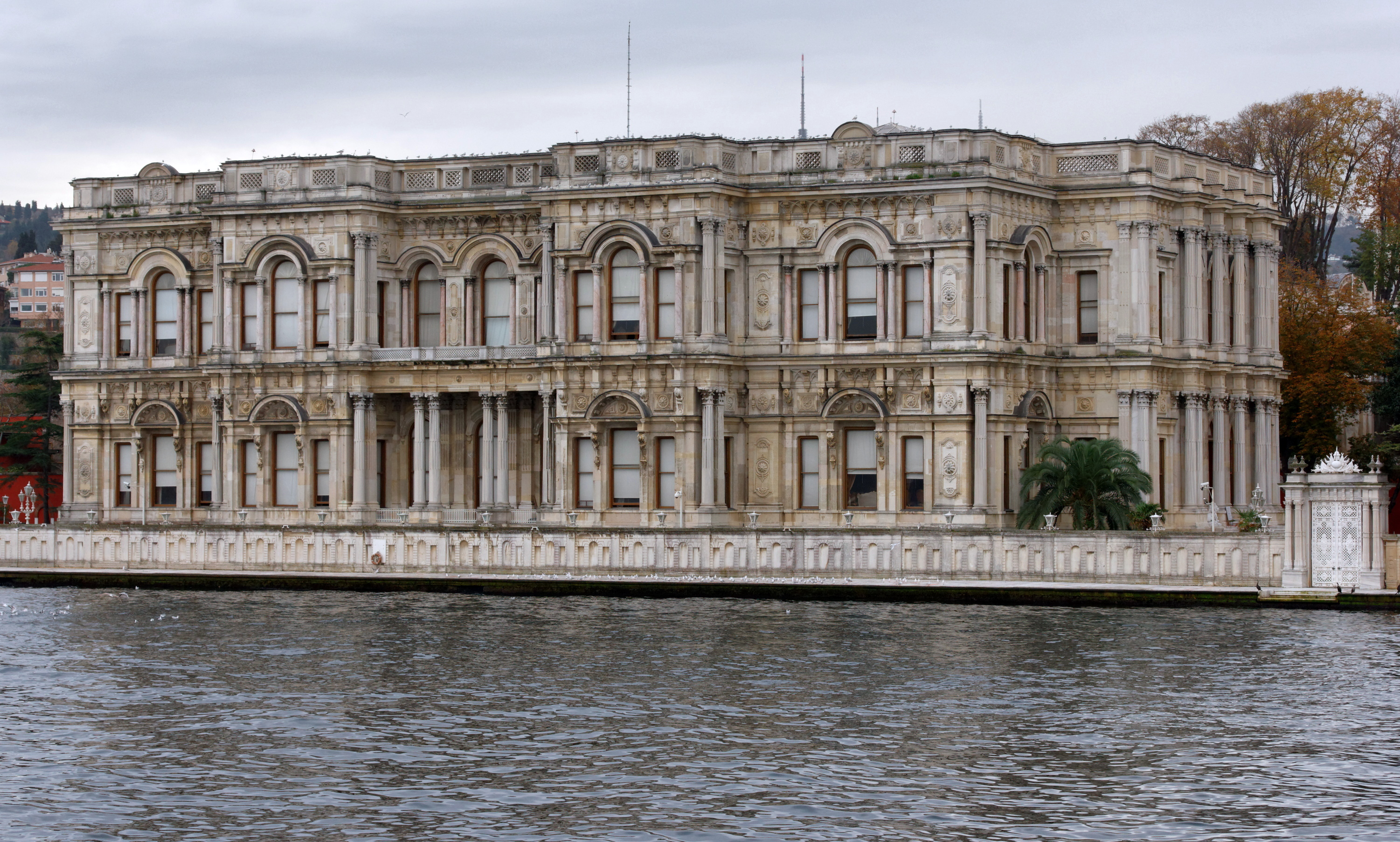

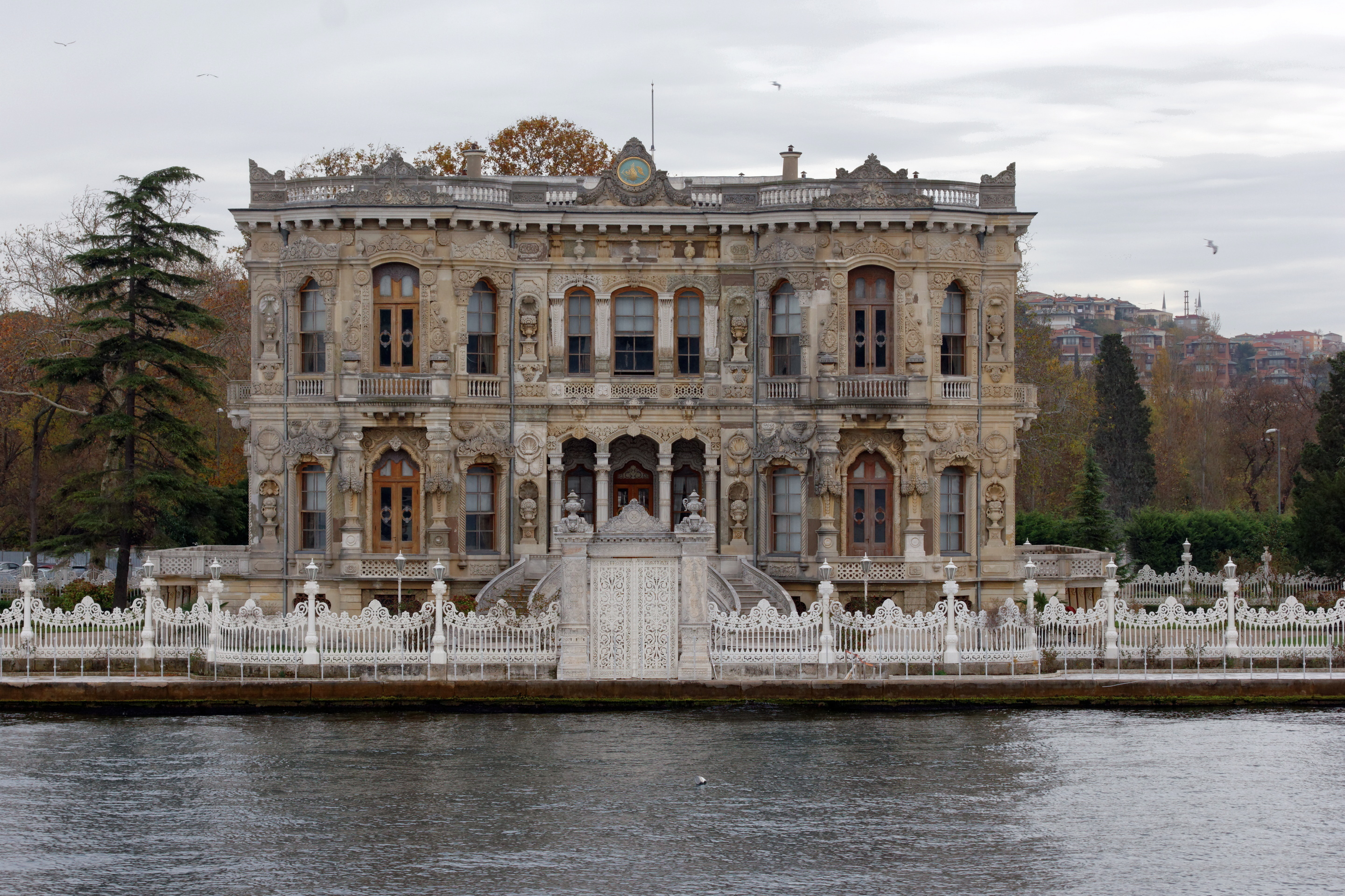
Built by Ottoman sultans Abdülmecid and Abdülaziz, the 19th-century Dolmabahçe, Çırağan, Beylerbeyi and Küçüksu palaces on the European and Asian shores of the Bosporus were designed by members of the Armenian Balyan family of court architects.

=== Krikor Balyan ===
Krikor Balyan (Armenian: Գրիգոր Պալեան, also known as Krikor Amira Balyan; 1764–1831) was the first member of the family to use the surname Balyan. He was called Baliyan or Balyan after his grandfather and later adopted this as the family name Balyan. He was the son-in-law of Mason Minas and father-in-law of Ohannes Amira Severyan, both of whom were palace architects. Krikor received his credential of architecture from Sultan Abdul Hamid I (r. 1774–87). He became unofficial advisor to Sultan Selim III (r. 1789–1807), and was close to Sultan Mahmud II (r. 1808–1839). He was exiled in 1820 to Kayseri in central Anatolia, because of his involvement in a dispute between Gregorian and Catholic Armenians. He was pardoned and allowed to return to Istanbul shortly after a friend of his in the palace, Amira Bezjian.

Krikor died in 1831 after serving the empire during the reigns of four sultans, Abdul Hamid I (r. 1774–1787), Selim III (r. 1789–1807), Mustafa IV (r. 1807–1808), and Mahmud II (r. 1808–1839). His young and inexperienced son Garabet Amira succeeded him.

Krikor's major works include

- Sarayburnu Palace (burned 1875)
- Beşiktaş Palace
- Çırağan Palace (burned by Janissaries)
- Arnavutköy Valide Sultan Palace
- Defterdar Sultan Palace
- Aynalıkavak Pavilion
- Tophane Nusretiye Mosque (1823–1826)
- Taksim Military Barracks
- Selimiye Barracks (1800, burnt 1806)
- Davutpaşa Barracks (1826–1827)
- Beyoğlu Barracks
- Istanbul Mint
- Valide Dam
- Topuzlu Dam

=== Senekerim Balyan ===
Senekerim Balyan (Armenian: Սենեքերիմ Պալեան; 1768–1833) was the son of Architect Magar and the younger brother of Krikor Balyan. He worked together with his brother, but remained in the background. He rebuilt the Beyazit Fire Tower, which had been constructed in wood in 1826 by his brother Krikor, but destroyed after a fire. He died in Jerusalem and was buried in the Armenian church yard.

Senekerim's works include the Beyazıt Fire Tower (1828) and the Surp Asdvadzazdin Armenian Church in Ortaköy (1824).

=== Garabet Amira Balyan ===
Garabet Amira Balyan (Armenian: Կարապետ Պալեան; 1800–1866) was born in Constantinople. At his father's death, he was very young and not experienced enough to take over his father's position by himself. Thus he served alongside his uncle-in-law Mason Ohannes Serveryan. Garabet served during the reigns of Mahmud II (1808–1839), Abdul Mecid I (1839–1861), and Abdulaziz (1861–1876), and constructed numerous buildings in Istanbul. The best known of his works is Dolmabahçe Palace, which he built in collaboration with his son Nigoğayos. Another notable architectural work of his is Beylerbeyi Palace, which was built in cooperation with his other son Sarkis.

Garabet Balyan was also active in the Armenian community's educational and administrative matters and carried out research work on Armenian architecture. His four sons, Nigoğayos, Sarkis, Hagop, and Simon, succeeded him after he died of a heart attack in 1866 while conversing with friends.

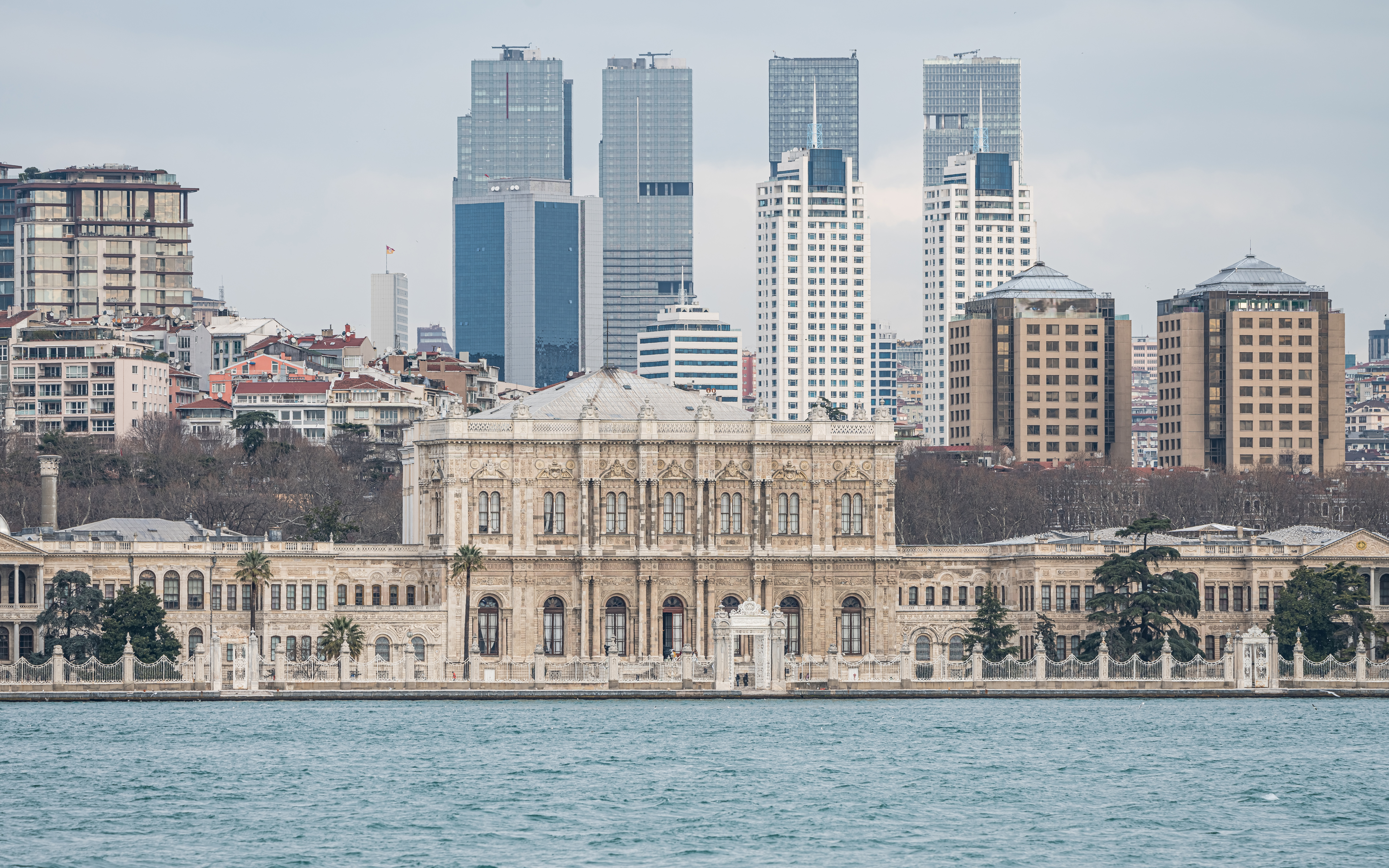
Dolmabahçe Palace

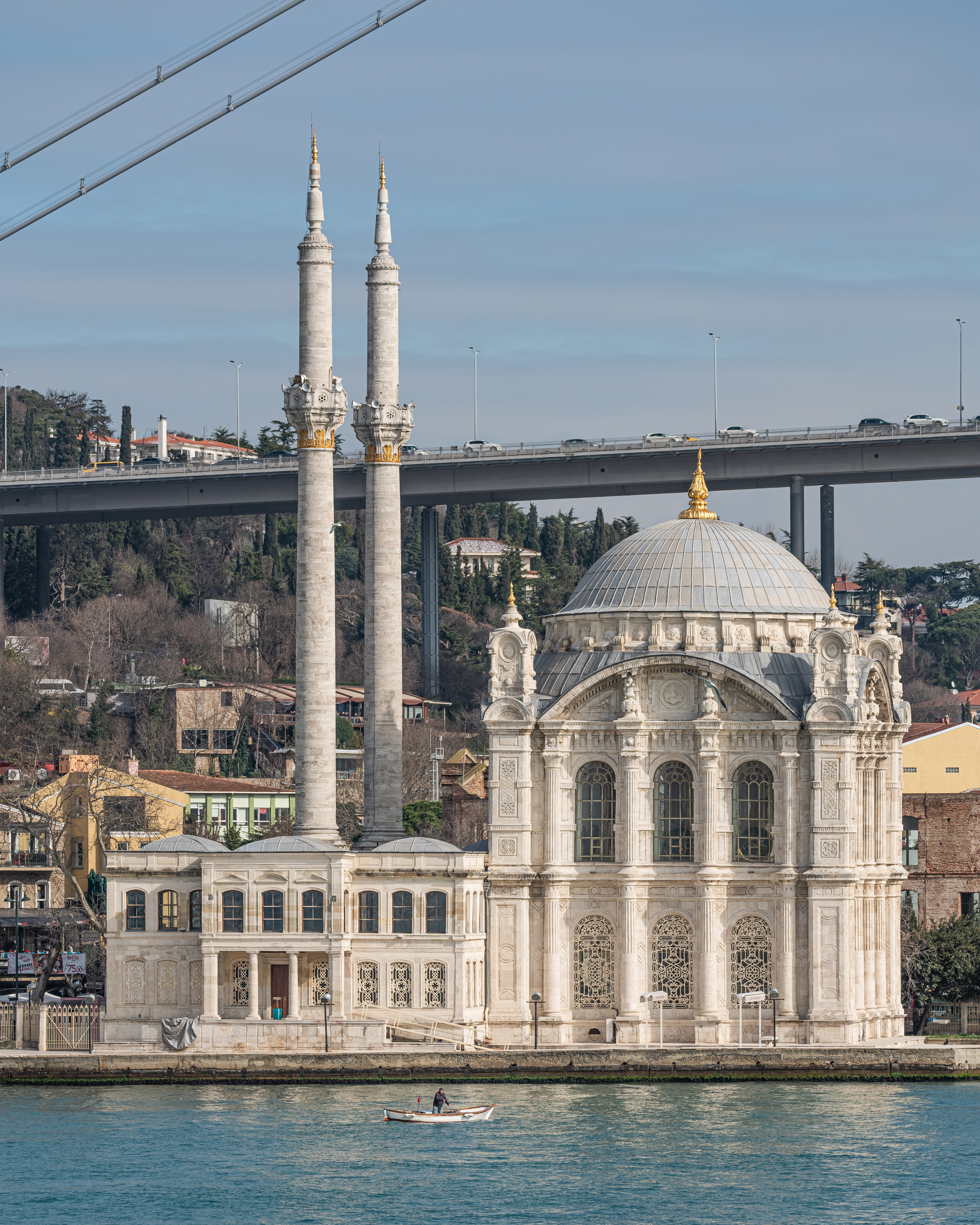
Ortaköy Mosque in front of the Bosphorus Bridge

Garabet's notable works:

- Dolmabahçe Palace, with Nigoğayos Balyan (1848–56)
- New Çırağan Palace
- Yeşilköy Hünkar Kiosk
- Old Yıldız Palace
- Ortaköy Mosque, with Nigoğayos Balyan (1854)
- Nusretiye Clock Tower (1848)
- Beşiktaş Soorp Asdvadzazin Armenian Church (1834)
- Kuruçeşme Soorp Nişan Armenian Church (1834)
- Beyoğlu Soorp Yerrortutyun Church (1838)
- Kumkapı Soorp Asdvadzazin Church
- Academy of Fine Arts (former cannon foundry) building in Tophane
- Fındıklı Cemile and Münire Sultan Palaces (1856–1859; today Mimar Sinan University)
- İzmit Hünkar Palace
- Academy of War
- Mausoleum of Mahmut II with fountain (1840)
- Bakırköy textile factory
- Beykoz tannery (1842)
- Hereke textile factory (1843)
- Armenian hospital (1832–1834)

=== Nigoğayos Balyan ===
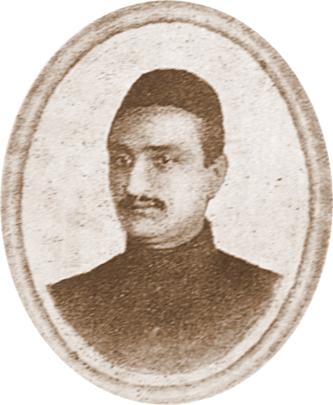
Nigoğayos Balyan (1826–1858)

Nigoğayos Balyan (Armenian: Նիկողայոս Պալեան; also known as Nigoğos Balyan; 1826–1858) was the first son of Garabet Armira Balyan. In 1843, he was sent to Paris together with his brother Sarkis to study architecture at the Collège Sainte-Barbe de Paris. Due to an illness, however, he and his brother had to return to Istanbul in 1845. Working alongside his father Garabet, Nigoğayos gained experience. He was appointed arts advisor to Sultan Abdulmecid I (1839–1861). He founded also a school for domestic architects in order to teach Western architecture.

Nigoğayos worked together with his father on the building of Dolmabahçe Palace (1842–1856). He participated in the preparations for the Armenian National Constitution. Nigoğayos died in Istanbul in 1858 of typhoid fever at the age of 32.

Nigoğayos's notable works:

- Küçük Mecidiye Mosque (1843)
- Ihlamur Pavilion (1849)
- Dolmabahçe Mosque, aka Bezm-i Alem Valide Sultan Mosque (1852–1854)
- Adile Sultan Pavilion, Validebağ (1853)
- Ortaköy Mosque, together with Garabet Amira Balyan (1854)
- Küçüksu Pavilion, aka Göksu Pavilion (1857)
- Armenian Hospital

=== Sarkis Balyan ===
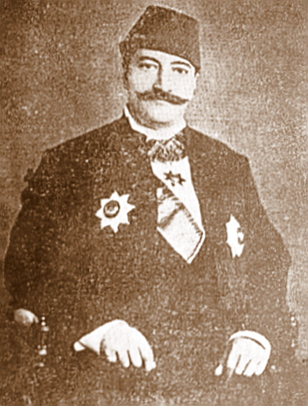
Sarkis Balyan (1835–1899)

Sarkis Balyan (Armenian: Սարգիս Պալեան; 1835–1899) was the second son of Garabet Balyan. In 1843, he followed his elder brother Nigoğayos to Paris. He had to return to Istanbul in 1845 due to an illness of his brother. In 1847, Sarkis went to Paris again to attend Collège Sainte-Barbe de Paris, which he finished after three years. Later, he studied at the Academy of Fine Arts.

After returning to Istanbul, Sarkis began working alongside his father and his brother Nigoğayos. Following the deaths of these two, he continued his work with the younger brother Hagop. Sarkis won greater fame than Hagop because he constructed the structures his brother designed. Sarkis is also known as the designer of many buildings.

Known as a fast worker, his professional life was interrupted by the death of brother Hagop in 1875 and by Abdülhamid II's accession to the throne (1876–1909). Due to political accusations, he was forced into exile in Europe for 15 years, but eventually returned to Turkey through the intercession of Hagop Kazazian Pasha on his behalf.

His most important work is the Valide Sultan Kiosk. Interested in all branches of the fine arts, Sarkis supported Armenian writers, musicians, and particularly theater actors. He was also a member of the Armenian Patriarchate's Assembly. He was awarded the title Ser Mimar (Chief Architect of Ottoman Empire).

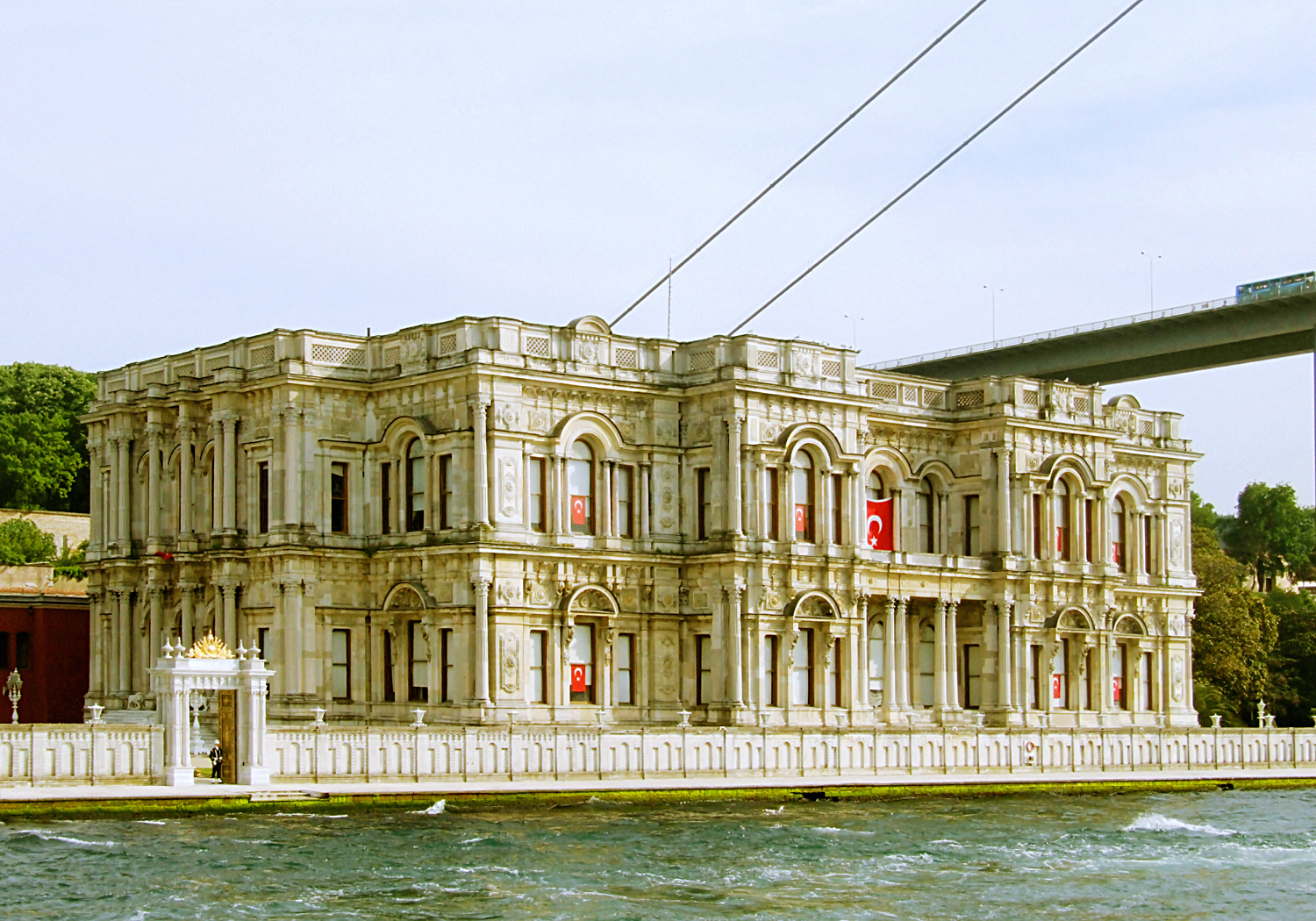
Beylerbeyi Palace

Sarkis's notable works:

- Beylerbeyi Palace, with his father Garabet Balyan (1861–1865)
- Beşiktaş Makruhyan Armenian Primary School (1866; dedicated to the memory of his young died wife Makruhi)
- Malta Pavilion (1870)
- Çırağan Palace (1863–1871)
- Valide Mosque, with brother Hagop Balyan (1871)
- Zeytinburnu Gunpowder Factory (1874)
- Beşiktaş-Akaretler 138 Terraced Houses (construction begun in 1874)
- Esma Sultan Mansion, Ortaköy (1875)
- Adile Sultan Palace, Kandilli (1876)
- Dolmabahçe Clock Tower (1895)
- Ministry of War (today the main building of Istanbul Technical University)
- Imperial School of Medicine (today Galatasaray High School)
- Maçka Arsenal (today the Faculty of Mining, Istanbul Technical University)
- Baltalimanı Coastal Palace
- Old kiosk on Galatasaray Islet
- Holy Mother of God cathedral in Aintab (currently, the Liberation Mosque)

=== Hagop Balyan ===
Hagop Balyan (Armenian: Հակոբ Պալեան; 1838–1875) was the third son of Garabet Balyan. He worked alongside his brother Sarkis on various projects in Istanbul. Hagop died in Paris in 1875 at the age of 37; he was buried in the Père Lachaise Cemetery.

=== Simon Balyan ===
Simon Balyan (Armenian: Սիմոն Պալեան; 1848–1894) was the youngest son of Garabet Balyan. He was also an architect.

=== Levon Balyan ===
Levon Balyan (Armenian: Լեւոն Պալեան; 1855–1925) was the son of Nigoğayos Balyan. He attended Collège Sainte-Barbe in Paris in 1869.

== Buildings and structures ==
Buildings and structures designed and constructed by Balyan family members:

Royal residences
- Dolmabahçe Palace (1848–56)
- Beylerbeyi Palace (burnt by Janissaries, rebuilt) (1861–1865)
- Çırağan Palace (1863–1871)
- Topkapı Palace
- Sarayburnu Palace (burnt in 1875)
- Beşiktaş Palace
- Valide Sultan Palace, Arnavutköy
- Defterdar Sultan Palace
- Adile Sultan Palace, Kandilli (1876)
- Eyup Twin Palaces
- Salıpazarı Palace
- Yıldız Palace
- Fındıklı Cemile and Münire Sultan Palaces (1856–59)
- İzmit Hünkar Palace
- Baltalimanı Coastal Palace
- Aynalıkavak Palace
- Esma Sultan Mansion (1875)
- Adile Sultan Pavilion, Validebağ (1853)
- Ihlamur Pavilion (1849)
- Küçüksu (Göksu) Pavilion (1857)
- Malta Kiosk
- Sultan Mahmud I Kiosk
- Yeşilköy Hünkar Kiosk
- Old kiosk on Galatasaray islet

Religious buildings

- Tophane Nusretiye Mosque (1823–26)
- Ortaköy Mosque (1852–1854)
- Dolmabahçe Mosque (Bezm-i Alem Valide Sultan Mosque; 1852–54)
- Aksaray Valide Mosque (1871)
- Üsküdar Surp Haç Armenian Church
- Kayseri Surp Krikor Lusavoriç Armenian Church
- Beşiktaş Surp Nişan Armenian Church (1834)
- Ortaköy Surp Asdvadzadzin Armenian Church (1824)
- Kuruçeşme Surp Nişan Armenian Church
- Bandırma Armenian Church
- Beyoğlu Surp Yerrortutyun Church (1838)
- Kumkapı Surp Asdvadzadzin Patriarchal Church
- Mausoleum of Sultan Mahmud II (1840)
- Mausoleum of Sultan Abdülmecit I
- Mausoleum of Sultan Abdülaziz

Public buildings

- Istanbul Mint
- Selimiye Barracks (1800)
- Davutpaşa Barracks (1826–1827)
- Beyoğlu Barracks
- Maçka Arsenal
- Ministry of War
- Academy of War
- Palace School of Medicine
- Academy of Fine Arts
- Beşiktaş Makruhyan Armenian Primary School (1866)
- Beyazit Tower (1828)
- Dolmabahçe Clock Tower (1895)
- Nusretiye Clock Tower (1848)
- Topuzlu Dam
- Valide Dam
- Beşiktaş-Akaretler 138 Terraced Houses (1874)
- Surp Prgiç Armenian National Hospital (1827–1834)

Production facilities

- Zeytinburnu iron works
- İzmit textile factory
- Hereke textile factory (1843)
- Bakırköy textile factory
- Beykoz tannery
- Zeytinburnu gunpowder factory (1874)

== See also ==
- Ottoman architecture
