= Beyazıt Tower =

The Beyazıt Tower
- Beyazıt Kulesi
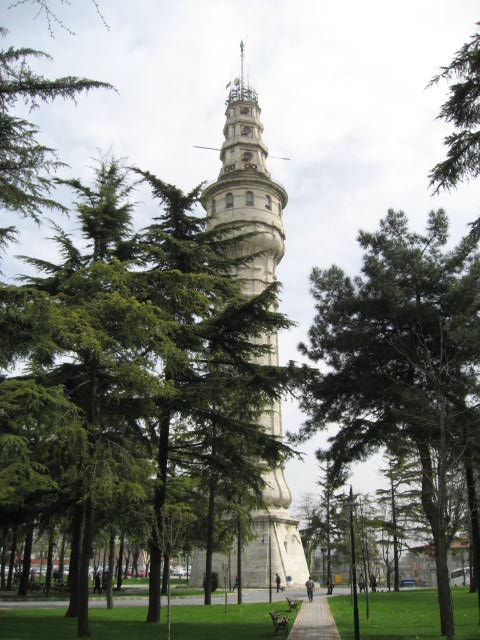
- Beyazıt Tower in the main campus of Istanbul University

General information
- Type: Observation tower Broadcasting tower
- Location: Istanbul, Turkey
- Coordinates: 41.0128°N 28.9649°E
- Construction started: 1749
- Completed: 1749
- Opening: 1749
- Owner: City of Istanbul, Turkey
- Operator: Beyazıt Kulesi, İstanbul Büyükşehir Belediyesi BELTUR

Height
- Architectural: 85 m (279 ft)
- Tip: 85 m (279 ft)
- Top floor: 85 m (279 ft)

Technical details
- Floor count: 3
- Lifts/elevators: 0

Design and construction
- Architect: Senekerim Balyan

References
- https://www.tripadvisor.com.tr/

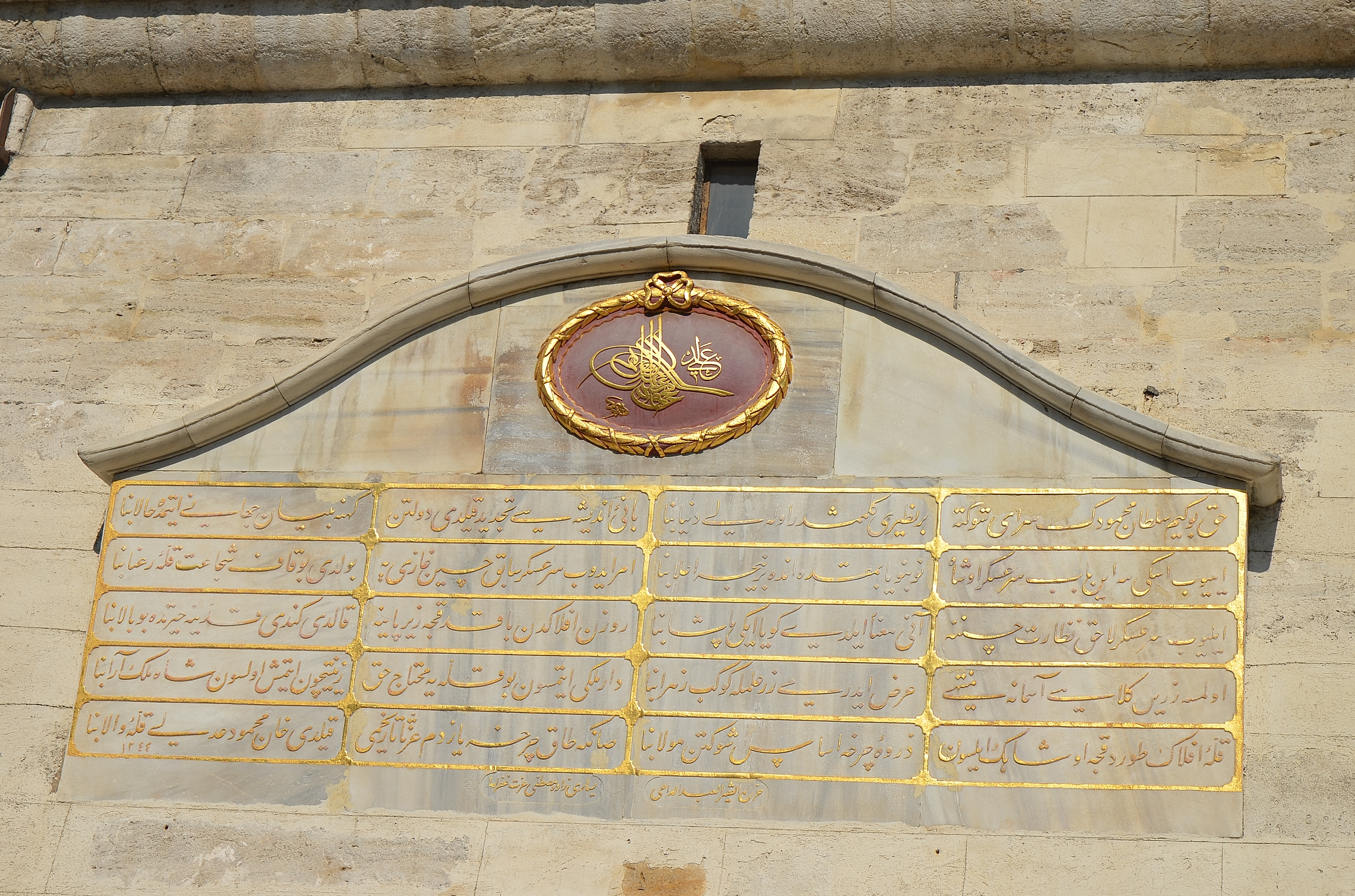
Inscription of Beyazıt Tower.

Beyazıt Tower, also named Seraskier Tower, from the name of the Ottoman ministry of War, is an 85-metre-tall (279 ft) fire-watch tower located in the courtyard of Istanbul University's main campus (formerly Ottoman Ministry of War) on Beyazıt Square (known as the Forum Tauri in the Roman period) in Istanbul, Turkey.

Beyazıt Tower was ordered by the Ottoman Sultan Mahmud II (1808–1839), and designed by Senekerim Balyan, who built it of stone in 1828 on the place of the original wooden Beyazıt Tower, which was destroyed in a fire and was constructed earlier by the architect's brother, Krikor Balyan.

It is currently equipped with a lighting system to indicate weather conditions in different colors. Red colour means snow, blue—nice and clear weather, green—rain and yellow—fog.

== History ==
The first fire-watch tower in Beyazıt was built of timber in 1749, but it was burnt down during the 1756 Great Fire of Cibali. It was replaced by another timber tower on the same location, which was destroyed following the riots stirred by Sultan Mahmud II's decision to dissolve the Janissary Corps in 1826. The same year, another wooden tower was erected on the plot, designed and built by the palace architect Krikor Balyan, which was again set on fire by adherents of the Janissaries. Finally, the current tower, made of stone, was built in 1828 by Senekerim Balyan in Ottoman Baroque style.

The stone tower originally had a single floor of around 50 m^{2} at the top for fire watching, which was reached through a wooden staircase of 180 steps. This watch room has 13 round arched windows. Initially, the tower had a timber roof in the form of a cone. In 1849, three floors in octagonal plan with round windows were added on the top section: one for signaling, one for signal baskets and the last one for flags. The smaller diameter of the highest three floors makes space for a terrace at the second floor. In 1889, an iron pole of 13 metres was erected on the roof. The tower was partly damaged by the earthquake of 1889 and was subsequently restored. At present, the tower has a stone roof and a wooden staircase of 256 steps.

Fire was an important threat for Istanbul and caused numerous wide scale disasters, largely because most houses in the Old City's historic quarters were made of timber. Beyazıt Tower, Galata Tower and İcadiye Fire Tower (on Vaniköy Hill) were used for spotting fire threats, as they commanded long-distance views of the city from above. The entire Old City (Yedikule, Topkapı, Kocamustafapaşa, Fatih, Beyazıt), the cross-section of the Golden Horn districts (Fener, Balat, Eminönü) and those of the Bosphorus (Tophane, Beşiktaş, Ortaköy), the entrance of the Sea of Marmara (Üsküdar, Kadıköy) and even the Princes' Islands towards the southeast of the city were within the range of watch sight from Beyazıt Tower.

Fire was signaled at daytime by lowering baskets and at night by lighting colored lamps. The number of the baskets or the number and the color of the lamps indicated the location, i.e. in which district of Istanbul the fire outbroke. As a response, the Watch Tower of Icadiye on the Anatolian side of the Bosphorus then fired 7 volleys to inform the citizens of the fire. Twenty firefighters were stationed in the Beyazıt Tower until 1923. In 1997, the structure underwent a thorough restoration.

Beyazıt Tower is still in use today as a watch-tower as well as for signaling weather forecast and maritime navigation information to the ships on the Golden Horn at night. The tower lost its importance with the development of advanced communications technology. Recently, two firefighters in three shifts are stationed in the tower for guarding purposes only. Since 1972, special permission is required to enter the tower.

== See also ==
- List of columns and towers in Istanbul
- List of towers
