= Küçüksu Pavilion =

Ottoman pavilion in Istanbul, Turkey

Coordinates: 41°04′42.42″N 29°03′53.46″E

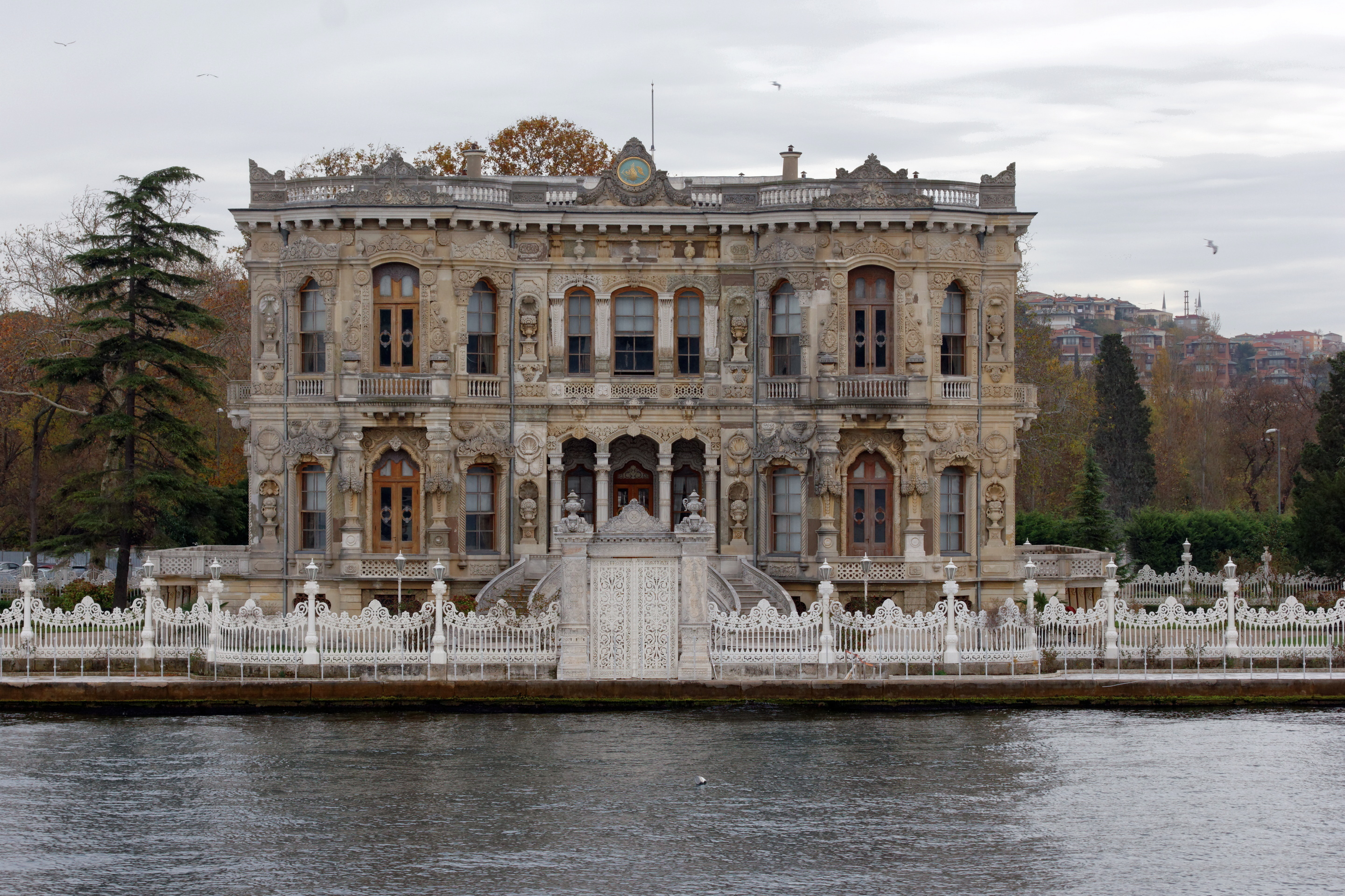
- Küçüksu Pavilion seen from the Bosphorus

Küçüksu Pavilion (Turkish: Küçüksu Kasrı), Littlewater Pavilion a.k.a. Göksu (Skywater) Pavilion, is a summer pavilion in Istanbul, Turkey, situated in the Küçüksu neighborhood of Beykoz district on the Asian shore of the Bosphorus between Anadoluhisarı and the Fatih Sultan Mehmet Bridge. The pavilion was used by Ottoman sultans for short stays during country excursions and hunting.

== History ==
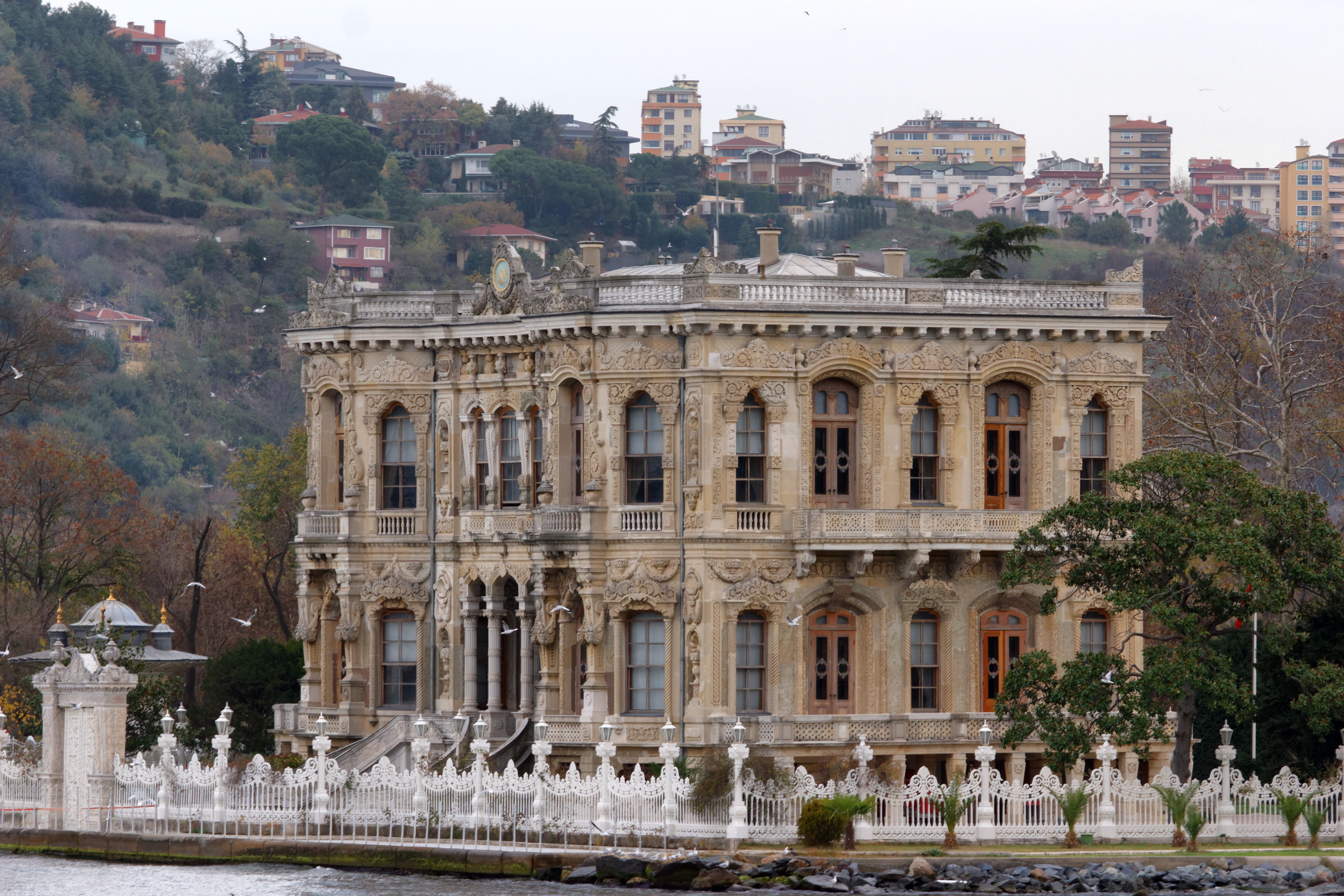
The palace view from Bosphorus

The pavilion was commissioned by Sultan Abd-ul-Mejid I (1823–1861), and designed by the architects Garabet Amira Balyan and his son Nigoğayos Balyan in the neo-baroque style. Completed in 1857, the structure took the place of a two-storey timber palace built during the reign of Mahmud I (1696–1754) by his Grand Vizier Divittar Mehmed Pasha, then successively used by Selim III (1761–1808) and Mahmud II (1785–1839).

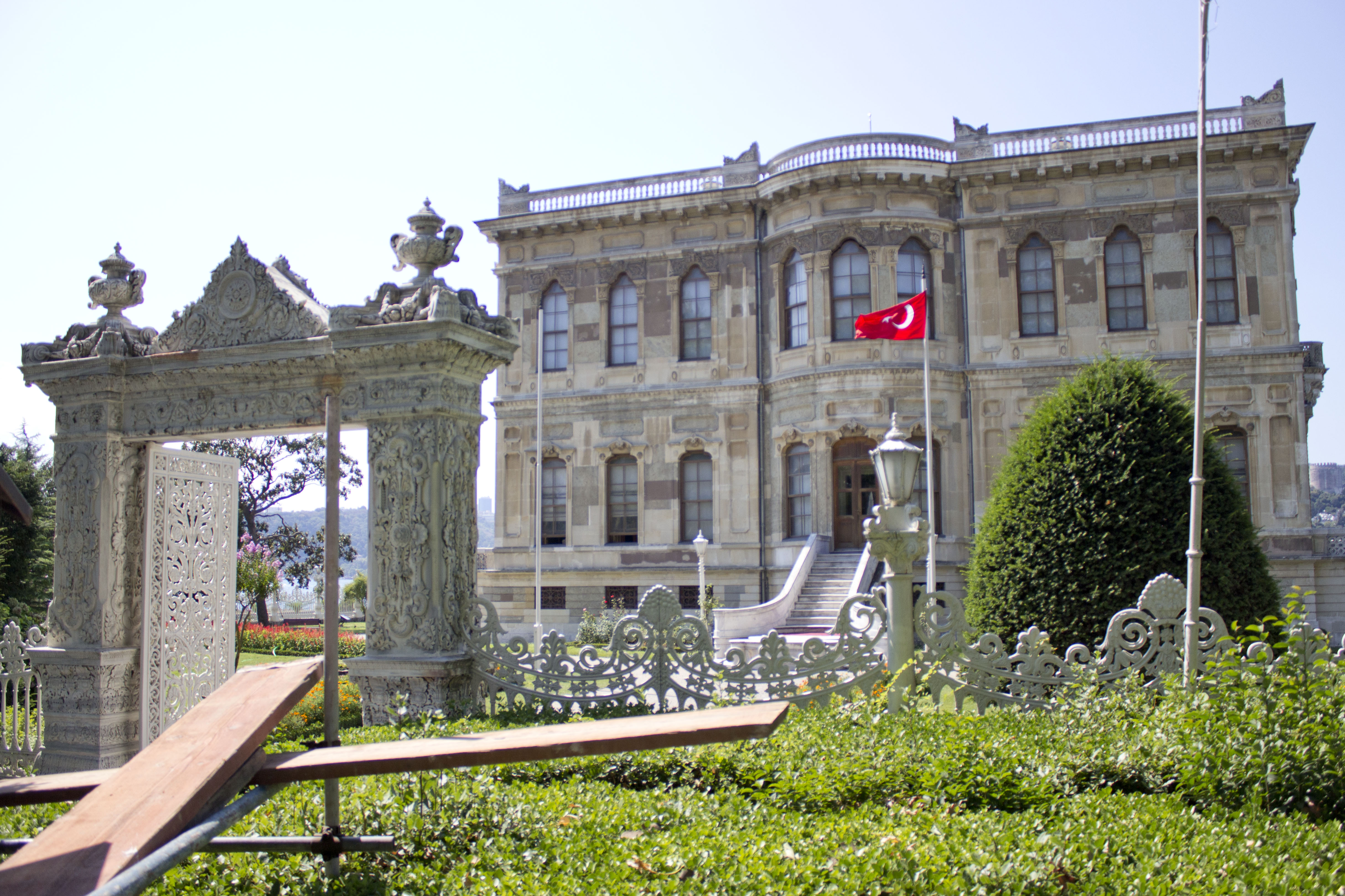
Entrance to the palace grounds from land

The building consists of two main stories and a basement on a footprint of 15 x 27 m. Unlike other pavilion gardens with high walls, its garden is surrounded by cast iron railings with one gate at each of the four sides. The basement was appointed with kitchen, larder, and servant's quarters, with the floors above reflecting the design of a traditional Turkish house - four corner rooms surrounding a central hall. The rooms at the waterfront have two fireplaces while the others have one each, all fashioned from colorful Italian marble. The rooms boast crystal chandeliers from Bohemia, with curtains, furniture upholstery, and carpets woven in Hereke. The halls and the rooms exhibit paintings and arts objects; Charles Séchan, stage designer at Vienna State Opera, was charged with the decoration of the interior.

During the reign of Abdulaziz (1830–1876), more elaborate decoration was added to the façade; some of the original garden outbuildings were demolished at that time. In the beginning of the Republican era, the site was used as a state guesthouse for some years. Since a thorough restoration in 1944, the palace has been open to the public as a museum.

The pavilion appeared in the James Bond film "The World Is Not Enough" as the mansion of oil heiress Elektra King in Baku. It also appeared in popular Bollywood film Ek Tha Tiger.

== See also ==
- Khedive's Palace
- Ottoman architecture

== Literature ==
- Hakan Gülsün. Küçüksu Pavilion. TBMM, Istanbul, 1995.

== Gallery ==
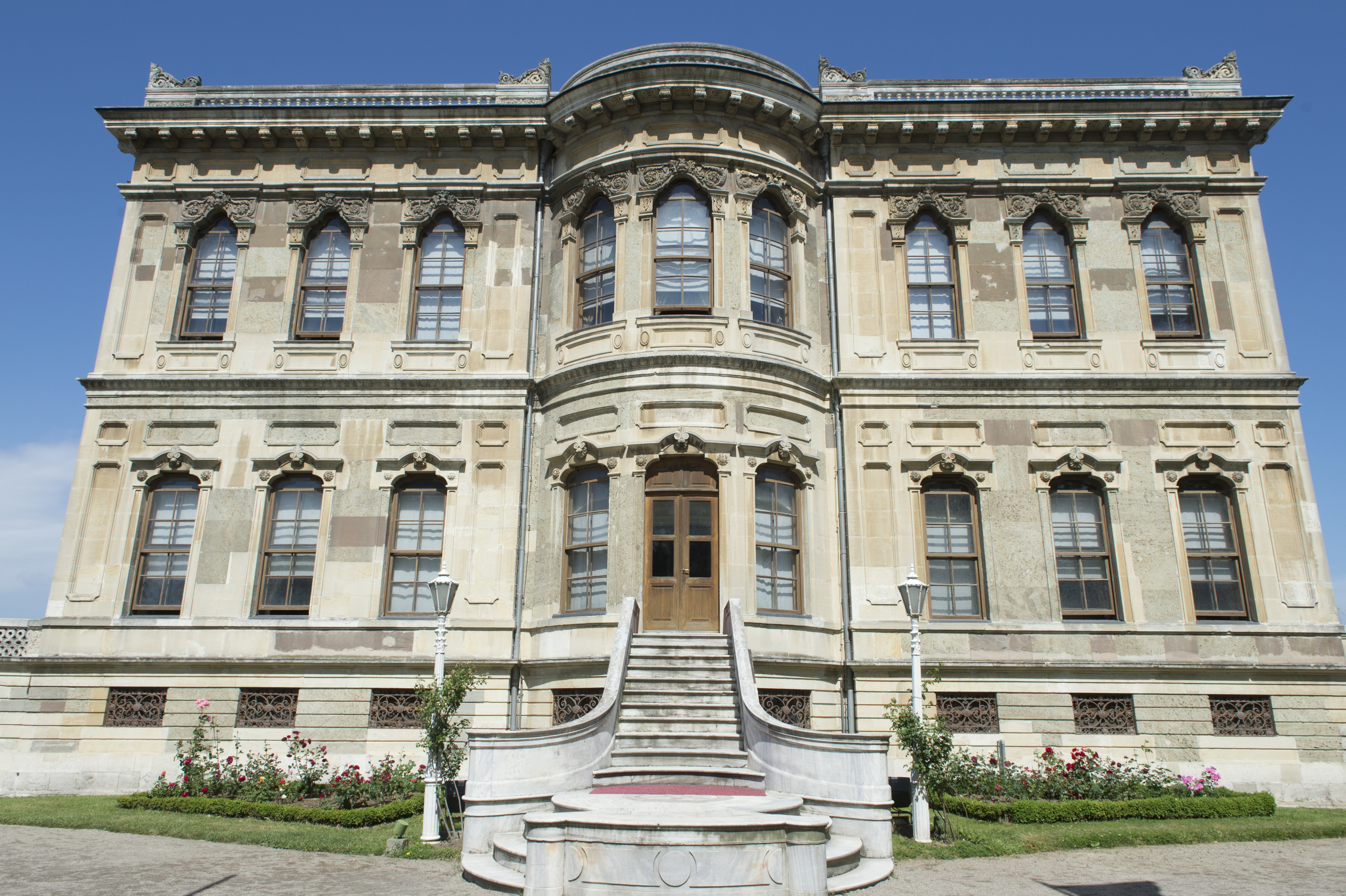
Kücüksü Pavilion South side

Kücüksü Pavilion South-west side

Kücüksü Pavilion North side

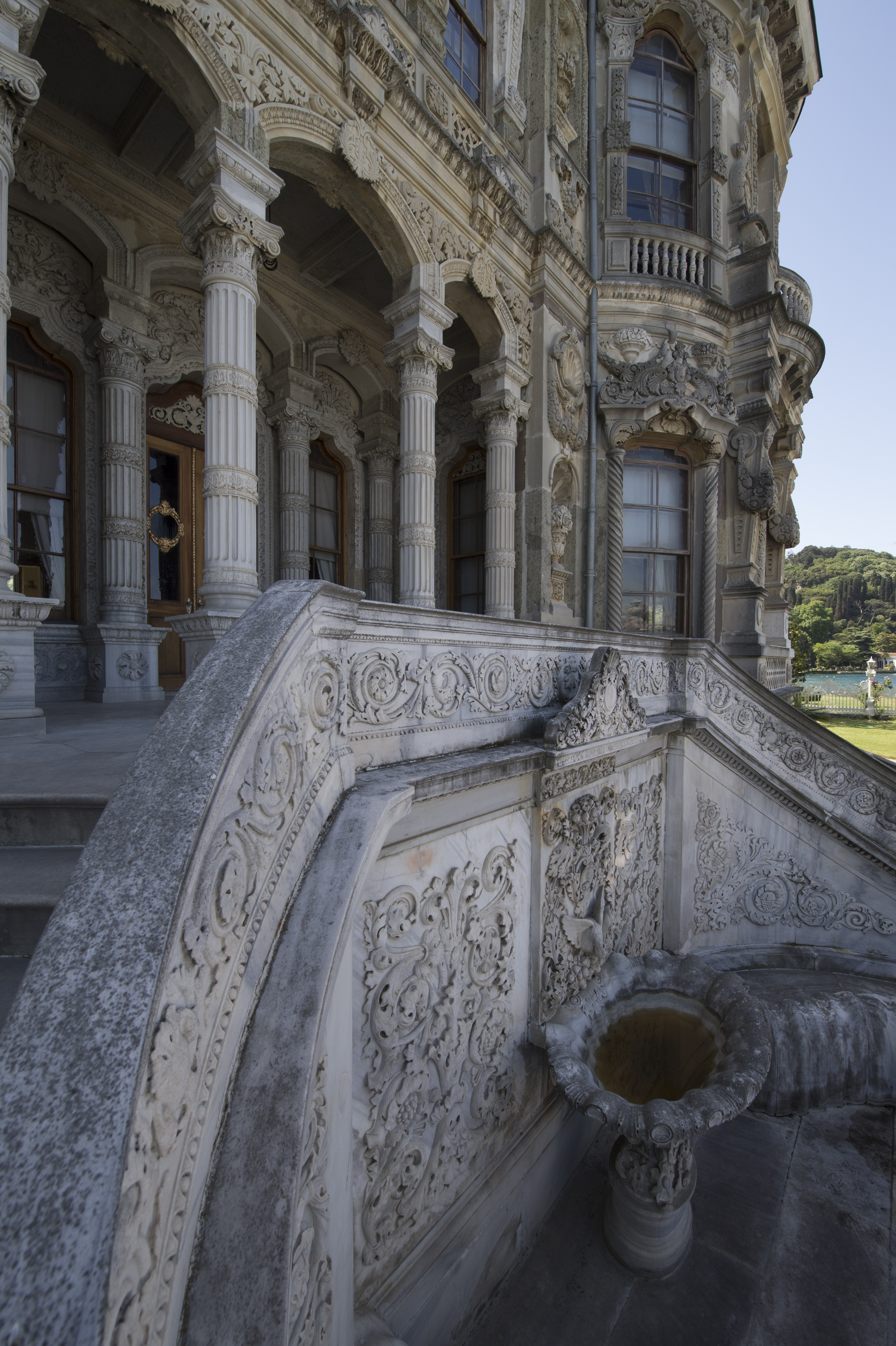
Kücüksü Pavilion North side stairs

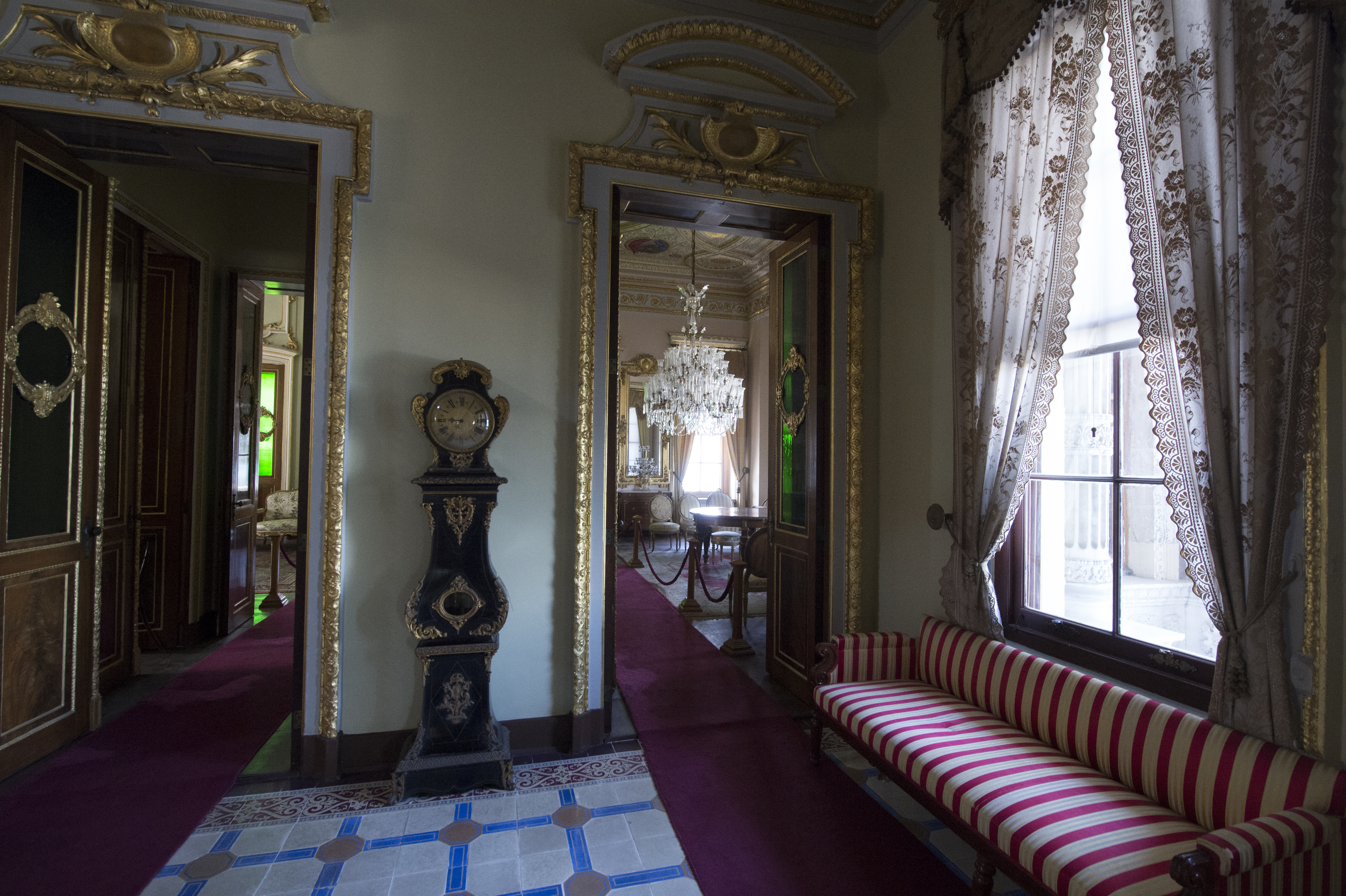
Kucuksu Pavilion Interior
