= Ortaköy Mosque =

Mosque in Beşiktaş, Istanbul, Turkey

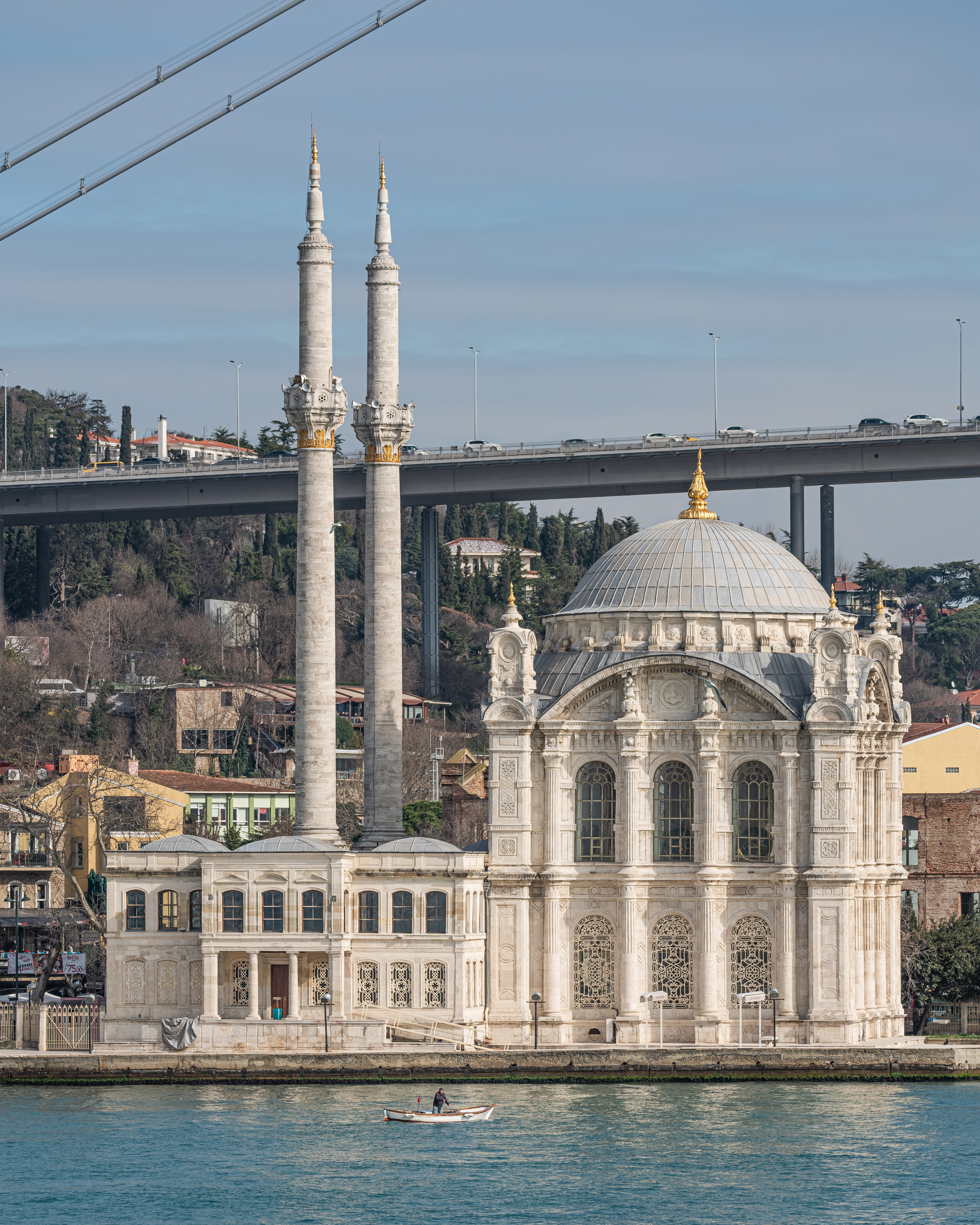
- Ortaköy Mosque in Istanbul, on the European shoreline of the Bosphorus strait, with the Bosphorus Bridge in the background

Religion
- Affiliation: Islam

Location
- Location: Istanbul, Turkey
- Interactive map of Ortaköy Mosque
- Coordinates: 41°2′49″N 29°1′37″E

Architecture
- Architects: Garabet Balyan, Nigoğayos Balyan
- Type: Mosque
- Style: Ottoman (19th-century eclectic)
- Completed: 1854 or 1856
- Minaret: 2

Ortaköy Mosque (Turkish: Ortaköy Camii), formally the Büyük Mecidiye Camii (Turkish: Büyük Mecidiye Camii, lit. 'Great Mosque of Sultan Abdulmejid') in Beşiktaş, Istanbul, Turkey, is a mosque situated at the waterside of the Ortaköy pier square, one of the most popular locations on the Bosphorus. It was commissioned by the Ottoman sultan Abdülmecid I, and its construction was completed around 1854 or 1856.

This structure is symbolic of the district of Ortaköy and is often photographed, as it offers a distinctive view of the Bosphorus Strait of Istanbul and the Bosphorus Bridge.

== History ==
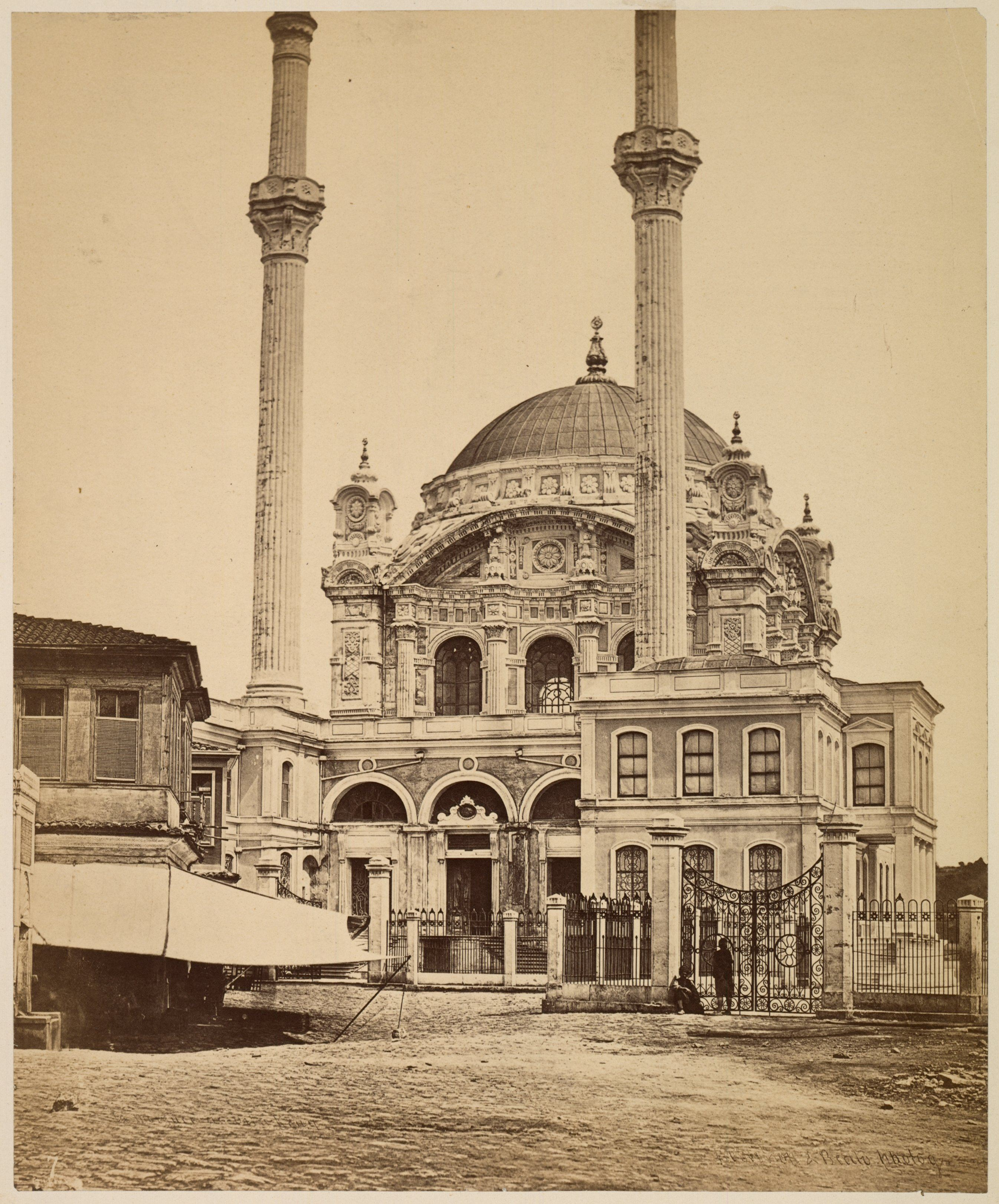
Early photograph of the mosque (taken between 1854 and 1867) showing original fluted minarets, which were replaced with the current design after an earthquake in 1894.

On the site of the present-day Ortaköy Mosque there was previously a small mosque built in 1720 and ruined during the Patrona Halil Uprising in 1731. The current mosque was commissioned by the Ottoman sultan Abdülmecid I and built or completed around 1854 or 1856 (the exact dates of construction vary between scholarly sources). (Note: For example, Alyson Wharton states that construction on the mosque began in 1848 and finished in 1854–5, and likewise Ahmet Ersoy and the Grove Encyclopedia of Islamic Art and Architecture (edited by Jonathan Bloom and Sheila Blair) cite the year of completion as 1854–5. Ünver Rüstem cites the years 1854 to 1856, while Martina Müller-Wiener similarly gives the year of completion as 1856. Doğan Kuban gives the year 1853.) Its architects were Armenian father and son Garabet Balyan and Nikoğos Balyan, who worked as a team and who also designed the nearby Dolmabahçe Palace and the Dolmabahçe Mosque in 1853–1855.

The mosque was damaged in the 1894 Istanbul earthquake, and it also suffered a minor fire in 1984. Thus, the structure has undergone a number of repair and restoration work in its time. After the 1894 quake, the mosque was repaired by the Ministry of Foundations in 1909, and the original fluted minarets were replaced with more austere masonry work. The single dome of the mosque was originally built using bricks and it developed cracks over time. By the 1960s, the building was also starting to lean and the dome was ready to collapse, so its foundations were reinforced and a new dome was reconstructed using concrete. The mosque reopened in 1969.

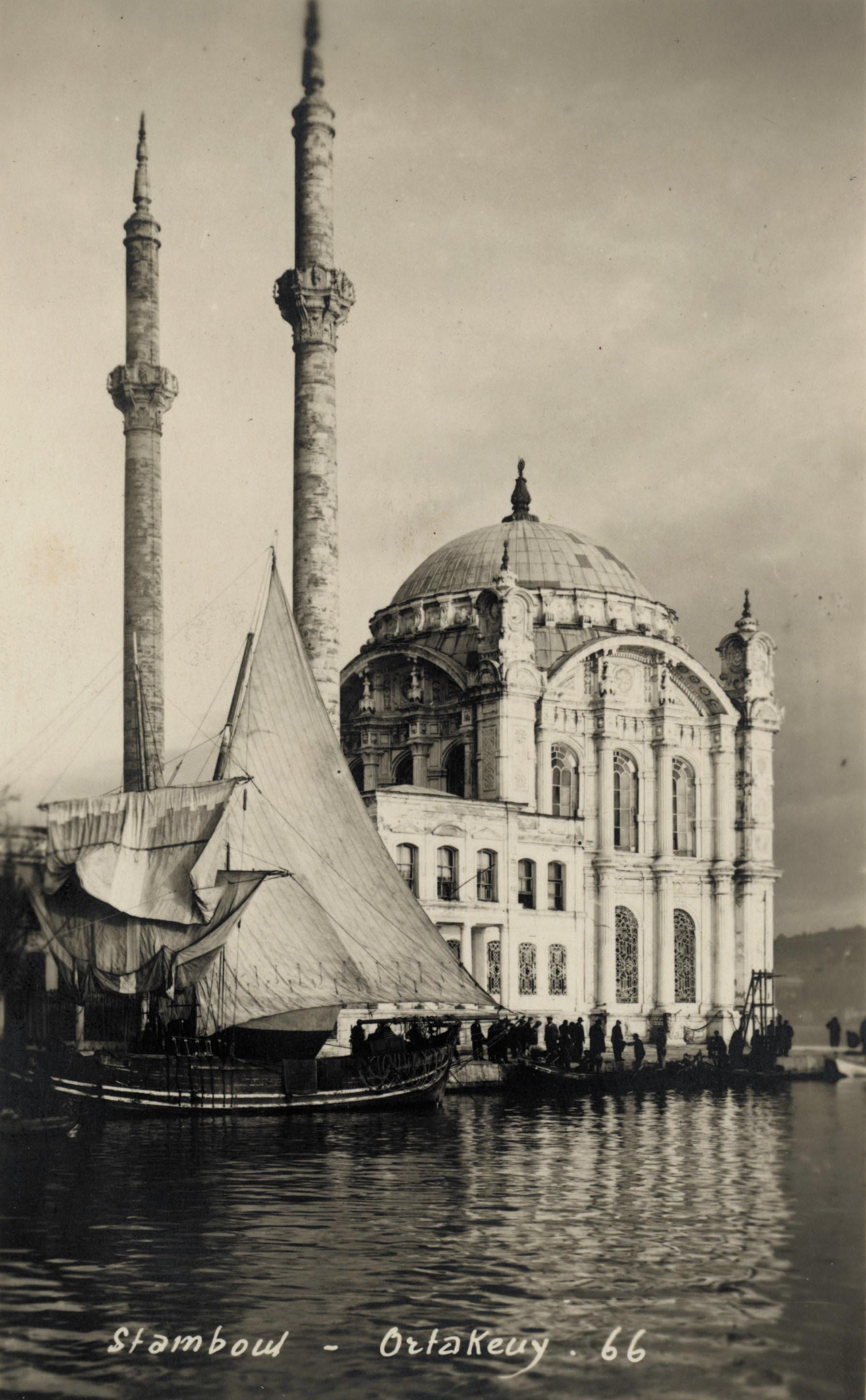
Ortaköy Mosque in the first quarter of the 20th century

A three-year restoration project by the General Directorate of Foundations was completed in 2014, at a cost of almost 7 million liras. The mosque was officially reopened on 6 June 2014 with a ceremony attended by Recep Tayyip Erdoğan, the Prime Minister at the time, and other government officials.

== Architecture ==
As with their other projects in Istanbul, the Balyans designed the mosque in a mixed or eclectic style incorporating contemporary European Revivalist trends such as Neoclassical, along with some details and overall design elements drawn from the earlier Ottoman Baroque style. However, it is distinguished from other mosques of the period by its particularly ornate stone-carved decoration.

The building consists of a two-story imperial apartment for the sultan, which has a U-shaped plan, and a main prayer hall for the mosque, which has a square plan covered with one dome. The facades with engaged columns are decorated by carved stone reliefs, giving the mosque a "dynamic appearance". There are two rows of windows providing the mosque with illumination. The reconstructed dome was built from concrete, while stone was used to build the two, slim minarets. The minarets have balconies resembling Corinthian capitals.

The mosque is small in comparison to other mosques on the other side of the Golden Horn. In terms of the interior space, it is modest in scale but the inside is spacious and has wide, tall windows which refract its reflection in water as well as allowing in daylight. Materials like marble and porphyry were used to build the mihrab and minbar. The inside of the dome is adorned with Trompe-l'œil frescoes, which were a feature first introduced to Ottoman architecture during the reign of Abdülmecid I. The trompe-l'œil paintings here include depictions of niche-like windows with curtains as well as rows of mihrabs, executed in a Neo-Renaissance style while also incorporating elements of traditional Islamic architecture and decoration within that style. The mosque's interior also features several panels of calligraphy executed by Abdülmecid I himself, as he was a calligrapher along with being a sultan.

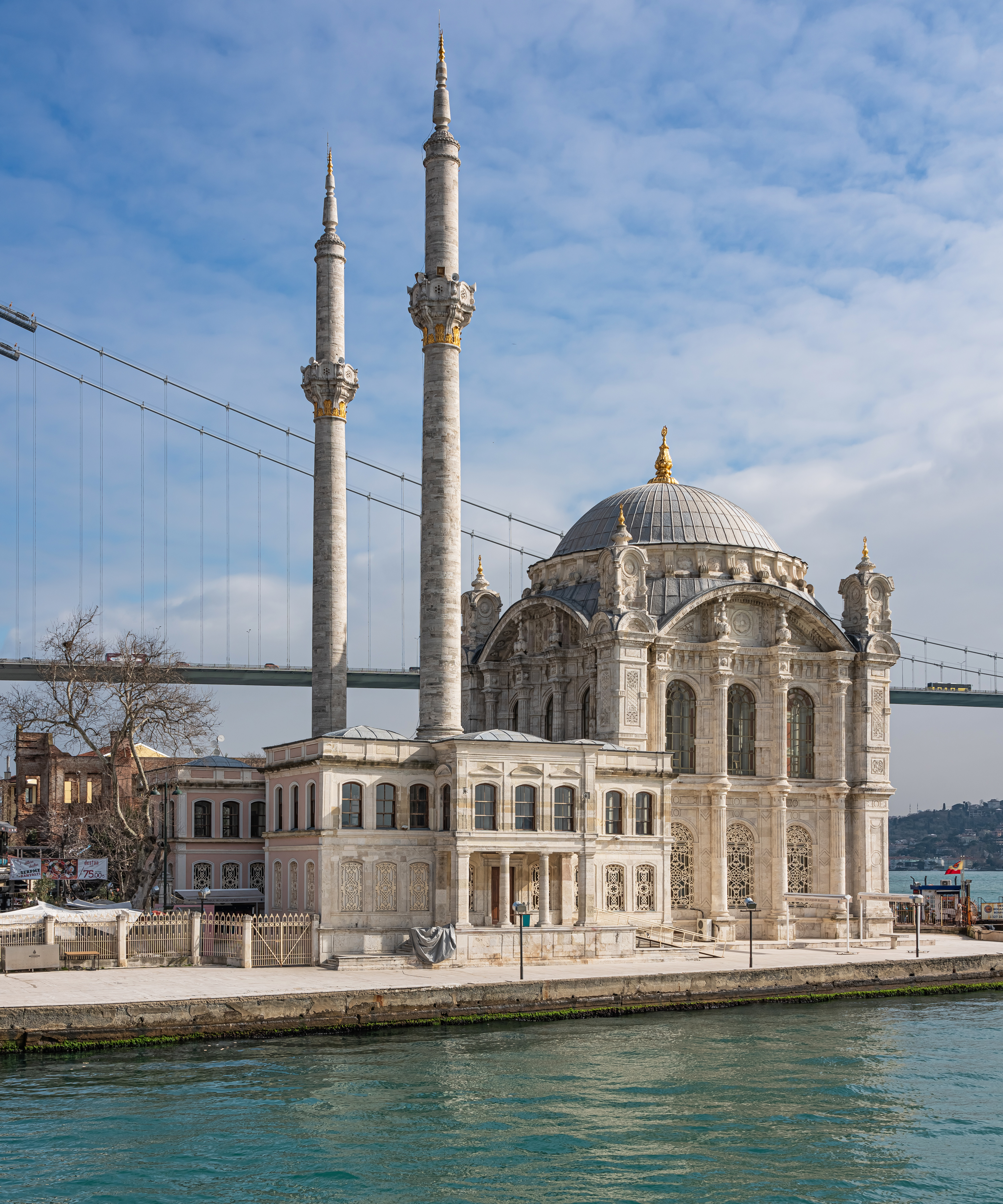
Exterior, with imperial apartments (left) and the domed prayer hall (right)

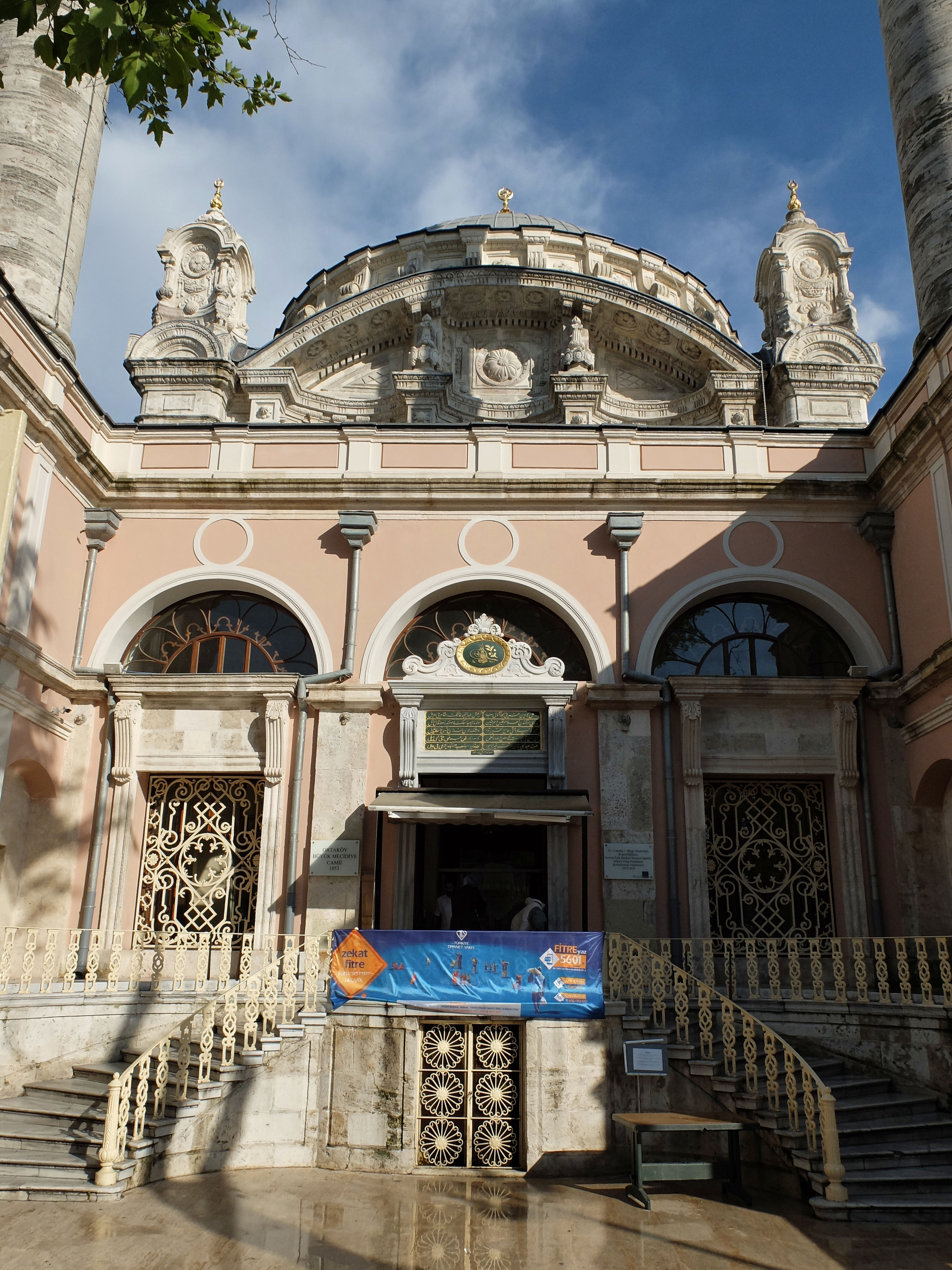
Front façade and entrance

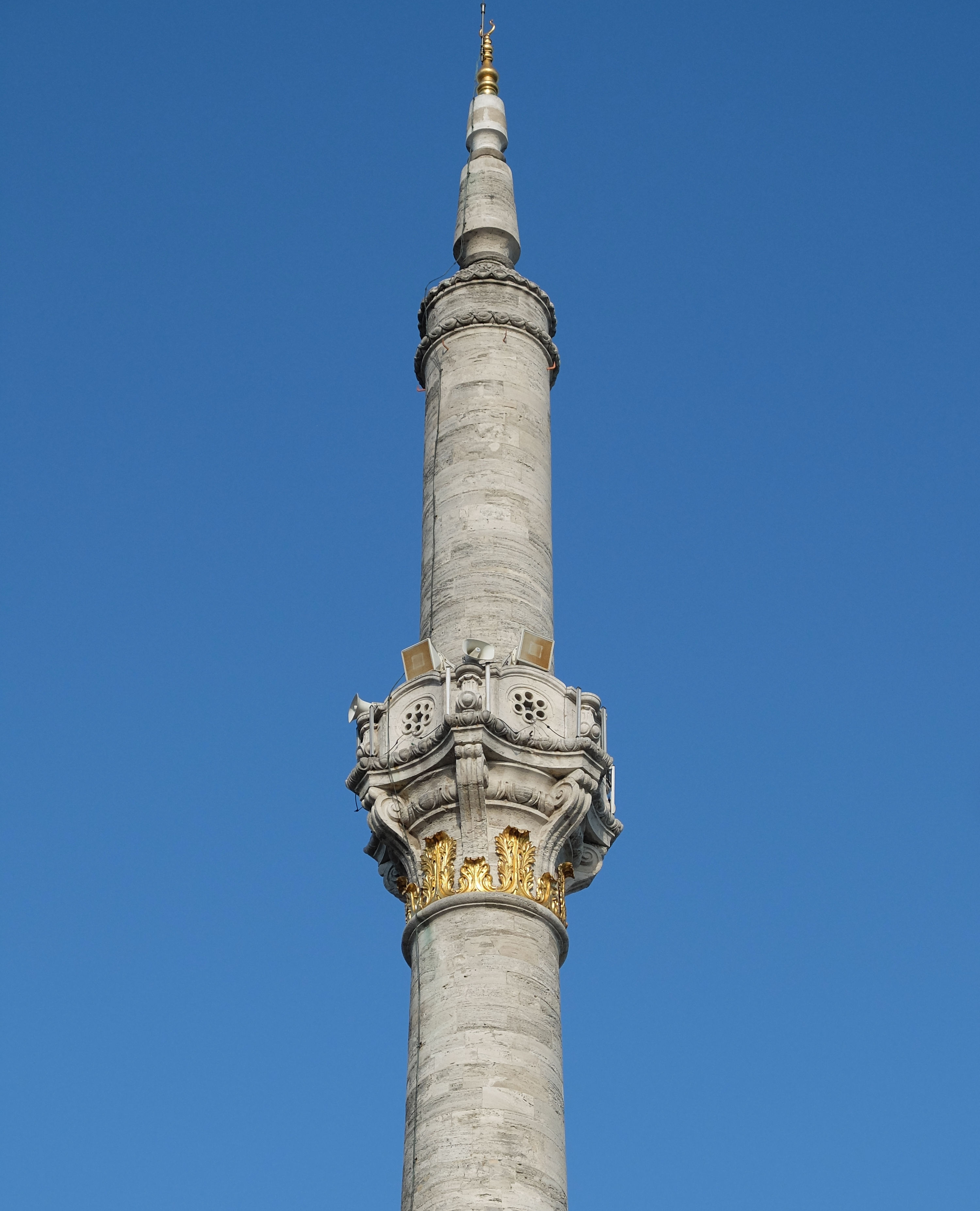
Detail of the minarets

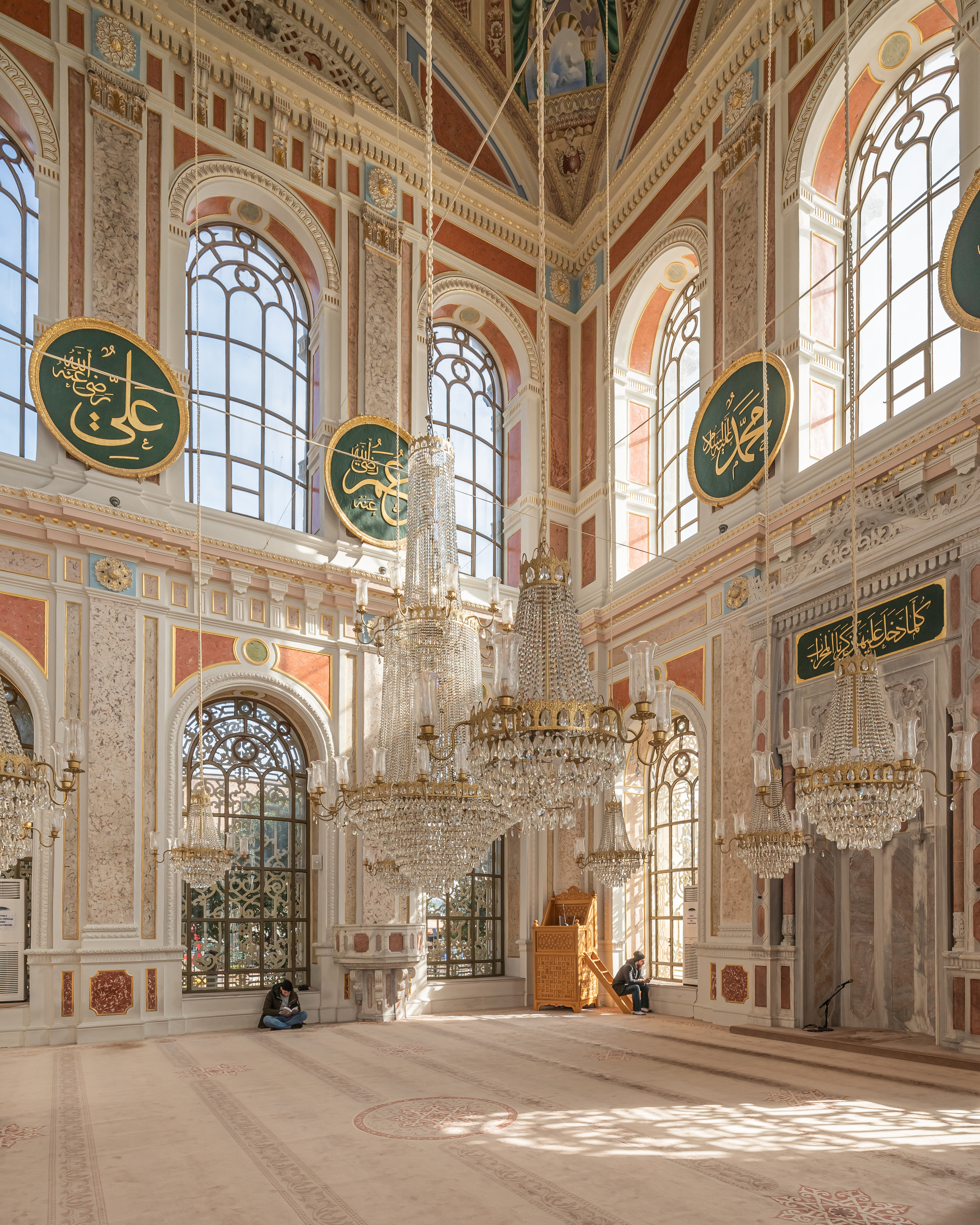
Interior of the mosque

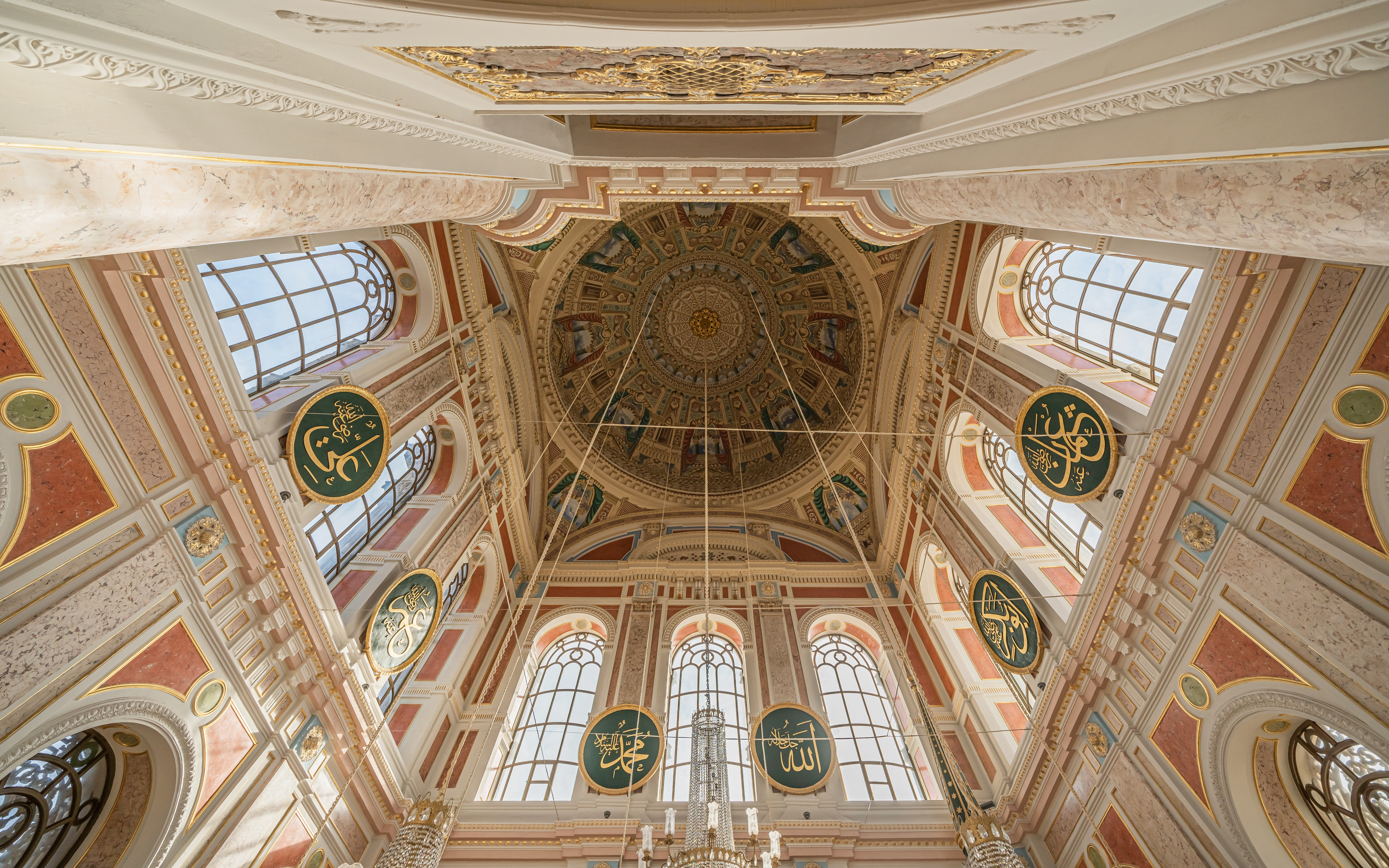
Interior of the mosque, looking up at the dome

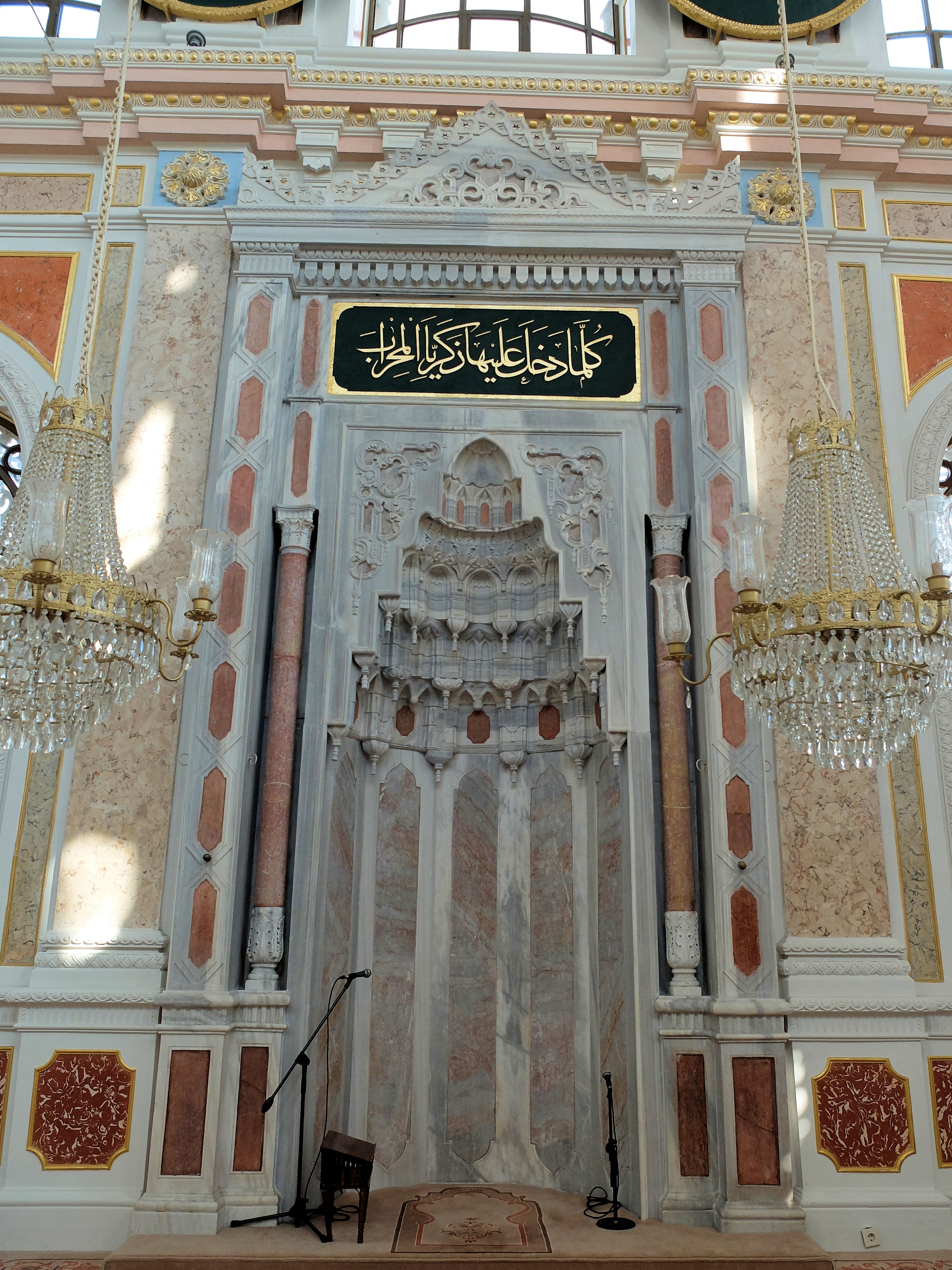
Mihrab of the mosque

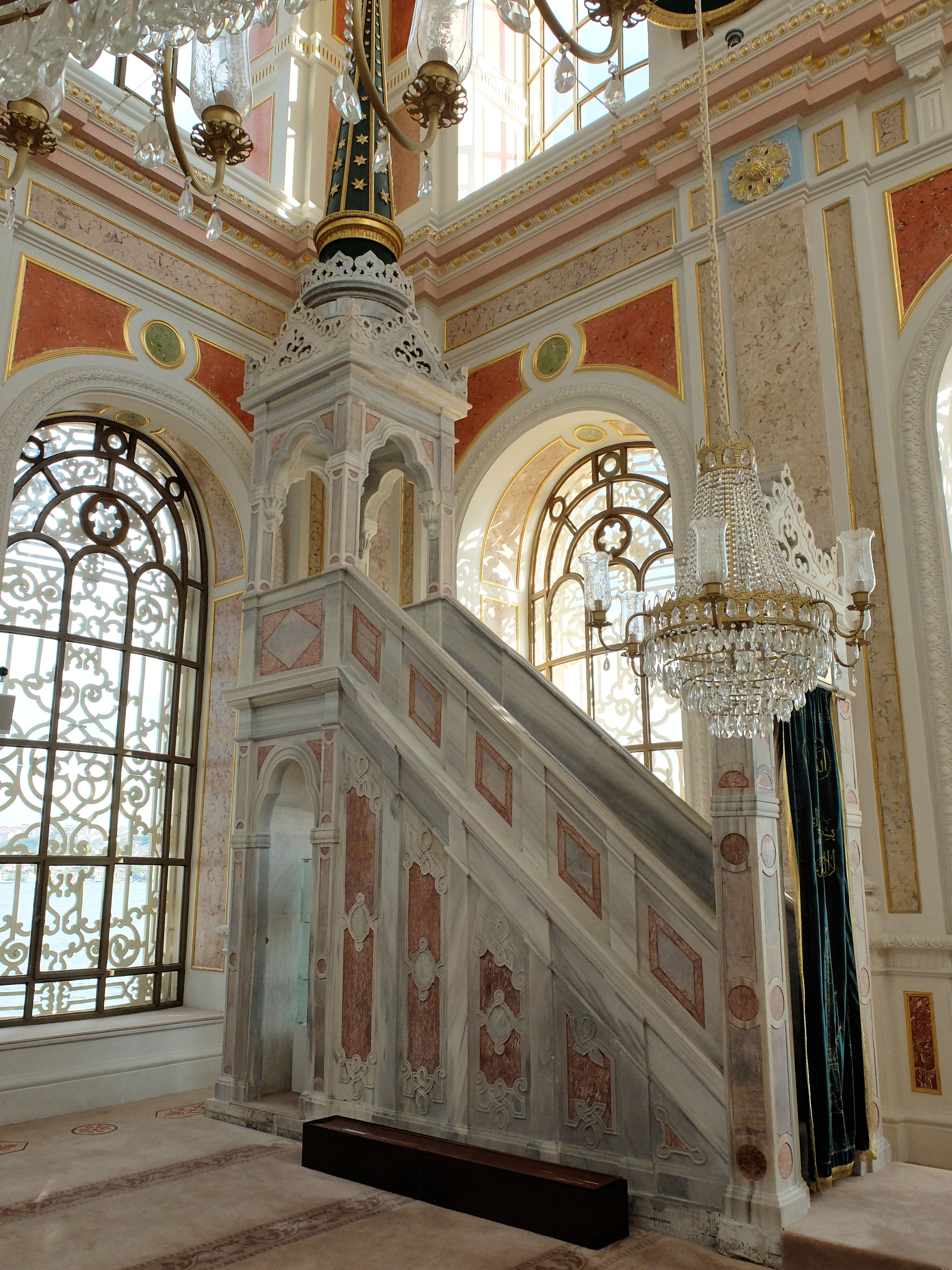
Minbar of the mosque
