= Küçük Mecidiye Mosque =

Mosque in Beşiktaş, Istanbul, Turkey

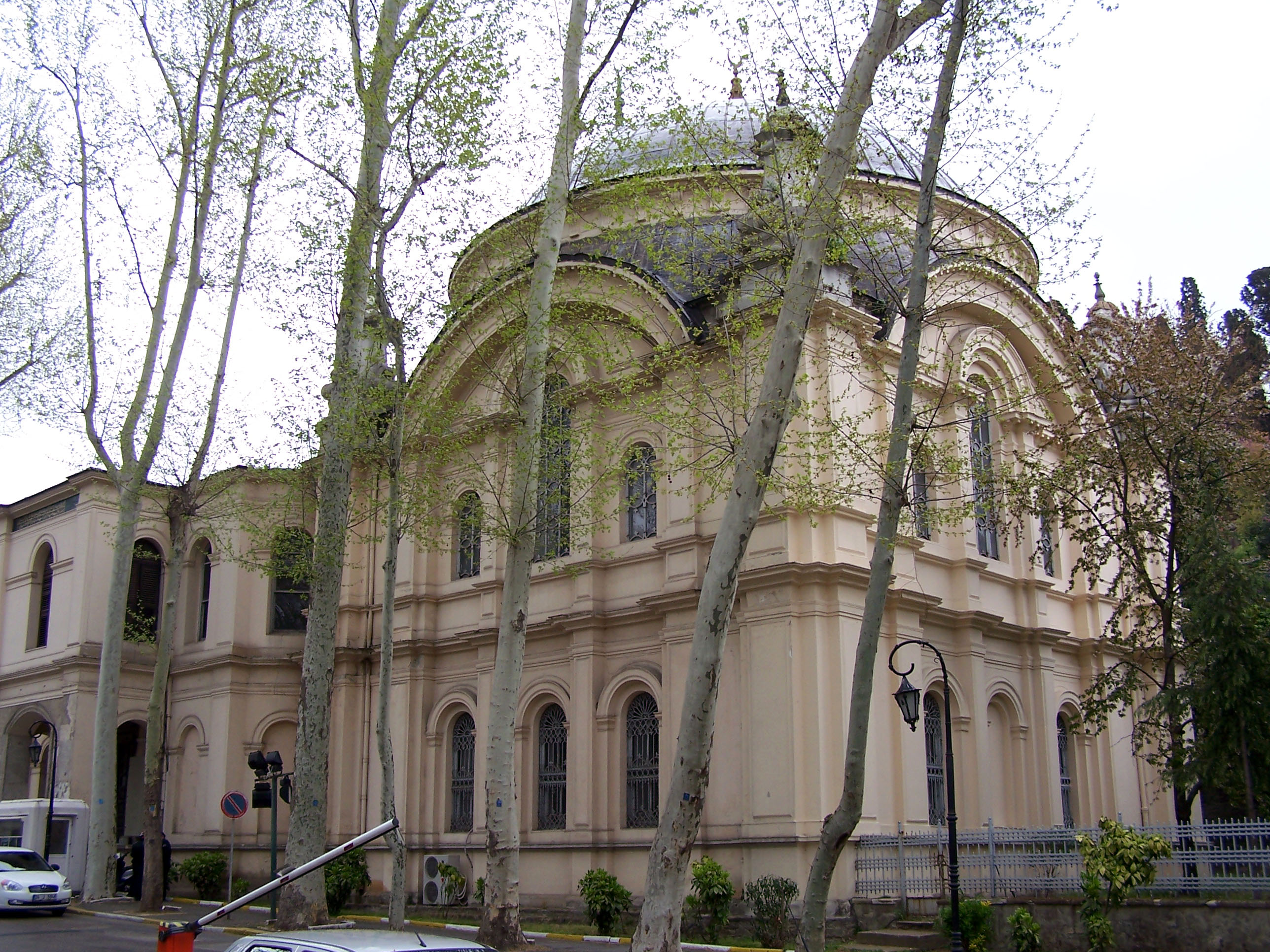

Religion
- Affiliation: Islam

Location
- Location: Istanbul, Turkey
- Interactive map of Küçük Mecidiye Mosque
- Coordinates: 41.045280°N 29.017017°E

Architecture
- Architect: Nigoğos Balyan
- Type: mosque
- Style: Ottoman architecture
- Groundbreaking: 1843
- Completed: 1848
- Minaret: 1

The Küçük Mecidiye Mosque (Turkish: Küçük Mecidiye Camii) is an Ottoman mosque in the Beşiktaş district of Istanbul, Turkey. It was built from the order of Sultan Abdülmecid I by Nigoğos Balyan, member of the Balyan family. The mosque is located on the Çırağan Street near the entrance to the Yıldız Park. Beşiktaş Police Station is located nearby, Çırağan Palace is across the street.

== See also ==
- Islamic architecture
- List of mosques
- Ottoman architecture
