= Ortaköy =

District in Istanbul, Turkey

- Neighbourhood
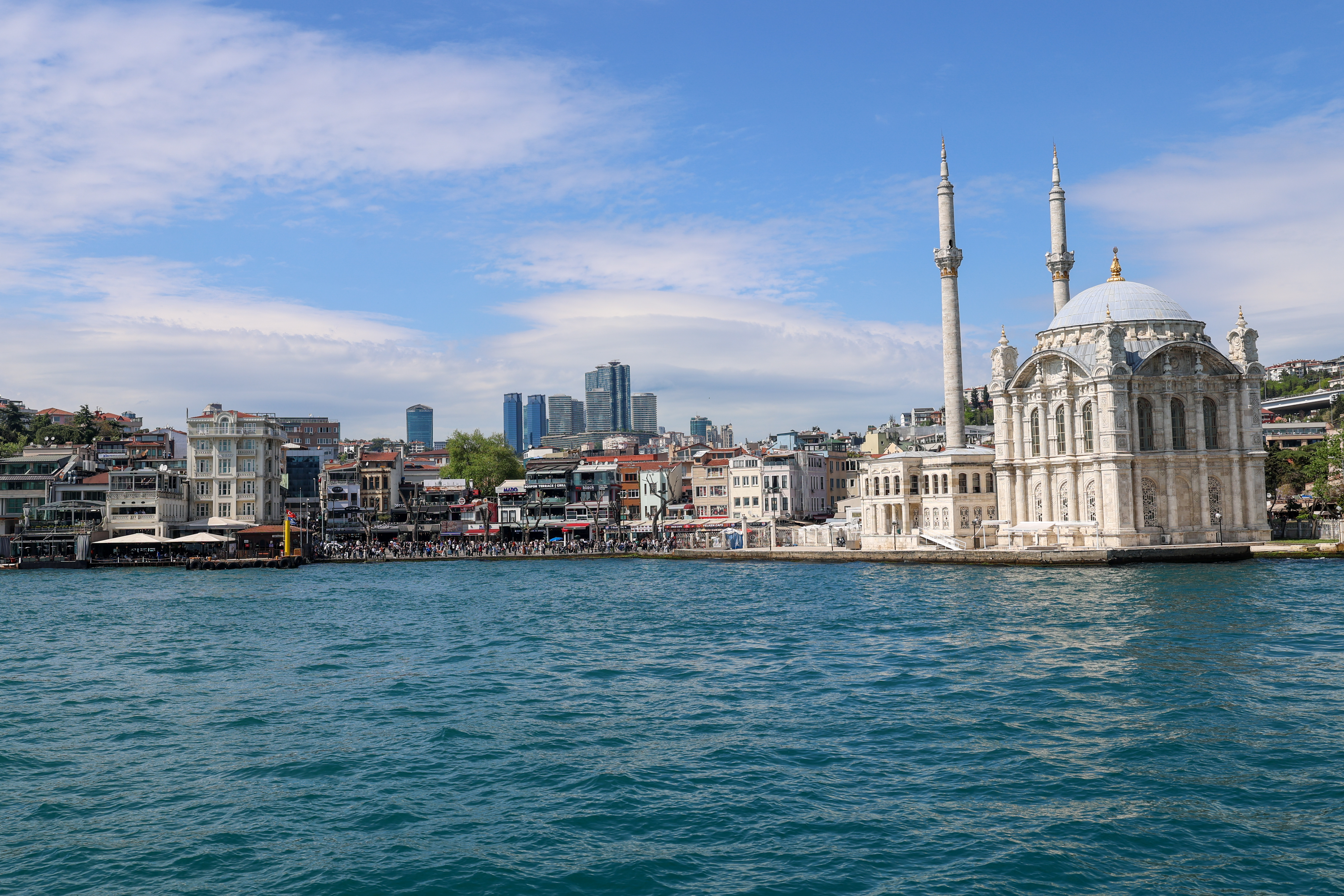
- Ortaköy Square and Ortaköy Mosque in Istanbul, Turkey

- Location within Turkey Location within Istanbul
- Coordinates: 41°02′53″N 29°01′25″E
- Country: Turkey
- Province: Istanbul
- District: Beşiktaş
- Population (2024): 9,121
- Time zone: UTC+3 (TRT)

Ortaköy (Turkish pronunciation: [oɾˈtaˈcœj], lit. Middle Village) is a neighbourhood in the municipality and district of Beşiktaş, Istanbul Province, Turkey. Its population is 9,121 (2024). It is on the European shore of the Bosphorus.

There are several educational institutions, such as Kabataş Erkek Lisesi and Galatasaray University, in Ortaköy.

== History ==
During the 19th century the British writer Emilia Hornby rented a house in Ortaköy and left a vivid description of life there in her Constantinople During the Crimean War, published in 1863.

The German architect Bruno Taut lived in a hillside house above Ortaköy that combined Japanese and European architectural styles to reflect his life in exile.

US President George W. Bush gave a speech in Ortaköy at the Galatasaray University during the 2004 NATO Summit.

=== Terrorism ===
On 1 January 2017, Ortaköy was the scene of a deadly terrorist attack at the Reina nightclub, where hundreds of people were celebrating the New Year. Thirty-nine people lost their lives. The club was closed down and demolished in May 2017.

== Attractions ==
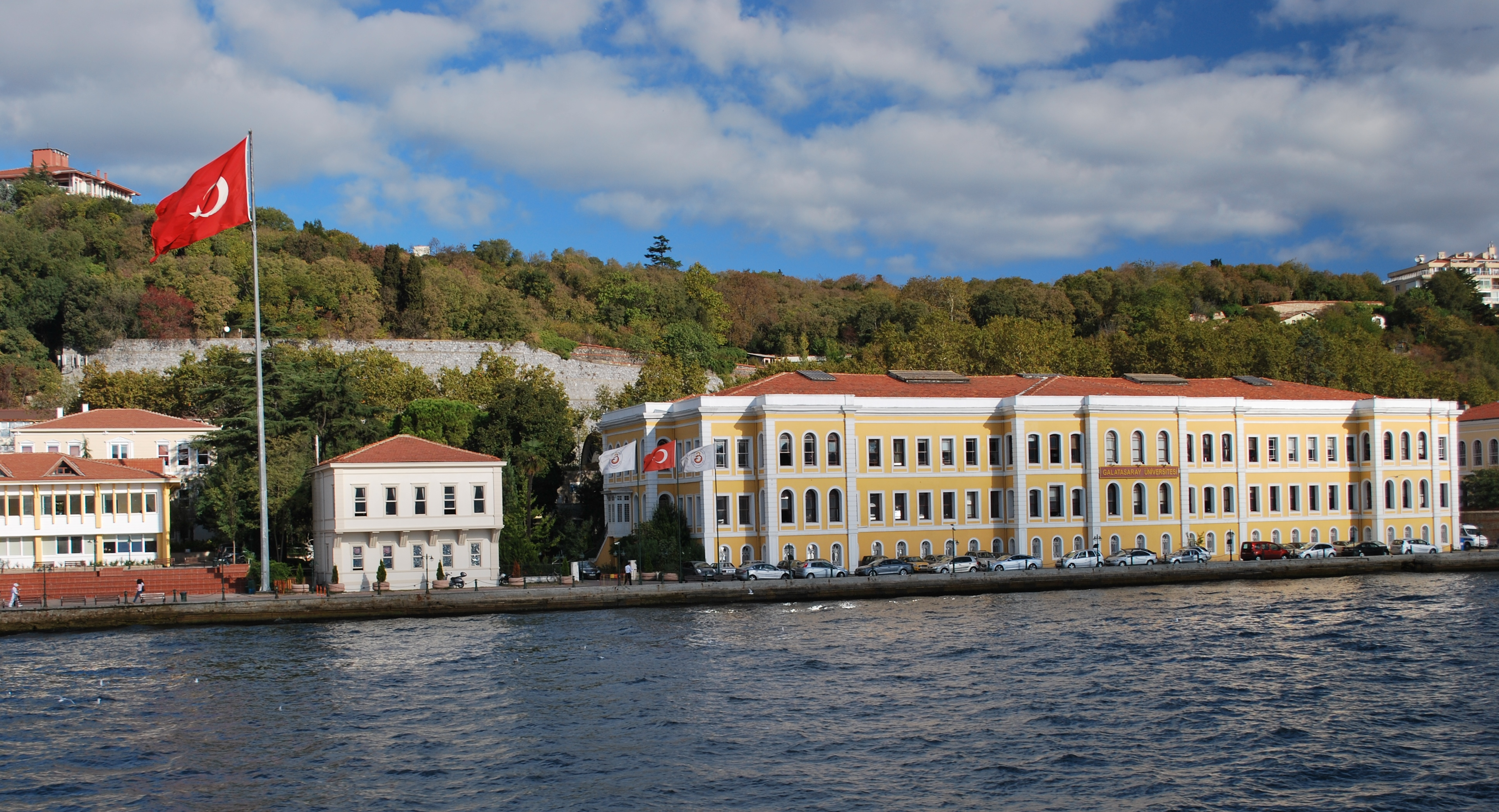
the Galatasaray University as seen from the Bosphorus

Ortaköy Mosque is a particularly beautiful Neo-Baroque structure right beside the Bosphorus and visible from passing boats.The first version of the mosque was built in the 18th century but the current mosque, commissioned by Sultan Abdülmecid I and designed by architects (father and son) Garabet Amira Balyan and Nigoğayos Balyan in Neo-Baroque style, was built between 1854 and 1856.

The mosque is very close to the European pylon of the Bosphorus Bridge (now officially renamed the 15 July Martyrs Bridge), one of the three bridges that connect the European and Asian banks of İstanbul.

The Esma Sultan Mansion (1875) also stands near the Bosphorus Bridge. An Ottoman-era yalı presented to Esma Sultan as a wedding gift by her father Sultan Abdülaziz, it was badly damaged by a fire in 1975. then renovated in the 1990s by The Marmara Hotels group. In 2001 it opened as a multipurpose event venue. The exterior of the burnt historic building was left untouched, creating an interesting contrast with its modern interior.

=== Çıragan Palace ===
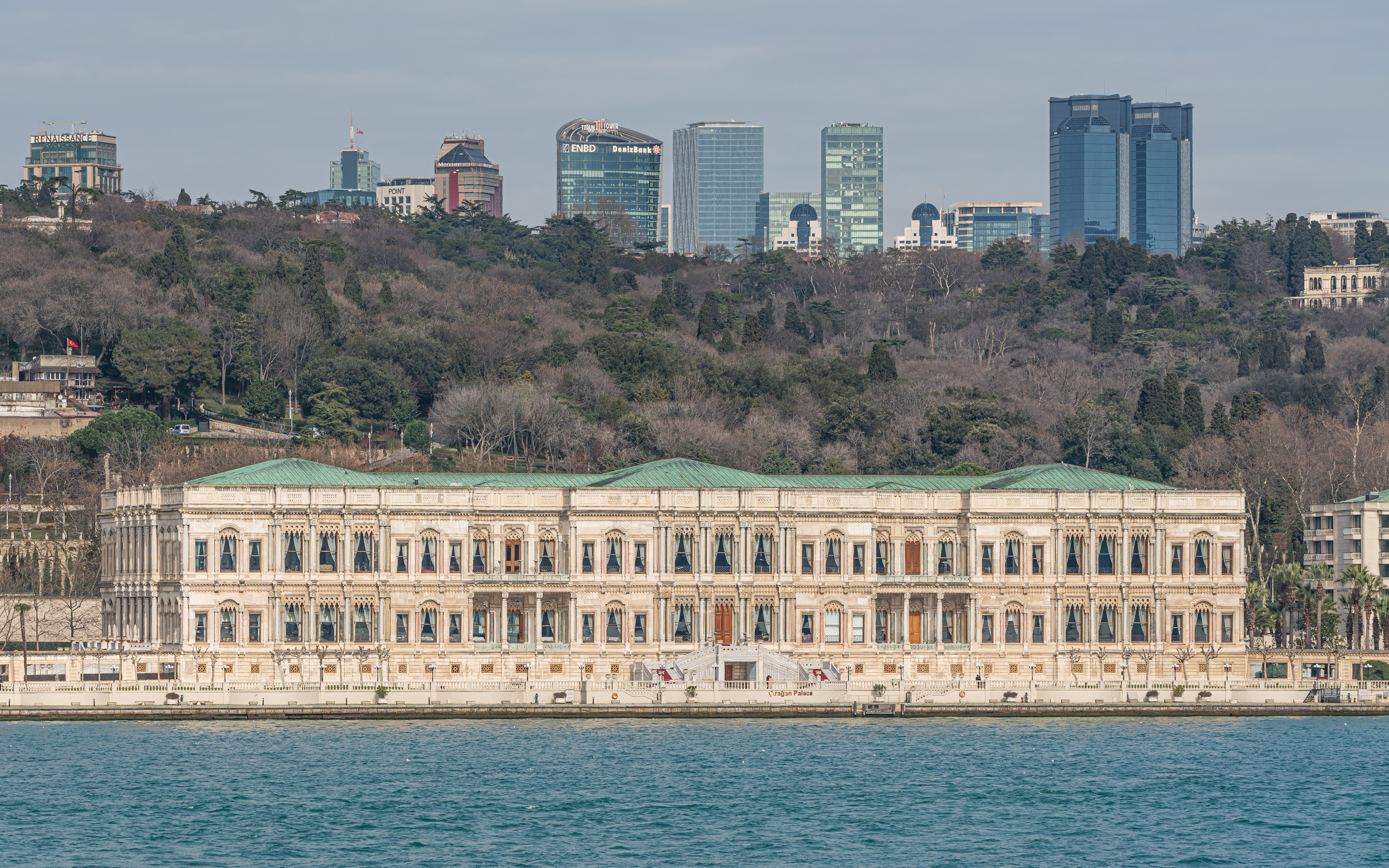
the Çırağan Palace as seen from the Bosphorus

In 1871, Sultan Abdülaziz built the Çırağan Palace which stands beside the Bosphorus between Beşiktaş and Ortaköy. The sultan lived in the palace for some time and it was later used as a place of imprisonment for other members of the imperial family. Later the Palace was used to house the Ottoman Parliament until it was badly damaged by a fire in 1910. Repaired and restored in the 1980s, it is now the Çırağan Palace Kempinski Istanbul Hotel, one of Istanbul's most luxurious hotels.

== Sports ==
The local sports club is Ortaköy Spor Kulübü.

== See also ==
- Emirgan
- Rumelihisarı
