= Timeline of Istanbul =

The following is a timeline of the history of the city of Istanbul, Turkey.

== Prior to 4th century ==
- 657 BCE – Byzantium founded by Greeks.
- 513 BCE – City taken by Persians under the rule of Darius the Great.
- 479 BCE – Spartans take control of Byzantium from the Persians following their victory at the Battle of Plataea.
- 411 BCE – Captured by Sparta.
- 408 BCE – Captured by Athens.
- 340 BCE – Besieged unsuccessfully by the forces of Philip II of Macedon.
- 317 BCE – Battle of Byzantium.
- 193 CE
  - Besieged by Septimius Severus.
  - Population: 15,000
- 196 – Captured by Septimius Severus. Walls demolished and city razed.
- 203
  - Septimius Severus rebuilds the city.
  - Hippodrome built (approximate date).
  - Mese main street built.
  - Baths of Zeuxippus built (approximate date).
  - Walls rebuilt (approximate date).
- 267 – Captured by the Herules.

== 4th–15th centuries ==
- 315 – Hagia Irene church built (approximate date).
- 324
  - 8 November: Constantine renames the city as Constantinoupolis and begins large-scale rebuilding.
  - Serpent Column relocated to Byzantium.
  - Hippodrome enlarged.
  - Population: 20,000
- 328 – 4 November: Constantine dedicates Constantinople as capital.
- 330
  - 11 May: Column of Constantine dedicated.
  - Church of the Holy Apostles built (approximate date).
  - Chora Church built (approximate date).
  - Milion erected (approximate date).
- 332
  - 18 May: Free distribution of food to citizens. 80,000 rations a day from 117 distribution points.
- 359 – First urban prefect appointed.
- 360 – 15 February: Great Church of Holy Wisdom inaugurated.
- 362 – Kontoskalion built.
- 365 – City taken by forces of Procopius.
- 368
  - Valens Aqueduct completed.
  - Magnaura palace built (approximate date).
  - Population: 150,000
- 378 – Battle of Constantinople (378): Gothic attack on the city.
- 381 – First Council of Constantinople held in the Hagia Irene church.
- 382
  - Drought.
  - Second line added to the Valens Aqueduct.
- 390 – Obelisk of Theodosius installed.
- 393
  - Forum of Theodosius rebuilt.
  - Column of Theodosius erected.
  - Arch of Theodosius completed.
  - Population: 200,000
- 395 – Earthquake (approximate date).
- 400 – City occupied by the rebel forces of Gainas for several months.
- 401 – Construction of the Column of Arcadius begins.
- 403
  - Forum of Arcadius built.
  - Column of Aelia Eudoxia erected.
  - Earthquake.
- 407 – 1 April: Earthquake.
- 413 – Theodosian Walls built.
- 415 – 10 October: Church of Theodosius II inaugurated.
- 420 – Palace of Lausus built (approximate date).
- 421 – Cistern of Aetius built.
- 425 – 27 February: Pandidakterion school founded by emperor Theodosius II.
- 428 – Theodosius Cistern built (approximate date).
- 430 – Palace of Antiochos built.
- 433 – August: Fire destroys buildings along the Golden Horn.
- 437 – 25 September: Constantinian and Theodosian Walls damaged by an earthquake.
- 439 – Boukoleon Palace built (approximate date).
- 440 – Saint Andrew in Krisei built (approximate date).
- 447
  - 26 January: Walls damaged by an earthquake.
  - Walls rebuilt in 60 days by 16,000 workers under praetorian prefect Constantinus.
  - 6 November: Constantinian and Theodosian Walls damaged by an earthquake.
- 450
  - Column of Marcian erected (approximate date).
  - Church of St. Mary of Blachernae built.
- 459
  - Construction of the Cistern of Aspar begins.
  - Augustaion rebuilt.
- 462 – Monastery of Stoudios founded.
- 464 – September: Fire begins in the dockyards of the Golden Horn and damages eight of the city's fourteen regions.
- 473 – Imperial Library of Constantinople burned.
- 476 – Basilica Cistern rebuilt (approximate date).
- 478 – 25 September: Walls damaged by an earthquake.
- 498 – Riot by the Greens damages the Hippodrome and surrounding area.
- 500
  - Cistern of Mocius built (approximate date).
  - Palace of Blachernae built (approximate date).
  - Byzantine structure that would become the Balaban Aga Mosque built (approximate date).
- 524 – Church of St. Polyeuctus built.
- 527 – Construction of the Church of the Saints Sergius and Bacchus begins.
- 532
  - January: Nika riots.
  - 23 February: Construction of the Hagia Sophia church begins.
  - Basilica Cistern rebuilt and enlarged.
- 533 – Earthquake.
- 536 – Church of the Saints Sergius and Bacchus finished.
- 537
  - 26 December: Hagia Sophia completed.
  - Population: 300,000–500,000
- 541 – Plague of Justinian kills 40% of the population.
- 543 – Column of Justinian erected.
- 545 – Wheat and wine shortage.
- 548 – Hagia Irene rebuilt.
- 550 – 28 June: Church of the Holy Apostles rebuilt.
- 553 – Second Council of Constantinople held.
- 554 – 16 August: 554 Anatolia earthquake.
- 555 – May–July: Bread shortage.
- 557 – 14 December: 557 Constantinople earthquake destroys large parts of the city.
- 558 – February–July: Re-occurrence of the plague of Justinian.
- 560 – Monastery of the Mother of God at the Spring built.
- 562 – November: Drought.
- 570
  - Chrysotriklinos built by emperor Justin II (approximate date).
  - Orphanage of Saint Paul founded (approximate date).
- 573–574 – Re-occurrence of the plague of Justinian.
- 575 – Kontoskalion harbor deepened and enlarged.
- 576 – Valens Aqueduct repaired and expanded.
- 582 – Famine.
- 586 – Re-occurrence of the plague of Justinian.
- 599 – Re-occurrence of the plague of Justinian.
- 626 – Siege of Constantinople (626) by Avars, Slavs and Sassanian Persians.
- 674–678 – Siege of Constantinople (674–78).
- 680 – Third Council of Constantinople held.
- 690 – Hall of Justinianos built by emperor Justinian II (approximate date).
- 692 – Quinisext Council held.
- 698 – Outbreak of plague.
- 717–718 – Siege of Constantinople (717–18).
- 740 – October 26: 740 Constantinople earthquake.
- 747 – Outbreak of plague.
- 753 – Hagia Irene rebuilt.
- 758 – Drought.
- 766 – Valens Aqueduct restored.
- 769 – Church of the Virgin of the Pharos in existence.
- 813 – City besieged by Bulgarian forces.
- 821 – City besieged by forces of Thomas the Slav.
- 860 – Siege of Constantinople (860).
- 869 – A portion of the walls collapses in an earthquake.
- 870 – Fourth Council of Constantinople (Catholic Church) held.
- 880
  - Fourth Council of Constantinople (Eastern Orthodox) held.
  - 1 May: Nea Ekklesia built.
- 907 – Siege of Constantinople (907).
- 908 – Lips Monastery built.
- 920 – Myrelaion built.
- 922 – Battle of Constantinople (922).
- 941 – Siege of Constantinople (941).
- 971 – Church of Christ of the Chalke built by emperor John I Tzimiskes.
- 1000 – Hagios Theodoros built (approximate date).
- 1030 – Monastery of St. Mary Peribleptos built by emperor Romanos III Argyros.
- 1045 – Monastery of St. George of Mangana built (approximate date).
- 1047 – September: Siege by rebels under Leo Tornikios.
- 1049 — Theotokos Euergetis Monastery founded.
- 1059 – Saint Thekla of the Palace of Blachernae built.
- 1060 – Pammakaristos Church built (approximate date).
- 1081 – Chora Church rebuilt.
- 1087 – Monastery of Christ Pantepoptes built.
- 1100
  - Paper in use.
  - Saint John the Forerunner by-the-Dome built.
- 1110
  - Kecharitomene Monastery built.
  - Maiden's Tower built.
- 1136 – Monastery of the Pantocrator completed.
- 1147 – September: Battle of Constantinople (1147)
- 1181 – 2 May: Uprising of Maria Komnene against the rule of Alexios Komnenos suppressed.
- 1182 – April: Massacre of the Latins.
- 1197 – 25 July: Fire destroys the Latin Quarter and other buildings.
- 1200 – Theotokos Kyriotissa built (approximate date).
- 1203 – Siege of Constantinople (1203) by the Fourth Crusade, in which Alexius IV was able to usurp the throne after Alexius III fled to Thrace.
- 1204 – April: Siege of Constantinople (1204) by the Fourth Crusade, in which the Byzantines were overwhelmed and the city thoroughly sacked.
- 1235 – Siege of Constantinople (1235).
- 1260 – Siege of Constantinople (1260).
- 1261
  - 25 July: Captured by Nicaean forces under Alexios Strategopoulos.
  - Population: 35,000
- 1268 – Kyra Martha nunnery founded.
- 1289 – June: Earthquake.
- 1304 – South Church of Lips Monastery built.
- 1307 – Monastery of Christ Philanthropos built.
- 1325 – Church of San Domenico built.
- 1332 – 17 January: Earthquake.
- 1347
  - 14 October: Earthquake.
  - 18 October: Earthquake.
- 1348
  - Galata Tower built.
  - Population: 80,000
- 1351 – 28 May: Fifth Council of Constantinople completed.
- 1376 – City besieged by forces of Andronikos IV Palaiologos.
- 1394
  - Blockade of the city begun by Ottoman forces under Bayezid I.
  - Anadoluhisarı fortress built.

== 15th–18th centuries ==
- 1402
  - Ottoman blockade lifted.
  - Earthquake.
- 1410 – June: Battle of Kosmidion.
- 1411 – Siege of Constantinople (1411).
- 1422 – Siege of Constantinople (1422).
- 1427 – Church of Saint Benoit built.
- 1437
  - 4 September: Earthquake.
  - 25 November: Earthquake.
- 1452 – Rumelihisarı fortress built.
- 1453
  - 6 April-29 May: Final Siege of Constantinople; City besieged by Ottoman forces; Mehmed II in power.
  - Capital of the Ottoman Empire relocated to Constantinople from Edirne.
  - Hagia Sophia (converted from Orthodox cathedral to mosque) in use.
  - Medrese predecessor of Istanbul University established.
  - Population: 40,000–50,000
- 1454
  - 18 April: Treaty of Constantinople (1454)
  - Imperial Arsenal established.
  - Phanar Greek Orthodox College founded.
  - Ağa hamamı built.
- 1458
  - Yedikule Fortress built.
  - Eyüp Sultan Mosque built.
- 1460 – Grand Bazaar built (approximate date).
- 1465 – Topkapı Palace construction begins.
- 1467 – Turkish State Mint established.
- 1470
  - Fatih Mosque built.
  - Sahn-ı Seman Medrese established.
- 1471 – Rum Mehmed Pasha Mosque built.
- 1472 – Tiled Kiosk built.
- 1478 – Galata Mosque in use.
- 1479 – 25 January: Treaty of Constantinople (1479)
- 1481 – Galatasaray High School established.
- 1488 – Complex of Sultan Bayezid II built.
- 1491 – Firuz Agha Mosque built in Fatih.
- 1497 – Gazi Atik Ali Pasha Mosque built.
- 1505 – İskender Pasha Mosque, Fatih built (approximate date).
- 1506 – Bayezid II Mosque built.
- 1509 – 1509 Constantinople earthquake.
- 1512 – Vasat Atik Ali Pasha Mosque built.
- 1520 – Suleiman the Magnificent becomes Sultan of the Ottoman Empire.
- 1521 – Ibrahim Pasha Palace in use.
- 1528 – Yavuz Selim Mosque built.
- 1531 – Piri Mehmed Pasha Mosque built.
- 1533 – 22 July: Treaty of Constantinople (1533).
- 1535 – French embassy established.
- 1539 – Haseki Sultan Complex built.
- 1541 – Tomb of Hayreddin Barbarossa built.
- 1542 – Defterdar Mosque built.
- 1548
  - Mihrimah Sultan Mosque (Üsküdar) built.
  - Şehzade Mosque built.
- 1550
  - Mosque with the Spiral Minaret built.
  - Yavuz Sultan Selim Madras built.
- 1551 – Hadim Ibrahim Pasha Mosque built.
- 1554 – Coffee house in business.
- 1555 – November/December: Sinan Pasha Mosque (Istanbul) built.
- 1556 – Bath-house of Haseki Hurrem Sultan built.
- 1557
  - Süleymaniye Mosque built.
  - Süleymaniye Hamam bath built.
- 1559 – Caferağa Medresseh built.
- 1560 – İskender Pasha Mosque, Kanlıca built.
- 1563 – Rüstem Pasha Mosque built.
- 1567 – Sokollu Mehmed Pasha Mosque (Büyükçekmece) built.
- 1570 – Mihrimah Sultan Mosque (Edirnekapı) built.
- 1571 – Sokollu Mehmed Pasha Mosque (Kadırga) built.
- 1572 – Kara Ahmed Pasha Mosque built.
- 1573 – Piyale Pasha Mosque built.
- 1577 – Observatory of Taqi al-Din built.
- 1578 – Sokollu Mehmed Pasha Mosque (Azapkapı) built.
- 1580 – Kılıç Ali Pasha Complex built.
- 1581 – Şemsi Pasha Mosque built.
- 1583 – 26 March: First British ambassador to Constantinople arrives.
- 1584
  - Çemberlitaş Hamamı (bath) built.
  - Molla Çelebi Mosque built.
  - Church of St. Mary Draperis, Istanbul established.
- 1586
  - Atik Valide Mosque built.
  - Mesih Mehmed Pasha Mosque built.
- 1590
  - 21 March: Treaty of Constantinople (1590).
  - Zal Mahmud Pasha Mosque built.
- 1604 – Church of SS Peter and Paul, Istanbul built.
- 1612 – 20 November: Treaty of Nasuh Pasha.
- 1613 – Aynalıkavak Palace built.
- 1615 – Cossack raid on Istanbul (1615)
- 1616 – Sultan Ahmed Mosque built.
- 1620 – Cossack raid on Istanbul (1620)
- 1624 – Cossack raids on Istanbul (1624)
- 1648 – Atmeydanı incident.
- 1656 – 26 February: Çınar incident.
- 1660
  - 24–26 July: Great Fire of 1660.
  - New Bazaar built.
- 1665 – Valide Sultan Mosque built.
- 1678 – Church of St. Mary Draperis rebuilt.
- 1700 – 13 July: Treaty of Constantinople (1700).
- 1710 – Yeni Valide Mosque built.
- 1728 – Fountain of Ahmed III built.
- 1729 – Fountain of Ahmed III (Üsküdar) built.
- 1730 – 20 September: Patrona Halil rebellion.
- 1732 – Tophane Fountain built.
- 1736 – 24 September: Treaty of Constantinople (1736).
- 1742 – 15 April: Apostolic Vicariate of Constantinople established.
- 1746 – Kalenderhane Mosque consecrated.
- 1753 – Yedikule Hospital founded.
- 1755 – Nuruosmaniye Mosque built.
- 1758 – Şemsipaşa Primary School established.
- 1763 – Laleli Mosque built.
- 1766 – Earthquake.
- 1769 – Zeynep Sultan Mosque built.
- 1771 – Fatih Mosque rebuilt.
- 1773 – Naval Engineering at Golden Horn Naval Shipyard college founded.
- 1774 – Rami Barracks built.
- 1781 – Emirgan Mosque built.
- 1793 – Balıklı Greek Hospital rebuilt.
- 1795
  - Imperial School of Military Engineering established.
  - Mühendishane-i Berri Hümayun printing house established.

== 19th century ==
- 1800 – Eyüp Sultan Mosque rebuilt.
- 1801 – Big Selimiye Mosque built.
- 1806 – Taksim Military Barracks built.
- 1807 – 29 May: Coup of 1807.
- 1808 – 28 July: Coup of 1808.
- 1813 – Hidayet Mosque built.
- 1814 – Sultan Mahmut Fountain built.
- 1821 – Constantinople massacre of 1821.
- 1825 – Pangaltı Mkhitaryan School established.
- 1826
  - 15 June: Auspicious Incident.
  - Nusretiye Mosque built.
- 1828
  - 6 February: Selimiye Barracks built.
  - Beyazıt Tower built.
- 1831 – October: Takvim-i Vekayi newspaper established.
- 1832
  - February: Treaty of Constantinople (1832).
  - Beylerbeyi Palace Tunnel built.
  - Davutpaşa Barracks built.
- 1833 – 8 July: Treaty of Hünkâr İskelesi.
- 1834
  - Military Academy established.
  - 31 May: Surp Pırgiç Armenian Hospital opened.
- 1836 – 3 September: Hayratiye Bridge built.
- 1837 – Surp Agop Hospital opened.
- 1843 – Church of SS Peter and Paul rebuilt.
- 1844 – Naum Theatre opened.
- 1845
  - Galata Bridge built.
  - 21 September: Mekteb-i Fünun-ı İdadiye military high school established.
- 1846
  - Cathedral of the Holy Spirit built.
  - 1 July: Armenian Evangelical Church established.
  - 23 July: House of Multiple Sciences established (predecessor of Istanbul University).
- 1848
  - Küçük Mecidiye Mosque built.
  - Nusretiye Clock Tower built.
  - Ottoman Military College established.
- 1849 – 9 October: Bulgarian St. Stephen Church inaugurated.
- 1850
  - 21 March: Istanbul Girls High School inaugurated.
  - 22 March: Cağaloğlu Anadolu Lisesi established.
- 1851
  - Hırka-i Şerif Mosque built.
  - Emirgan Pier opened.
- 1852
  - Taşkışla houses built.
  - Taksim German Hospital founded.
- 1853 – Üsküdar Ferry Terminal opened.
- 1854 – Teşvikiye Mosque built.
- 1855
  - Ihlamur Palace built.
  - Dolmabahçe Mosque built.
- 1856
  - 27 November: Lycée Notre Dame de Sion Istanbul established.
  - Dolmabahçe Palace built in Beşiktaş.
  - Ortaköy Mosque built.
  - Ottoman Bank founded.
  - Fenerbahçe Lighthouse built.
- 1857
  - Küçüksu Palace built.
  - Ahırkapı Feneri lighthouse built.
- 1859
  - 12 February: Mekteb-i Mülkiye-i Şahane college established.
  - Şişli Greek Orthodox Cemetery founded.
- 1861
  - 14 April: Bulgarian Catholic Apostolic Vicariate of Constantinople established.
  - Adile Sultan Palace built.
  - Al-Jawâ'ib begins publication.
  - Liceo Italiano di Istanbul founded.
- 1862 – Tekel tobacco company founded.
- 1863
  - 16 September: Robert College opened.
  - First painting exhibition sponsored by Sultan Abdülaziz.
- 1865
  - Beylerbeyi Palace built.
  - Altunizade Mosque built.
- 1866 – Gedikpaşa Tiyatrosu theatre established.
- 1867 – Çırağan Palace built.
- 1868
  - 1 April: Court of Cassation established.
  - 1 May: Deutsche Schule Istanbul founded.
  - Kandilli Observatory established.
  - Galatasaray Museum established.
- 1870
  - June 5: Fire in Pera.
  - 24 November: Diyojen magazine founded.
  - Malta Kiosk built.
- 1871
  - Feriye Palace built.
  - American College for Girls established in Arnavutköy.
- 1872
  - Pertevniyal Valide Sultan Mosque built.
  - Haydarpaşa railway station opened.
  - Pertevniyal High School founded.
  - El Tiempo Ladino-language newspaper founded.
  - 22 July:
    - Bakırköy railway station opened.
    - Küçükçekmece railway station opened.
  - 27 July: Sirkeci railway station opened.
  - 22 September:
    - Bostancı railway station opened.
    - Erenköy railway station opened.
    - Feneryolu railway station opened.
    - Kartal railway station opened.
    - Küçükyalı railway station opened.
- 1873
  - 27 April: Fenerbahçe railway station opened.
  - Darüşşafaka High School founded.
- 1874 – Population: 827,750
- 1875
  - 17 January:
    - Beyoğlu (Tünel) railway station opened.
    - Karaköy (Tünel) railway station opened.
  - Esma Sultan Mansion built.
- 1876
  - 3 January: Akhtar Persian-language magazine established.
  - Muharrir magazine established.
  - Üsküdar American Academy founded.
  - Göztepe railway station built.
- 1877 – 18 December: Central Committee for Defending Albanian Rights formed.
- 1878
  - 26 June: Tercüman-ı Hakikat newspaper first published.
  - Istanbul Bar Association established.
- 1879
  - 12 October: Society for the Publication of Albanian Writings formed.
- 1880
  - 14 September: Hagia Triada Greek Orthodox Church, Istanbul built.
  - Yıldız Palace built.
- 1882
  - Palazzo Corpi built.
  - Ottoman Public Debt Administration building constructed.
  - School of Fine Arts established.
  - Numune-i Terakki school founded.
  - 14 January: Istanbul Chamber of Commerce established.
- 1883
  - School of Economics established.
  - Orient Express (Paris–Istanbul) begins operating.
  - Drita Albanian magazine begins publishing.
- 1886
  - 1 September: Getronagan Armenian High School established.
  - Yıldız Hamidiye Mosque built.
- 1887
  - Ertuğrul Tekke Mosque built.
  - Hidayet Mosque rebuilt.
- 1890
  - Yıldız Clock Tower built.
  - Kum Kapu demonstration.
  - Tekel Birası brewery established.
- 1891 – 13 June: Imperial Museum founded.
- 1892
  - Pera Palace Hotel built.
  - Mekteb-i Aşiret-i Humayun school established.
- 1893 – Zografeion Lyceum inaugurated.
- 1894
  - 10 July: an earthquake in the Gulf of İzmit kills about 1,349 people.
  - Pando's Creamery in business.
- 1895
  - Dolmabahçe Clock Tower built.
  - Russian Archaeological Institute of Constantinople established.
  - Lycée Sainte-Euphémie established.
- 1896
  - 1 January: Kurtuluş S.K. founded.
  - 26 August: Occupation of the Ottoman Bank.
- 1897
  - Treaty of Constantinople (1897).
  - Istanbul Naval Museum established.
  - Tokatlıyan Hotels built.
- 1899 – 20 April: Port of Haydarpaşa opened.

== 20th century ==
- 1900 – Port of Istanbul opened.
- 1901
  - 27 January: German Fountain inaugurated.
  - Ulus Sephardi Jewish Cemetery established.
- 1903
  - 4 March: Beşiktaş J.K. founded.
  - Moda F.C. founded.
- 1904
  - Istanbul Football League established.
  - Elpis F.C. founded.
  - HMS Imogene F.C. founded.
- 1905
  - 21 July: Yıldız assassination attempt.
  - 30 October: Galatasaray S.K. founded.
- 1907
  - 3 May: Fenerbahçe S.K. (football) founded.
  - Khedive Palace built.
  - Etfal Hospital Clock Tower built.
- 1908
  - Istanbul declared a province with nine constituent districts.
  - Ottoman National Olympic Society founded.
  - Şükrü Saracoğlu Stadium inaugurated.
  - Kabataş Erkek Lisesi established.
  - Karagöz magazine established.
  - Osmanischer Lloyd established.
  - Demet magazine established.
  - Jamanak Armenian-language newspaper established.
  - El Gugeton Ladino-language newspaper established.
  - Vefa S.K. founded.
  - Beykoz S.K.D. founded.
  - Üsküdar Anadolu S.K. founded.
  - Strugglers F.C. founded.
- 1909
  - 31 March Incident
  - National Bank of Turkey established.
  - Scouting and Guiding Federation of Turkey predecessor formed.
  - Al-Muntada al-Adabi formed.
  - Shehbal magazine founded.
  - Altınordu İdman Yurdu S.K. founded.
- 1910
  - Mısır Apartment built.
  - Suadiye railway station opened.
  - Hamevasser newspaper established.
  - Apikoğlu company founded.
  - 22 April: Hikmet magazine established.
- 1911
  - Yıldız Technical University established.
  - Istanbul International Community School established.
  - Erenköy Girls High School established.
  - Marmnamarz sports magazine begins publishing.
  - Küçükçekmece S.K. founded.
  - Beylerbeyi S.K. founded.
  - Rumblers F.C. founded.
  - 11 June: Greek Byzantine Catholic Church established.
  - 23 July: Monument of Liberty, Istanbul completed.
- 1912
  - İnterbank moves to Constantinople.
  - Church of St. Anthony of Padua, Istanbul built.
  - Gülhane Park opens.
  - Orfeon Records established.
  - Istanbul Friday League established.
  - Hilal S.K. founded.
  - Telefoncular F.C. founded.
  - 25 March: Turkish Hearths founded.
- 1913
  - 23 January: 1913 Ottoman coup d'état.
  - 29 September: Treaty of Constantinople
  - Turkish and Islamic Arts Museum opens.
  - Bebek Mosque built.
  - Veliefendi Race Course opened.
  - Anadolu Hisarı İdman Yurdu S.K. founded.
- 1914
  - Population: 1,125,000
  - 25 January: Electric tram line begins operating on the European side.
  - 11 February: Silahtarağa Power Station opened.
  - 28 June: Darülbedayi founded.
  - Metrohan Building built.
  - Darülbedayi theatre founded.
  - Istanbul Championship League established.
  - Beyoğlu S.K. established.
- 1915
  - 24 April: Deportation of Armenian intellectuals on 24 April 1915.
  - 15 June: The 20 Hunchakian gallows hanging occurs in Beyazıt Square.
  - Göztepe railway station rebuilt.
- 1916
  - Aviation Martyrs' Monument completed.
  - Kandilli Anatolian High School for Girls established.
- 1917 – Darülelhan conservatory established.
- 1918
  - 13 November: Occupation of Constantinople by Allied forces begins, per Armistice of Mudros.
  - November: Karakol society founded against the occupation of Constantinople.
- 1919
  - Sultanahmet demonstrations.
  - Sultanahmet Jail built.
  - Eyüpspor founded.
- 1920 – 5 March: Green Crescent established.
- 1921
  - 15 January: Kasımpaşa S.K. founded.
  - Taksim Stadium established.
  - Istanbul Men's Volleyball League established.
- 1922 – Tayyare Apartments built.
- 1923
  - 4 October: Allied occupation ends and the newly-formed Republic of Turkey takes control.
  - 13 October: Turkish capital relocated from Istanbul to Ankara.
  - Vatan newspaper established.
  - Istanbul Maltepespor founded.
- 1924
  - 7 May: Cumhuriyet newspaper established.
  - 15 October: Bakırköy Psychiatric Hospital founded.
  - Airport opened in Yeşilköy.
  - Emek (movie theater) opened.
- 1925 – 12 July: Apoyevmatini Greek-language newspaper founded.
- 1926
  - 4 January: İstanbulspor founded.
  - Istanbul 4th Vakıf Han built.
  - Fatih Karagümrük S.K. founded.
- 1927
  - 6 March: Süreyya Opera House opened.
  - Istanbul Basketball League established.
  - Feriköy S.K. founded.
- 1928
  - Electric tram line begins operating on the Asian side.
  - Paşakapısı Prison established.
- 1929 – Istanbul Medical Chamber founded.
- 1930
  - City renamed "Istanbul".
  - Istanbul Shield established.
- 1931 – Italian Synagogue established.
- 1932 – Fil Bridge built.
- 1933
  - 1 August: Istanbul University established.
  - October: Güneş S.K. founded.
  - Istanbul Zoology Museum established.
- 1934 – 26 September: Haydarpaşa High School established.
- 1936 –
  - Istanbul University Observatory established.
  - Beşiktaş Atatürk Anadolu Lisesi high school founded.
- 1938 – 10 November: Death of Atatürk.
- 1940
  - 31 August: Marmara (newspaper) Armenian-language newspaper begins publishing.
  - Berlin–Baghdad railway begins operating.
  - Atatürk Bridge built.
  - Sarıyer S.K. founded.
  - Taksim S.K. founded.
  - Population: 789,346.
- 1942 –
  - VitrA (sanitaryware) company established.
  - Istanbul Football Cup established.
- 1943 – Taksim Gezi Park built.
- 1944
  - 22 February: Ülker company established.
  - Faculty of Arts and Sciences Building, Istanbul University built.
  - Yıldız Holding established.
- 1945
  - Population: 860,558.
  - Ali Sami Yen Stadium built.
  - Beyti (Istanbul) restaurant founded.
  - Aşiyan Museum established.
  - Yıldırım Bosna S.K. founded.
- 1946
  - Cezmi Or Memorial established.
  - Modaspor (basketball) founded.
- 1947
  - 19 May: İnönü Stadium opens in Beşiktaş.
  - 9 August: Cemil Topuzlu Open-Air Theatre opened.
  - 29 October: Şalom begins publishing.
- 1948
  - 1 May: Hürriyet newspaper begins publishing.
  - Bütün Dünya periodical begins publishing.
- 1949
  - 3 June: Istanbul Lütfi Kırdar International Convention and Exhibition Center opened.
  - 18 August: Kartal S.K. founded.
  - Şişli Mosque built.
  - İstanbul newspaper begins publishing.
  - Bakırköyspor founded.
- 1950
  - Population: 1,000,022.
  - 3 May: Milliyet begins publishing.
  - Hünkar (restaurant) established.
  - Pendikspor founded.
  - Paşabahçe S.K. founded.
  - Alibeyköy S.K. founded.
- 1951
  - 25 March: Neve Shalom Synagogue inaugurated.
  - Ismet Baba Fish Restaurant established.
- 1952
  - 9 March: ITU TV broadcast. First Turkish television broadcast.
  - Türk Ticaret Bankası relocated to Istanbul.
- 1953
  - 1 March: ITU School of Mines established.
  - Tiled Kiosk opens as a museum.
  - Zeytinburnuspor founded.
- 1954
  - Arçelik company established.
  - Alarko Holding company established.
  - Migros Türk company established.
  - İçmeler railway station opened.
  - Akbank moves to Istanbul.
  - Tuzlaspor founded.
- 1955
  - 10 June: Hilton Istanbul Bosphorus opened.
  - 6–7 September: Istanbul pogrom.
  - 4 December:
    - Cankurtaran railway station opened.
    - Florya railway station opened.
    - Kazlıçeşme railway station opened.
    - Yenimahalle railway station opened.
    - Zeytinburnu railway station opened.
  - Beko company founded.
  - Kadıköy Anadolu Lisesi founded.
  - Adam Mickiewicz Museum, Istanbul founded.
  - Küçükçekmece railway station rebuilt.
  - Istanbul Women's Volleyball League established.
- 1956
  - Divan Istanbul built.
  - Demirören Group founded.
  - Tekfen Construction and Installation founded.
  - Tabanlıoğlu Architects founded.
  - Yeşilyurt Women's Volleyball Team founded.
- 1957
  - Enka İnşaat ve Sanayi A.Ş. company founded.
  - Pudding Shop restaurant opened.
- 1958
  - Birleşik Fon Bankası founded.
  - Banks Association of Turkey founded.
  - Küçük Emek cinema opens.
- 1959
  - Beşiktaş Anadolu Lisesi founded.
  - Sait Faik Abasıyanık Museum opened.
  - Karaköy Pier opened.
  - Güzelyalı railway station opened.
  - Bayrampaşaspor founded.
- 1960
  - Erler Film company founded.
  - Ekonomist magazine founded.
- 1961
  - March: Hürriyet Daily News founded.
  - Yenibosna S.K. founded.
- 1962
  - E.C.A. Elginkan Anadolu Lisesi founded.
  - Telsiz ve Radyo Amatörleri Cemiyeti founded.
- 1963 – Gaziosmanpaşaspor founded.
- 1964
  - Askam (trucks) company founded.
  - Harbiye Muhsin Ertuğrul Stage opens.
- 1965
  - Population: 2,293,823 (districts of Adalar, Bakırköy, Beşiktaş, Beykoz, Beyoğlu, Çatalca, Eyüp, Fatih, Gaziosmanpaşa, Kadıköy, Kartal, Sarıyer, Silivri, Şile, Şişli, Üsküdar, Yalova, and Zeytinburnu).
  - Yapı Merkezi company founded.
- 1966 – İdealtepe railway station opened.
- 1967
  - 15 June: Confederation of Progressive Trade Unions of Turkey holds first meeting.
  - Kaynarca railway station opened.
  - Moğollar established.
- 1968
  - Yedikule Anadolu Lisesi founded.
  - Küçükköyspor founded.
- 1969
  - 17 January: Vehbi Koç Foundation established.
  - 16 February: Bloody Sunday (1969).
  - 12 April: Atatürk Cultural Center dedicated.
  - Efes Beverage Group established.
- 1970
  - Eyüboğlu High School founded.
  - 22 April: Türkiye newspaper begins publishing.
- 1971
  - 2 November: Beyoğlu station re-opened after reconstruction.
  - Turkish Industry and Business Association established.
  - Turkish Society for Electron Microscopy established.
- 1972 – Desa company established.
- 1973
  - 12 January: Millî Gazete begins publishing.
  - 19 April: Dostluk S.K. founded.
  - Bosphorus Bridge built.
  - Ömerli Dam built.
  - 50th Anniversary of the Republic Sculptures erected.
  - Istanbul International Music Festival begins.
  - Istanbul Foundation for Culture and Arts established.
- 1974
  - 10 September: Haliç Bridge opened.
  - Derimod company founded.
- 1975
  - 30 January: Turkish Airlines Flight 345 crash.
  - Çukurova (construction firm) established.
  - Istanbul Technical University Turkish Music State Conservatory founded.
- 1976
  - Muhammad Maarifi Mosque built.
  - Çamlıca TRT Television Tower built.
  - Polin Waterparks company founded.
- 1977
  - 1 May: Taksim Square massacre.
- 1978 – December: Kadınca women's magazine begins publishing.
- 1979 – Istanbul Marathon begins.
- 1980
  - 14 October: Sadberk Hanım Museum opened.
  - Cengiz Holding established.
  - Bogazici University Sports Fest founded.
- 1981
  - 2 March: Dünya founded.
  - Koçbank founded.
  - Can Yayınları publishing company founded.
  - Metris Prison established.
- 1982
  - 19 February: Güneş founded.
  - International Istanbul Film Festival begins.
  - Istanbul Book Fair inaugurated.
  - Atatürk High School of Science, Istanbul established.
  - World Trade Center Istanbul established.
  - Timas Publishing Group established.
  - İletişim Yayınları publishing company established.
  - Kaynak Yayınları publishing company established.
  - Malta Kiosk restored and re-opened.
  - Ezginin Günlüğü band formed.
- 1983
  - ITU Mustafa Inan Library opened.
  - Enka SK founded.
  - İstanbul Güngörenspor founded.
- 1984
  - March: Hotel Yeşil Ev established.
  - March 23: Municipality of Greater Istanbul established.
  - Population: 2,951,000 (estimate).
- 1986 – 6 September: Neve Shalom Synagogue massacre. Gunmen kill 22 Jews in an attack orchestrated by Palestinian militant Abu Nidal.
- 1987
  - The districts of Büyükçekmece, Kağıthane, Küçükçekmece, Pendik and Ümraniye are created.
  - 1 October: Galleria Ataköy opened.
- 1988
  - 9 May: TGC Press Media Museum established.
  - 3 July: Fatih Sultan Mehmet Bridge built.
  - Koç School opened.
- 1989
  - 3 September: Istanbul Metro begins operating.
  - Kadıköy Haldun Taner Stage in use.
- 1990
  - İstanbul Başakşehir F.K. established.
  - The district of Bayrampaşa is created.
- 1991 – Swissôtel The Bosphorus opened.
- 1992
  - 1 March: Neve Shalom Synagogue bomb attack. No casualties or damage.
  - The districts of Avcılar, Bağcılar, Bahçelievler, Güngören, Maltepe, Sultanbeyli, and Tuzla are created.
  - 13 June: T1 (Istanbul Tram) line opened.
  - Istanbul Hezarfen Airfield opened.
- 1993
  - Sabancı Center built.
  - International Defence Industry Fair established.
  - Akbank Sanat opened.
  - Koç University opened.
  - 6–7 May: 2nd ECO Summit held.
  - 18 December: Akmerkez opened.
  - The district of Esenler is created.
- 1994
  - 31 October: Istanbul Bilgi University established.
  - December: Galata Bridge rebuilt.
  - Esenler Coach Terminal built.
  - Recep Tayyip Erdoğan becomes mayor of greater Istanbul.
  - Population: 7,615,500 in city (approximate estimate).
- 1995
  - 12–15 March: Gazi Quarter riots.
  - The district of Yalova is separated from Istanbul Province and Yalova Province is created.
- 1996
  - United Nations Conference on Human Settlements held.
  - Üsküdar Belediyespor founded.
- 1998 – Ahmet Cömert Sport Hall built.
- 1999
  - 13–14 March: 1999 Istanbul bombings.
  - 26 July – 1 August: 1999 European Aquatics Championships held.
  - The 7.6 M_{w} İzmit earthquake shakes northwestern Turkey with a maximum Mercalli intensity of IX (Violent), leaving 17,118–17,127 dead and 43,953–50,000 injured in the region.
  - Changa (restaurant) established.

== 21st century ==
- 2000
  - Population: 10,018,735.
  - Tekstilkent Plaza built.
  - 6 May: Istanbul Postal Museum established.
  - 26 August: Isbank Tower 1 built.
  - 16 September: M2 (Istanbul Metro) opened.
- 2001
  - Istanbul Sabiha Gökçen International Airport opened.
  - 21 September: Tepe Nautilus mall opened.
- 2002
  - Tekfen Tower built.
  - Endem TV Tower built.
  - Sakıp Sabancı Museum opened.
- 2003
  - Istanbul Pride begins.
  - 2 May: Miniatürk opened.
  - November: 2003 Istanbul bombings.
  - Miniatürk park opens.
- 2004
  - City boundaries become coterminous with those of Istanbul Province.
  - Kadir Topbaş becomes mayor of Greater Istanbul.
  - March 9, 2004 attack on Istanbul restaurant.
  - 12 and 15 May: Eurovision Song Contest 2004 held.
  - 28–29 June: City hosts 2004 Istanbul summit.
  - 11 December: İstanbul Modern museum of art opened.
- 2005 – April: Sabancı Performing Arts Center opens in Tuzla.
- 2006 – 6 June: Kanyon Shopping Mall opened.
- 2007
  - 19 January: Assassination of Hrant Dink.
  - 29 April: Republic Protest.
  - 12 September: T4 (Istanbul Tram) opened.
  - Şişli Plaza built.
  - Süreyya Opera House in Kadıköy.
- 2008
  - The districts of Arnavutköy, Ataşehir, Başakşehir, Beylikdüzü, Çekmeköy, Esenyurt, Sancaktepe, and Sultangazi are created. The district Eminönü is abolished and merged into Fatih.
  - 1 February: Istanbul fireworks explosion in Davutpaşa.
  - 9 July: 2008 United States consulate in Istanbul attack.
  - 21 July: 70 Million Steps Against Coups.
  - 27 July: 2008 Istanbul bombings.
  - Labour strike in Tuzla.
- 2009
  - 7 May: Şakirin Mosque opened.
  - 17 October: Istanbul Congress Center opened
  - City districts increased from 32 to 39.
  - Istanbul Congress Center built.
  - Depo art space founded.
- 2010
  - 14 January: Harbiye Muhsin Ertuğrul Stage rebuilt.
  - 28 August – 12 September: 2010 FIBA World Championship held.
  - 31 October: 2010 Istanbul bombing.
  - Baklahorani (carnival) revived.
- 2011
  - 4 March: Istanbul Sapphire opened.
  - 18 March: Istanbul Shopping Fest inaugurated.
  - July: Istanbul Justice Palace built.
  - 6 October: Ora Arena opened.
- 2012
  - 26 February 2012 Istanbul rally to commemorate the Khojaly massacre held.
  - 17 August: M4 (Istanbul Metro) line opened.
  - Sancaklar Mosque built.
  - MEF University opened.
  - Forensic Science Institute of Turkey opened.
  - Museum of Innocence opens.
  - Population: 13,854,740.
- 2013
  - 28 May: Gezi Park protests begin in Taksim Square.
  - 14 June: M3 (Istanbul Metro) line opened.
  - 10 October: Zorlu Center opened.
  - 29 October:
    - Marmaray Tunnel phase of the Marmaray project opened for public use.
    - Ayrılık Çeşmesi railway station opened.
- 2014
  - 15 February: Golden Horn Metro Bridge opened.
  - 1 September: Raffles Istanbul hotel opened.
  - 29 November: Pope Francis visit to meet with Patriarch Bartholomew I and Muslim leaders.
  - Sancaklar Mosque built in Büyükçekmece.
  - Istanbul Half Marathon established.
- 2015
  - 6 January: 2015 Istanbul suicide bombing.
  - 17 March: 2015 SAHA Istanbul, Defence, Aviation and Space Clustering Association established.
  - 19 April: M6 (Istanbul Metro) line opened.
  - 26 May: Mehmet Çakır Cultural and Sports Center opened.
  - 1 December: 2015 Istanbul metro bombing.
  - 23 December: 2015 Sabiha Gökçen Airport bombing.
- 2016
  - 12 January: January 2016 Istanbul bombing.
  - 19 March: March 2016 Istanbul bombing.
  - 11 April: Vodafone Park opened.
  - 7 June: June 2016 Istanbul bombing.
  - 28 June: Istanbul Atatürk Airport attack.
  - 15–16 July: 2016 Turkish coup d'état attempt.
  - 20 August: Beykoz University established.
  - 23 August: Özgürlükçü Demokrasi launched.
  - 26 August: Yavuz Sultan Selim Bridge opened.
  - 6 October: October 2016 Istanbul bombing.
  - 10 December: December 2016 Istanbul bombings.
  - 22 December: Eurasia Tunnel opened.
- 2017
  - 1 January: 2017 Istanbul nightclub shooting.
  - 9 July: 2017 March for Justice.
  - 29 October: F3 (Istanbul Metro) line opened.
  - 15 December: M5 (Istanbul Metro) line opened.
  - Population: 15,029,231 (estimate, urban agglomeration).
- 2018
  - Saha Expo first held.
  - 20–23 September: Teknofest Istanbul held.
  - 29 October: Istanbul Airport opened.
  - Prince MBS of Saudi Arabia sends a group of government agents to murder prominent critic, Jamal Khashoggi. His death is just a few days before his sixtieth birthday.
- 2019
  - Opposition candidate Ekrem Imamoglu won the repeat race for Istanbul's mayor.
  - 6 April: Atatürk Airport ceased all commercial passenger operations.
- 2022
  - 13 November: an explosion on İstiklal Avenue in the Beyoğlu district left at least six people dead and 81 injured.
- 2024
  - 2024 Istanbul Palace of Justice attack: an armed attack on a police station took place near the Istanbul Justice Palace.
  - Ekrem İmamoğlu was reelected as Istanbul Mayor for a second term in 2024.
- 2025
  - 2025 Turkish protests: hundreds of thousands of pro-democracy demonstrators gathered in the streets of Istanbul.

== See also ==
- History of Istanbul
- List of mayors of Istanbul
- List of sultans of the Ottoman Empire, 1450s–1920s
- Timelines of other cities in Turkey: Ankara, Bursa, İzmir

== Bibliography ==
=== Published in 18th–19th centuries ===
- Petrus Gyllius; John Ball (1729). Antiquities of Constantinople. London.
- William Hunter (1803), "(Constantinople)", Travels through France, Turkey, and Hungary, to Vienna, in 1792 (3rd ed.), London: J. White, OCLC 10321359
- H.A.S. Dearborn (1819), "Constantinople", A Memoir on the Commerce and Navigation of the Black Sea, Boston: Wells & Lilly
- Jedidiah Morse; Richard C. Morse (1823), "Constantinople", A New Universal Gazetteer (4th ed.), New Haven: S. Converse
- Josiah Conder (1830), "Constantinople", Turkey, The Modern Traveller, vol. 14, London: J.Duncan
- John Fuller (1830), "Constantinople", Narrative of a Tour Through Some Parts of the Turkish Empire, John Murray, OCLC 15470157
- David Brewster, ed. (1832). "Constantinople". Edinburgh Encyclopædia. Vol. 7. Philadelphia: Joseph and Edward Parker. hdl:2027/mdp.39015068302770.
- Evliya Çelebi (1834). "(Constantinople)". Narrative of Travels in Europe, Asia, and Africa, in the Seventeenth Century. Vol. 1. Translated by Joseph von Hammer-Purgstall. London: Oriental Translation Fund.
- Thomas Bartlett (1841). "Constantinople". New Tablet of Memory; or, Chronicle of Remarkable Events. London: Thomas Kelly.
- John Macgregor (1844). "Trade of Constantinople". Commercial Statistics. London: C. Knight and Co.
- "Constantinople", Hand-book for Travellers in the Ionian Islands, Greece, Turkey, Asia Minor, and Constantinople, London: J. Murray, 1845, hdl:2027/mdp.39015063903770, OCLC 397597
- Mrs. Edmund Hornby (1858), In and Around Stamboul, Philadelphia: J. Challen & Son, OL 7196461M
- Charles Knight, ed. (1866). "Constantinople". Geography. English Cyclopaedia. Vol. 2. London: Bradbury, Evans, & Co. hdl:2027/nyp.33433000064794.
- "Constantinople", Appleton's European Guide Book, New York: D. Appleton & Co., 1888
- William Holden Hutton (1900), Constantinople, Mediaeval Towns, London: J. M. Dent, OCLC 150311124

=== Published in 20th century ===
- "Constantinople", Chambers's Encyclopaedia, London: W. & R. Chambers, 1901
- Handbook for Travellers in Constantinople, Brûsa, and the Troad, London: J. Murray, 1907
- Guide to Greece, the Archipelago, Constantinople, the Coasts of Asia Minor. London: Macmillan and Co. 1907.
- Demetrius Coufopoulos (1910), Guide to Constantinople (4th ed.), London: Adam and Charles Black, OL 7046206M
- Benjamin Vincent (1910), "Constantinople", Haydn's Dictionary of Dates (25th ed.), London: Ward, Lock & Co.
- van Millingen, Alexander (1911). "Constantinople" . Encyclopædia Britannica. Vol. 7 (11th ed.). pp. 3–9.
- Robert Hichens (1913), The Near East: Dalmatia, Greece and Constantinople, New York: Century Co., OCLC 1293222, OL 6561851M
- Francis Whiting Halsey, ed. (1914). "Constantinople". Russia, Scandinavia, and the Southeast. Seeing Europe with Famous Authors. Vol. 10. Funk & Wagnalls Company – via HathiTrust.
- William Harman Black (1920). "Turkey: Constantinople". The Real Europe Pocket Guide-Book. Black's Blue Books. New York: Brentano's.
- Alt-Konstantinopel [Old Constantinople: 110 photographs of the city] (in German), München: Roland-Verlag, 1920, OL 25508865M
- Glanville Downey (1960), Constantinople in the Age of Justinian, Centers of Civilization Series, USA: University of Oklahoma Press, OL 5800255M
- Bernard Lewis (1963), Istanbul and the Civilization of the Ottoman Empire, USA: University of Oklahoma Press, OCLC 479098
- "Istanbul, the City That Links Europe and Asia", National Geographic, vol. 144, Washington DC, 1973
- J. H. G. Lebon (1970). "Islamic City in the Near East: A Comparative Study of Cairo, Alexandria and Istanbul". Town Planning Review. 41 (2): 179–194. doi:10.3828/tpr.41.2.4k8270pq400mu05p. JSTOR 40102697.
- Colin Thubron (1978), Istanbul, Great Cities, Time-Life Books, OL 4178939M
- Philip Mansel (1995), Constantinople: City of the World's Desire, 1453–1924, John Murray, ISBN 978-0-7195-5076-8
- Trudy Ring, ed. (1996). "Istanbul". Southern Europe. International Dictionary of Historic Places. Vol. 3. Fitzroy Dearborn. OCLC 31045650.
- Edhem Eldem; et al. (1999), The Ottoman City between East and West: Aleppo, Izmir, and Istanbul, New York: Cambridge University Press, ISBN 052164304X

=== Published in 21st century ===
- Arzu Öztürkmen (2002). "From Constantinople to Istanbul: Two Sources on the Historical Folklore of a City". Asian Folklore Studies. 61 (2): 271–294. doi:10.2307/1178974. JSTOR 1178974.
- Europe's Muslim Capital by Philip Mansel in the June 2003 issue of History Today
- Amy Mills (2005). "Narratives in City Landscapes: Cultural Identity in Istanbul". Geographical Review. 95 (3): 441–462. Bibcode:2005GeoRv..95..441M. doi:10.1111/j.1931-0846.2005.tb00375.x. JSTOR 30034247. S2CID 161748663.
- Josef W. Meri, ed. (2006). "Istanbul". Medieval Islamic Civilization. Routledge. ISBN 978-0-415-96691-7.
- C. Edmund Bosworth, ed. (2007). "Istanbul". Historic Cities of the Islamic World. Leiden: Koninklijke Brill. pp. 180–218. ISBN 978-9004153882.
- Bruce Stanley (2008), "Istanbul", in Michael R.T. Dumper; Bruce E. Stanley (eds.), Cities of the Middle East and North Africa, Santa Barbara, USA: ABC-CLIO, pp. 180–187, ISBN 978-1-57607-919-5
- Nebahat Avcioğlu (2008). "Istanbul: The Palimpsest City in Search of Its Architext". RES: Anthropology and Aesthetics (53/54): 190–210. JSTOR 25608817.
- Gabor Agoston; Bruce Alan Masters, eds. (2009). "Istanbul". Encyclopedia of the Ottoman Empire. Facts on File. p. 286. ISBN 978-1-4381-1025-7.
- "Istanbul". Grove Encyclopedia of Islamic Art & Architecture. Oxford University Press. 2009. pp. 315–330. ISBN 978-0-19-530991-1.
- Ebru Boyar (2010), Social history of Ottoman Istanbul, Cambridge: Cambridge University Press, ISBN 9780521199551
- Birge Yildirim (2012), Transformation Of Public Squares Of Istanbul Between 1938—1949 – via International Planning History Society
- Gerhard Böwering, ed. (2013). "Istanbul". Princeton Encyclopedia of Islamic Political Thought. Princeton University Press. ISBN 978-0-691-13484-0.
