= Beer in Turkey =

Beer in Turkey existed since its first introduction in West Asia thousands of years ago and is a popular alcoholic beverage, mostly lager type beers.

== History ==
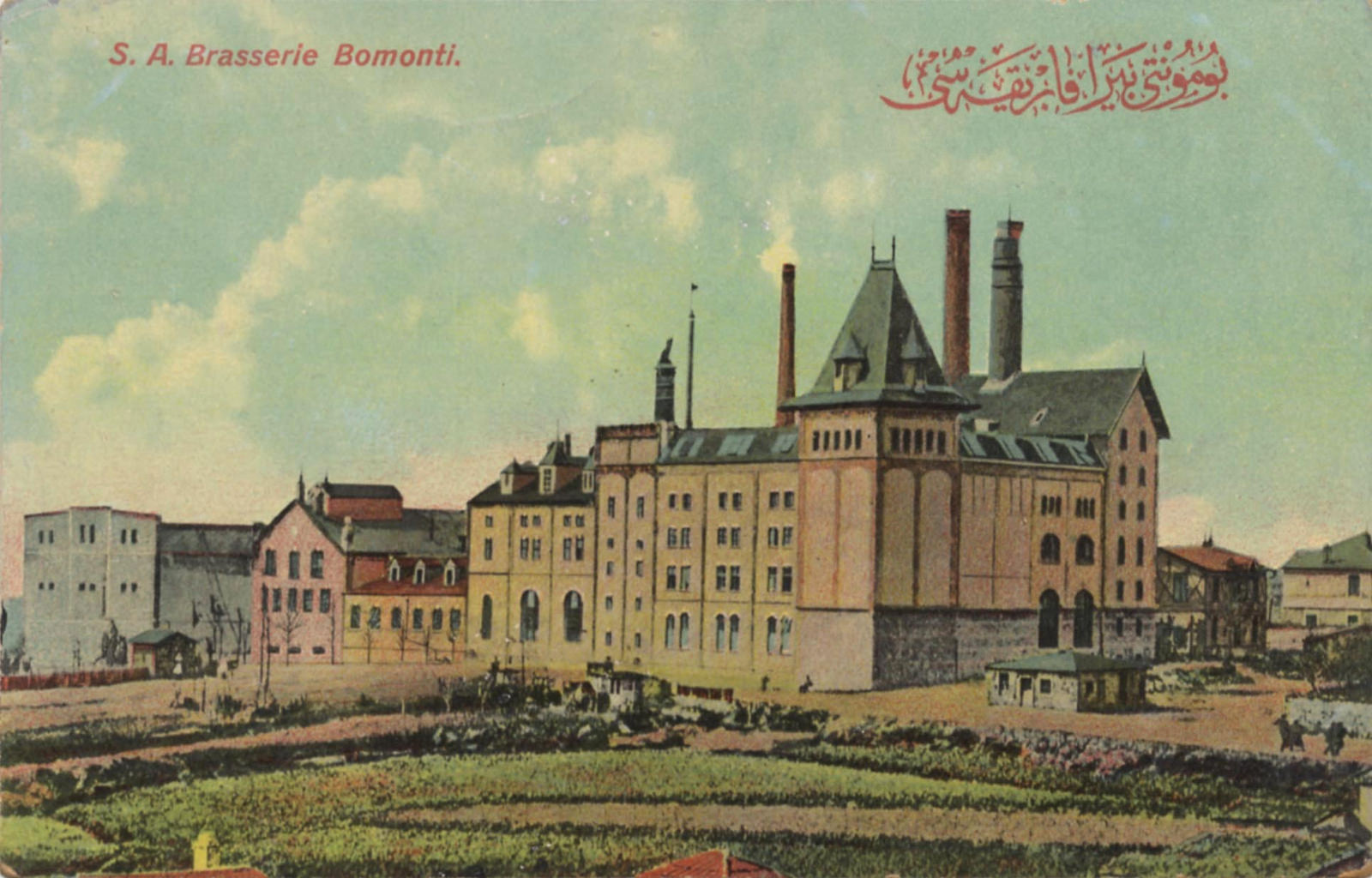
Bomonti Beer Factory on a postcard during the Ottoman period

Beer has existed as a beverage in Anatolia since the Sumerian civilization. Archaeological findings have shown that Sumer people knew how to ferment beer. Early Turks in Anatolia fermented boza, which was much like kvass.

The modern history of beer in Turkey started with the Ottoman Empire. During certain periods of the Ottoman Empire, drinking alcoholic beverages was forbidden in some cities, but many small producers in Istanbul made boza with a high alcohol level, like beer. Beer was first produced and served at Erzurum by some small Armenian producers in "beer gardens" (Turkish: bira bahçeleri). The first modern production of beer in Turkey started with the Bomonti beer factory in Istanbul in 1894 by the Swiss Bomonti brothers.

There were many pubs and bars in Istanbul, Izmir, and Thessaloniki. Production of beer in the Ottoman Empire was 1.2 billion liters in 1894. This increased to 9.9 billion liters in 1913–1914.

Atatürk, the first president of the Turkish Republic, founded an ale factory in Ankara. İsmet İnönü, the first prime minister of Turkey, worked to improve the old Bomonti Beer Company. This created the first beer competition in Turkey.

== Industry ==
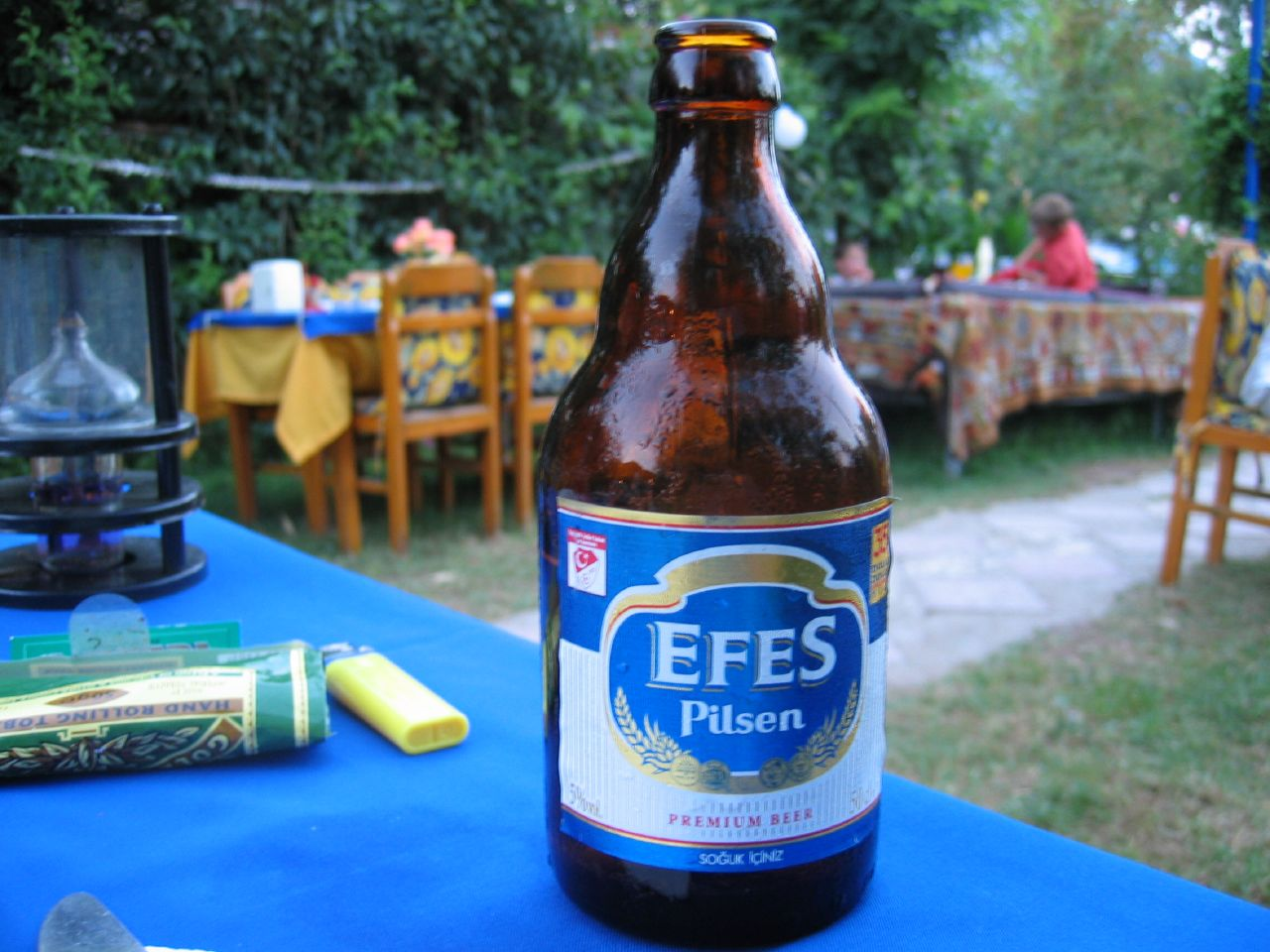
Efes Pilsen in its classical tombul ('fat') bottle.

The Turkish beer market experienced 20% growth from 2001 to 2005, with many international brands gaining popularity.

Efes Beverage Group, a subsidiary of Anadolu Group, is the largest producer of beer in Turkey, with approximately 80% of the market. Their main product line is called Efes Pilsen (5.0% ABV), after the Turkish name for the ancient city of Ephesus near the İzmir brewery. Efes also produces Efes Dark, Efes Light, Efes Extra, Bomonti and Marmara. Also, as of March 2005, Foster's Lager has been brewed, marketed and distributed in Turkey through Efes Beverage Group. Efes exports to markets in Europe, the United States Russia, the Caucasus region, the Middle East, Africa, and South-east Asia.

Efes also produce a Hefe Weiss and a Hefe Weiss Dunkel under the Gusta label. A further addition is the Efes Dark Brown, which is flavored with coffee.

Türk Tuborg, a former subsidiary of the Danish Carlsberg/Tuborg group, also brews beer in Turkey under the Tuborg name, but is now owned by the Israeli Central Bottling Company (CBC). Danish Carlsberg is also popular in Turkey, among other brands found internationally.

Another major brand, Tekel Birası, is known as the oldest producer of beer in Turkey (founded in 1890). It was a state monopoly brand until 2004. There is also Perge Pilsner managed by the Sural Group.

== Independent Craft Breweries ==
There is an emerging craft beer market in Turkey for the last 10 years. The brands are listed in alphabetic order below.

- Asante Brewery, Adana
- Khoffner Brewery, Antalya
- 3 Kafadar, Istanbul.
- Anthiocs, Hatay.
- Cunda Bira, Ayvalık.
- Dasbira Brewing Co., Kırklareli.
- Feliz Kulpa, İzmir.
- Gara Guzu Brewery, Muğla.
- Knidos Brewery, Istanbul.
- Pablo Brewery, Bodrum.
- Red Tower Brewery, Alanya.
- Torch Brewery, Istanbul.
- Trokya, Edirne.

== Brands ==
- Atatürk's Forest Farm Ale (inactive)
- Becks, by Efes
- Bremen 1827, by Efes
- Bomonti (first beer company in Turkey; nationalized by TEKEL, it was rebranded as Tekel Birası; now produced by Efes Pilsener with the original recipe)
- Carlsberg, by Turk-Tuborg (Carlsberg Group)
- Efes Pilsener
- Gara Guzu
- Löwenbrau (once)
- Tuborg (Carlsberg Group)
- Marmara Kırmızı (Red) (high ABV)
- Miller, by Efes Pilsener
- Pera
- Perge Pilsner, by Sural Group
- Vole (once)

== See also ==
- Beer and breweries by region
