= Çukurova (disambiguation) =

Çukurova is a large fertile plain in the Cilicia region of southern Turkey.

Çukurova may also refer to

- Çukurova, Adana, a municipality in Greater Adana, Turkey
- Çukurova (construction firm), based in Istanbul, Turkey
