= History of Istanbul =

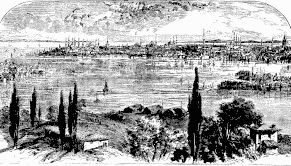
Depiction of Istanbul, then known in English as Constantinople, from Young Folks' History of Rome by Charlotte Mary Yonge

Neolithic artifacts, uncovered by archeologists at the beginning of the 21st century, indicate that Istanbul's historic peninsula was settled as far back as the 6th millennium BCE. That early settlement, important in the spread of the Neolithic Revolution from the Near East to Europe, lasted for almost a millennium before being inundated by rising water levels. The first human settlement on the Asian side, the Fikirtepe mound, is from the Copper Age period, with artifacts dating from 5500 to 3500 BCE. On the European side, near the point of the peninsula (Sarayburnu), there was a settlement during the early 1st millennium BCE. Modern authors have linked it to the possible Thracian toponym Lygos, mentioned by Pliny the Elder as an earlier name for the site of Byzantium.

There is evidence suggesting there were settlements around the region dating as far back as 6700 BC, and it is hard to define if there was any settlement on exact spot at city proper established, but earliest records about the city proper begin around 660 BC (Note: The foundation of Byzantion (Byzantium) is sometimes, especially in encyclopedic or other tertiary sources, placed firmly in 667 BCE. Historians have disputed the precise year the city was founded. Commonly cited is the work of 5th-century-BCE historian Herodotus, which says the city was founded seventeen years after Chalcedon, which came into existence around 685 BCE. Eusebius concurs with 685 BCE as the year Chalcedon was founded, but places Byzantion's establishment in 659 BCE. Among more modern historians, Carl Roebuck proposed the 640s BCE and others have suggested even later. The foundation date of Chalcedon is itself subject to some debate; while many sources place it in 685 BC, others put it in 675 BCE or even 639 BCE (with Byzantion's establishment placed in 619 BCE). Some sources refer to Byzantium's foundation as the 7th century BCE.) when Greek settlers from the Attic town of Megara colonized the area and established Byzantium on the European side of the Bosphorus. It fell to the Roman Republic in 196 BC, and was known as Byzantium in Latin until 330, when the city, soon renamed as Constantinople, became the new capital of the Roman Empire. During the reign of Justinian I, the city rose to be the largest in the western world, with a population peaking at close to half a million people. Constantinople functioned as the capital of the Byzantine Empire, which effectively ended with the fall of Constantinople in 1453. Constantinople then became the capital of the Ottoman Turks.

The population had declined during the medieval period, but as the Ottoman Empire approached its historical peak, the city grew to a population of close to 700,000 in the 16th century, once again ranking among the world's most populous cities. With the founding of the Republic of Turkey in 1923, that country's capital moved from Constantinople to Ankara (previously Angora).

== Prehistory ==
Humans have lived in the area now known as Istanbul since at least the Neolithic period. The earliest known settlement dates from 6700 BC, discovered in 2008, during the construction works of the Yenikapı subway station and the Marmaray tunnel at the historic peninsula on the European side. On the Anatolian side, the earliest known settlement is the Fikirtepe mound from the Copper Age period, with artifacts dating from 5500 to 3500 BC. In nearby Kadıköy (Chalcedon) a port settlement dating back to the Phoenicians has been discovered.

== Lygos ==
The first name of the city was Lygos according to Pliny the Elder in his historical accounts and it was possibly founded by Thracian tribes. Only a few walls and substructures belonging to Lygos have survived to date, near the Seraglio Point, where the Topkapı Palace now stands. On the Asian side there was a Phoenician colony.

== Byzantium ==
Byzantion (Βυζάντιον), Latinized as Byzantium, was the next name of the city. The name is believed to be of Thracian origin from the word būzas (“he-goat”). Specifically, it may be derived from the Thracian personal name Byzas. Ancient Greek legend refers to a legendary king Byzas as the leader of the Megarian colonists and eponymous founder of the city. Cape Moda in Chalcedon was the first location which the Greek settlers from Megara chose to colonize in 685 BC, before colonizing Byzantion on the European side of the Bosphorus under the command of King Byzas in 667 BC. Byzantion was established on the site of an ancient port settlement named Lygos During the period of Byzantion, the Acropolis used to stand where the Topkapı Palace stands today.

After siding with Pescennius Niger against the victorious Septimius Severus the city was besieged by Rome and suffered extensive damage in AD 196. Byzantium was rebuilt by the Roman Emperor Septimius Severus and quickly regained its previous prosperity, being temporarily renamed as Augusta Antonina by the emperor, in honor of his son.

== Late Roman period and the Eastern Roman (Byzantine) Empire ==
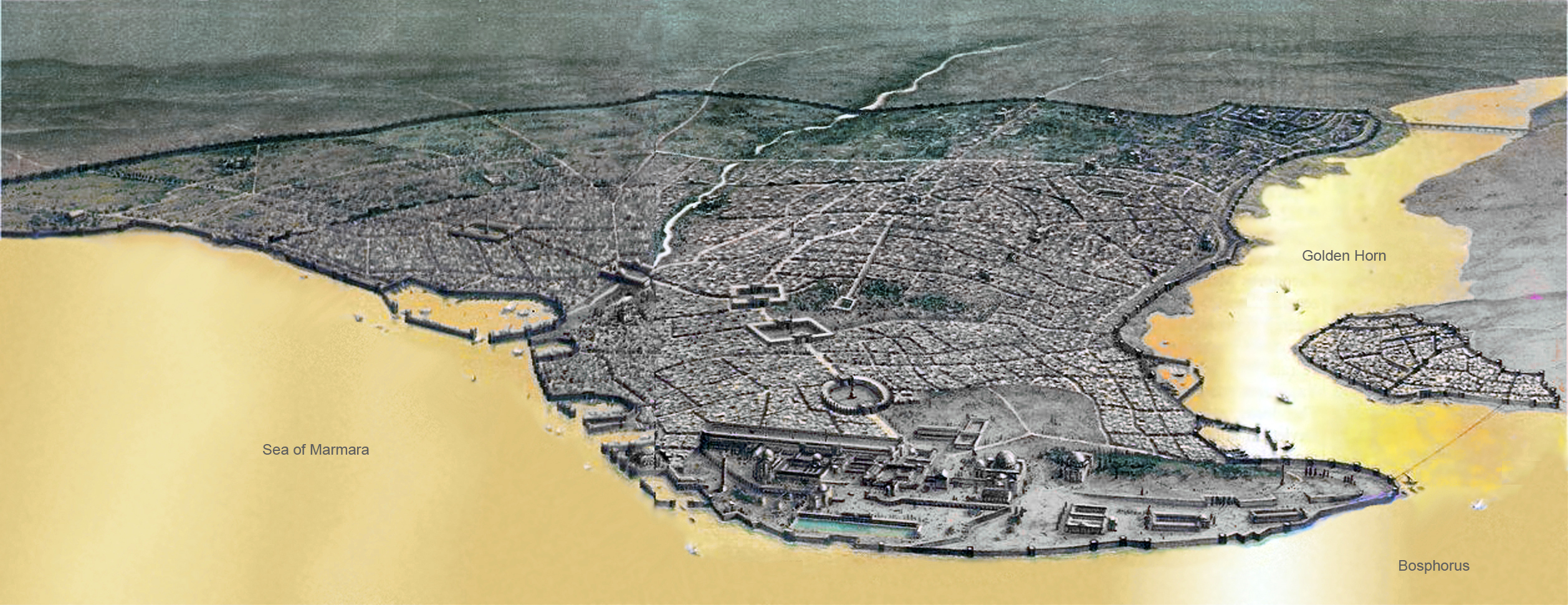
An artist's impression of Constantinople

The location of Byzantium attracted Constantine the Great in 324 after a prophetic dream was said to have identified the location of the city; this prophecy was probably due to Constantine's final victory over Licinius at the Battle of Chrysopolis (Üsküdar) on the Bosphorus, on 18 September 324, which ended the civil war between the Roman Co-Emperors, and brought an end to the final vestiges of the Tetrarchy system, during which Nicomedia (present-day İzmit, 100 km east of Istanbul) was the most senior capital city of the Roman Empire. Byzantium (now renamed as Nova Roma which eventually became Constantinopolis, i.e. The City of Constantine) was officially proclaimed the new capital of the Roman Empire in 330. At the end of his reign in 337, Constantine declared his three sons as joint heirs of the Roman Empire in a system of co-emperorship. However, the sons could not govern together peacefully and their military rivalry split the empire on the north–south line along the Balkan Peninsula. The territory was officially split in 395 when Theodosius I (ruled, 379–395) died, leaving his son Honorius emperor of the Western Roman Empire, and his other son Arcadius emperor of the Eastern Roman (Byzantine) Empire.

Constantinople became the capital of the Byzantine Empire. The combination of imperial power and a key location at the crossing point between the continents of Europe and Asia, and later Africa and other regions, played an important role in terms of commerce, culture, diplomacy, and strategy. It was the center of the Greek world and, for most of the Byzantine period, the largest city in Europe. Constantine's conversion to Christianity, in 312, had set the Roman Empire towards Christianization, and in 381, during the reign of Theodosius I, the official state religion of the Roman Empire became Nicene Christianity, turning Constantinople into a thriving religious center.

Throughout the fifth century, the Western Roman Empire lost most of its power through a decline in political, economic, and social situations, the last western emperor being deposed by Germanic mercenaries in AD 476; the eastern half, however, was flourishing. According to historians this flourishing Eastern Roman Empire was then classified as the Byzantine Empire to distinguish it from the Roman Empire. This empire was distinctly Greek in culture, and became the centre of Greek Orthodox Christianity after an earlier split with Rome, and was adorned with many magnificent churches, including Hagia Sophia, once the world's largest cathedral. The seat of the Patriarch of Constantinople, spiritual leader of the Eastern Orthodox Church, remains.

The most famous Byzantine emperor was Justinian (527-565). During his reign, he extended the Byzantine Empire to its largest boundaries spreading from Palestine to the tip of Spain. His other achievements include the famous Hagia Sophia church and the organized law system called the Codex which was completed in 534. Justinian's reign is considered the greatest influence of the Byzantine Empire.

Starting in the 600s, warfare kept Constantinople's power flip-flopping between decline and progression. Alliance with Europe slowly began to break away from the Byzantine Empire between the seventh-eighth centuries, when the Byzantine and Roman churches disagreed on various subjects. However, the distinguishing gap placed between the two churches involved the use of icons in the church. Icons, being images of Christian holy people such as Jesus Christ, the Virgin Mary, and the saints, to Byzantine Christians were more than representations; they were believed to possess holy power that affected people's daily lives. While many Byzantines worshiped icons, many opposed the icons, because they tested the authorities of the emperor. Finally, in 726 Emperor Leo III the Isaurian (ruled, 717-741) ordered all icons to be destroyed. The destruction of icons reorganized and reoriented the Byzantine rulers in imperial power. The fierce opposition to icons clashed with the Pope's tolerance of images. The papacy was unwilling to permit sacred images and icons to be destroyed and this caused an eventual separation. Their separation caused hatred between the two churches and cooperation between the two was a struggle.

From around the 9th to 13th centuries, Constantinople developed complex relationships with an emerging and later the largest and most advanced state of that time in Europe – Kiev Rus. Constantinople played a significant role in the Kiev Rus development, culture, and politics. Many of the Kiev Princes were married to daughters of the Byzantine Emperors, and because of this connection, Eastern Europe became Eastern Orthodox after the Christianization of Kievan Rus' by Vladimir the Great of Kiev. However, these relationships were not always friendly – Constantinople was sacked several times over those 400 years by Kiev Princes, forcing Constantinople to sign increasingly favorable treaties for Kiev, the texts of which were preserved in the Primary Chronicle and other historical documents (see Rus'-Byzantine Wars). Byzantine constantly played Kiev, Poland, Bulgaria, and other European Nations of that time, against each other.

Near 1204, Constantinople began to decline in power. Because of the failure of the Third Crusade, self-confident Latin Christians decided to again try to capture the Holy City of Jerusalem in the Fourth Crusade; but this time their plan was to capture the Byzantine Empire as well. In 1204, western armies captured Constantinople and ransacked the city for treasures. The pope decried the sacking of Constantinople but ordered the crusaders to consolidate their gains in the city for a year. The crusaders chose Baldwin of Flanders to be the new Latin Emperor of Constantinople; he along with other princes and the Republic of Venice divided the Empire amongst themselves; they never made it to Jerusalem. This new Latin Empire at Constantinople lasted until 1261 when the Byzantines under the command of Michael VIII Palaeologus recaptured the city and some outlying territory. After this, Constantinople never regained its former glory. Rather than a thriving metropolis, Constantinople transformed into a collection of villages, and became a semi-ghost town with, as Ibn Battuta noted, sown fields within the city walls. The city by 1453 held less than a tenth of its former population.

== Ottoman Empire ==
The city, officially known in Ottoman Turkish as Kostantiniye (قسطنطینیه, after the Arabic form al-Qusṭanṭīniyyah القسطنطينية "[city] of Constantine") while its Christian minorities continued to call it Kōnstantinoupolis (Κωνσταντινούπολις) as in the original Greek and people writing in French, English and other European languages used its Latinized variants, was the capital of the Ottoman Empire from its conquest in 1453 until the empire's collapse in 1922.

=== Conquest ===
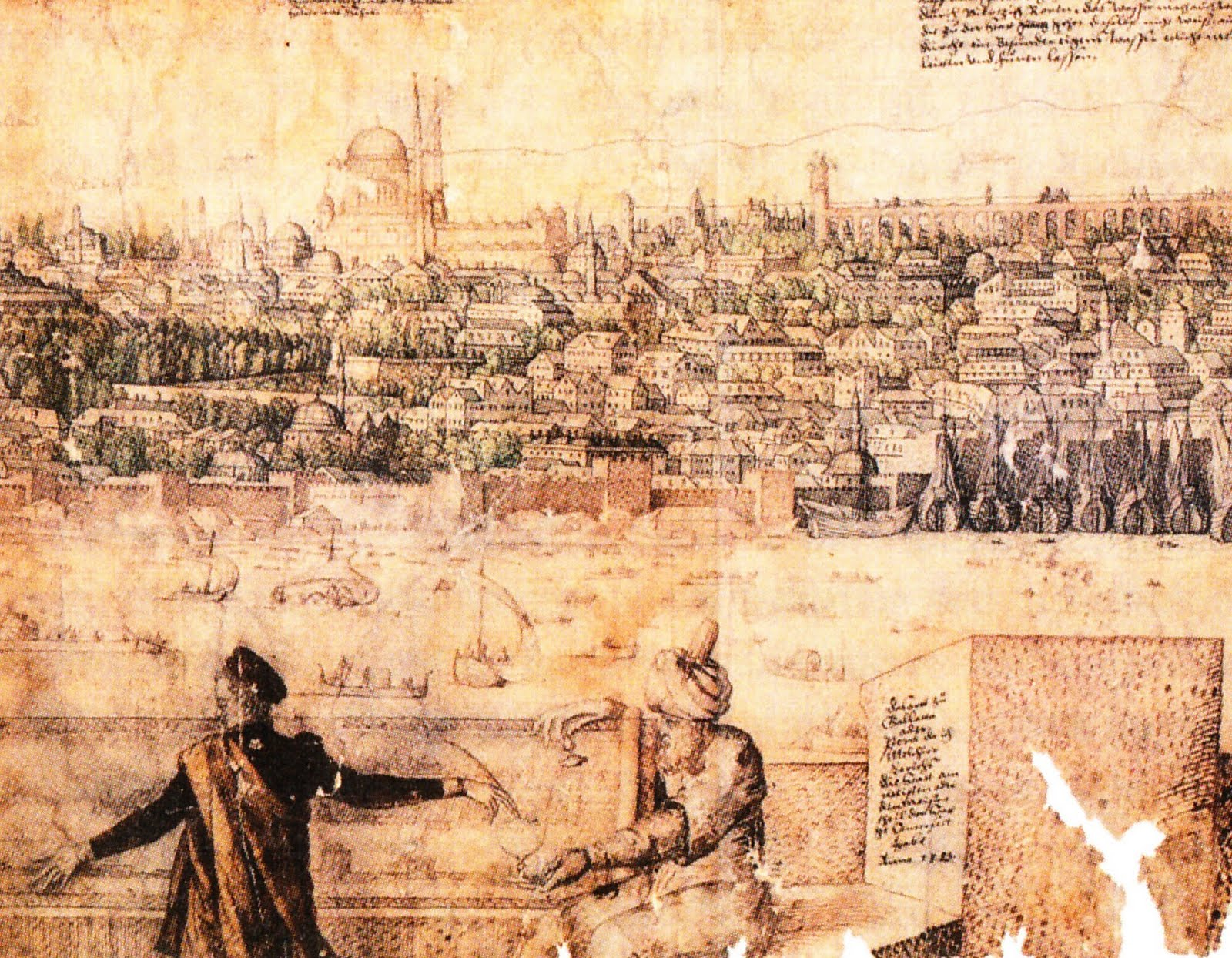
Melchior Lorck – The Prospect of Constantinople (16th century)

On 29 May 1453, Sultan Mehmed II "the Conqueror" entered Constantinople after a 53–day siege during which his cannon had torn a huge hole in the Walls of Theodosius II. The city became the fourth and final capital of the Ottoman Empire.

Mehmed had begun the siege on 6 April 1453. He had hired engineers to build cannons and bombs for the occasion. He also acquired scholars and imams to encourage the soldiers. In accordance with Shariah (Muslim Holy Law), Mehmed gave the Byzantine emperor Constantine XI Palaiologos (1449–1453) three chances to surrender the city. He guaranteed the safety of the city's residents, with their riches, beliefs, and honor. Constantine valiantly refused the offer. After more than a month of fighting, Mehmed's advisors were beginning to lose hope. Against their counsel, Mehmed continued to fight. The night before the final assault, he studied previous attempts to take the city to distinguish potentially successful approaches. On the morning of 29 May 1453 the sultan ordered Adzan (the call to prayer). This was not a regular prayer session for religious reasons but rather a scare tactic: the sight of the entire Ottoman army getting on their knees to pray provided an intimidating display of unity to the Byzantine forces designed to overcome their minds before their bodies.

Once the fighting started, it went on for forty-eight days. The wall was beginning to collapse when Constantine sent a letter to the pope asking for help. In response, the Papacy sent five ships full of reinforcements, weapons, and supplies. Another defense tactic involved Constantine blocking off the Golden Horn so that the Ottoman army could not get ships into it. Mehmed had his people pave a path from oiled tree branches in order to bring eighty ships overland via Galata and placed them into the Golden Horn behind the enemy ships. The Ottoman ships burnt the Byzantine ones in a naval battle.

Since the Byzantine army was still holding on after this defeat, the sultan set up his secret weapon, a huge mobile tower. This tower could hold many soldiers who could be at the same level as the walls of the city, making it easier for them to break into Constantinople. The first group of Ottomans who entered the city were killed almost immediately, with the effect that the other Ottomans began to retreat. Witnessing this, the sultan encouraged his soldiers. Soon after the sultan's encouragement the Ottomans broke the wall in two places and entered the city. In a last attempt to protect it, Constantine attacked the enemy sword raised; however, he was defeated and killed.

Finally, Constantinople was under Ottoman rule. Mehmed entered Constantinople through what is now known as the Topkapi Gate. He immediately rode his horse to the Hagia Sophia which he ordered to be sacked. He ordered that an imam meet him there in order to recite the Muslim Creed: "I testify that there is no God but Allah. I testify that Muhammad is the Prophet of Allah." He turned the Orthodox cathedral into an Islamic mosque, solidifying Turkish rule in Constantinople. Mehmed ordered the city to be plundered for three days. Following the sack, Mehmed's main concern with Constantinople had to do with rebuilding the city's defenses and re-population. Building projects were commenced immediately after the conquest, which included the repair of the walls, construction of the citadel, and building a new palace. Mehmed issued orders across his empire that Muslims, Christians, and Jews should resettle the city; he demanded that five thousand households needed to be deported to Constantinople by September.

=== Imperial capital ===
By 1459, the Sultan dedicated a lot of energy to bringing prosperity to Constantinople. In several quarters of the city pious foundations were created; these areas consisted of a theological college, a school (or a Madrasa, usually connected to the mosque), a public kitchen, and a mosque. In the same year, Mehmed sent out orders that any Greeks who had left Constantinople as slaves or refugees should be allowed to return. These actions led it to become a once again thriving capital city, now of the Ottoman Empire.

Suleiman the Magnificent's reign over the Ottoman Empire from 1520 to 1566 was a period of great artistic and architectural achievements. The famous architect Mimar Sinan designed many mosques and other grand buildings in the city, while Ottoman arts of ceramics and calligraphy also flourished. Many tekkes survive to this day; some in the form of mosques while others have become museums such as the Cerrahi Tekke and the Sünbül Efendi and Ramazan Efendi mosques and türbes in Fatih, the Galata Mevlevihanesi in Beyoğlu, the Yahya Efendi tekke in Beşiktaş, and the Bektaşi Tekke in Kadıköy, which now serves Alevi Muslims as a cemevi.

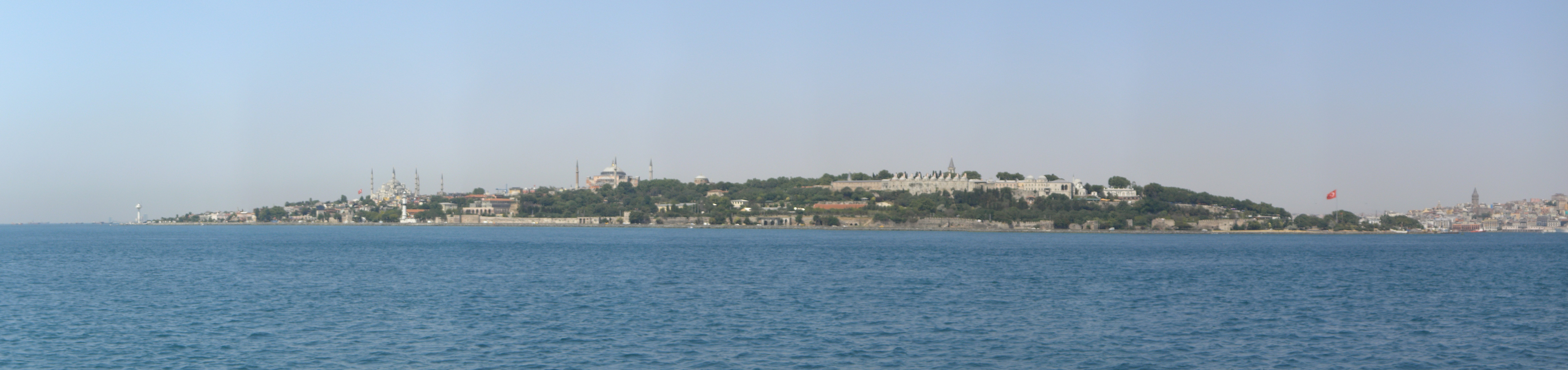
Panoramic view of the historic peninsula of Istanbul, looking westwards from the southern entrance of the Bosporus Strait at the Sea of Marmara. From left to right, the Blue Mosque, the Hagia Sophia and the Topkapı Palace are seen, along with the surviving sections of the Sea Walls of Constantinople. The Galata Tower is seen at the far right of the picture, across the Golden Horn. The arches and vaults of the Byzantine-era Mangana (Armoury) and the Hagios Georgios Monastery which was located inside it are seen between the Blue Mosque and the Hagia Sophia, near the shore (because of its prominent position close to the Seraglio Point, the Mangana Monastery of Hagios Georgios was a well-known landmark for Western sailors who called the Bosporus "the arm of Saint George" since the 13th century.) The dome of the Hagia Irene can be seen to the right of the Hagia Sophia.

In the final years of the Byzantine Empire, the population of Constantinople had fallen steadily, throwing the great imperial city into the shadow of its past glory. For Mehmed II, conquest was only the first stage; the second was giving the old city an entirely new cosmopolitan social structure. Most of what remained of the Byzantine population – a mere 30,000 persons – was deported. According to the Ashikpashazade, a Turkish chronicle,

Mehmed then sent officers to all his lands to announce that whoever wished should come and take possession in Constantinople, as freehold, of houses and orchards and gardens ... Despite this measure the city was not repopulated. So then the Sultan commanded that from every land families, rich and poor alike, should be brought in by force ... and now the city began to be populous.

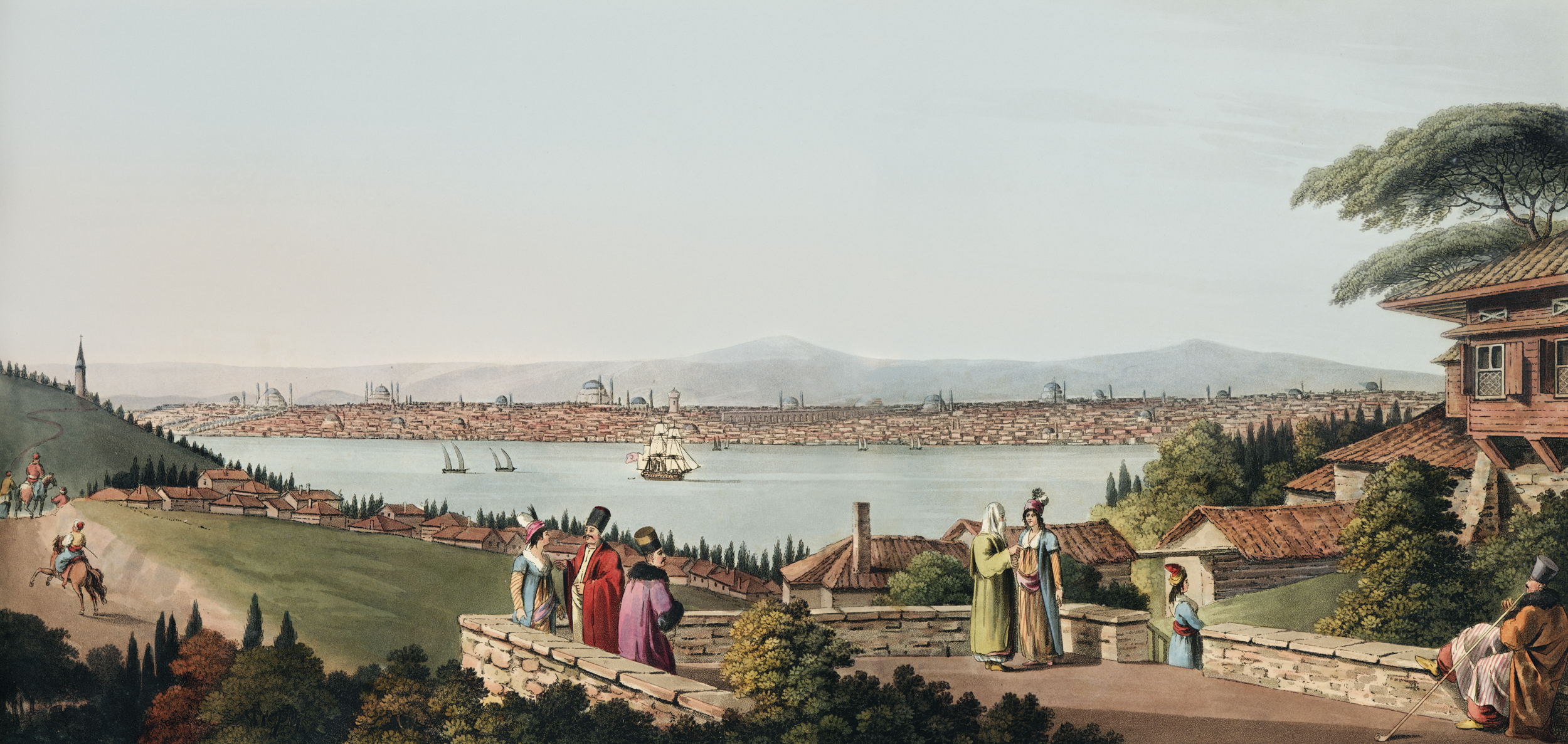
View of Constantinople, painted by Luigi Mayer

Mehmed took much personal interest in the creation of his new capital. On his orders, the great mosque and the college of Fatih were built on the old burial grounds of the Byzantine Emperors at the Church of the Holy Apostles. Bit by bit the great Christian city was transformed into a great Muslim city. Even so, the city was not to be entirely Muslim, at least not until the late 20th century. Slavs, Greeks, Jews, and Armenians, all of whose diverse skills were needed, were allowed to settle in a city which was to become known as alem penah-refuge of the universe. According to the census of 1477, there were 9,486 houses occupied by Muslims; 3,743 by Greeks; 1,647 by Jews; 267 by Christians from the Crimea, and 31 Gypsies. Mehmet also re-established Constantinople, as it was still called at that time, as the center of the Orthodox patriarchate.

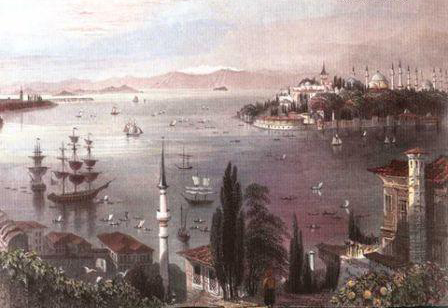
View of the Seraglio Point from Pera, with the Bosphorus at left, the entrance of the Golden Horn at right, and the Sea of Marmara with the Princes' Islands on the horizon

There was also an Italian community in the area of the Galata Tower. Having surrendered before the fall of the city, Mehmed allowed them to preserve an element of self-government. For generations after, they supplied interpreters and diplomats for the Ottoman Court. After the conquest of Egypt in 1517, and the Sultan's acceptance of the position of Caliph, Constantinople acquired additional importance in Muslim eyes. Mosques built by Sultan Suleiman I and his successors gave the city the unique appearance it still preserves today. The individual communities, though, still lived in self-contained areas.

A 16th century Chinese geographical treatise described Constantinople/Istanbul as follows:

Its city has two walls. A sovereign prince lives in the city. There are Muslims wearing headwraps and Han-Chinese. There are translators. People cultivated dry fields. It has no products.

The statement that there were translators suggests it was a multilingual, multicultural, cosmopolitan city. Although the claim that there were "Han-Chinese" is dubious.

Until the eighteenth century, living standards were at least equal to most of Europe. For example, the development of urban craftsmen's wages was on a level similar to southern and central Europe during the sixteenth to eighteenth century.

=== Foundations ===
"Foundation" is waqf (vakıf) in Turkish. The Grand Bazaar (1455) and Topkapı Palace (1459) were erected in the years following the Turkish conquest. Religious foundations were endowed to fund the building of mosques such as the Fatih (1463) and their associated schools and public baths. The city had to be repopulated by a mixture of force and encouragement.

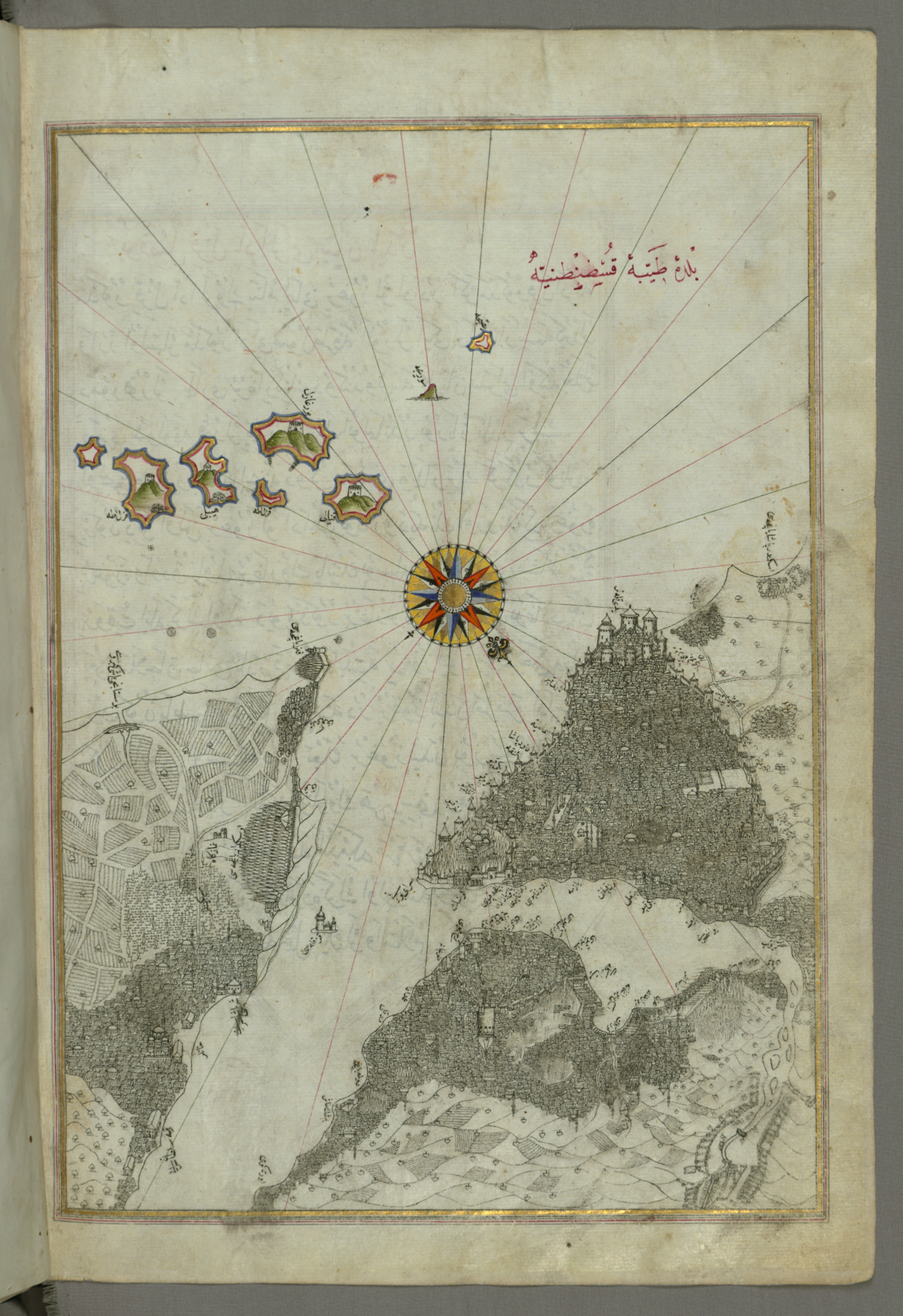
A map of the city from a 17th-century copy of the Piri Reis book, Kitab-ı Bahriye refers to the city as Kostantiniyye (Walters Art Museum collection). North is at the bottom. The Prince Islands are at the top. The old city of Constantinople or Stamboul (modern-day Fatih) is on the right. Across the Golden Horn at bottom right is Pera (Beyoğlu). Asiatic Istanbul (Üsküdar/Scutari, Kadıköy) lies across the Bosphorus on the left.

Süleyman's reign was a time of great artistic and architectural achievements. The architect Sinan designed many mosques and other great buildings in the city, while Ottoman arts of ceramics and calligraphy also flourished.

Sufi orders which were so widespread in the Islamic world and who had many followers who had actively participated in the conquest of the city came to settle in the capital. During Ottoman times over 100 Tekkes were active in the city alone. Many of these Tekkes survive to this day some in the form of mosques while others as museums such as the Jerrahi Tekke in Fatih, the Sunbul Effendi and Ramazan Effendi Mosque and Turbes also in Fatih, the Galata Mevlevihane in Beyoğlu, the Yahya Effendi Tekke in Beşiktaş, and the Bektashi Tekke in Kadıköy, which now serves Alevi Muslims as a Cem Evi.

=== Modernisation ===
As the years passed the population increased, from about 80,000 at the death of Mehmet, to 300,000 by the 18th century, and 400,000 in 1800. The capital of an empire that stretched across Europe, Asia, and Africa, it also became an important diplomatic centre, with several foreign embassies. It was only after 1922, following the war between Greece and Turkey that things began to change.

The city was modernized from the 1870s onwards with the building of bridges, the creation of a proper water system, the use of electric lights, and the introduction of trams and telephones.

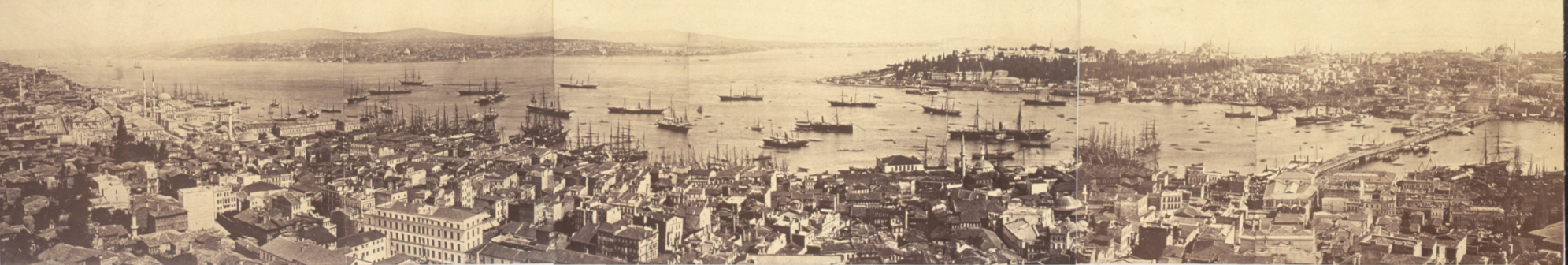
Panoramic view of the city in the 1870s as seen from Galata Tower
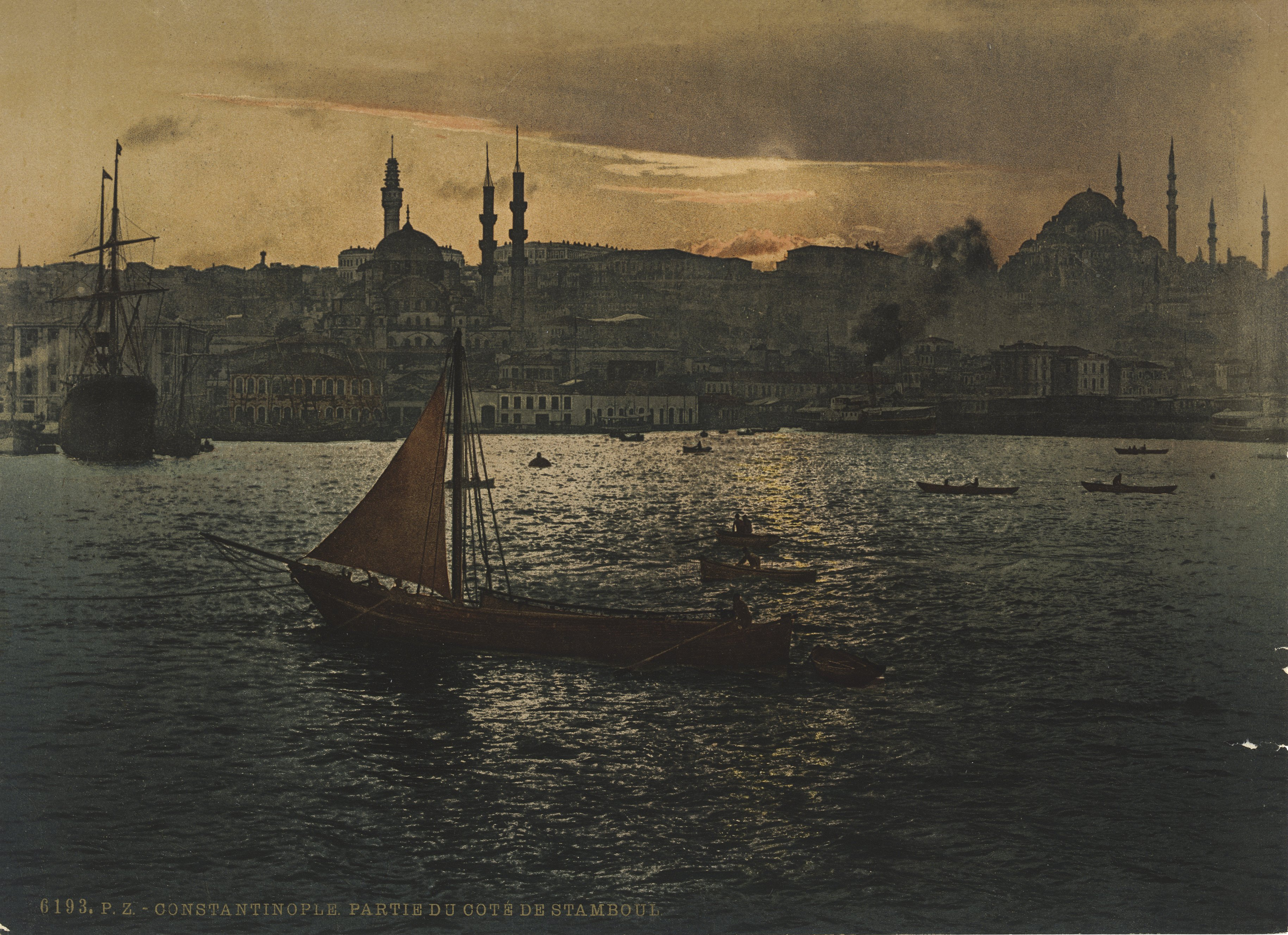
Stamboul (the old walled city), around 1896

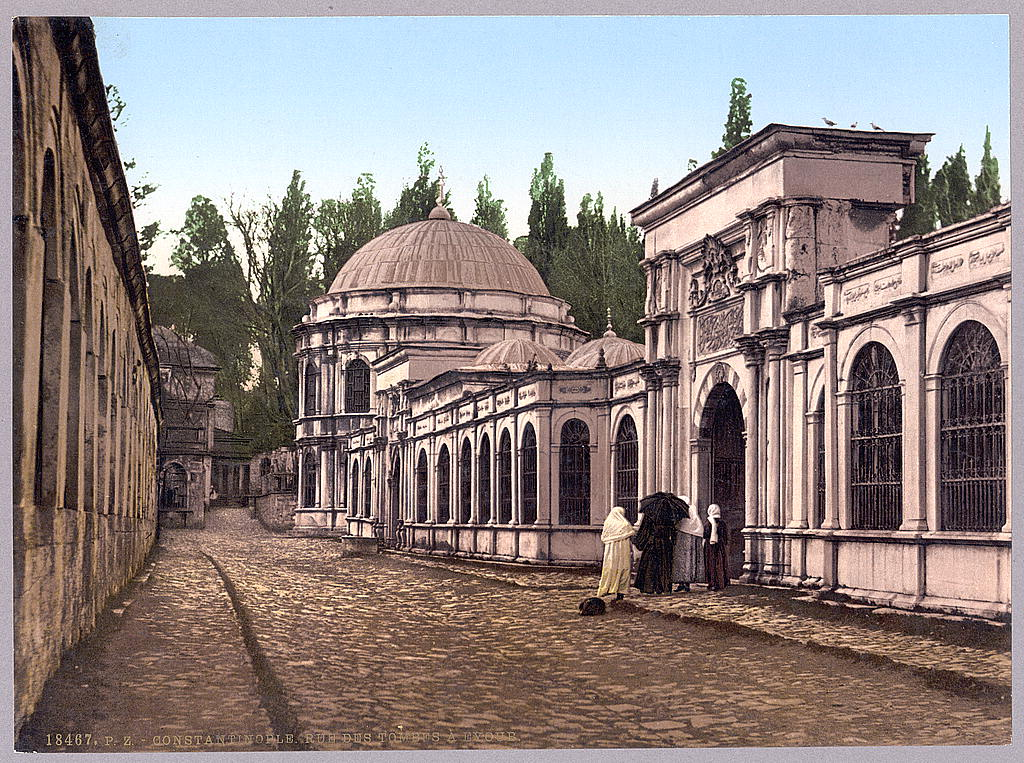
A street in Eyüp in 1890s

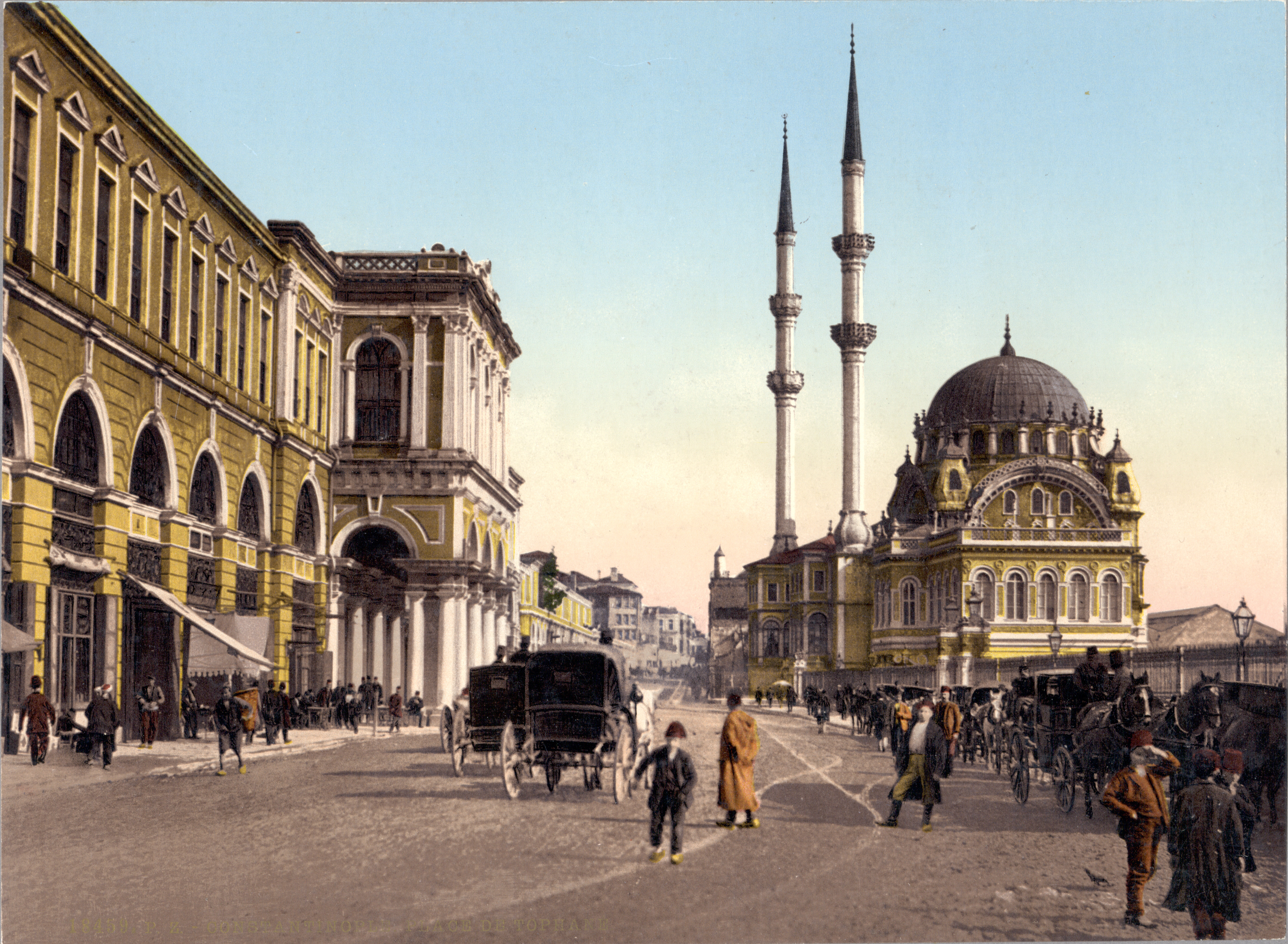
Tophane in 1890s

== Republic of Turkey ==
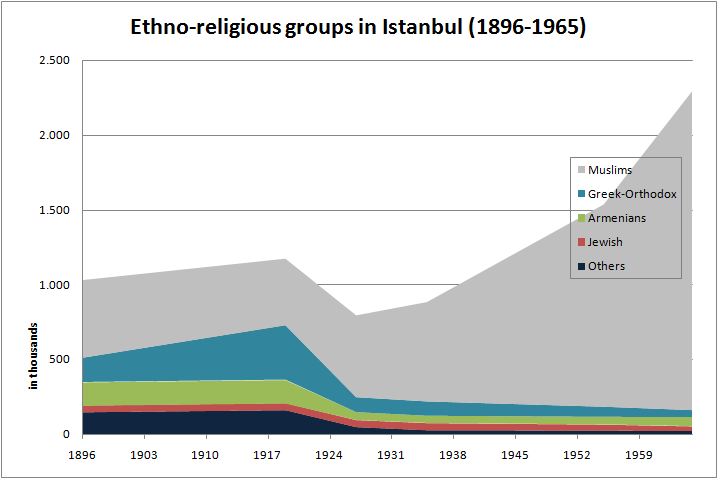
Ethno-religious groups in Istanbul (1896-1965). A multicultural city in 1896, with a 50.5% Muslim population, turned into a predominantly Muslim one after 1925. See Demographics of Istanbul.

In 1915, after the Ottoman entry into World War I on the side of the Central Powers, the Allies led by First Lord of the Admiralty Winston Churchill's Royal Navy attempted an operation to capture Constantinople. It failed after the Ottoman Army repulsed the British Army and ANZAC landing force in the Gallipoli campaign. After the First World War, the Armistice of Mudros and the Treaty of Sèvres decreed that Constantinople would be occupied by Allied Forces. On 13 November 1918, the Occupation of Constantinople by Allied forces began, ending on 4 October 1923 with the Treaty of Lausanne.

When the Republic of Turkey was founded under Mustafa Kemal Atatürk (then known as Mustafa Kemal Pasha) on 29 October 1923 during the Turkish War of Independence, the capital was moved from Constantinople to Angora, which became Ankara in English. As a consequence, the population collapsed, from an estimated 1,125,000 in 1914 to about 500,000 in 1924; but the population steadily grew during the later 20th century, the metropolitan population surpassing 10 million in the year 2000.

The city's current name İstanbul is a shortened version with a Turkish character of the Medieval Greek phrase "εἰς τὴν Πόλιν" [is tin ˈpolin], meaning "to the city", which had long been in vernacular use by the local population. The international name Constantinople also remained in use until Turkey adopted the Latin alphabet in 1928 and urged other countries to use the city's Turkish name in their languages and their postal service networks. In 1929 Lloyd's agents were informed that telegrams now must be addressed to "Istanbul" or "Stamboul", but The Times stated that mail could still be delivered to "Constantinople". However, The New York Times stated that year that mail to "Constantinople" may no longer be delivered. In 1929 Turkish Nationalists advocated for the usage of Istanbul in English instead of Constantinople. The U.S. State Department began using "Istanbul" in May 1930.

With the establishment of the new Turkish Republic, built on a wave of nationalism, there was a mass exodus of much of the Greek and Armenian population from Istanbul, which had ceased to be the capital. After the pogrom of 1955, the remaining fraction also departed.

In the early years of the republic, Istanbul was overlooked in favour of Ankara, the new capital. However, starting from the late 1940s and early 1950s, Istanbul underwent a great structural change, as new public squares (such as Taksim Square), boulevards and avenues were constructed throughout the city; sometimes at the expense of the demolition of many historical buildings.

In September 1955, many ethnic Greek businesses were destroyed during the Istanbul pogrom. This accelerated the departure of Greeks from the city and Turkey. Jews, Armenians, and Georgians were also targeted.

Starting from the 1970s, the population of Istanbul began to rapidly increase, as people from Anatolia migrated to the city to find employment in the many new factories that were constructed at the outskirts of the sprawling metropolis. This sudden sharp rise in the city's population caused a large demand for housing development, and many previously outlying villages and forests became engulfed into the greater metropolitan area of Istanbul.

In March 1995, twenty-three people were killed and hundreds were injured in the incidents called Gazi Massacre. The events began with an armed attack on several coffee shops in the neighborhood, where an Alevi religious leader was killed. Protests occurred both in Gazi and Ümraniye district on the Asian side of İstanbul. Police responded with gunfire.

Recep Tayyip Erdoğan, later Prime Minister of Turkey and President of Turkey, served as mayor of Istanbul from 1994 to 1998.

In 2013, Taksim Square was the center of the Gezi Park protests, where protesters protested a wide range of concerns at the core of which were issues of freedom of the press, of expression, assembly, and the government's encroachment on Turkey's secularism.

In January 2016, a suicide bomb attack on Sultanahmet Square, near the famous Blue Mosque, killed 10 people, all of them German tourists.

In July 2016, the Turkish coup d'état attempt took place. A number of rogue government units took over and were only repelled after a few hours. The troops that had taken part in the coup attempt surrendered on the Bosphorus Bridge in Istanbul.

In December 2016, a twin bomb attack on police officers outside the football stadium of top-division team Besiktas killed 38 people and injured many more.

On 20 December 2016, the first road tunnel linking Europe and Asia was opened. Construction of the tunnel took over five years. A 5.4 kilometre (3.3 mile) section of the Eurasia Tunnel runs under the Bosphorus in Istanbul.

On 1 January 2017, 39 people were killed in the New Year's Eve attack on an exclusive nightclub in Istanbul. Later a member of the Islamic State group was arrested.

In June 2019, the main Turkish opposition party won the rerun of Istanbul’s mayoral election, meaning Republican People’s Party (CHP) candidate Ekrem Imamoglu became new Mayor of Istanbul.

Istanbul’s new airport opened in October 2018, but commenced passenger services in April 2019, and cargo services in February 2022. The new Istanbul Airport replaced the old Atatürk Airport. The new Istanbul airport is one of the biggest airports in the world in terms of passenger traffic.

In November 2022, a street bombing in Istanbul's lively Istiklal Avenue killed six people and wounded over 80. Turkish authorities blamed the outlawed Kurdistan Workers' Party (PKK) as well as Syrian Kurdish militia (YPG). The PKK denied any involvement.

As of August 2023, there are more than 530 000 refugees of the Syrian civil war in Istanbul, the highest number of Syrian refugees in any Turkish city.

In March 2025, hundreds of thousands of pro-democracy demonstrators gathered in the streets of Istanbul to show support for city's mayor Ekrem Imamoglu, the main rival of Turkey's President Recep Tayyip Erdogan. Imamoglu was arrested on corruption charges, which were seen as politically motivated by his supporters.

== See also ==
- Timeline of Istanbul
