= Istanbul University Observatory =

Istanbul University Observatory İstanbul Üniversitesi Gozlemevi
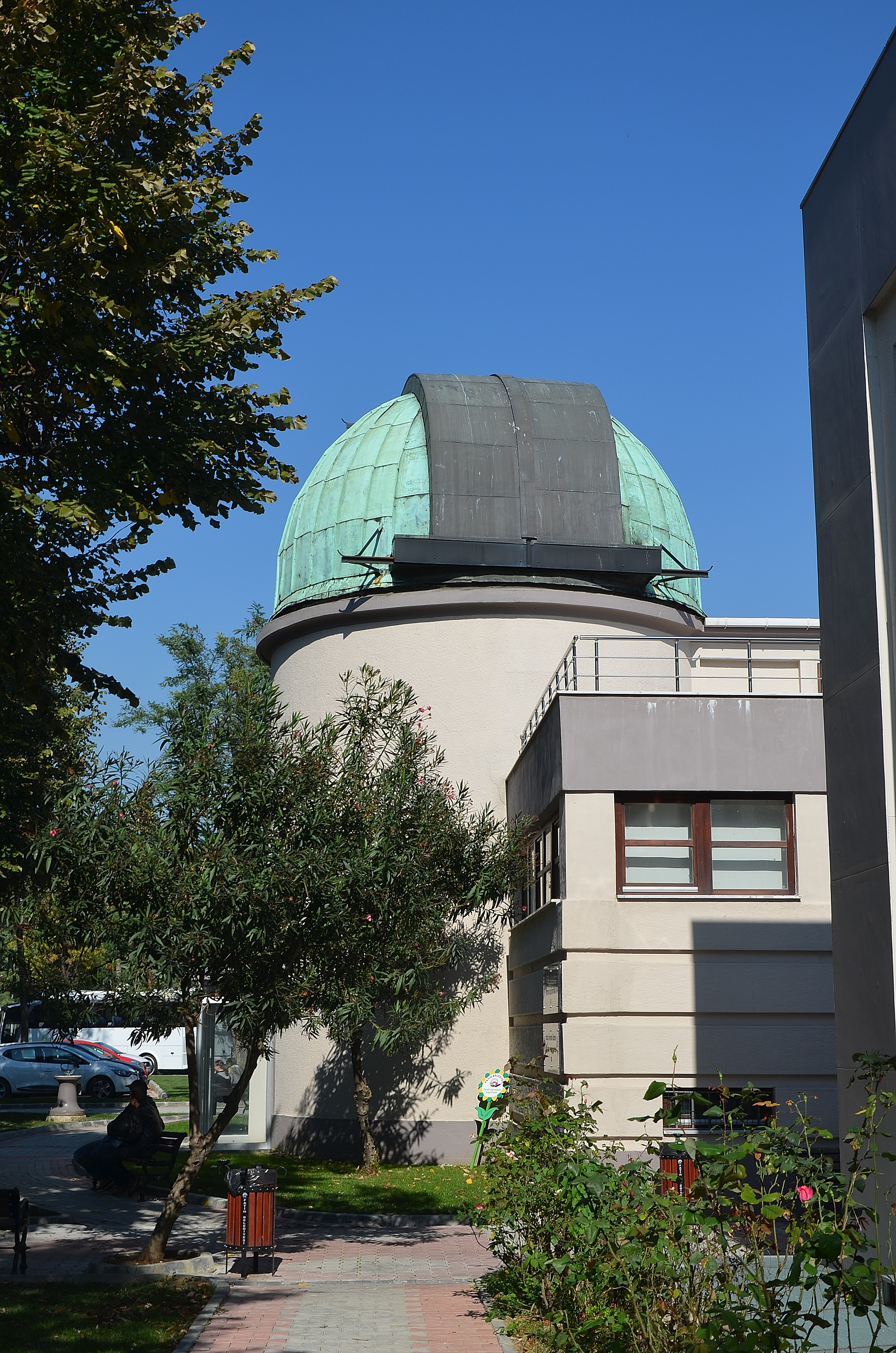
- Istanbul University Observatory.
- Organization: Astronomy and Space Sciences Department; Faculty of Science; Istanbul University
- Observatory code: 080
- Location: Istanbul, Turkey
- Coordinates: 41°00′45″N 28°57′56″E
- Established: 1936
- Website: www.istanbul.edu.tr/fen/en/gozlemevi.php

Telescopes
- Astrograph: 30 cm Carl Zeiss Jena
- Photosphere: 13 cm telescope
- Chromosphere: 12 cm telescope
- Related media on Commons

The Istanbul University Observatory (Turkish: İstanbul Üniversitesi Gözlemevi) is a ground-based astronomical observatory operated by the Astronomy and Space Sciences Department at Istanbul University's Faculty of Science. Established in 1936, it is situated next to the historic Beyazıt Tower within the main campus of the university at Beyazıt Square in Fatih district of Istanbul, Turkey.

== History ==
Soon after the foundation of the Faculty of Science at Istanbul University in 1933, German astronomer Erwin Finlay-Freundlich was invited to direct the Department of Astronomy. He suggested to establish an observatory. The observatory building with dome was designed by architect Arif Hikmet Holtay. Its groundbreaking took place in December 1935, and the construction, conducted by Ekrem Hakkı Ayverdi, was completed within six months. It became ready for use in the summer of 1936.

As the main instrument of the observatory, an astrograph was ordered to Carl Zeiss Jena in Germany on December 11, 1935. The instrument arrived in Istanbul disassembled in twelve pieces on September 25, 1936, and was installed in the observatory's dome. The facility started its observations in the fall of 1936. It is the first modern observatory of Turkey.

The air and light pollution in downtown Istanbul, where the observatory is located, make it impossible to conduct night observations. For conducting night sky studies, the department initiated a project to establish an observatory at the Onsekiz Mart University in Çanakkale, which was realized in 2002.

== Instruments ==
Currently, the observatory consists of following telescopes and instruments:

Astrograph

- Diameter: 30 cm (12 in)
- Focal ratio: f/5
- Focal length: 150 cm (59 in)
- Max. size of photographic plate at focal plane: 24 cm × 24 cm (9.4 in × 9.4 in)

Photosphere telescope

- Diameter: 13 cm (5.1 in)
- Focal ratio: f/15
- Focal length: 200 cm (79 in)

Used for the observation of sun spots and plage areas.

Chromosphere telescope

- Diameter: 12 cm (4.7 in)
- Focal ratio: f/19
- Focal length: 232 cm (91 in)

Used for the observation of the structure and interesting phenomena of Sun's chromosphere supported with a monochromator (H-alpha Lyot filter) and a camera (Canon F-1) placed on the focal plane.

Pilot telescope

- Diameter: 7 cm (2.8 in)
- Focal ratio: f/13
- Focal length: 90 cm (35 in)
