= Fil Bridge =

Fil Bridge Fil Köprüsü
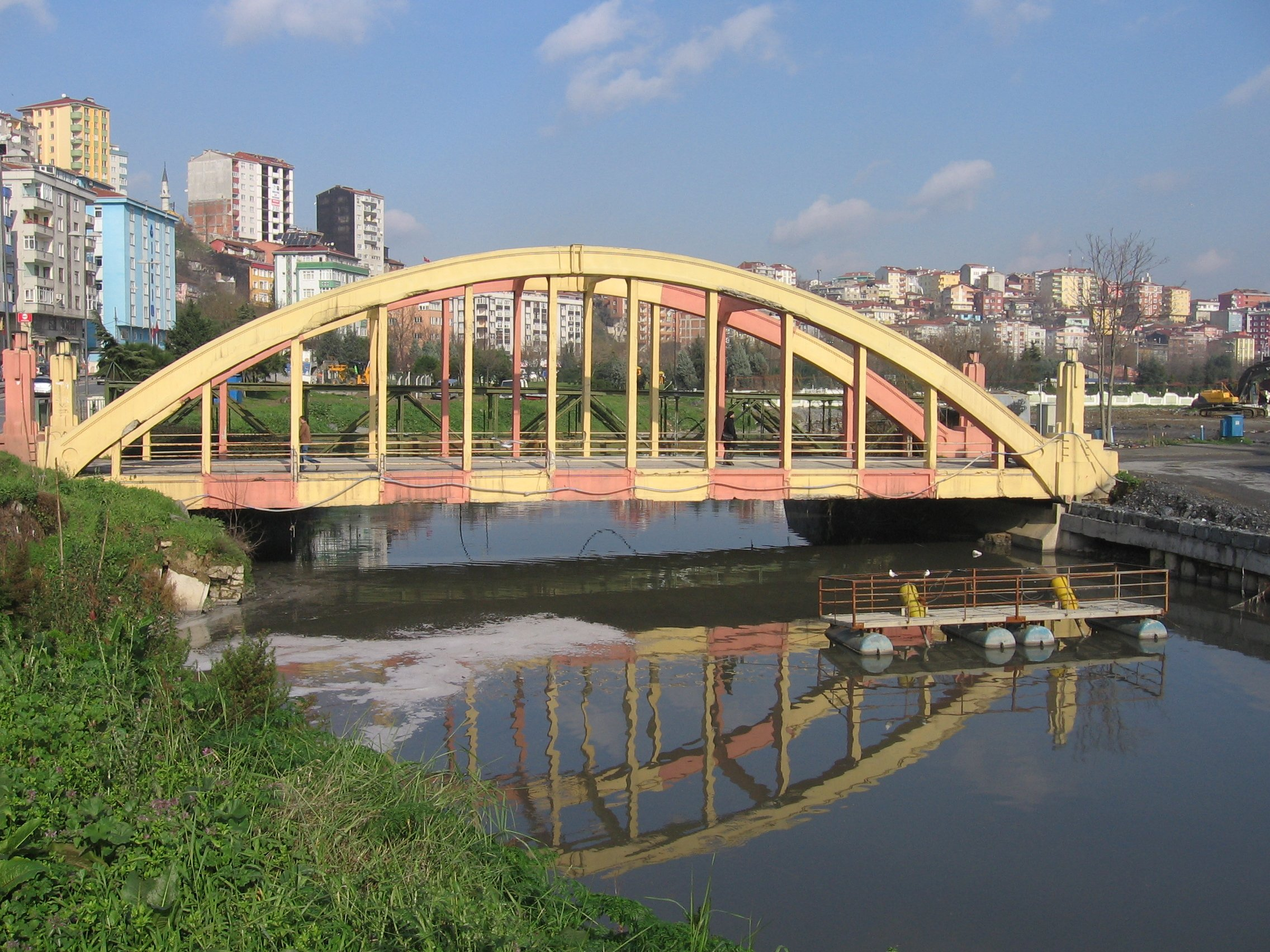
- Coordinates: 41.068341°N 28.943381°E
- Carries: Fil Köprü Avenue
- Crosses: Alibeyköy Creek
- Locale: Eyüp, Istanbul, Turkey
- Official name: Fil Köprüsü
- Other name(s): Silahtarağa Köprüsü; Silahtarağa Bridge
- Owner: Metropolitan Municipality of Istanbul

Characteristics
- Total length: 38 m (125 ft)
- Width: 7 m (23 ft)

History
- Designer: Naşit Arıkan
- Construction start: 25 August 1930
- Construction end: 1932; 94 years ago
- Construction cost: 122,917 Turkish lira

Location
- Interactive map of Fil Bridge

The Fil Bridge (Turkish: Fil Köprüsü), also known as Silahtarağa Bridge (Turkish: Silahtarağa Köprüsü) is a 38 m (125 ft) long, concrete bowstring bridge that crosses the Alibeyköy Creek in Istanbul, Turkey. The bridge was completed in 1932 by the Istanbul Metropolitan Municipality.

The bridge is closed to automobile traffic, with the exception of motorcycles, and is a pedestrian bridge.
