= İdealtepe railway station =

İdealtepe

General information
- Location: Turgut Özal Blv., İdealtepe Mah. Maltepe, Istanbul; Turkey
- Coordinates: 40.9372°N 29.1146°E
- Owner: Turkish State Railways
- Operator: TCDD Taşımacılık
- Line: Istanbul-Ankara railway
- Platforms: 1 island platform
- Tracks: 3
- Connections: IETT Bus: 4, 16D, 222, E-9; Istanbul Minibus: Bostancı-Kartal, Bostancı-Pendik

Construction
- Parking: No

History
- Opened: 1966
- Closed: 2013-18
- Rebuilt: 2016-18
- Electrified: 1969; 25 kV AC, 50 Hz Overhead wire

Services
Preceding station	TCDD Taşımacılık	Following station
Küçükyalı towards Halkalı	Marmaray	Süreyya Plajı towards Gebze
Former services
Preceding station	Turkish State Railways	Following station
Küçükyalı towards Haydarpaşa	Haydarpaşa suburban	Süreyya Plajı towards Gebze
Track layout
Location

İdealtepe railway station (Turkish: İdealtepe istasyonu) is a railway station in Maltepe, Istanbul. Located along Turgut Özal Boulevard and the Sea of Marmara, it was a station on the Haydarpaşa suburban commuter line from 1966 to 2013. The station platforms were rebuilt and expanded for the Marmaray commuter rail system opened on 12 March 2019. Before its demolition, İdealtepe had two side platforms with two tracks. The new station have an island platform with two tracks as well as a third track for express trains.

İdealtepe station was built in 1966 by the Turkish State Railways.
