= Istanbul Book Fair =

Turkey's largest book event

- Status: active
- Genre: fairs, Books
- Location: Istanbul
- Country: Turkey
- Inaugurated: 1982 (44 years ago)
- Website: istanbulkitapfuari.com/en

The Istanbul Book Fair (Turkish: İstanbul Kitap Fuarı) is Turkey's largest book event, held annually since 1982.
