= 70 Million Steps Against Coups =

70 Million Steps Against Coups (Turkish: Darbeye Karşı 70 Milyon Adım) were a series of rallies that took place in Turkey in support of the Anti-militarism against Republic Protests. Trade unions and non-governmental organizations attended the protests. The first rally took place in Istanbul on 21 July 2008.
