= Yedikule Anatolian High School =

Location
- Fatih, Istanbul; Turkey
- 40.99758°N 28.92522°E

Information
- Type: Public
- Established: 1968
- Headmaster: Namık Kemal Yurttaş
- Enrollment: 1071
- Colors: Grey, baby blue and white
- Website: yedikuleanadolulisesi.meb.k12.tr

Yedikule Anatolian High School (Turkish: Yedikule Anadolu Lisesi) is a public high school situated in the Yedikule neighborhood of Fatih, Istanbul, Turkey. It was founded in 1968.

== See also ==
- List of schools in Istanbul
