= Küçükyalı railway station =

Küçükyalı
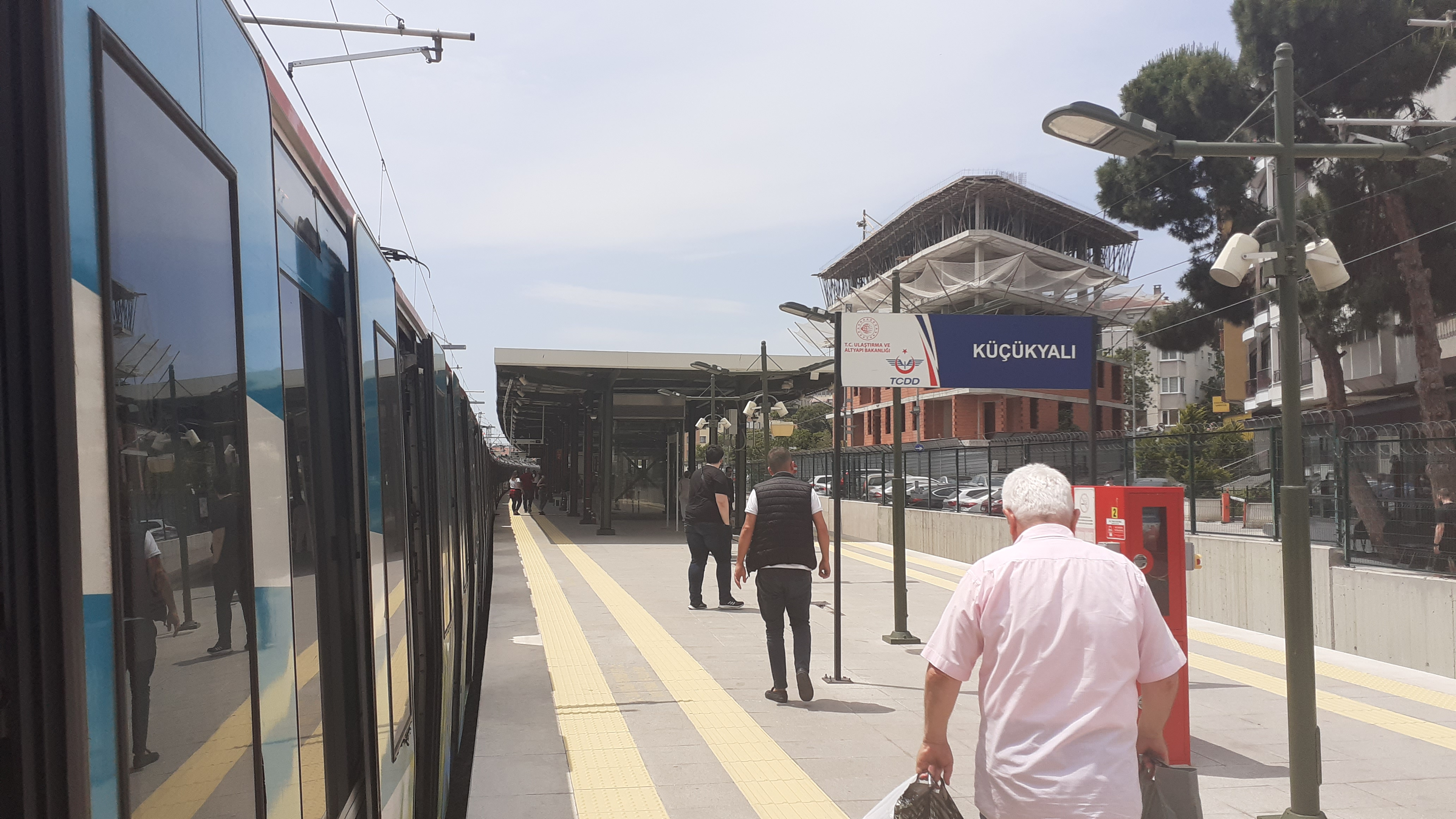

General information
- Location: Bağdat Cd., Küçükyalı Mah. 34744; Maltepe, Istanbul; Turkey
- Coordinates: 40.9461°N 29.1092°E
- Owner: Turkish State Railways
- Operator: TCDD Taşımacılık
- Line: Istanbul-Ankara railway
- Platforms: 1 island platform
- Tracks: 3
- Connections: IETT Bus: 16, 17, 17L, 17S, 19FB, 252; Istanbul Minibus: Kadıköy-Pendik

Construction
- Parking: No

History
- Opened: 22 September 1872
- Closed: 2013-18
- Rebuilt: 2016-18
- Electrified: 1969; 25 kV AC, 50 Hz Overhead wire

Services
Preceding station	TCDD Taşımacılık	Following station
Bostancı towards Halkalı	Marmaray	İdealtepe towards Gebze
Former services
Preceding station	Turkish State Railways	Following station
Bostancı towards Haydarpaşa	Haydarpaşa suburban	İdealtepe towards Gebze
Track layout
Location

Küçükyalı railway station (Turkish: Küçükyalı istasyonu) is a railway station in Maltepe, Istanbul. It was a station on the Haydarpaşa suburban commuter line from 1951 to 2013 and is the westernmost station in Maltepe. The station platforms were rebuilt and expanded for the Marmaray commuter rail system that opened on 12 March 2019. Before its demolition, Küçükyalı had two side platforms with two tracks. The new station have an island platform with two tracks as well as a third track for express trains.

Küçükyalı station was opened on 22 September 1872 by the Ottoman government as part of a railway from Kadıköy to İzmit.
