= Istanbul Championship League =

Soccer league

The Istanbul Championship League was a soccer league that operated for just one year, 1914. Fenerbahçe S.K. won this league.

== League table ==
1. Fenerbahçe
2. Türk İdman Ocağı
3. Darüşşafaka SK
4. Hilal
5. Darülmuallimin
