= Fenerbahçe railway station =

Defunct railway station in Istanbul, Turkey

Fenerbahçe

General information
- Location: Atlıhan Sk., Fenerbahçe Mah. 34726; Kadıköy/Istanbul; Turkey
- Coordinates: 40.9690°N 29.0382°E
- Owner: Ottoman Anatolian Railway
- Platforms: 1 side platform
- Tracks: 1

History
- Opened: 27 April 1873
- Closed: 1928
- Former names: Fener Bahçesi
Location

Fenerbahçe station (Turkish: Fenerbahçe istasyonu) was a railway station in the Fenerbahçe neighborhood of Kadıköy, Istanbul. The station was situated at the end of a 1.4 km (0.87 mi) branch line from Feneryolu. Fenerbahçe station was opened on 27 April 1873 by the Ottoman government, branching off the Haydarpaşa-Pendik railway at Feneryolu. Fenerbahçe, known as Fener Bahçesi at the time, was a popular resort for residents in Constantinople (Istanbul). In 1888 the station, along with the railway, was sold to the Ottoman Anatolian Railway which operated station until 1924, when it was absorbed by the Anatolian—Baghdad Railways.

A small station house, built by an Austrian company, was constructed with a small platform serving one track. Since there was no siding, locomotives needed to push outbound trains back to Feneryolu. Due to its coastal location, the station played an important role during World War I. Injured soldiers, especially from the Gallipoli Front, would arrive by boat and transported by train. During the Occupation of Constantinople, the station was used as an armory for weapons.

Fenerbahçe station was closed in 1928 and the station house was demolished in 1936, when the State Railways built a social facility in its place, which still stands today. The tracks remained for another 35 years until they were removed in 1971.
