= Tekel Birası =

Turkish brand of beer

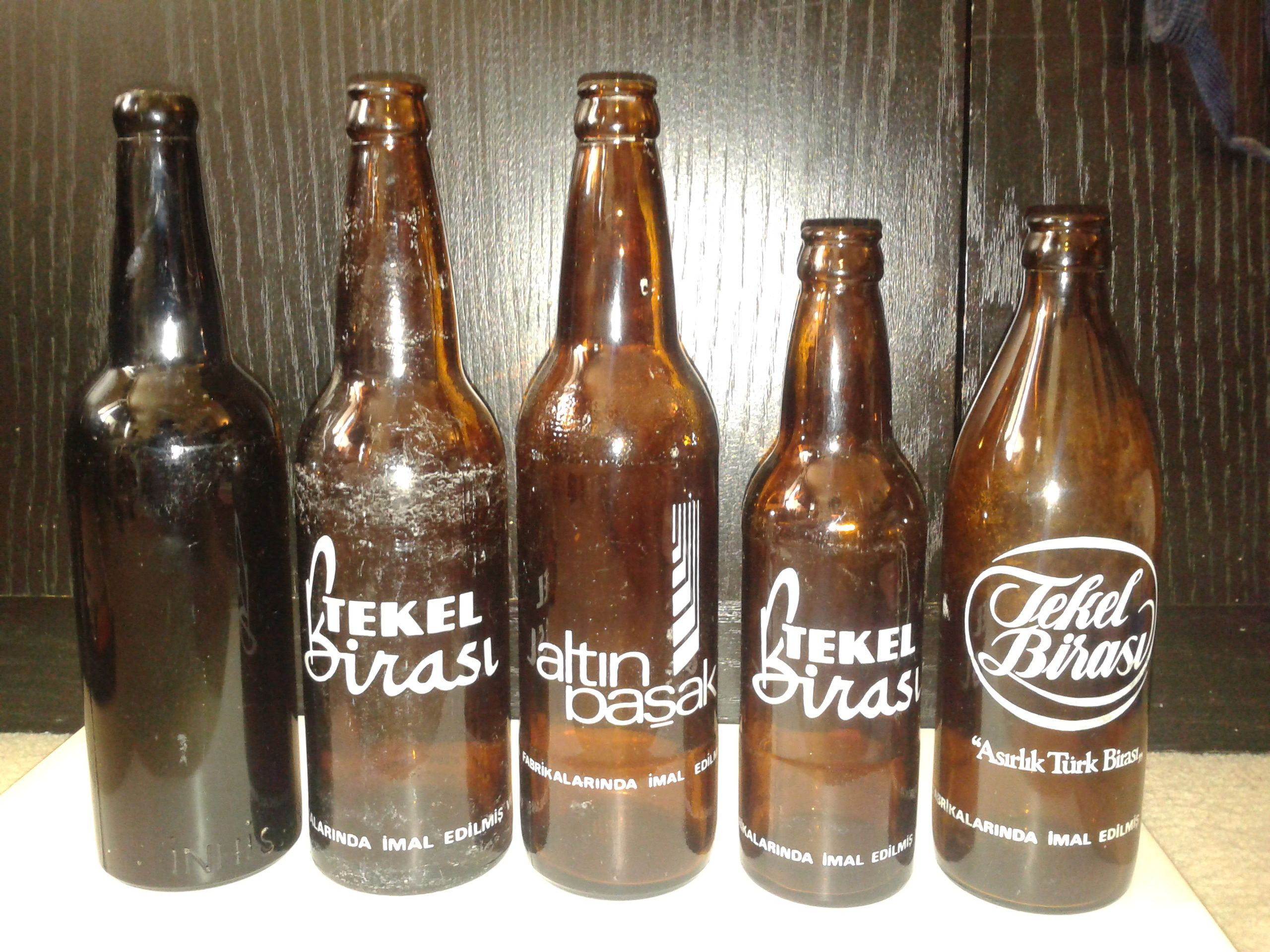
Tekel Birası old bottles

Tekel Birası is a Turkish beer brand. Having first been brewed in Bomonti, Istanbul in 1890, it is known as the oldest brewery brand in the country.

Tekel Birası was a state monopoly brand until 2004. Following the privatisation, the era of Tekel state monopoly has ended and now production is under control of a private company called MEY.

== See also ==
- List of food companies
