= Çukurova (construction firm) =

Turkish construction company

Çukurova Construction
- Founded: 1975
- Headquarters: Istanbul, Turkey
- Owner: Çukurova Holding
- Website: www.cukurova.net

Çukurova is an international construction company based in Istanbul, Turkey, and active in Afghanistan, Libya, Bahrain and other countries. The company trades under the registered name of Çukurova İnşaat (English: Çukurova Construction).

The company's main activities involve drainage systems, highways, and other infrastructure. Approved by NATO they have been involved in a number of reconstruction projects in war-torn Afghanistan including the Sar-e-Haus Dam, and the Kabul-Kandahar highway.
