= List of people from Istanbul =

This is a list of notable people hailing from the city of Istanbul.

== List ==
- Halide Edib Adıvar, novelist, politician
- Müjde Ar, actress
- Oğuz Aral, cartoonist
- Bülent Arel, music producer
- Duygu Asena, women's rights activist
- Hulusi Behçet, dermatologist
- Semiha Berksoy, opera singer
- Orhan Boran, radio and TV host
- Aydın Boysan, architect, academic, author and essayist
- Yaşar Büyükanıt, Chief of the Turkish General Staff
- Eylül Cansın, transgender sex worker
- Cornelius Castoriadis, Greek-French political philosopher
- Hakan Celik, journalist, TV anchorman, radio producer
- Nuri Bilge Ceylan, filmmaker
- Manuel Chrysoloras, Greek academic, diplomat
- Tansu Çiller, former prime minister
- Hrant Dink (1954-2007), editor of an Armenian newspaper
- Volkan Diyaroğlu, artist
- Bülent Ecevit, former prime minister
- Neşe Erberk, Miss Europe 1984
- Recep Tayyip Erdoğan, President of Turkey
- Halit Ergenç, actor
- Sertab Erener, singer
- Ahmet Ertegün, co-founder and executive of Atlantic Records and the New York Cosmos
- Nesuhi Ertegün, co-founder and executive of Atlantic Records and the New York Cosmos
- Yonca Evcimik, pop singer
- Shlomo Gazit (1926–2020), Israeli head of IDF military intelligence, President of Ben-Gurion University
- Leyla Gencer, opera singer
- Fatma Girik, actress
- Ali Ferit Gören (1913–1987), Austrian-Turkish Olympic sprinter
- Gregory V, Greek Patriarch of Constantinople
- Ara Güler, photographer
- Tunç Hamarat, correspondence chess world champion 2004
- Tunch Ilkin, former American football player, TV anchor
- Ertuğrul Işınbark, stage magician
- Nihat Kahveci, football player
- İrem Karamete (born 1993), Olympic fencer
- Adila Khanum, wife of Hussein bin Ali, King of Hejaz
- Berç Keresteciyan Türker, Ottoman-Turkish bank executive and politician
- Hülya Koçyiğit, actress
- Bergüzar Korel, actress
- Fahri Korutürk, former president of Turkey
- Lefter Küçükandonyadis, football player
- Mike Lazaridis, founder of Research in Motion
- Nasuh Mahruki, first Turkish person to summit Mt. Everest
- Barış Manço, musician
- Andrew Mango, British author
- Arif Mardin, music producer
- Giulio Mongeri, Turkish Levantine architect
- Kleanthis Maropoulos, Greek footballer
- Alexander Mavrocordatos, Greek dragoman to Sultan Mehmed IV
- Iskouhi Minas (1884–1951), French poet and novelist of Armenian descent, born in Istanbul
- Leone Minassian (1905–1978), Italian painter of Armenian descent, born in Istanbul
- Kostas Negrepontis, Greek footballer
- Aziz Nesin, novelist
- Marika Nezer, Greek singer
- Altay Öktem, Turkish poet, writer, researcher and doctor
- Irfan Orga, Turkish Air Force fighter pilot, diplomat, writer
- Leon Walerian Ostroróg, jurist of Polish descent, adviser to the Ottoman government
- Orhan Pamuk, novelist
- Gustaf Palm, Swedish supercargo for the Swedish East India Company
- Elisabeth Palm, Swedish etcher and printmaker
- Sadettin Pasha, Ottoman pasha
- Pekinel sisters, twin pianists
- Ajda Pekkan, singer
- Veronica of the Passion, ottoman-born English Catholic nun who founded the Sisters of the Apostolic Carmel
- Athinodoros Prousalis, Greek actor
- Nicola Rossi-Lemeni, opera singer
- Michael Babington Smith, British banker, sportsman and soldier from the Babington family
- Alexandros Soutsos, Greek poet and partisan
- Tariq bin Taimur Al Said, was a member of the Omani royal family
- Haldun Taner, playwright
- Hidayet Türkoğlu, basketball player
- Fatih Tutak, chef
- Antonietta Gambara Untersteiner, composer
- Sevgi Uzun, WNBA player
- Orhan Veli, poet
- Stavros Xenidis, Greek actor
- Hamza Yerlikaya, wrestler and Olympic gold medalist
- Erol Yesilkaya, Turkish-German screenwriter
- Cem Yılmaz, stand-up comedian, actor
- Gönül Engin Yılmaz, artist
- Alexander Ypsilantis (senior), Greek diplomat
- Alexander Ypsilantis (junior), Greek military commander
- Constantine Ypsilantis, Greek revolutionary

== See also ==
- List of people from Constantinople (between the 3rd century and 1453 CE)
- Notable people from Byzantium (before the 3rd century CE)
- List of museums and monuments in Istanbul
- List of urban centers in Istanbul
- List of universities in Istanbul
- List of schools in Istanbul
- List of architectural structures in Istanbul
- List of columns and towers in Istanbul
- List of libraries in Istanbul
- List of mayors of Istanbul
