= List of sport facilities in Istanbul =

The list of sport facilities in Istanbul, Turkey, lists the relevant architectural entities within the city limits. These include major stadiums, arenas and indoor sports halls, as well as sports clubs.

The largest stadium in Istanbul is Atatürk Olympic Stadium, which was claimed to have hosted as many as 118,000 fans during a Kanye West concert in 2026.

== Major stadiums and arenas ==
=== Olympic and athletic complexes ===
- Atatürk Olympic Stadium
- Ataköy Athletics Arena

=== Football ===
- Bahçelievler Stadium
- Başakşehir Fatih Terim Stadium
- Güngören M.Yahya Baş Stadyumu
- Recep Tayyip Erdoğan Stadium
- Şükrü Saracoğlu Stadium
- Rams Park
- Vodafone Park
- Ali Sami Yen Stadium (demolished)
- BJK İnönü Stadium (demolished)
- Taksim Stadium (demolished)

=== Basketball and volleyball (indoors) ===
- Abdi İpekçi Arena (demolished)
- Ahmet Cömert Sport Hall
- Ayhan Sahenk Sport Hall
- Beykoz Sport Hall
- BJK Akatlar Arena
- Burhan Felek Sport Hall
- Caferağa Sport Hall
- Cebeci Sport Hall
- Haldun Alagas Sport Hall
- Hamdi Akın Sports Hall
- Sinan Erdem Dome
- Ülker Sports Arena
- Lütfi Kırdar ICEC (formerly used as a sports hall)

=== Racing circuits ===
- Istanbul Park - Formula One Grand Prix Circuit

== Club venues ==
Club	Sport	Established	League	Venue	Ref.
Beşiktaş	Football	1903	Süper Lig	Beşiktaş Stadium	
Galatasaray	Football	1905	Süper Lig	Türk Telekom Arena	
Fenerbahçe	Football	1907	Süper Lig	Şükrü Saracoğlu Stadium	
Kasımpaşa	Football	1921	Süper Lig	Recep Tayyip Erdoğan Stadium	
İstanbul Başakşehir	Football	1990	Süper Lig	Başakşehir Fatih Terim Stadium	
Fatih Karagümrük	Football	1926	Süper Lig	Atatürk Olympic Stadium	
İstanbulspor	Football	1913	Süper Lig	Necmi Kadıoğlu Stadium	
Ümraniyespor	Football	1938	Süper Lig	Ümraniye İlçe Stadium	
Eyüpspor	Football	1919	TFF First League	Eyüp Stadium	
Pendikspor	Football	1950	TFF First League	Pendik Stadium	
Tuzlaspor	Football	1954	TFF First League	Tuzla Belediyesi Stadium	
Sarıyer S.K.	Football	1940	TFF Second League	Yusuf Ziya Öniş Stadium	
Arnavutköy Belediyespor	Football	2004	TFF Second League	Bolluca Stadium	
Esenler Erokspor	Football	1959	TFF Second League	Esenler Stadium	
Bayrampaşaspor	Football	1959	TFF Third League	Çetin Emeç Stadium	
Beyoğlu Yeni Çarşı FK	Football	1997	TFF Third League	Maltepe Stadium	
Çatalcaspor	Football	1942	TFF Third League	Müjdat Gürsu Stadium	
Büyükçekmece Tepecikspor	Football	1988	TFF Third League	Tepecik Şenol Güneş Stadium	
Bulvarspor	Football	1985	TFF Third League	Bulvar Mimar Kubilay Köse Stadium	
Şile Yıldızspor	Football	1900	TFF Third League	Şile Stadium	
Galatasaray	Basketball	1911	Turkish Basketball League	Abdi İpekçi Arena	
Fenerbahçe Ülker	Basketball	1913	Turkish Basketball League	Ülker Sports Arena	
Beşiktaş	Basketball	1933	Turkish Basketball League	BJK Akatlar Arena	
Darüşşafaka Doğuş	Basketball	1951	Turkish Basketball League	Ayhan Şahenk Arena	
Anadolu Efes	Basketball	1976	Turkish Basketball League	Abdi İpekçi Arena	
İstanbul BB	Basketball	2000	Turkish Basketball League	Cebeci Sport Hall	
İTÜ	Basketball	1953	Turkish Second Basketball League	ITU Ayazaga Sports Center	
Pertevniyal	Basketball	1968	Turkish Second Basketball League	Ahmet Cömert Sport Hall	
İstanbul DSİ	Basketball	2012	Turkish Second Basketball League	Caferağa Sport Hall	
Tüyap Büyükçekmece	Basketball	2011	Turkish Second Basketball League	Mimar Sinan Koleji Sports Hall	
Galatasaray Daikin	Volleyball	1922	Turkish Women's Volleyball League	Burhan Felek Sport Hall	
Fenerbahçe Grundig	Volleyball	1928	Turkish Women's Volleyball League	Burhan Felek Sport Hall	
Beşiktaş	Volleyball	1961	Turkish Women's Volleyball League	BJK Akatlar Arena	
Vakıfbank	Volleyball	1986	Turkish Women's Volleyball League	Burhan Felek Sport Hall	
Eczacıbaşı	Volleyball	1977	Turkish Women's Volleyball League	Eczacıbaşı Sports Hall	
Sarıyer Belediyespor	Volleyball	1990	Turkish Women's Volleyball League	Sarıyer Sports Hall	

== Sports clubs ==
=== Football ===
- Alibeyköy SK
- Kartal S.K.
- Bayrampaşaspor
- Dostluk Spor Kulübü
- Fatih Karagümrük SK
- Feriköy SK
- Gaziosmanpaşaspor
- Küçükçekmece SK
- Küçükköyspor
- Maltepe Yalıspor
- Rumblers FC
- Taksim SK
- Tepecik B.S.
- Yenibosna Sports Club
- Zeytinburnuspor
- Alibeyköyspor
- Anadolu Üsküdar 1908
- Ataşehir Belediyespor
- Bakırköyspor
- Beykoz 1908
- Beylerbeyi S.K.
- Eyüpspor
- Güngören Belediyespor
- Istanbul Büyükşehir Belediyespor
- Istanbul Maltepespor
- Kartalspor
- Marmara Üniversitesi Spor
- Pendikspor
- Sarıyer G.K.
- Vefa S.K.

=== Ice hockey ===
- Istanbul Paten Kulübü

== Related lists ==
- List of museums and monuments in Istanbul
- List of urban centers in Istanbul
- List of universities in Istanbul
- List of schools in Istanbul
- List of architectural structures in Istanbul
- List of columns and towers in Istanbul
- List of libraries in Istanbul
- List of mayors of Istanbul
- List of Istanbulites
