= Untersteiner =

Untersteiner is a surname. Notable people with the surname include:

- Antonietta Gambara Untersteiner (1846–1896), Italian composer
- Norbert Untersteiner (1926–2012), professor
