= List of museums and monuments in Istanbul =

This list of museums and monuments in Istanbul, Turkey, includes the relevant architectural entities within Istanbul's city limits.

(in alphabetical order; Turkish-language name in parentheses where appropriate)

Castles and palaces

- Anadoluhisarı
- Beylerbeyi Palace
- Boukoleon Palace
- Dolmabahçe Palace
- Great Palace of Constantinople
- Küçüksu Pavilion
- Palace of the Porphyrogenitus (Tekfur Sarayı)
- Rumelihisarı
- Tekfur Palace (Tekfur Sarayı) (see Palace of the Porphyrogenitus)
- Topkapı Palace
- Yıldız Palace

Monuments

- Aviation Martyrs' Monument
- Column of Constantine (also known as the Burnt Column) (Çemberlitaş sütunu)
- Column of the Goths (Gotlar Sütunu)
- Column of Marcian (Kıztaşı, meaning "column of the girl")
- Milion, a mile-marker monument used for measuring the distances between the city (when known as Constantinople) and other cities of the Byzantine Empire (also known as the Eastern Roman Empire)
- Monument of Liberty
- Republic Monument
- Serpent Column

Museums

- Ahmet Hamdi Tanpınar Literature Museum Library
- Doğançay Museum, contemporary-art museum
- Galatasaray Museum
- Great Palace Mosaic Museum (Büyük Saray Mozaikleri Müzesi)
- Istanbul Archaeology Museums (İstanbul Arkeoloji Müzeleri)
- Istanbul Aviation Museum (İstanbul Havacılık Müzesi)
- Istanbul Military Museum (İstanbul Askeri Müze)
- Istanbul Modern Art Museum (İstanbul Modern Sanat Müzesi)
- Istanbul Naval Museum (İstanbul Deniz Müzesi)
- Istanbul Postal Museum (PTT İstanbul Müzesi)
- İstanbul State Art and Sculpture Museum (İstanbul Devlet Resim ve Heykel Müzesi)
- Istanbul Toy Museum (İstanbul Oyuncak Müzesi)
- Istanbul UFO Museum (İstanbul UFO Müzesi)
- Istanbul Cinema Museum (İstanbul Sinema Müzesi)
- Istanbul Zoology Museum
- Museum of the Ancient Orient (see Istanbul Archaeology Museums (İstanbul Arkeoloji Müzeleri))
- Museum of Classical Ottoman (Divan) Literature
- Museum of Illumination and Heating Appliances (Aydınlatma ve Isıtma Araçları Müzesi)
- The Museum of Innocence (Masumiyet Müzesi)
- Museum of Islamic Art (see Istanbul Archaeology Museums (İstanbul Arkeoloji Müzeleri))
- Panorama 1453 History Museum
- Pera Museum
- Proje4L / Elgiz Museum of Contemporary Art
- Rahmi M Koç Museum
- Rezan Has Museum
- Sadberk Hanım Museum
- Sakıp Sabancı Museum
- SALT
- SantralIstanbul (includes the SantralIstanbul Museum of Energy and a modern-art museum)
- TGC Press Media Museum (Basın Müzesi)
- Turkish and Islamic Arts Museum (Türk ve İslam Eserleri Müzesi)

Religious buildings

- Arap Mosque (Dominican Church of St. Paul)
- Blue Mosque (popular name for the Sultan Ahmed Mosque)
- Bodrum Mosque (Myrelaion)
- Bulgarian St. Stephen Church (also known as the Bulgarian Iron Church) (Sveti Stefan Kilisesi)
- Cathedral of the Holy Spirit (also known as the St. Esprit Cathedral)
- Chora Church (Kariye Müzesi, Kariye Camii or Kariye Kilisesi — the Chora Museum, Mosque or Church, respectively)
- Fatih Mosque
- Fenari Isa Mosque (Theotokos tou Libos)
- Fethiye Museum (see Pammakaristos Church)
- Hagia Irene (Aya İrini)
- Hagia Sophia
- Kalenderhane Mosque (Theotokos Kyriotissa)
- Kılıç Ali Pasha Complex
- Little Hagia Sophia (Ss. Sergius and Bacchus Church)
- Monastery of Stoudios
- Mosque of the Stablemaster (İmrahor Camii) (see Monastery of Stoudios)
- Ortaköy Mosque
- Pammakaristos Church
- Rüstem Pasha Mosque
- Sokollu Mehmet Pasha Mosque (Sokollu Pasa Camii)
- Süleymaniye Mosque
- Sultan Ahmed Mosque (popularly known as the Blue Mosque)
- Zeyrek Mosque (Church of Christos Pantokrator)

Others

- Galata Mevlevihanesi (Galata Convent of the Whirling Dervishes)
- Galata Tower
- The Gate of Galatasaray High School
- Hippodrome of Constantinople
- Walls of Constantinople
- Yedikule (Seven Towers) Castle

== Related lists ==
- List of architectural structures in Istanbul
- List of columns and towers in Istanbul
- List of Byzantine monuments in Istanbul
- List of Istanbulites
- List of libraries in Istanbul
- List of mayors of Istanbul
- List of schools in Istanbul
- List of urban centers in Istanbul
- List of universities in Istanbul
