= Rami Library =

Library in Istanbul, Turkey

Coordinates: 41°02′57″N 28°54′56″E

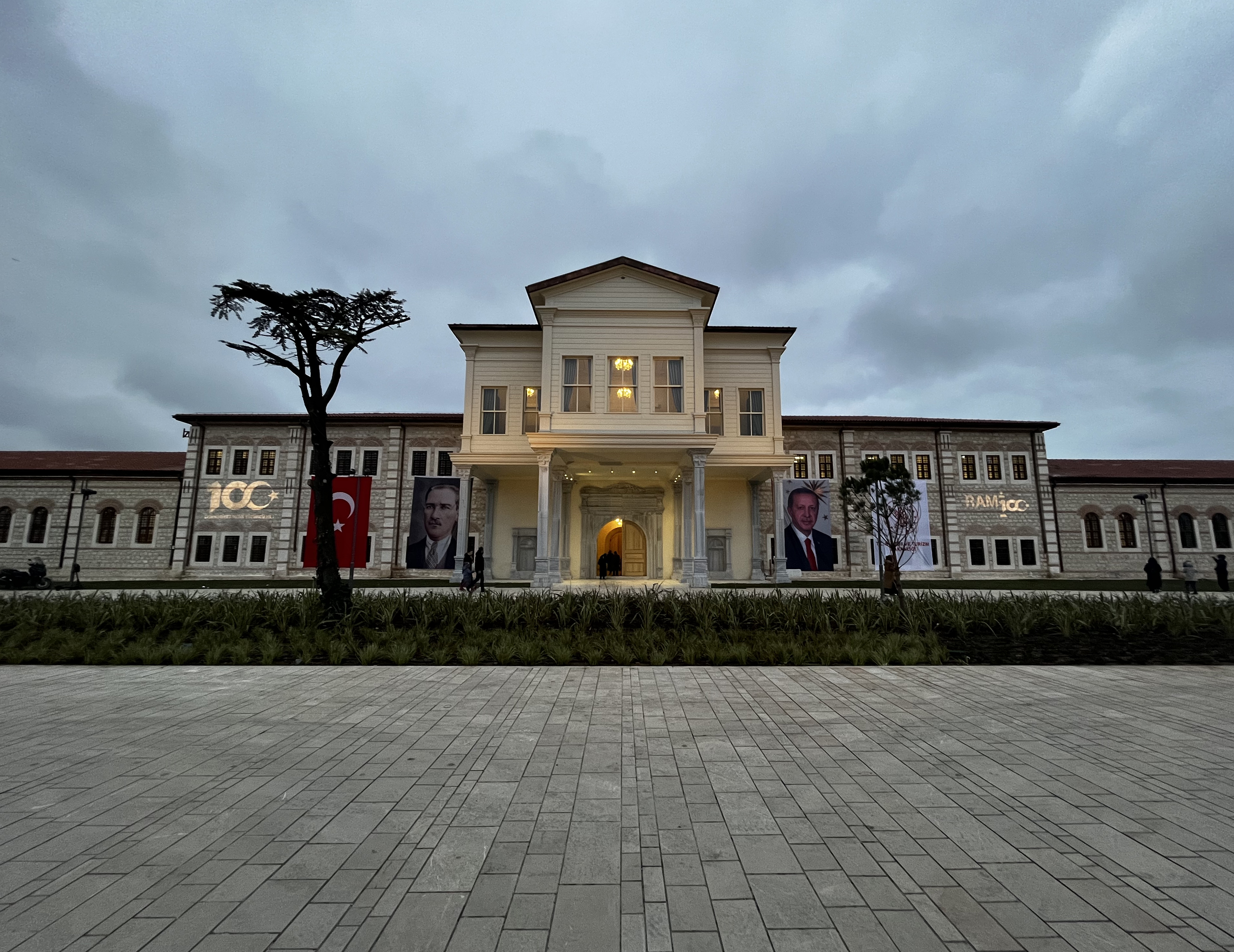
Library entrance

Rami Library (Turkish: Rami Kütüphanesi) is a public library established in 2023 housed in the redeveloped 18th-century Rami Barracks in Istanbul, Turkey.

== See also ==
- List of libraries in Istanbul
- Rami Barracks
