= Leonardo de Mango =

Italian painter (1843–1930)

Leonardo de Mango (19 February 1843 – 22 January 1930) was an Italian-born Ottoman Empire and later Turkish painter, active for most of his career in Istanbul. He was known for landscape paintings depicting Orientalist themes.

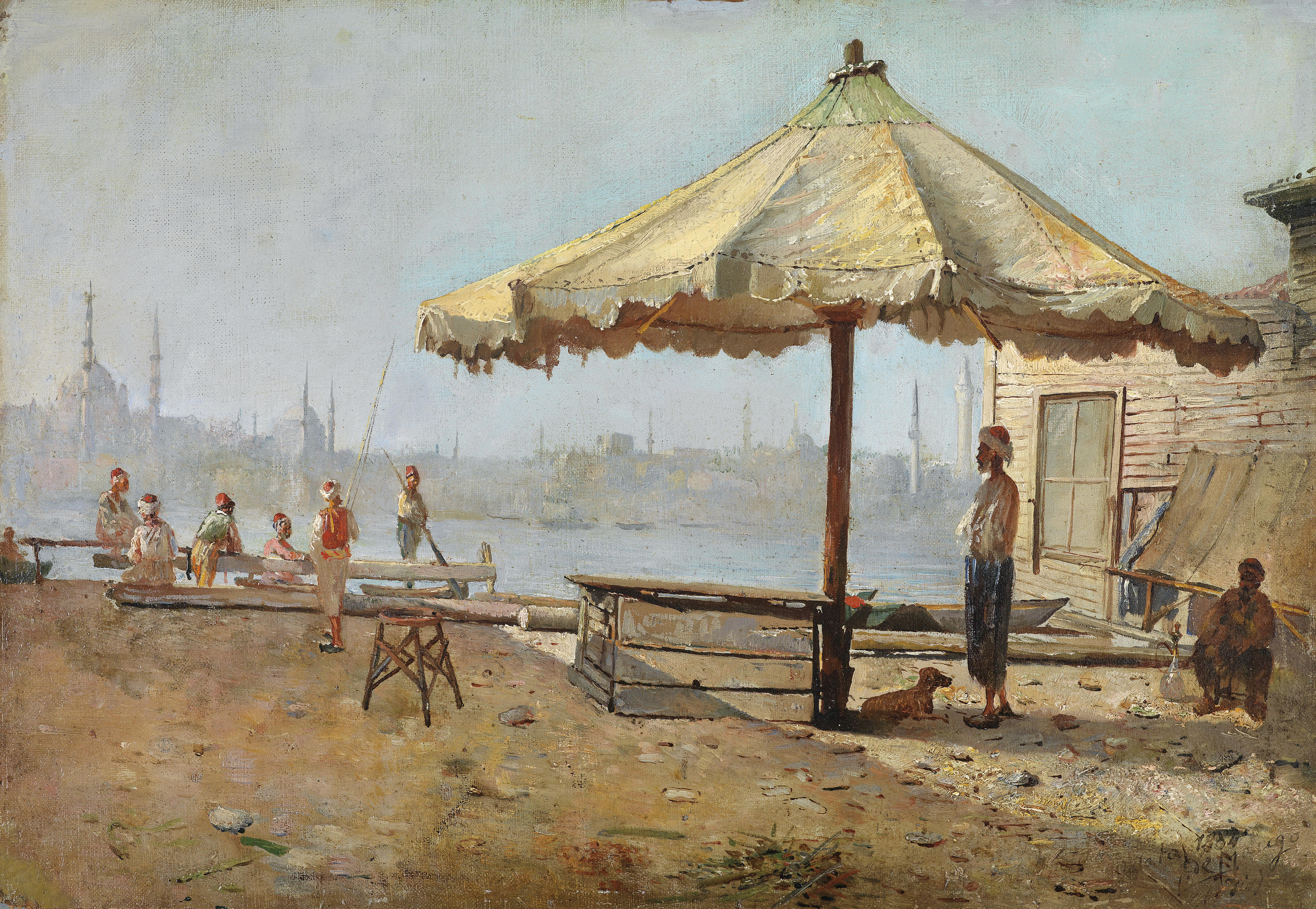
On the Golden Horn by de Mango, 1884

== Biography ==
The eldest child of a large family, de Mango was born in the town of Bisceglie near Bari in Italy, where he honed his native talent for drawing up to the age of nineteen.

In 1862, under the patronage of an aristocratic family of Bari, he entered the Academy of Fine Arts of Naples and studied there for eight years under Filippo Palizzi and Domenico Morelli. Morelli was a painter who treated exotic Orientalist themes. During this period de Mango also worked with Saverio Altamura, Bernardo Celentano, Raffaele d'Auria, Federico Maldarelli, Raffaele Postiglione and Giuseppe Mancinelli.

In 1883 de Mango settled in Istanbul during the reign of Sultan Abdul Hamid II, where he is known to have set up, and taught for some time at, the oil painting department of the School of Fine Arts. One of his students was Leone Minassian.

Forced to leave Istanbul briefly in 1911 during the Tripolitanian War, the artist returned to the city following the Treaty of Ouchy on 15 October 1912. De Mango was among the artists who, at the initiative of Alexander Vallaury, a teacher in the architecture department of the School of Fine Arts, and Regis Delbeuf, manager of the Istanbul daily Le Stamboul, organized the first painting and sculpture exhibition at Beyoğlu in 1901, dubbed the Pera Exhibitions in the Passage Oriental, an arcade owned by the French merchant Bourdon. With 27 works, de Mango was the best-represented artist in the exhibition, as he was again in the 1920 exhibition when, as one of 36 artists, he participated with 33 of his own paintings. De Mango also had 16 paintings in the last of the Pera exhibitions, which was held in 1903.

He painted in the open air and in his workshop at Beyoğlu, reflecting the daily life of the different districts of Istanbul until his death on 22 January 1930.

== Istanbul dreamscapes ==
De Mango conjured up idyllic scenes in the paintings he made at Fenerbahçe and Üsküdar on Istanbul's undulating coastline. The sparkling surface and unruffled calm of the sea and the trees along the shore enhance the dream-like atmosphere. Besides these scenes on the Marmara, the artist also depicted a large number of other spots in Istanbul including Büyükdere, Göksu (the Sweet Waters of Asia), the old Muslim quarter of Eyüp, the Greek district of Phanar, the Princes’ Islands, the Golden Horn, Seraglio Point and the Bosphorus. Despite his powerful use, especially, of color in his oil paintings, problems of perspective are nonetheless observable here and there.

A prolific artist, de Mango worked extensively in oil, watercolor, pencil and India ink. Not only did he continuously treat new subjects, he is also known, upon popular demand, to have reworked at his Beyoğlu atelier some of his earlier studies of Damascus, Beirut and Egypt from sketches at hand, selling most of them to his Levantine clients.

With the proclamation of the Republic on 29 October 1923 and the transfer of the seat of government to Ankara, artistic activities in Istanbul began to lose momentum as development focused on the new capital. During this formative period in the Turkish art of painting and its milieu, the artist was, therefore, far-removed from the new developments. Owing to advancing age, his activities were restricted to giving lessons in the mansions of the cosmopolitan circle in which he lived and moved, and holding one-man shows at the Italian-run ‘Societa Operaia’ and ‘Casa d’Italia’. He also made large-scale paintings of the saints commissioned by the city's several Italian churches.

== De Mango at Dolmabahçe Palace ==
Leading a solitary existence, de Mango was a man of supreme dignity and nobility and of a proud, stern nature. Through a regular correspondence with his brother Carlo de Mango back in Italy, he maintained close ties with his family and the city of his birth. In financial straits during the final years of the near half-century he spent in Istanbul, de Mango lived in a single room allocated to him by Marcello Campaner in the ‘Palazzetto dei Dragomani’ (Translators’ House) behind the Casa d’Italia. De Mango, who died at the age of eighty-eight, never married and nursed a perpetual longing for a family. Leonardo de Mango, is thought to have made some 1500 drawings and paintings, both oils and water colors, during his 47-year sojourn in Istanbul.
