= List of people from Constantinople =

This is a list of notable people from the city of Constantinople (present-day Istanbul) between the third century and 1453 CE. For a list of people born before the third century CE, see Notable people from Byzantium. For a list of people born after 1453, see List of people from Istanbul.

== List ==
- Saint Alexander (237/244–337)
- Saint Helena (c. 250–c. 330)
- Julian the Apostate (331–363), Byzantine emperor
- Hecebolius (Ἑκηβόλιος), sophist and rhetor
- Theodosius II (401–450)
- Proclus (412–485), Greek philosopher
- Zosimus (c. 490–c. 510), Byzantine historian
- Saint Arthelais (544–560)
- Maximus the Confessor (c. 580–662), Christian monk, theologian, scholar and saint
- Eudoxia Epiphania (b. 611), daughter of the Byzantine Emperor Heraclius
- Tarasios (c. 703–806), Patriarch of Constantinople and Christian saint
- Nikephoros I (c. 758–828), Patriarch of Constantinople
- Saint Theophanes the Confessor (758/760–817/818)
- Ignatius (c. 797–877), Patriarch of Constantinople
- Kassia (805/810–c. 867), Greek poet, composer and hymnographer
- Lazarus Zographos (d. 867), monk, painter and Christian saint
- Photios I (c. 820–893), Patriarch of Constantinople
- Nicholas Mystikos (852–925), Patriarch of Constantinople
- Alexander (c. 870–913), Byzantine emperor
- Constantine VII (905–959), Byzantine emperor and writer
- Michael I Cerularius (c. 1000–1059), Patriarch of Constantinople
- Michael Psellos (1017/1018–after 1078), Greek writer, philosopher, politician, and historian
- Alexios I Komnenos (1048–1118), Byzantine emperor
- Michael VII (1050–1090), Byzantine emperor
- Anna Komnene (1083–1153), Greek princess and scholar
- John II Komnenos (1087–1143), Byzantine emperor
- Eustathius (c. 1110–1198), archbishop of Thessalonica
- Isaac Komnenos (1093–1152), brother of Emperor John II Komnenos
- John Tzetzes (c. 1100–1180), Byzantine poet and grammarian
- Manuel I Komnenos (1118–1180), Byzantine emperor
- Isaac II Angelos (1156–1204), Byzantine emperor
- Theodore I Laskaris (1174–1221), Byzantine emperor
- Alexios II Komnenos (1169–1183), Byzantine emperor
- Maria Komnene (daughter of Manuel I) (1152–1182), daughter of the Emperor Manuel I Komnenos
- Nicephorus Blemmydes (1197–1272), Byzantine author
- Theodore Metochites (1207–1332), Greek statesman, author, gentleman philosopher, and patron of the arts
- George Acropolites (1217–1282), Greek historian and statesman
- Michael VIII Palaiologos (1223–1282), Byzantine emperor
- Andronikos II Palaiologos (1259–1332), Byzantine emperor
- John VI Kantakouzenos (c. 1292–1383), Byzantine emperor
- Gregory Palamas (1296–1359), Archbishop of Thessalonica
- Andronikos III Palaiologos (1297–1341), Byzantine emperor
- Simon Atumano, was the Bishop of Gerace in Calabria and was of Greco-Turkish origin.
- Manuel Chrysoloras (1355–1415), Greek scholar and grammarian
- Gennadius II Scholarius (c. 1400–1473), philosopher, Patriarch of Constantinople
- Saint Laura of Constantinople (c. 1400–1453), nun, abbess, saint
- Constantine XI (1405–1453), Byzantine emperor and saint
- John Argyropoulos (1415–1487), Greek lecturer, philosopher and humanist
- Constantine Lascaris (1434–1501), Greek scholar and grammarian

== See also ==
- Constantinople
- Istanbul
- Byzantium
