= Miniatürk =

Miniature park in Istanbul, Turkey

Coordinates: 41°03′36″N 28°56′55″E

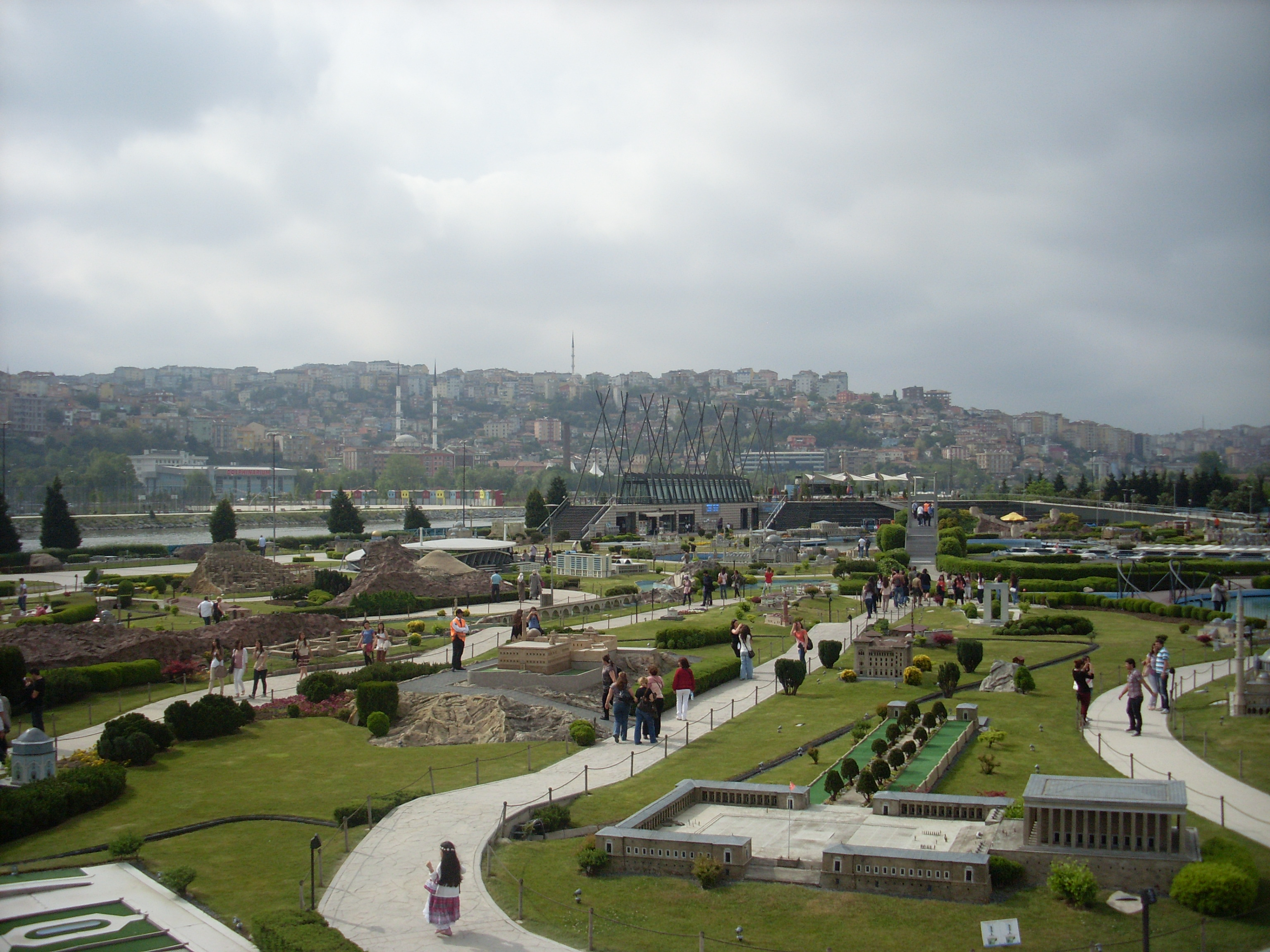
- An overview of Miniatürk, 2012
- Interactive map of Miniatürk
- Type: Miniature park
- Location: Istanbul, Turkey
- Area: 60,000 m^{2} (650,000 sq ft)
- Opening: 2 May 2003
- Visitors: 5 million (2015)

Miniatürk is a miniature park at the northeastern shore of Golden Horn in Istanbul, Turkey. It was opened on 2 May 2003. It is one of the world's largest miniature parks, with a 15,000 m^{2} (160,000 sq ft) model area and total area of 60,000 square metres (650,000 sq ft). It contains 135 models, in 1:25 scale, of structures from in and around Turkey, and interpretations of historic structures.

Of the park's total area, 40,000 m^{2} (430,000 sq ft) is open space; 3,500 m^{2} (38,000 sq ft) is covered; and 2,000 m^{2} (22,000 sq ft) contain pools and waterways. Its parking lot has a capacity of 300 vehicles.

60 of the park's structures are from Istanbul, 63 are from Anatolia, and 13 are from the Ottoman territories that today lie outside Turkey. Also featured are historic structures like the Temple of Artemis at Ephesus, and the Mausoleum of Maussollos at Halicarnassus (now Bodrum). Additional space is reserved for future models.

== Gallery ==
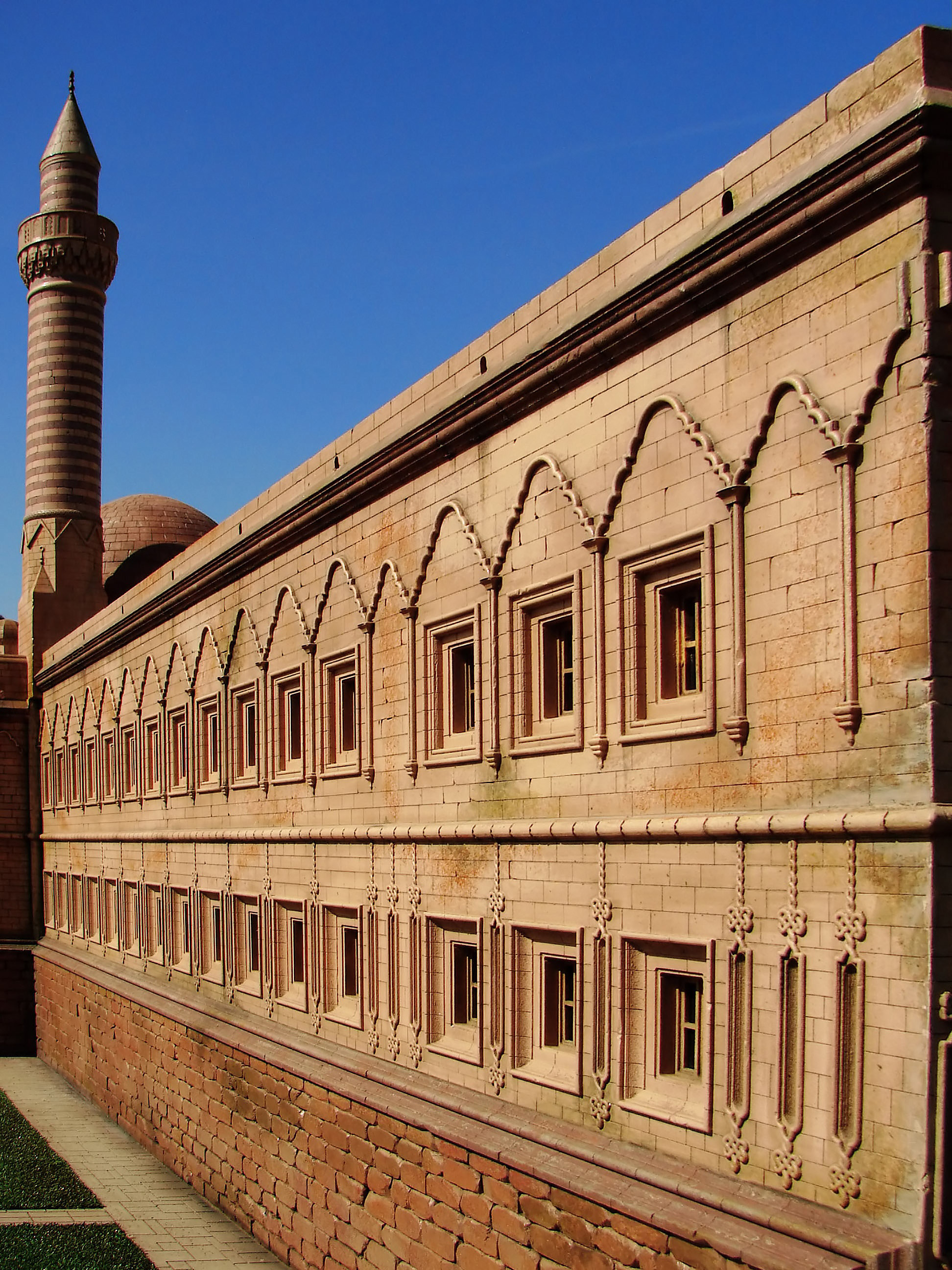
Medrese

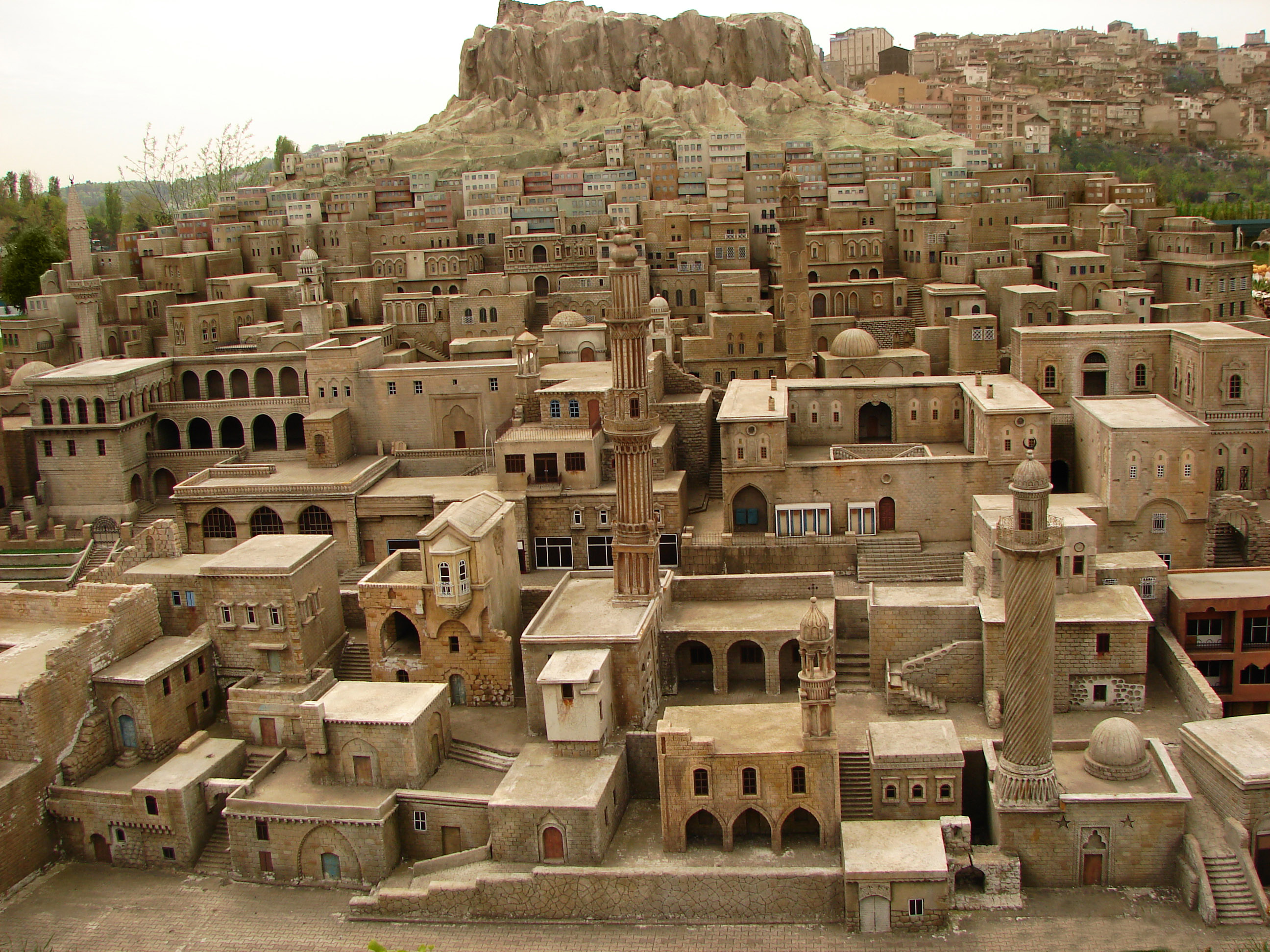
Mardin stone houses

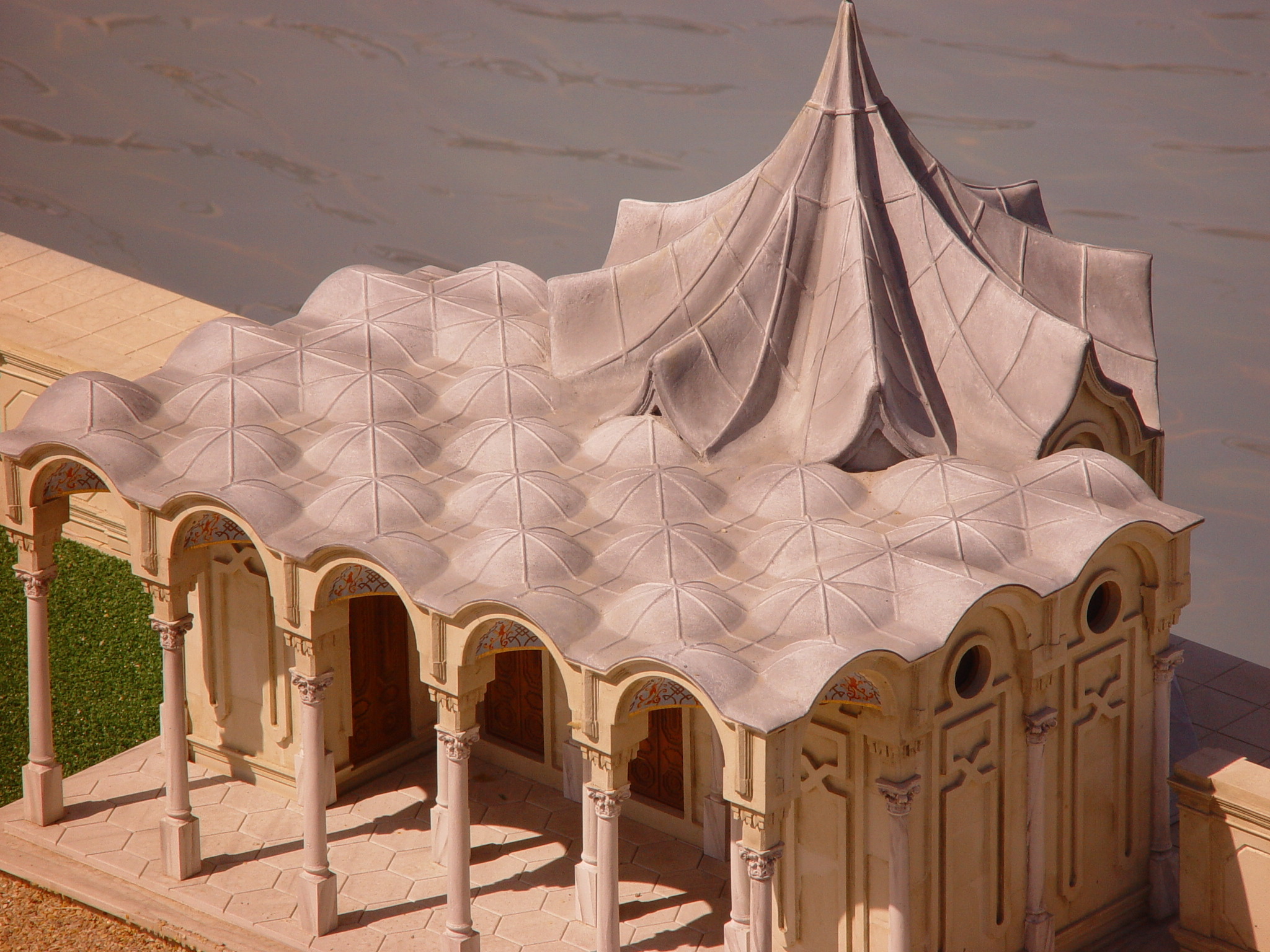
Bathing Pavilion of Beylerbeyi Palace

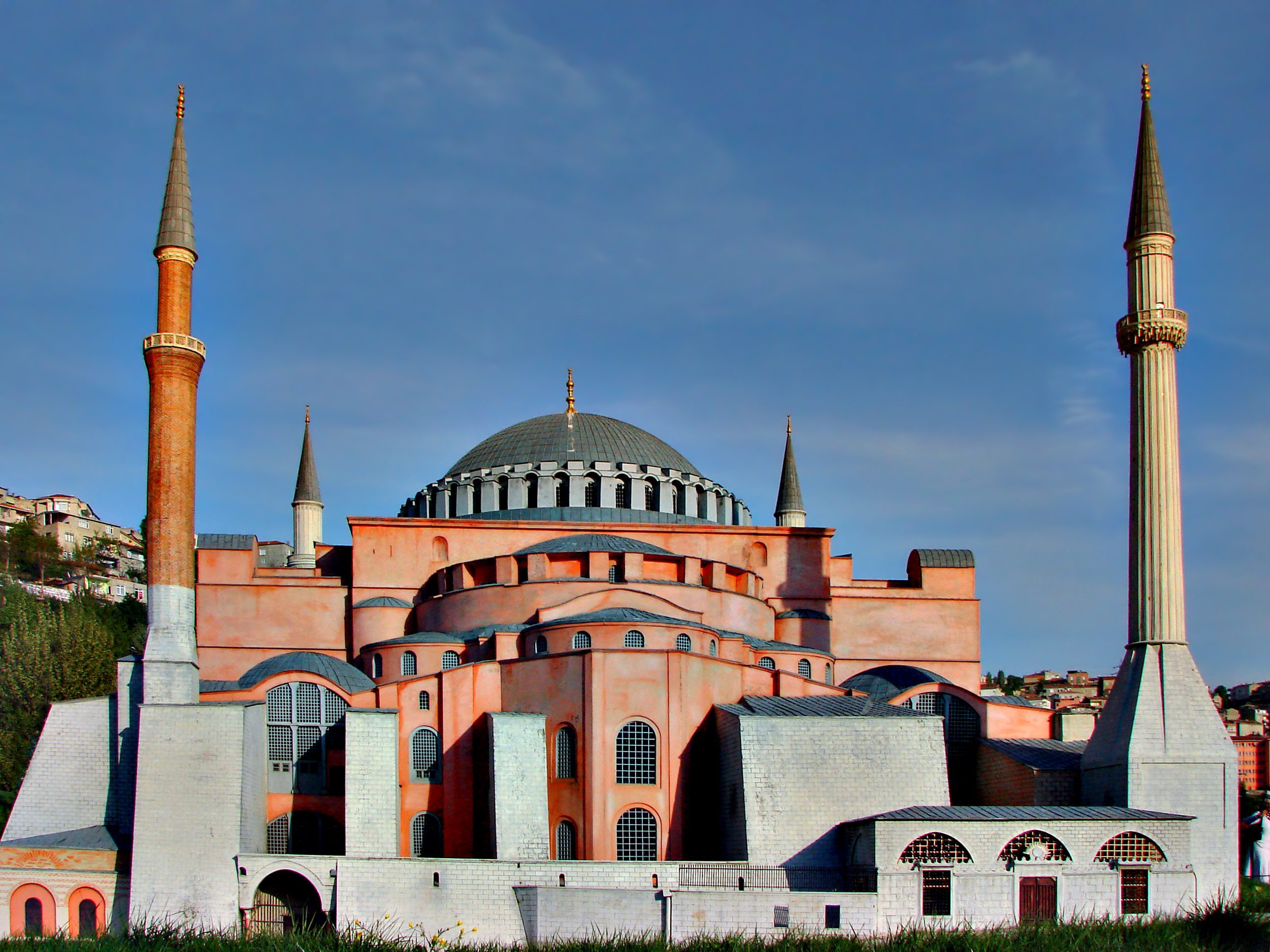
Hagia Sophia

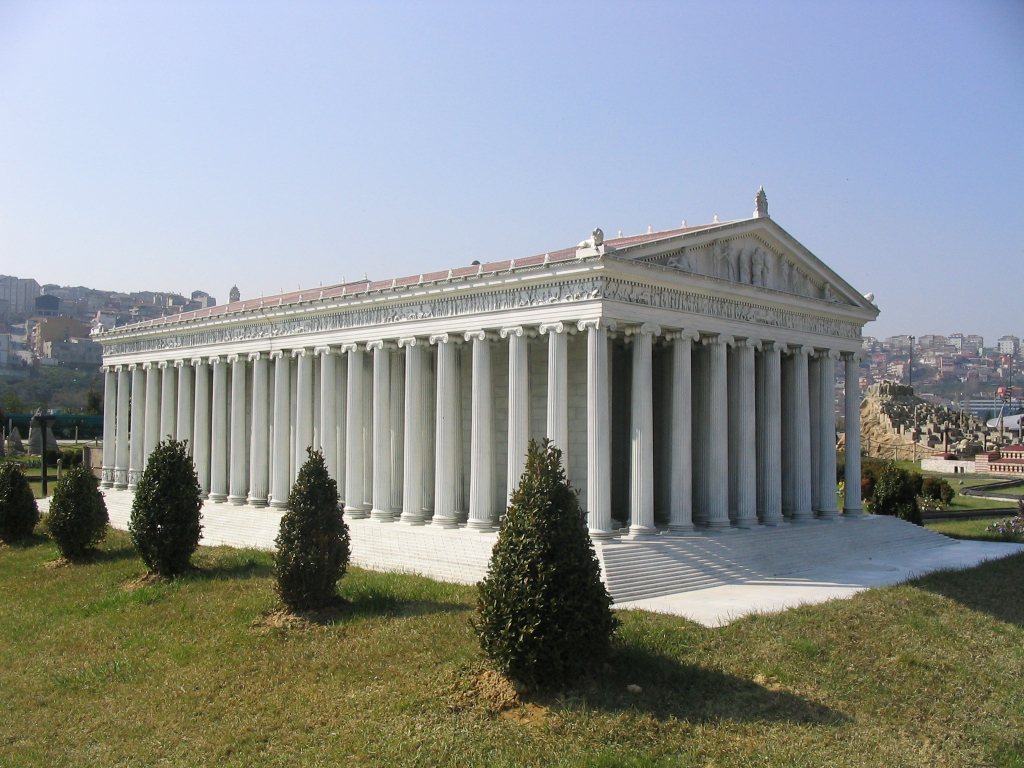
Temple of Artemis

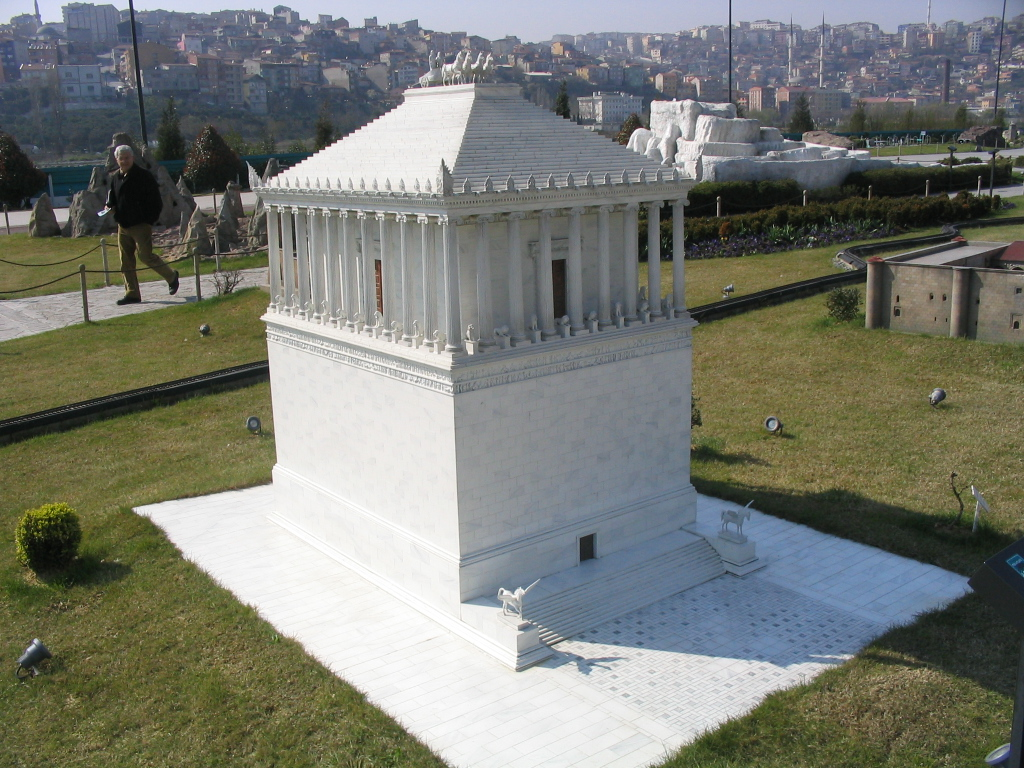
Mausoleum of Mausolus

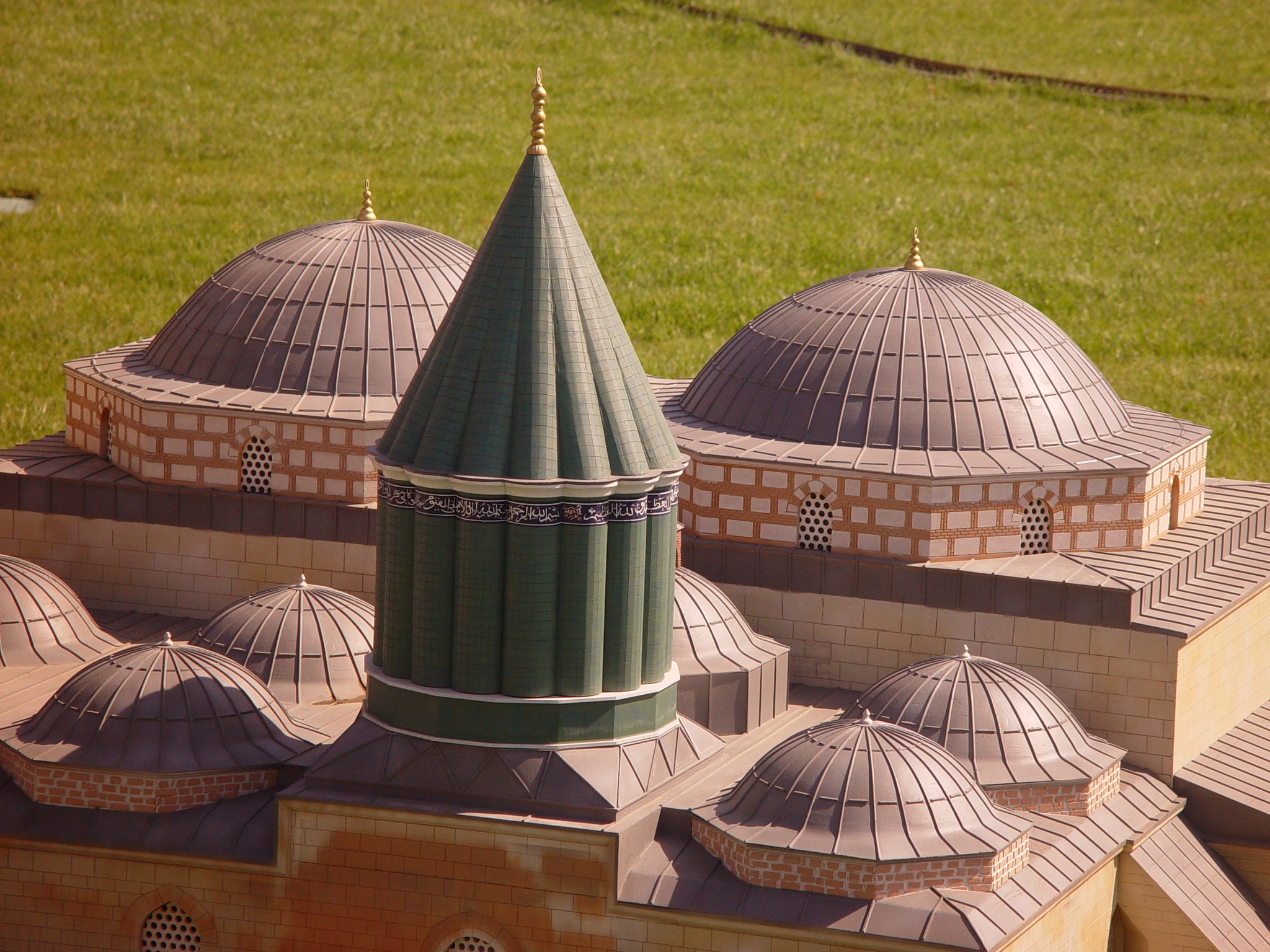
Mevlana Museum

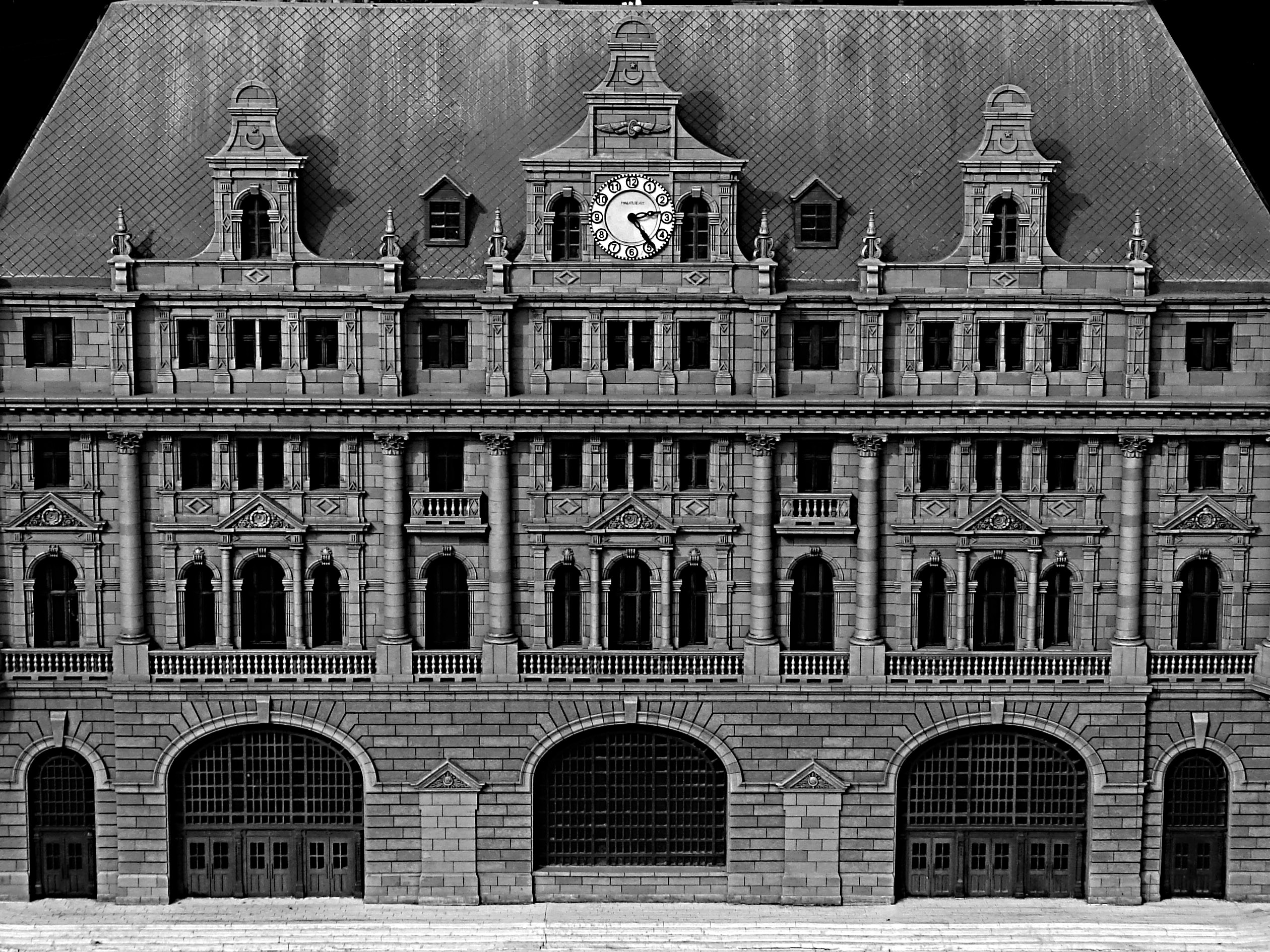
Haydarpaşa Terminal

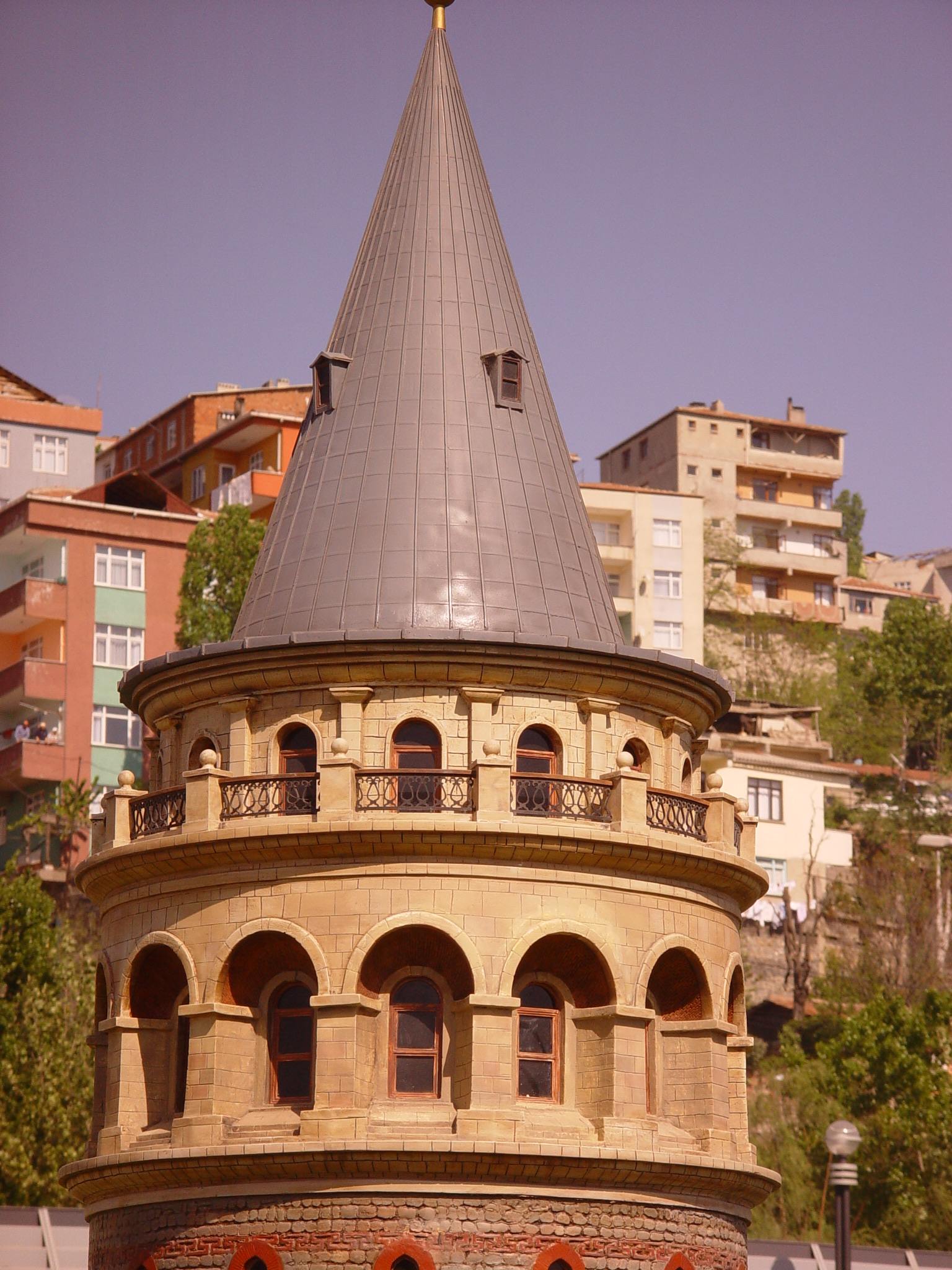
Galata Tower

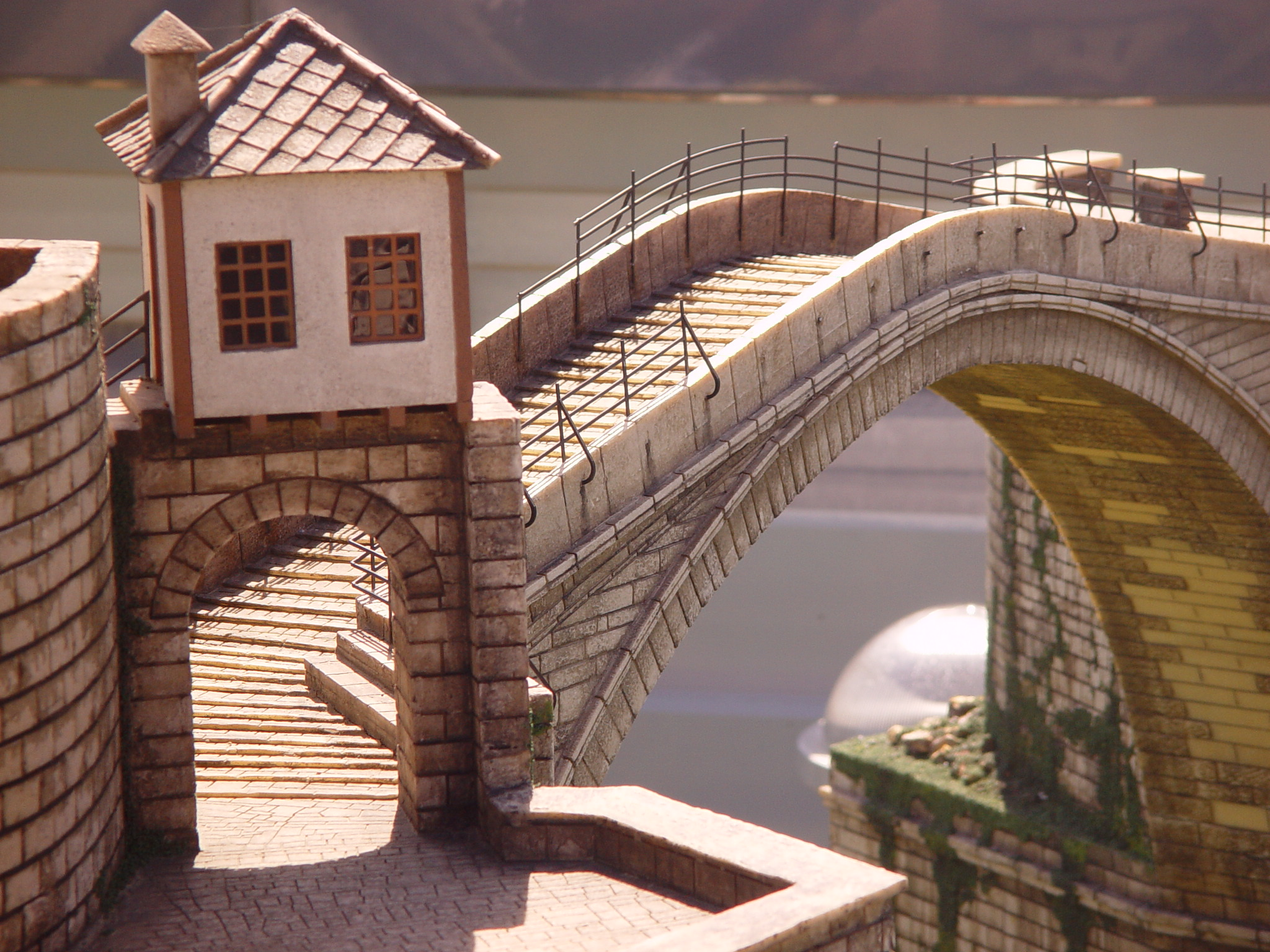
Mostar

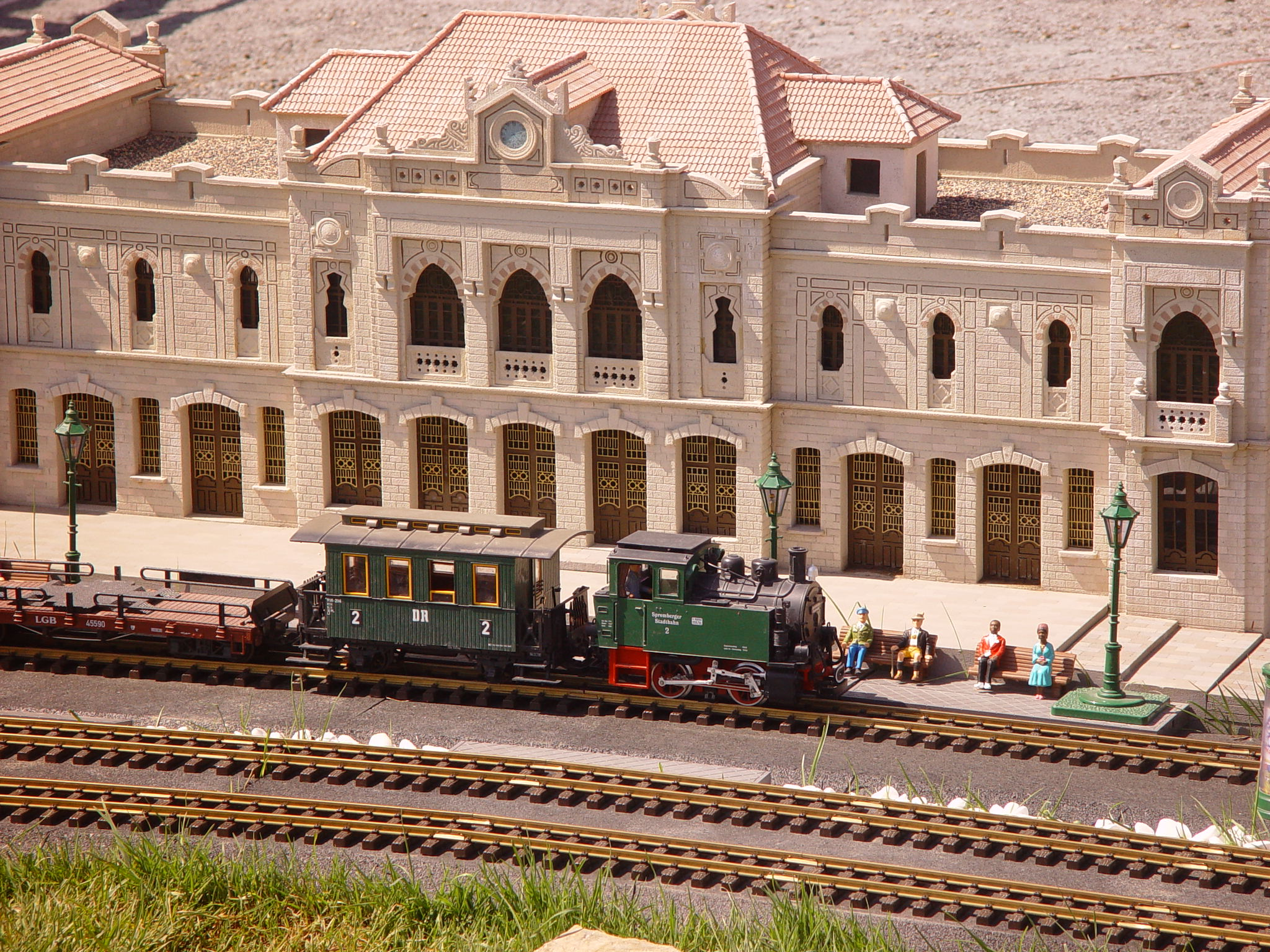
Damascus Station

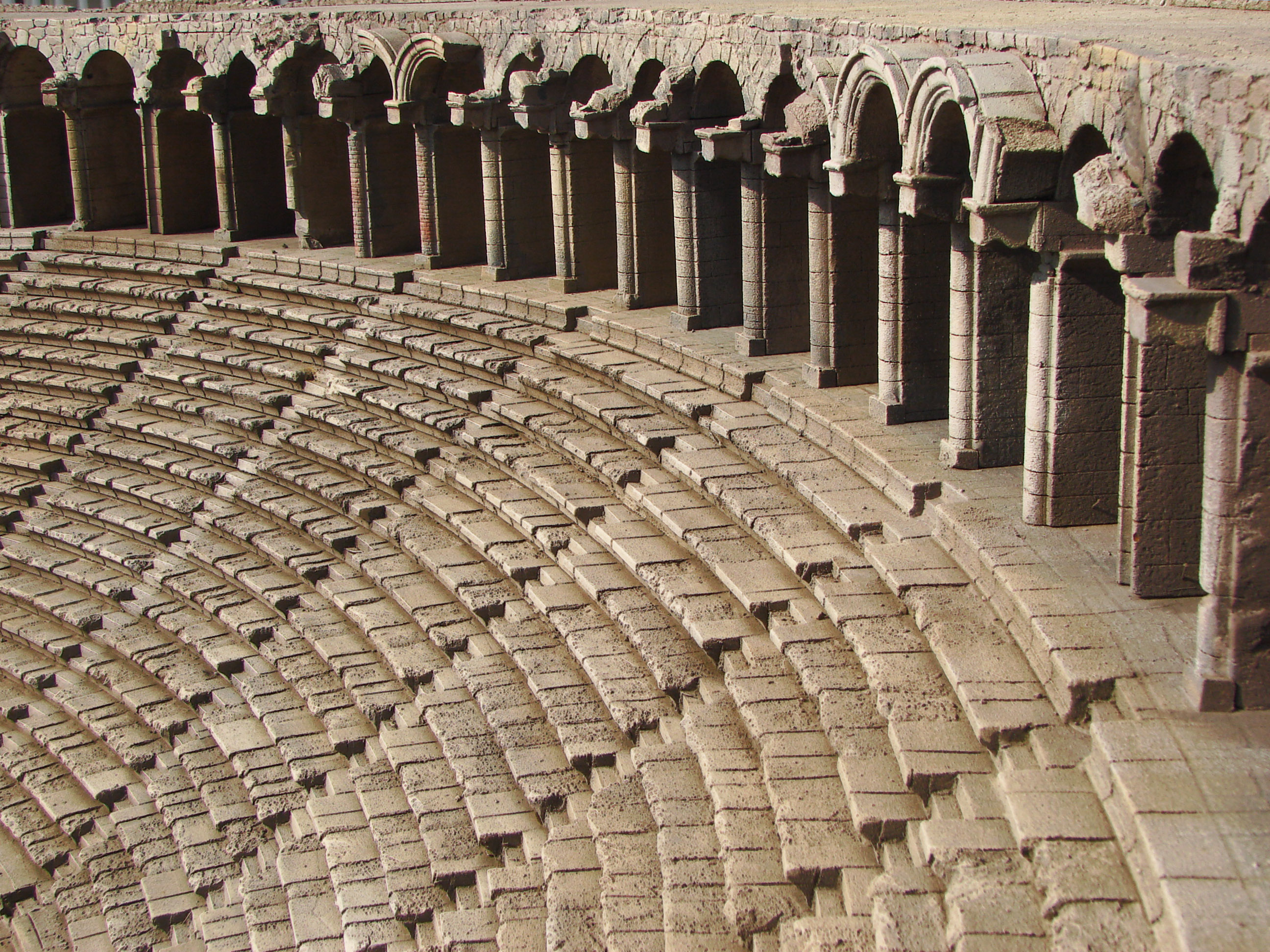
Aspendos
