= Sadettin Pasha =

- Born: c. 1851; İstanbul
- Died: End of 1908; İstanbul

Sadettin Pasha (Turkish: Sadettin Paşa; c. 1851–1908) was an Ottoman pasha and Defterdarlı Sukru Mehmet Efendi's son. He was assigned to suppress the Herzegovina rebellion in 1875. Sadettin Pasha was in charge of the Ottoman troops during the Van Revolt of 1896.
