= List of libraries in Istanbul =

This is a list of libraries within the city limits of Istanbul.

Some of the most important libraries are:

- American Library (Amerikan Kütüphanesi), Tepebaşı
- Atatürk Library, Taksim, Beyoğlu
- Beyazıt State Library, Beyazıt, Fatih
- Halide Edip Adıvar Library (Üsküdar American Academy), Bağlarbaşı
- Istanbul Celik Gulersoy Library (Çelik Gülersoy Kütüphanesi), Sultanahmet
- Istanbul Technical University Mustafa Inan Library
- İBB Bulgur Palas Library, Aksaray, Fatih
- Köprülü Library
- Library of the Archaeological Museum (Arkeoloji Müzesi Kütüphanesi), Sultanahmet
- Library of the French Institute, Beyoğlu
- Library of the Goethe Institute, Beyoğlu
- Library of the Islamic Research Center, ISAM (İslam Araştırmaları Merkezi), at Mayıs Üniversitesi in Bağlarbaşı
- Library of the Topkapı Palace (Topkapı Sarayı Kütüphanesi), Sultanahmet
- Library of Women's Works (Kadin Eserleri Kütüphanesi), Haliç
- Nuruosmaniye Library, Eminönü
- Rami Library (Rami Kütüphanesi), 2023-established library housed in the 18th-century built Rami Barracks.
- Süleymaniye Library (Süleymaniye Kütüphanesi), Beyazıt

== See also ==
- List of libraries in Turkey
- List of museums and monuments in Istanbul
- List of urban centers in Istanbul
- List of universities in Istanbul
- List of schools in Istanbul
- List of architectural structures in Istanbul
