= Museum of Illumination and Heating Appliances =

Privately run museum in Istanbul, Turkey

The Museum of Illumination and Heating Appliances (Turkish: Aydınlatma ve Isıtma Araçları Müzesi) is a small, privately run museum adjacent to the Blue Mosque and Hagia Sophia in the Sultanahhmet neighbourhood of Eminönü in Istanbul, Turkey.

Located in a restored 19th-century mansion, the museum houses a large collection of antique and archaic heating and lighting appliances, as well as a variety of other Anatolian artifacts. The museum's pamphlet sums up its collection as:

Almost 90 percent of the items presented have been collected in Anatolia, while the remaining are from various parts of the world. Among these are

- stone lamps (40,000 years old),
- quick flammable plants (with the spark of two flint stones),
- oil lamps made of clay (15,000 years old),
- metal items 9,000 years old,
- glass 4,5000 years old,
- the discovery of steam energy,
- oil lamps from the Seljuk era,
- a porcelain oil lamp similar to the one at Louvre,
- cooking stoves,
- candle sticks from various countries and religions,
- kerosene lamps,
- Beykoz oil lamps,
- coal stoves and irons,
- Seljuk braziers,
- Ottoman incense burners,
- city gas lamps,
- stoves
- chandeliers, oil lamps, spirit lamps, acetylene lamps, Byzantine and Roman oil lamps,
- lanterns from different eras and places, and
- hundreds of amazing items for illumination and heating.

All are displayed in historical sequence, starting from the discovery of fire one million years ago.

For foreign visitors interested in Ottoman culture and society, the collection of room heaters and similar appliances gives a window into the lifestyle of Istanbul's golden age.
