= Gönül Engin Yılmaz =

Turkish artist

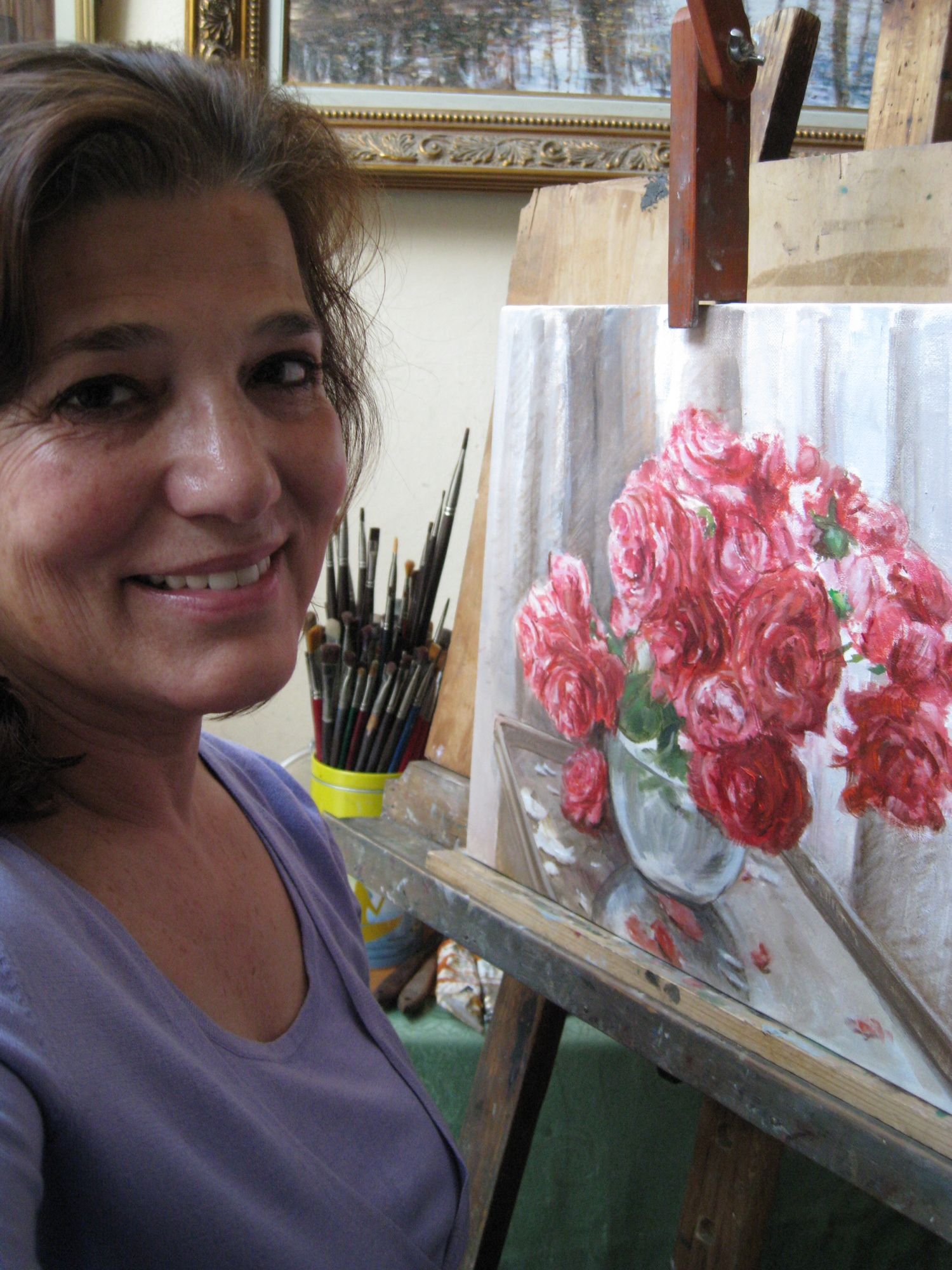
- Born: Gönül Engin Yılmaz; 23 June 1949 (age 77); Istanbul, Turkey
- Known for: Art, oil painting

Gönül Engin Yılmaz is a Turkish artist, focused on landscapes, still lifes, floral and portraits.

== Biography ==
She was born on 23 June 1949, in Istanbul, Turkey. She is a graduate of Robert College (ACG) and the Technical University of Istanbul.

She lives in Istanbul, where she has been working as a professional tour guide.

Gönül Engin Yılmaz has participated in many exhibitions and one-man shows in the US and Turkey. Many of her paintings are held in private collections.

== Gallery ==
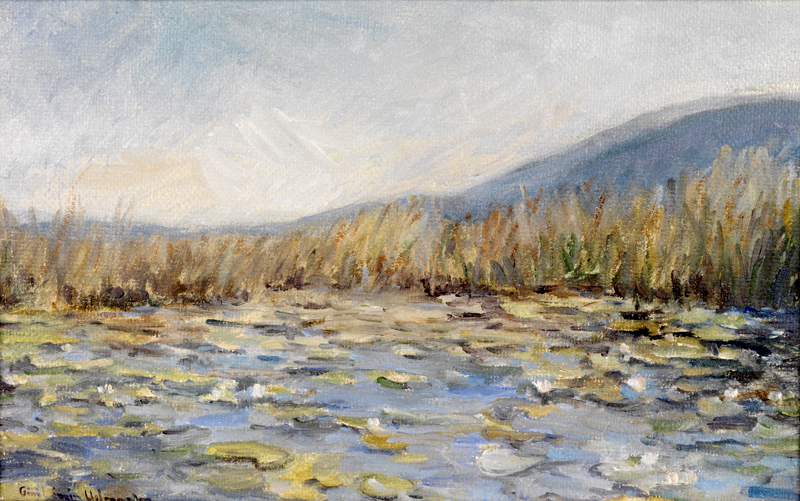
Water Lilies in the lake

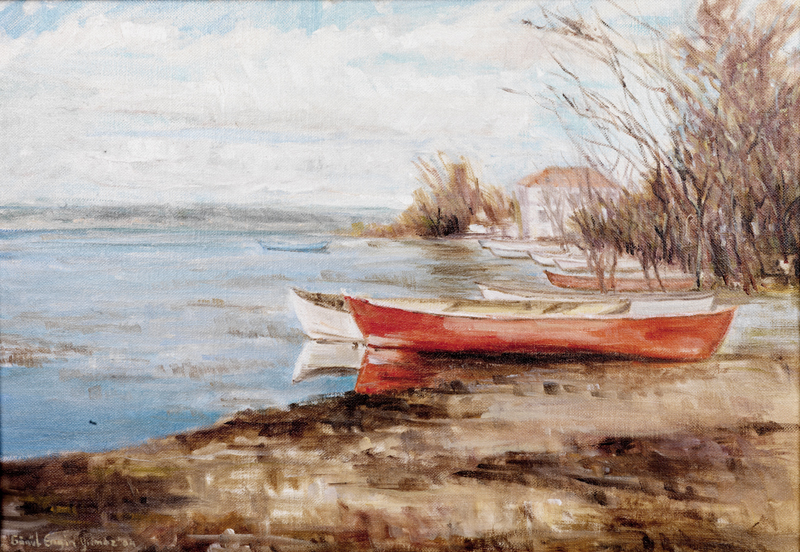
Boats in the lake

== External ==
- www.gonulenginyilmaz.com
  - https://www.youtube.com/watch?v=vo61FBiA9Oo
