= Volkan Diyaroğlu =

Turkish artist

Volkan Diyaroglu is a Turkish artist. He was born in Istanbul, Turkey, on May 1, 1982. His work includes painting, collage, paper, light and installation works.

== Education ==
Before he started studying at the Fine Arts Faculty of Mimar Sinan University in Istanbul, he worked in the studios of Turkish painters and artists. In 2002–2003 he began to wash his paintings and to paint using cars. After being awarded the Promoe scholarship he continued his education at Facultad de Bellas Artes de San Carlos de Valencia. Volkan was the first fine arts student from Turkey to be granted this scholarship.

== Career ==
In 2003, at the age of 20, he participated in the VIII Istanbul Biennale in collaboration with Galeri Binyil and presented a parallel project. In 2004 Volkan exhibited in Sala Naranja in Valencia. At that time Sala Naranja was one of Spain's most important alternative exhibition spaces. In the following years Volkan collaborated with Sala Naranja on many projects.

In 2005, his paintings were exhibited in the VI Observatori Festival in the Principe Felipe Museum in Ciudad de las Artes y Ciencias of Valencia, together with artists like Gary Hill, Gordon Matta-Clark, Paul McCarthy, Dennis Oppenheim and others. In 2006 he was invited to Paris, France, to prepare an exhibition in Abbaye de Maubuisson. In 2007 he presented an exhibition called “Decalages”, as part of the Tram Project. The exhibition was held at Abbaye de Maubuisson. The same year Volkan's biggest exhibition was set up by Sala Naranja in Forja Arte Contemporaneo in Valencia. Shortly after that he was awarded an Cite International des Arts Scholarship in Paris, France.

In 2008 he won the Spanish XXXV Bancaja Painting, Sculpture and Digital Art Prize. He exhibited in IVAM Museum. He was elected 3 times as one of the top ten artists of Saatchi Gallery. In 2009 his work was presented at the Saatchi Gallery in Dubai. The same year Volkan represented Turkey at an event called Turkish Culture Season in France. In 2011 he was included in Sotheby's Contemporary Turkish Art Auction in London, UK.

By 2013 his work had been presented at 15 individual exhibitions, his shows had been held in 8 museums, in 10 different countries, and he had been awarded 6 scholarships. His works were auctioned at five different auction houses. Volkan's paintings are in many private, gallery, foundation and corporate collections.
