= Leone Minassian =

Armenian-Italian painter (1905–1978)

- Լևոն Մինասյան
- Born: Levon Zaki Minasyan; May 8, 1905; Constantinople, Ottoman Empire
- Died: 1978; Venice, Veneto, Italy
- Other names: Levon Minasyan
- Education: Accademia di Belle Arti di Venezia
- Mother: Iskouhi Minas

Leone Minassian (1905–1978; Armenian: Լևոն Մինասյան, romanized: Levon Minasyan) was an Ottoman Empire-born Italian painter and printmaker, of Armenian descent. His work is an important representative of European post-war abstract painting. Minassian lived in Venice for more than 40 years.

== Early life and education ==
Leone Minassian was born on May 8, 1905, in Constantinople, Ottoman Empire to Armenian parents. His mother was writer Iskouhi Minas, and his father was Zhan Minasyan, the editor of the French periodical "Patri". He started painting in this youth.

Minassian has been attributed to studying art at Accademia di Belle Arti di Venezia, as well as under many notable artists, including Leonardo De Mango; Albert Mille (1882–1946); in Naples under Danish painter Axerl Jarl; and in Venice under Italian painter Alessandro Milesi.

== Career ==
Minassian's early art was influenced by futurism, surrealism, and the art of Giorgio De Chirico. He was friends with artists Alberto Viani, Giuseppe Santomaso, Giorgio Morandi, and Jean Arp.

After World War II, Minassian found his own painterly language and his art began to receive international attention. His pictures are characterized by intertwined, plant-like shapes and/or bodies in diverse colors. He took part in the group exhibitions II. documenta in Kassel in 1959, and the Venice Biennale in 1961. His work can be found in the art museum Ca' Pesaro in room 7.
