= Iskouhi Minas =

French writer

Iskouhi Minas (Armenian: Իսկուհի Մինաս; 2 October 1884 – 7 September 1951) also known as Iskuhi Minas, and Iskouhi Minasyan, was a French novelist and poet.

== Biography ==
Iskouhi Minas was born on 2 October 1884, in Constantinople, Ottoman Empire (present-day Istanbul, Turkey). She studied at K. Polis and Kertz schools in Italy. Minas married Zhan Minasyan, the editor of the French periodical "Patri", together they had son Leone Minassian.

She spoke French, Italian, and Latin languages. Minas wrote only in French, and was published by the French press; however many of her books were later translated to Armenian by Daniel Varoujan, Krikor Zohrab, and Zabel Yesayan and published by the Armenian press. The Minas book "Aprel" (1930) depicts the life of writer Krikor Zohrab.

Minas died on 7 September 1951 in Paris.

== Publications ==
- "Riding", 1913
- "Inward Hours", 1914
- "Pearls of Venice", 1914
- "Novels and Tales", 1918, Paris
- "Night Voices", 1925
- "Antique flowers", 1925
- "The Italian lampshade", 1928.
- "Whatever Dies", novel, 1928
- "Live", 1930
- "Proud Tribes", 1933
