= List of urban centers in Istanbul =

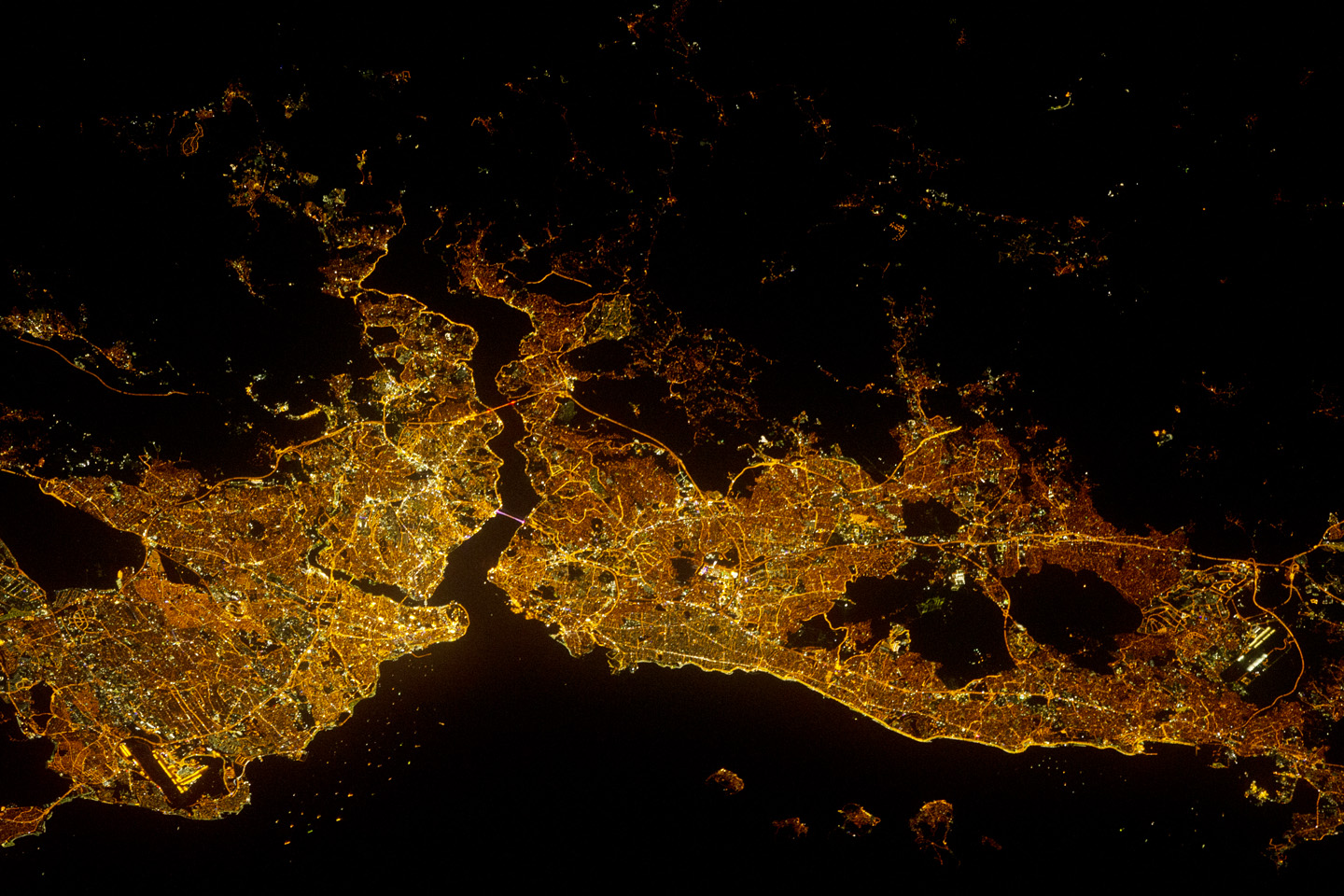
Aerial view of the Istanbul metropolitan area at night

The Hagia Sophia in Fatih, Istanbul's historic center

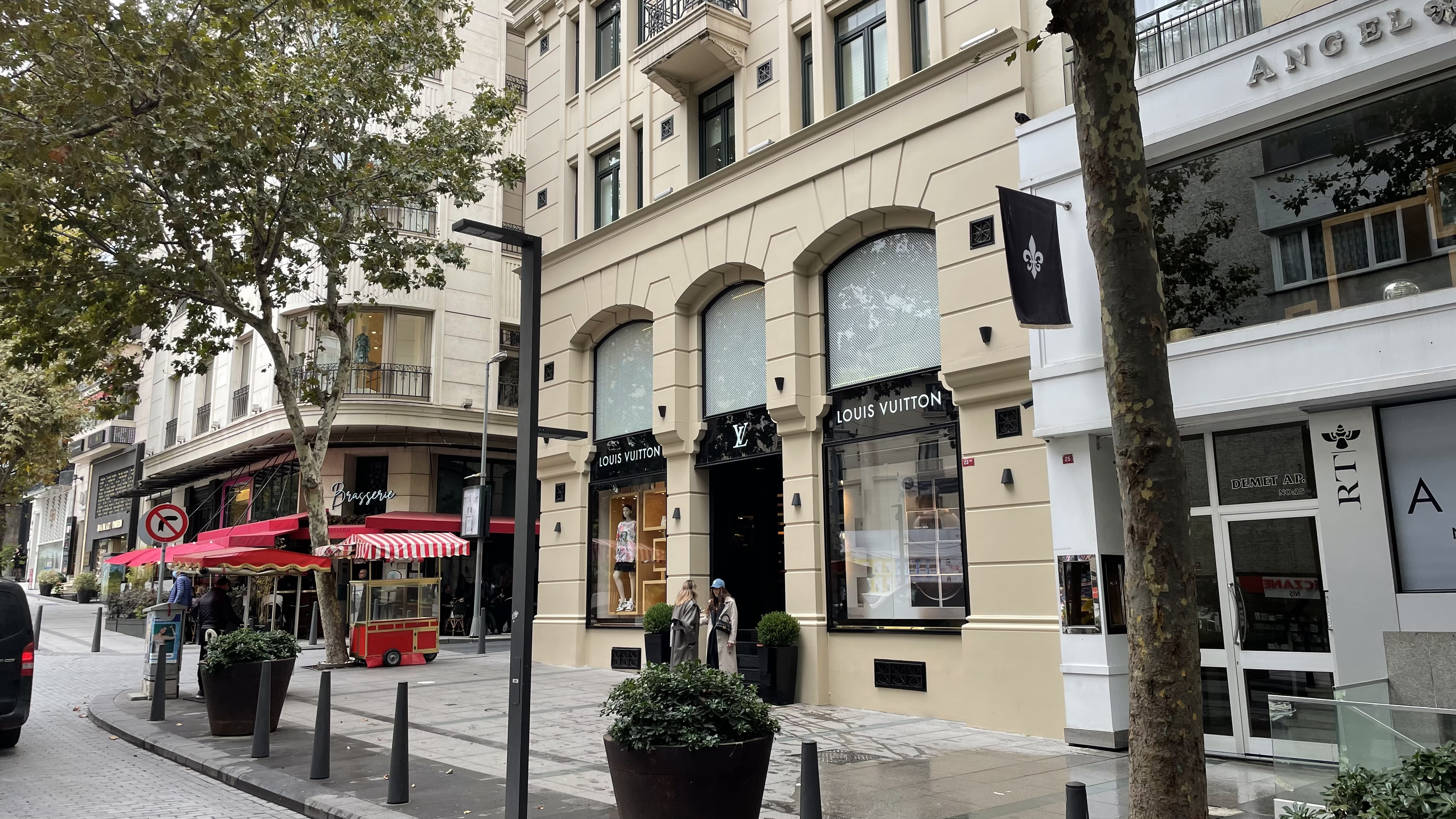
Nişantaşı shopping district in Istanbul

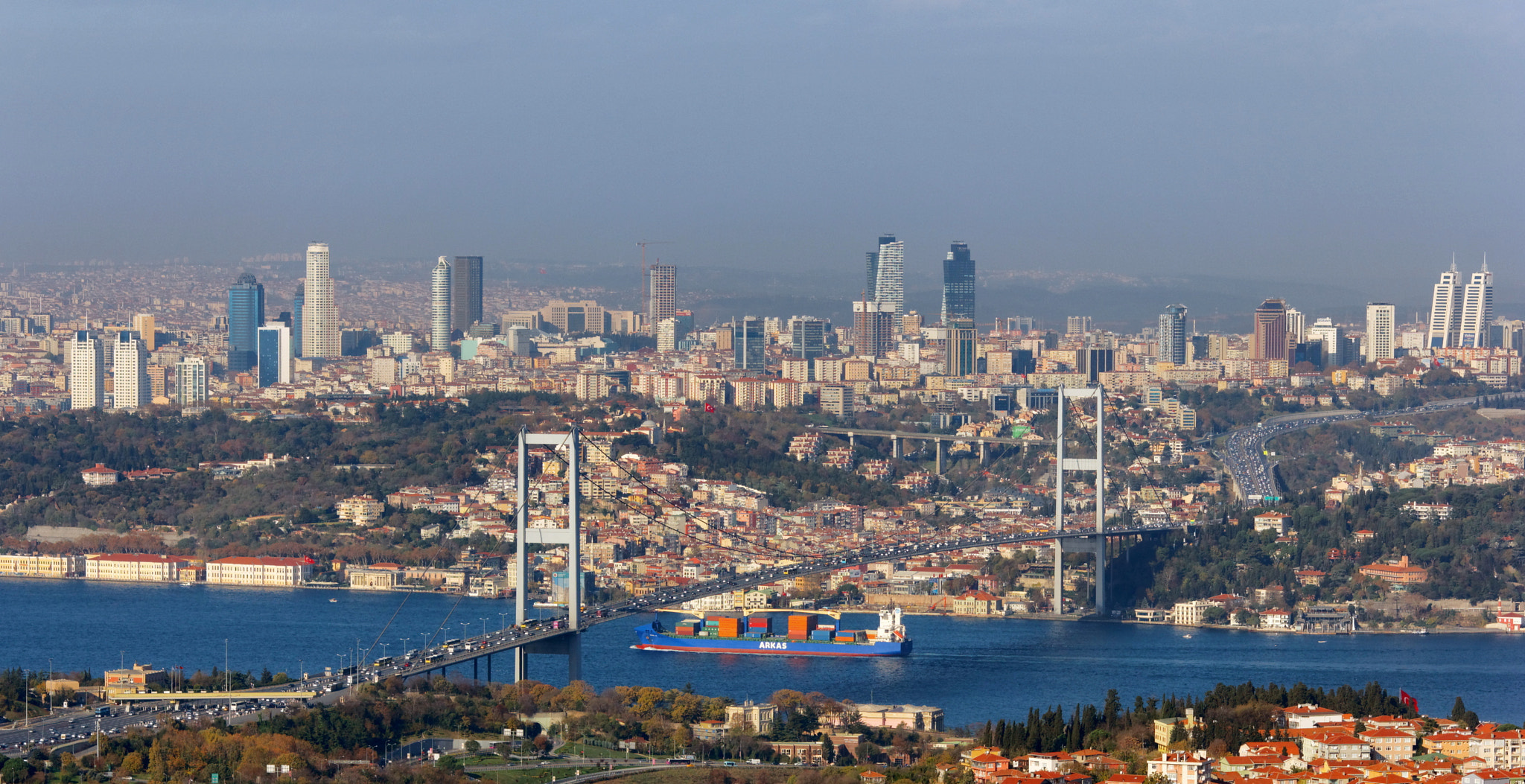
Bosphorus Bridge and skyline of the Istanbul Central Business District

The list of urban centers in Istanbul lists the major clusters of retail, office, government, retail and dense residential buildings within the city limits of Istanbul, including areas of the historic city center, Fatih, as well as edge cities built outside the historic core.

Important "edge cities", i.e. corridors and nodes of business and shopping centers and of tall residential buildings, include the Istanbul Central Business District in and around Şisli; the E-5/D-100 highway corridor along the north side of the old airport, and on the Asian side, Kozyatağı–Ataşehir, Altunizade, Kavacik and Ümraniye.

== European side ==
=== Historic city center areas ===
==== Fatih ====
- Eminönü
- The Grand Bazaar
- The Spice Bazaar
- Sultanahmet
- Yedikule

==== Beyoğlu district (historic Pera) ====
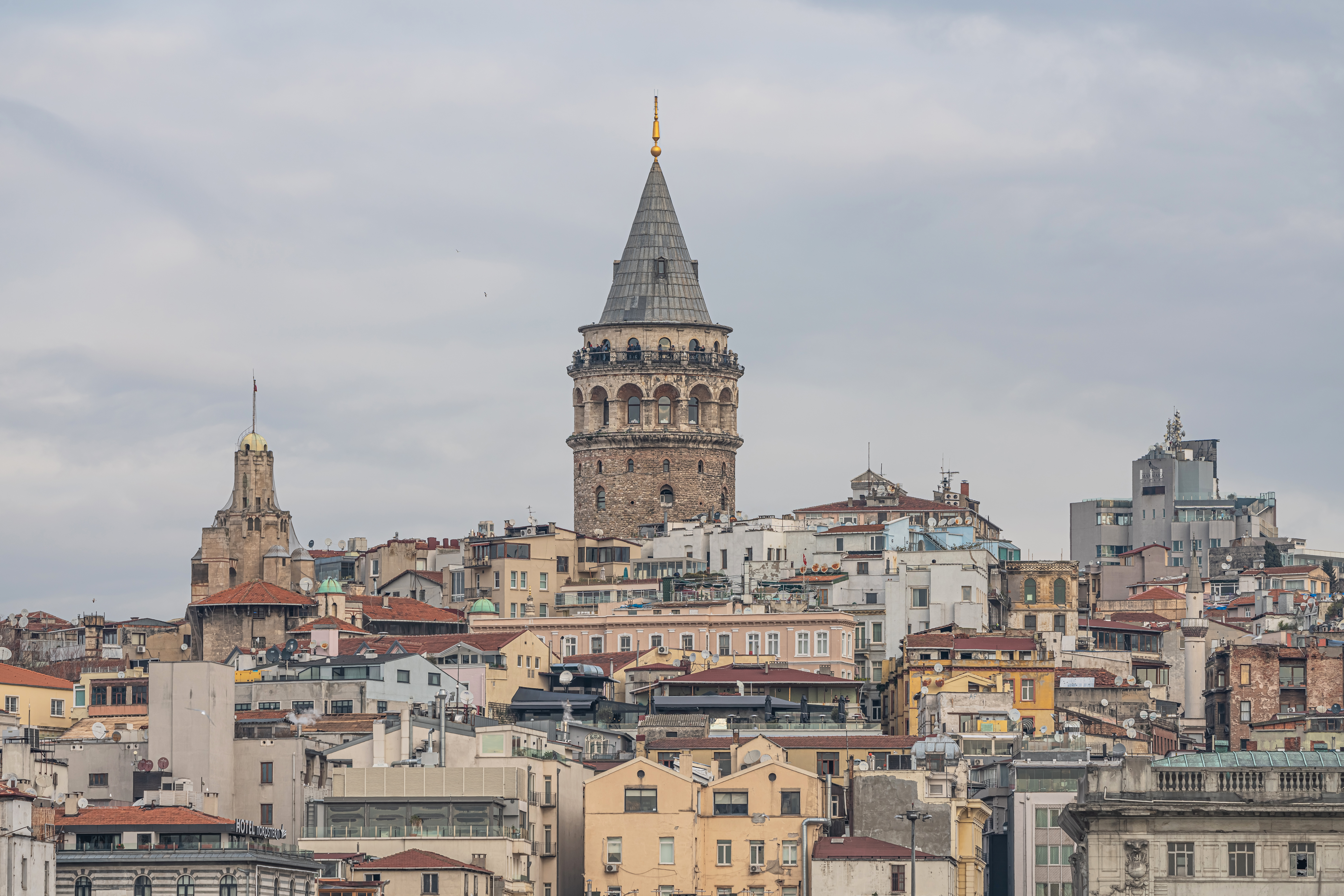
Galata Tower and part of Beyoğlu district

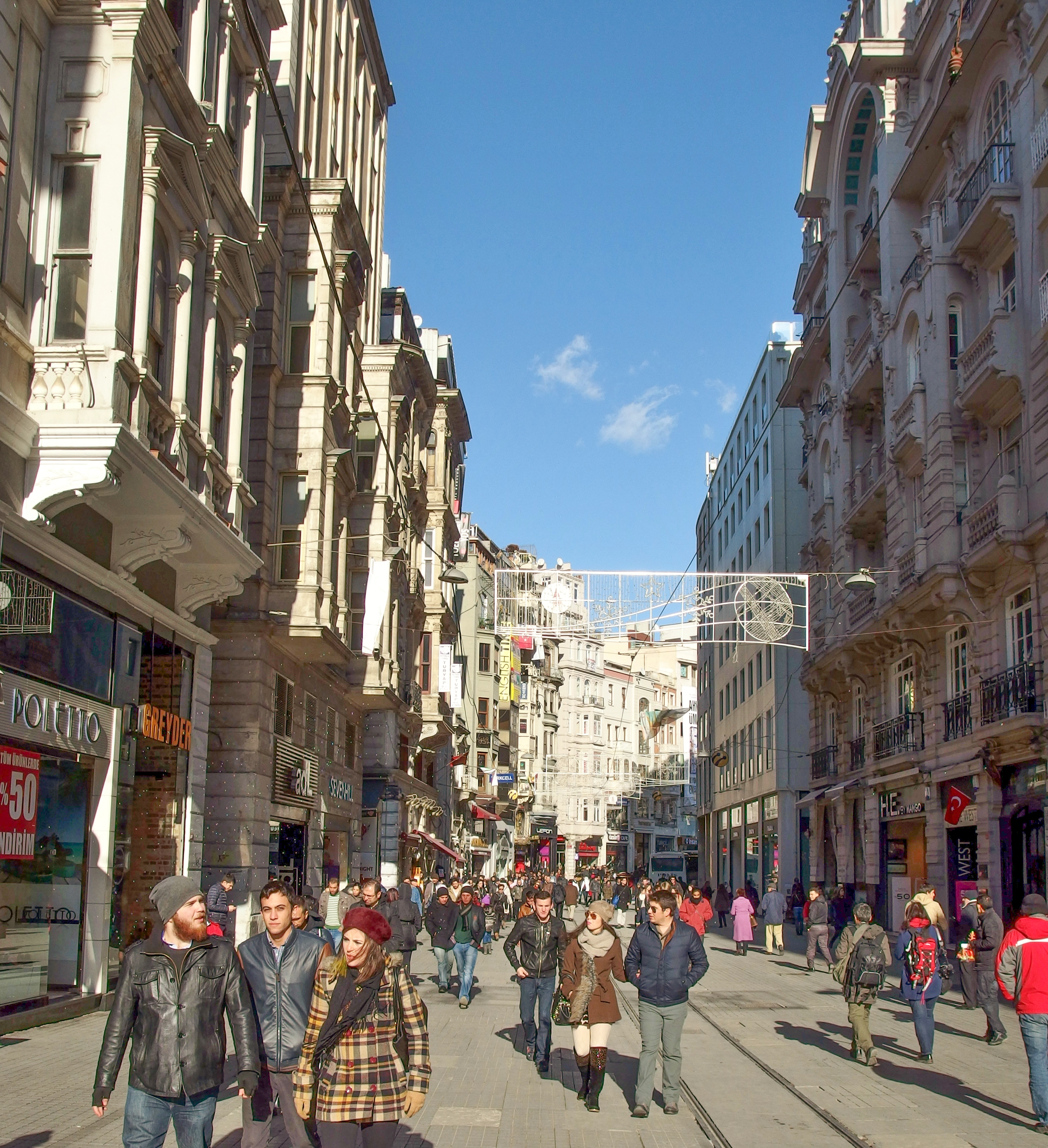
İstiklal Avenue, originally the "Grand Rue de Péra", pedestrian shopping street of Beyoğlu, formerly Pera

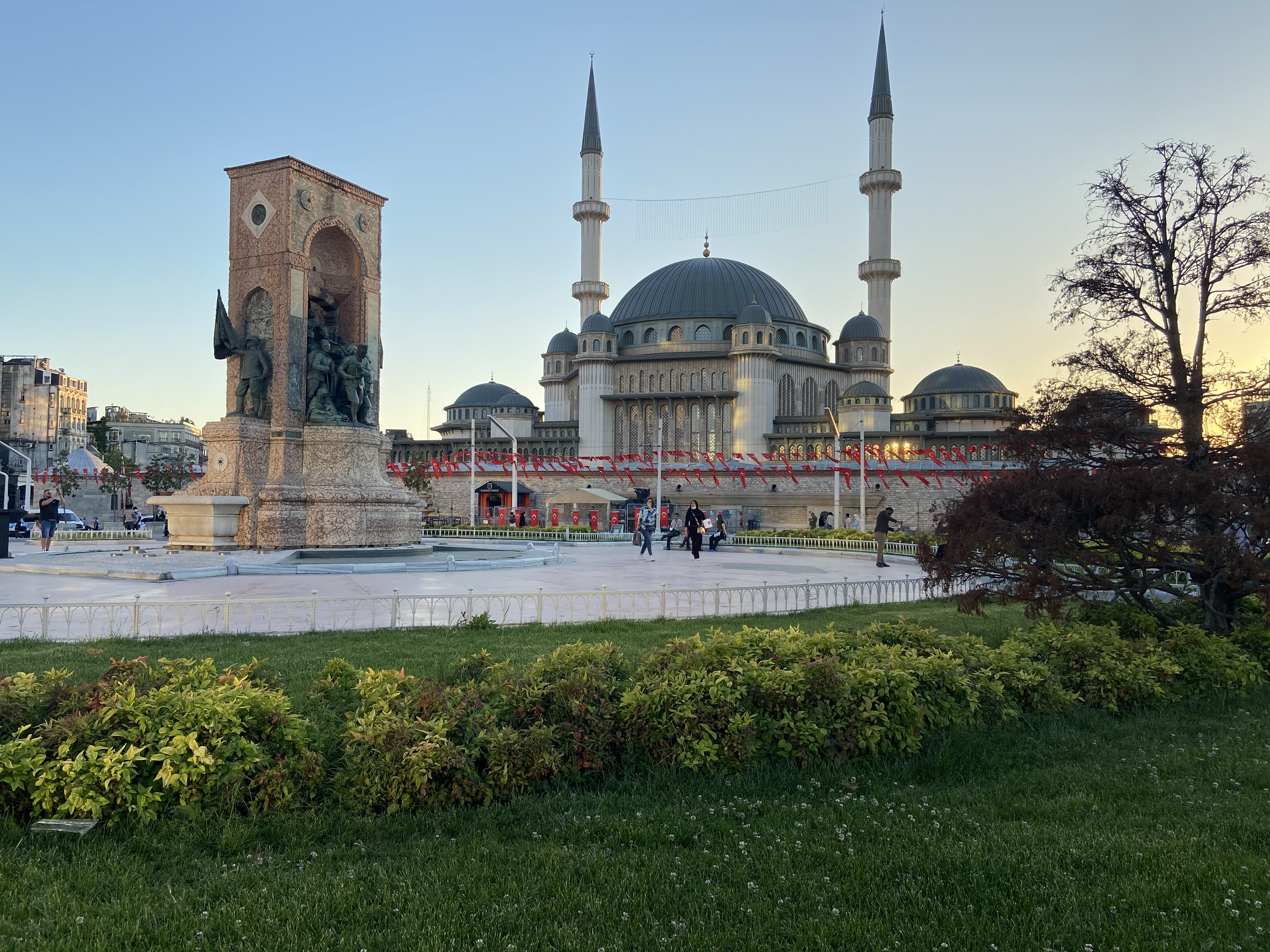
Taksim Square

- Cihangir
- Galata
- İstiklal Avenue
- Karaköy
- Taksim Square

=== Istanbul Central Business District ===
- Büyükdere Avenue runs through Beşiktaş, Şişli and Sarıyer districts, lined with residential and office towers and shopping complexes

==== Beşiktaş district ====
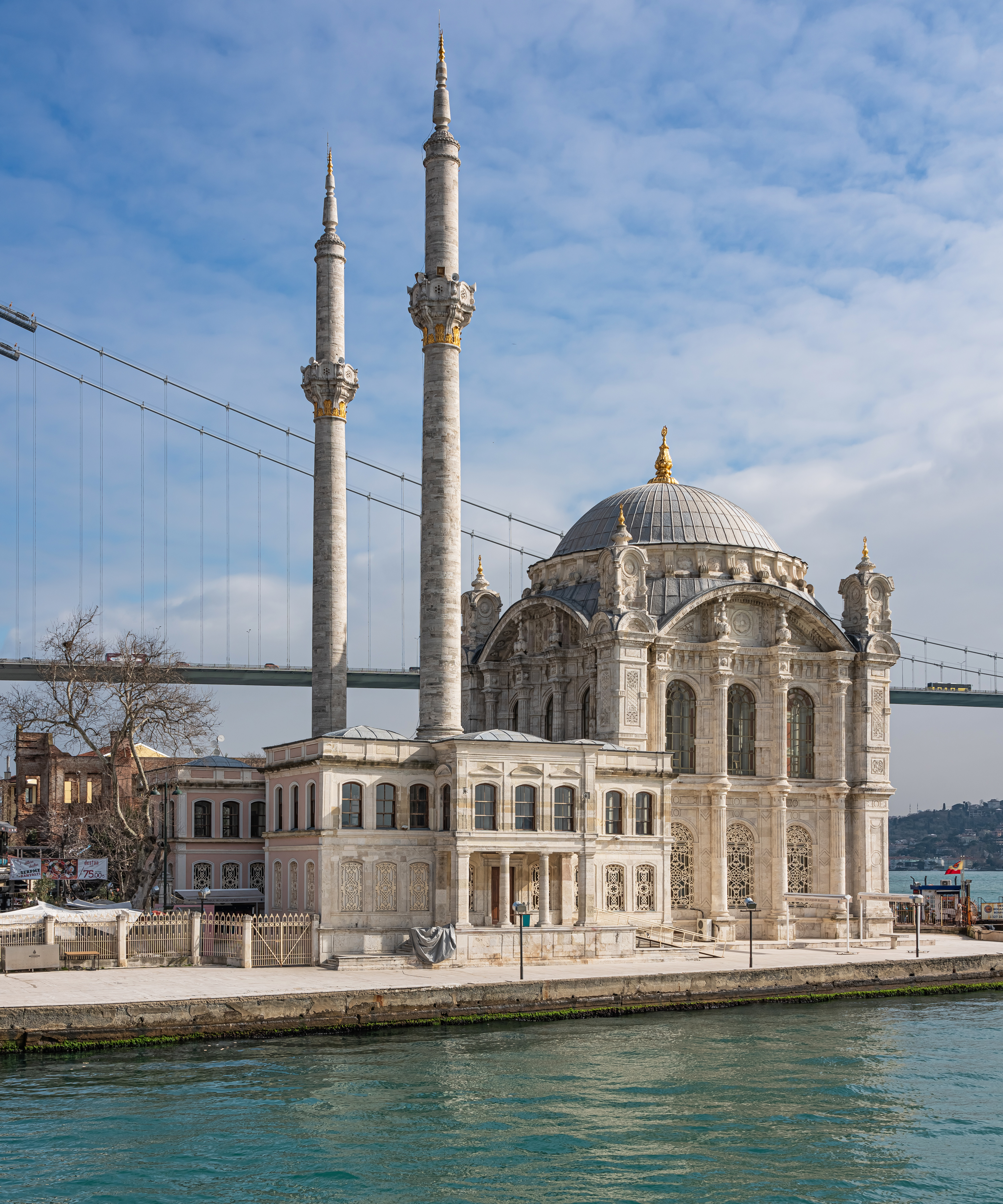
Ortaköy Mosque and the Bosphorus Bridge

- Arnavutköy
- Bebek
- Beşiktaş Çarşı
- Etiler
- Levent
- Ortaköy

==== Sarıyer district ====
- Emirgan
- Tarabya
- Yeniköy

==== Şişli district ====
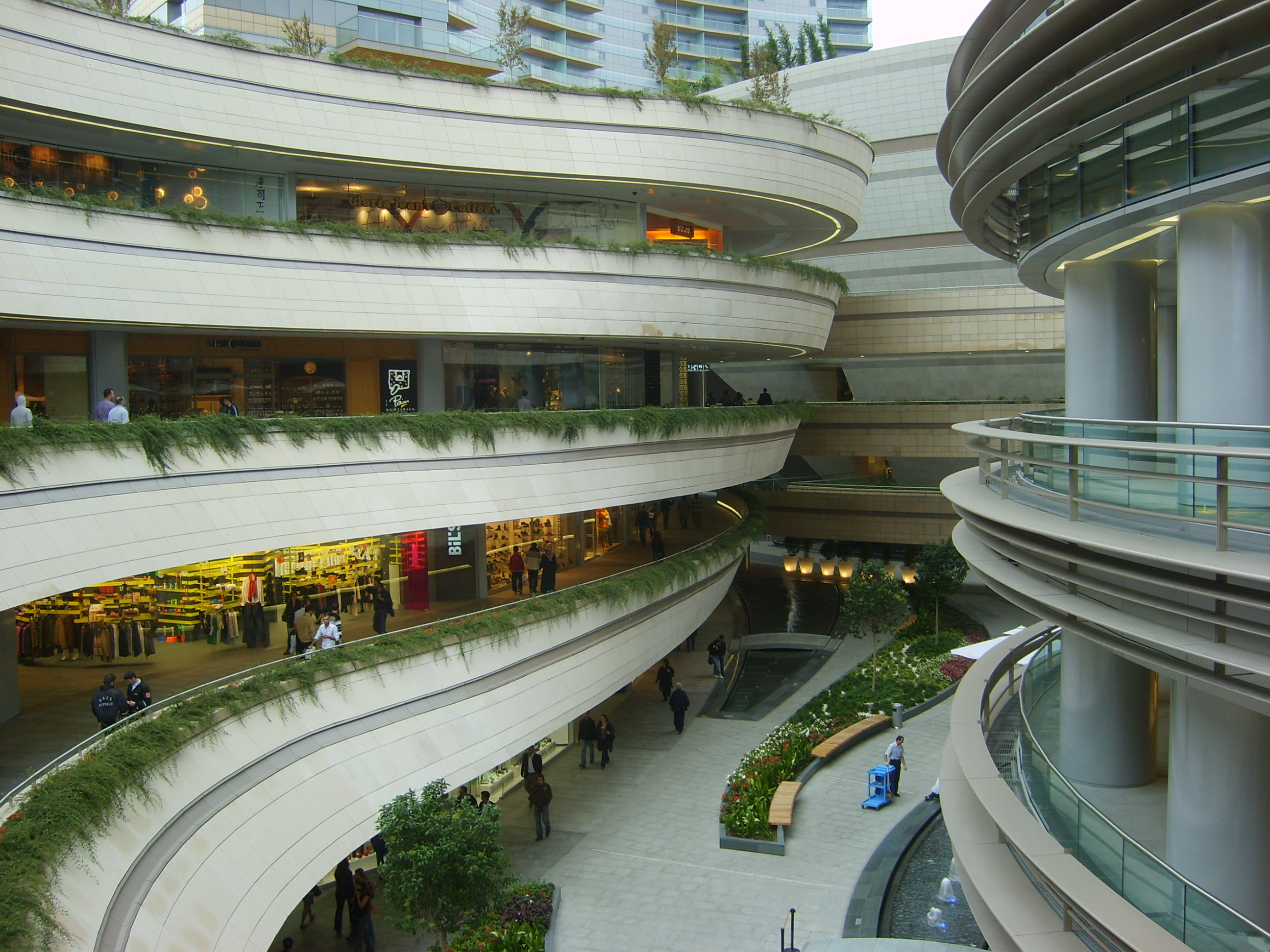
Among Istanbul's many malls, Kanyon is noted for its dramatic architecture.

- Bomonti/Şişli Merkez (original center of Şişli)
- Esentepe including Zincirlikuyu and the Zorlu Center
- Fulya
- Levent including the Metrocity, Kanyon, Özdilekpark and Istanbul Sapphire complexes
- Nişantaşı
- Otim
- Zorlu Center

=== Other areas on the European side ===
==== Bakırköy district ====
- Ataköy
- E-5/D-100 highway corridor along the north side of the old airport
- Yeşilköy (San Stefano)

==== Bahçelievler district ====
- Bahçelievler
- E-5/D-100 highway corridor along the north side of the old airport

==== Esenler district ====
- Giyimkent ("Clothing City")
- Tekstilkent ("Textile City")

==== Eyüp district ====
- Eyüp

== Asian side ==
=== Asian side central areas ===
==== Kadıköy district ====
- Kozyatağı
- Bağdat Avenue

==== Üsküdar district ====
- Altunizade
- Beylerbeyi
- Çengelköy
- Kandilli

=== Other areas on the Asian side ===
==== Ataşehir district ====
- Ataşehir

==== Beykoz district ====
- Kanlıca

==== Maltepe district ====
- Bağdat Avenue

==== Ümraniye district ====
- Ümraniye
- Dudullu

== Related lists ==
- List of museums and monuments in Istanbul
- List of universities in Istanbul
- List of schools in Istanbul
- List of architectural structures in Istanbul
- List of columns and towers in Istanbul
- List of libraries in Istanbul
- List of mayors of Istanbul
- List of Istanbulites
