= Istanbul UFO Museum =

Museum in Istanbul, Turkey

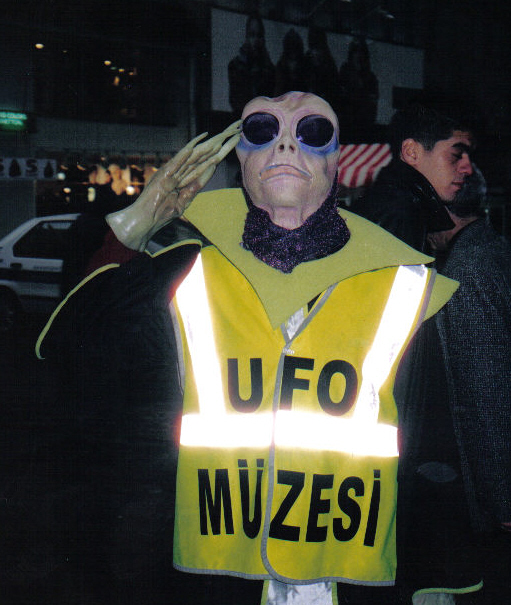
- The Istanbul UFO museum uses a man costumed as the stereotypical image of a grey for some imaginative street advertising.
- Established: 2001
- Location: Beyoğlu, Istanbul, Turkey
- Website: siriusufo.org

Istanbul UFO Museum (Turkish: İstanbul Uluslararası UFO Müzesi) was the fourth international UFO museum, and is located in the Beyoğlu district of Istanbul, Turkey. Founded by Haktan Akdoğan's Sirius UFO Space Sciences Research Center in 2001, the museum contains various photos, videos, reports, UFO-alien models, and a library about UFO's and extraterrestrial life.

In 2011, the museum reportedly had a mobile version, which travelled around Istanbul in a truck. The museum is no longer open.

== See also ==
- List of UFO organizations
