= Rami Barracks =

Ottoman and Turkish Army barracks

- Rami Kışlası
- Rami, Eyüp, Istanbul, Turkey
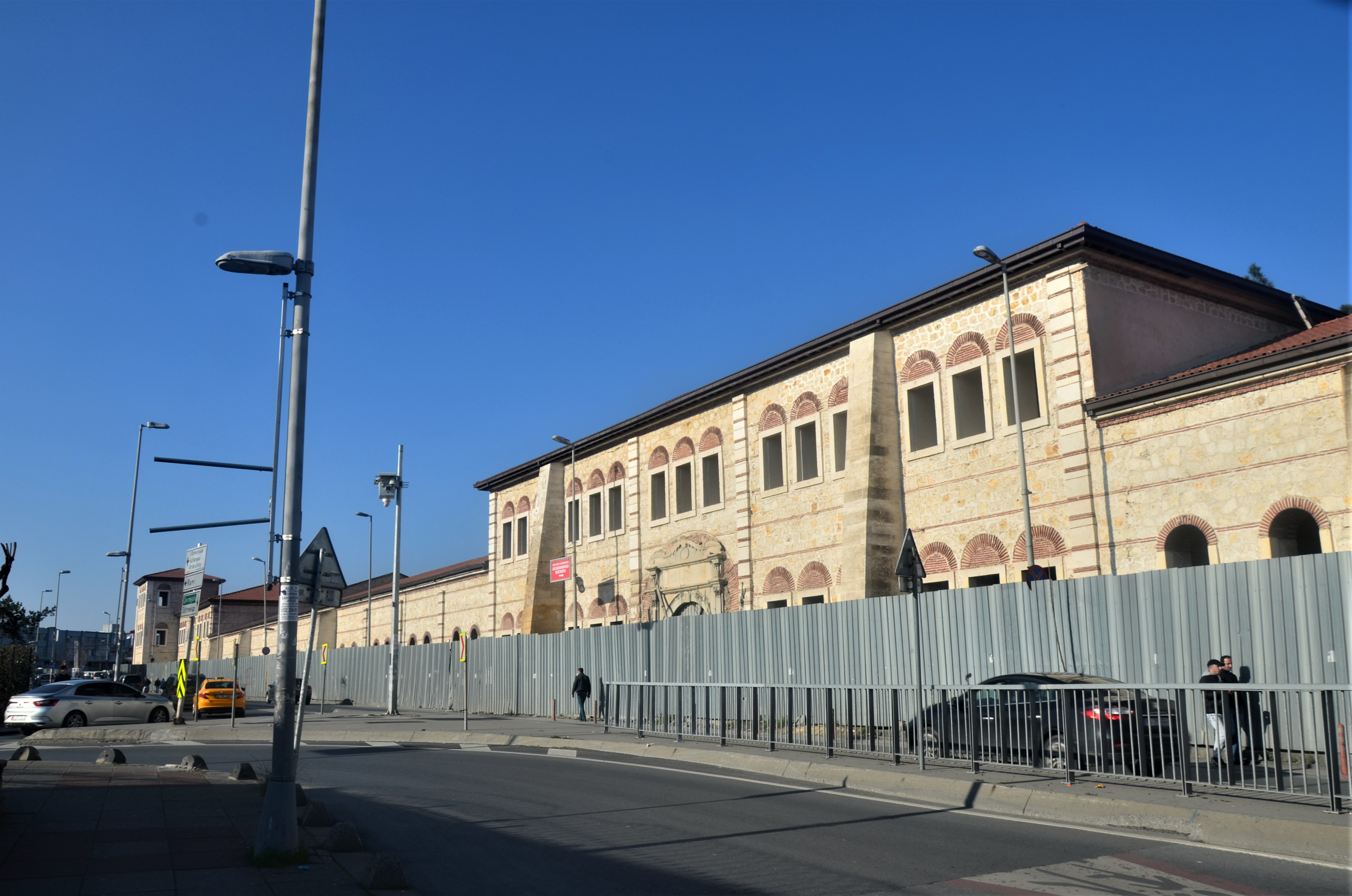
- Rami Barracks under construction for a redevelopment project.

Site information
- Owner: Metropolitan City of Istanbul
- Condition: Opened as library

Location
- Coordinates: 41°02′57″N 28°54′56″E

Site history
- Built: 1774; 252 years ago
- Built by: Sultan Mustafa III
- Materials: stone

Rami Barracks (Turkish: Rami Kışlası, Ottoman Turkish: Asâkir-i Mansure-i Muhammediye Kışlası) were an Ottoman and later Turkish Army barracks located in the Eyüp district on the European part of Istanbul, Turkey. They were built in the 1770s in the Ottoman Empire era.As of January 13, 2023, following comprehensive restoration work, the building has been re-opened and now functions as one of Istanbul’s largest public libraries.

== History ==
=== Ottoman era ===
The barracks were built during the reign of Ottoman Sultan Mustafa III between 1757 and 1774. It was later renovated and extended by Mahmud II (reigned 1808–1839) in 1828 and 1829. It is located in Rami neighborhood of Eyüp district, the then outskirts of Istanbul, the capital city of the Ottoman Empire. Historically, the site was known as the Artillery Barracks (Turkish: Topçu Kışlası) at Rami Ranch (Turkish: Rami Çiftliği). The barracks were an important military facility built for the soldiers of the newly established Nizam-ı Cedid (literally "New Order") in frame of the Ottoman military reform efforts. It was called in Ottoman Turkish: Asâkir-i Mansure-i Muhammediye Kışlası. In 1836–1837, it was renamed to Ottoman Turkish: Fünun-ı Harbiye-i Mansure after the engineer students moved in to the War School (Ottoman Turkish: Mekteb-i Harbiye) situated in the barracks. It became the military headquarters of Sultan Abdulmejid I (r.1839–1861) during the Crimean War (1853–1856). The barracks took their final form during the reign of Sultan Abdul Hamid II (r. 1876–1909). During the occupation of Istanbul (1918–1923) by the Allies of World War I, the barracks served as quarter for the Algerian detachments of the French forces.

=== Republican era ===
After 1923 in the Republican era, the barracks were in use by the Turkish Army until the 1960s. After the Turkish Army evacuated the building in the 1960s, it remained for some time unoccupied. The city council of Eyüp allocated the facility to dry food wholesalers. On 14 October 1972, the Ministry of Culture and Tourism registered the barracks as a cultural property. The facility was handed over by Turkish Armed Forces to the Metropolitan Mınicipality of Istanbul for use as a recreational area. In 1986, the facility was temporarily allocated to the food wholesalers by the then Mayor of Istanbul Bedrettin Dalan (in office 1984–1989). The food stores located on the shore of Golden Horn in Unkapanı and Eminönü causing traffic jam, pollution and noise were relocated to the Rami Barracks. Since then, the building has been partly used by food wholesalers as a market hall. There are about 1,500 food stores inside the barracks building.

== Architecture ==
The building occupies an area of 75,000 m^{2} (810,000 sq ft), of which 33,000 m^{2} (360,000 sq ft) are covered. The total useful area of the site is 220,000 m^{2} (2,400,000 sq ft).

The barracks are constructed around a rectangular shaped courtyard measuring 200 m × 200 m (660 ft × 660 ft), and features eight wings and five blocks. It was built of stone masonry and was renovated many times.

== Redevelopment ==
The Directorate of Surveying and Monuments of the city decided in 2010 to renovate the partly demolished and inauthentically modified building. A tender for this purpose was issued on 4 August 2014. Currently, the building is undergoing a complete restoration to conform with its original historical and cultural structure. When the redevelopment project is completed, it will house the country's biggest library. It is projected that the library will start with about 7 million books, printed and digital documents. The library will feature sections for children and collectors, as well as reading rooms. In addition, the building will be a center for cultural, social and artistic activities. It will include a city museum as well. Moreover, it will host about 120 commercial businesses, such as bookstores, souvenir shops, banks, cafes, restaurants, cinemas etc. A parking lot capable of holding 1,200 vehicles is planned. The cost of the redevelopment project amounts to 200 million ₺ (US$43.3 million). In January 13, 2023, re-opened as library.
