= Antonietta Gambara Untersteiner =

Turkish composer

Composer and pianist Antonietta Gambara Untersteiner (1846 – 27 May 1896) was born in Istanbul, Ottoman Empire, but lived in Italy most of her life.

Untersteiner studied music at the Milan Conservatory from 1874 to 1876 and graduated with a prize. Milan Conservatory director Antonio Bazzini questioned whether to admit female students, but noted in a letter to Conservatory of San Pietro a Majella director Giuseppe Martucci that the only candidate worthy of admission in 1874 was Untersteiner.

== Compositions ==
Untersteiner's music was published by Casa Ricordi. Her compositions include:

Orchestra

- God and Satan (symphonic poem; also arranged for two pianos)

Piano

- God and Satan (two pianos)

Theatre

- Sul Baltico (On the Baltic)

Vocal

- songs in French and Italian
