= Culture of Istanbul =

Overview of culture in Istanbul

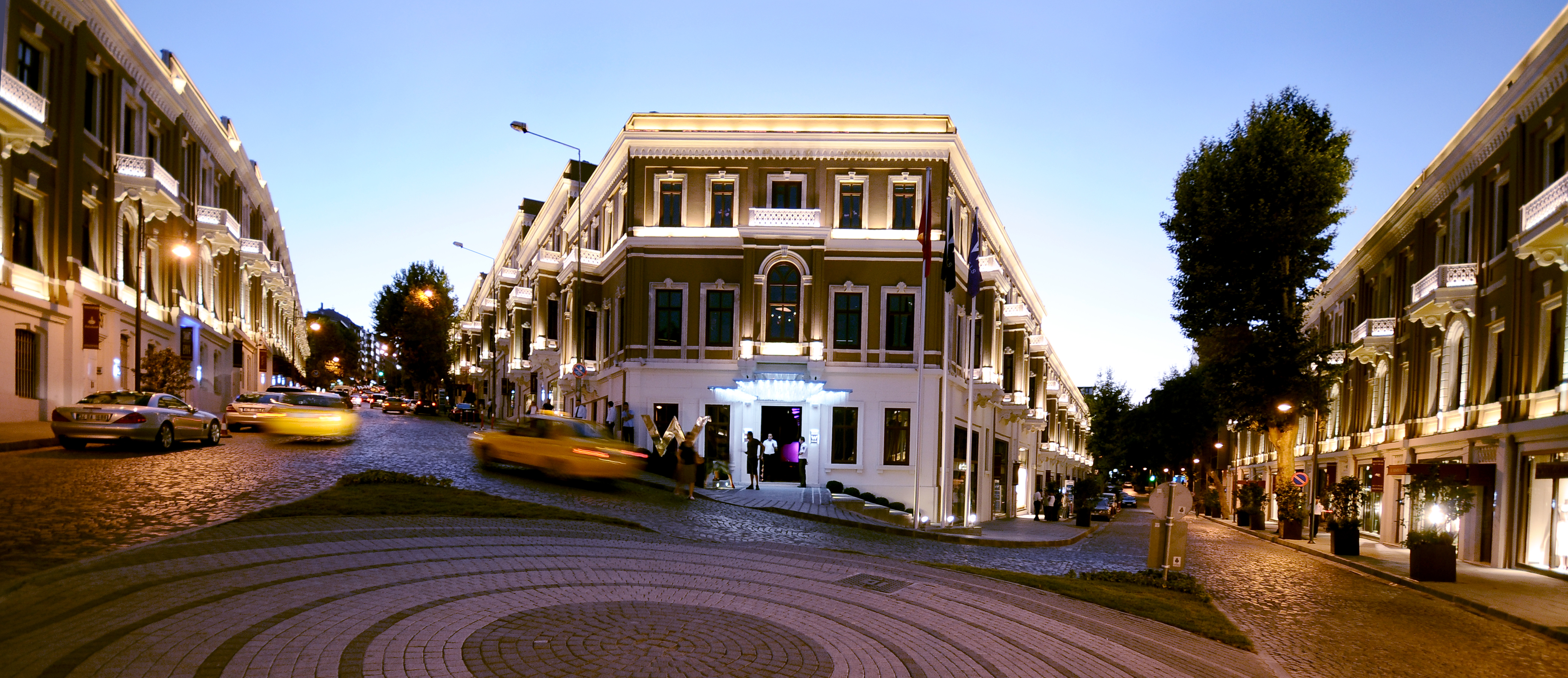
Akaretler Street in Istanbul

The culture of Istanbul (Turkish: İstanbul Kültürü) has its basis in the city that has been the capital of the Byzantine and Ottoman Empires. However, when the Turkish Republic turned its focus away from Istanbul and toward Ankara, the city's cultural scene throughout the mid-20th century lay relatively stagnant, seeing limited success on the international, and even national, level. The government of the new republic established programs that served to engender Turks toward musical traditions originating in Europe, but musical institutions and visits by foreign classical artists were primarily centered in the new capital. Although much of Turkey's culture had its roots in Istanbul, it was not until the 1980s and 1990s that Istanbul reemerged globally as a city whose cultural significance is not solely based on its past glory.

== Fine arts ==
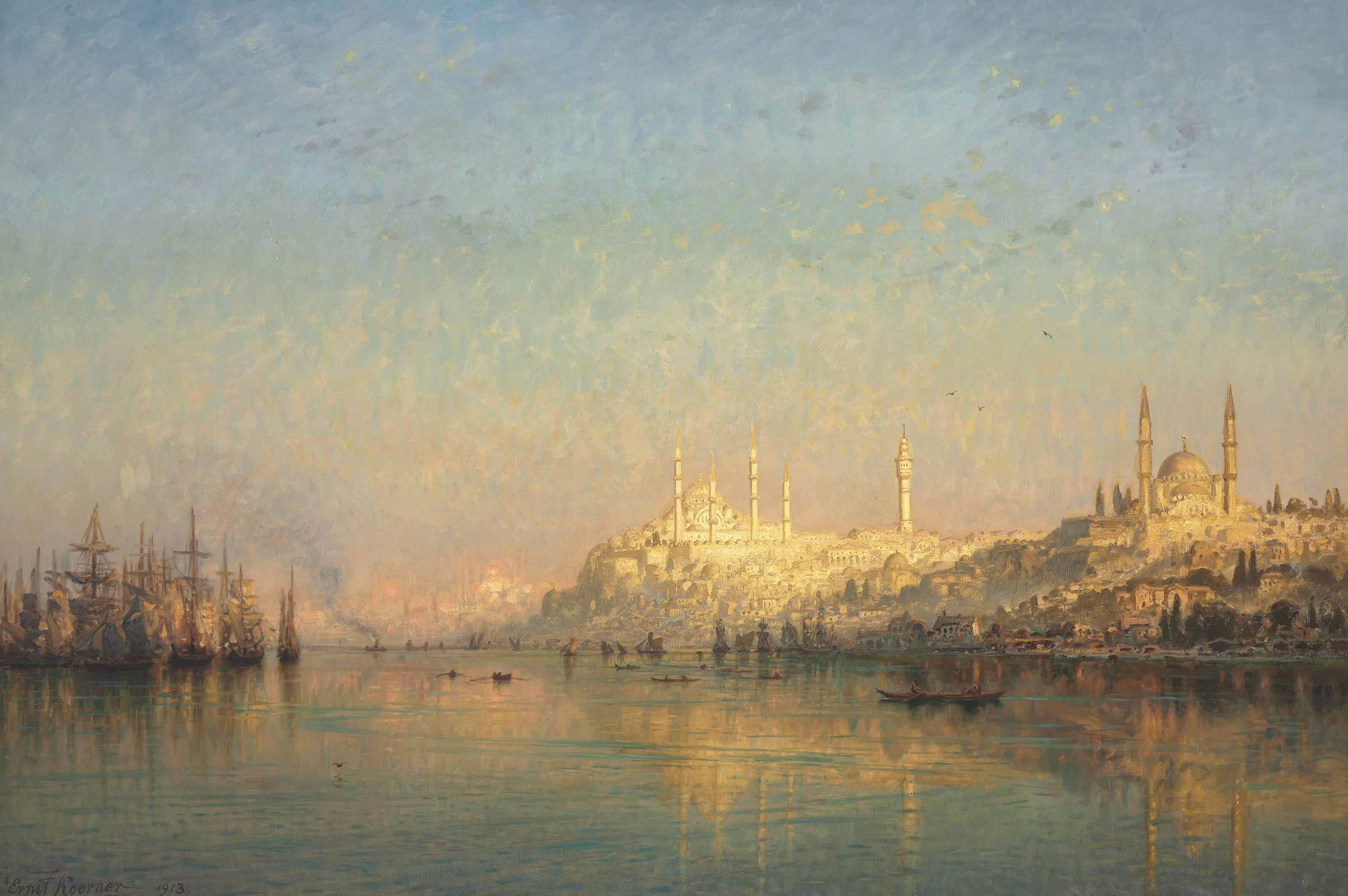
On the Golden Horn, before the Süleymaniye Mosque, Constantinople by Ernst Koerner, 1913

Traditional visual art forms in Istanbul date back to the Ottoman era, when European and Ottoman painters began to depict the city's landscape in their work. By the end of the 19th century, Istanbul had established itself as a regional artistic center, with Turkish, European, and Middle Eastern artists flocking to the city. Despite efforts to make Ankara Turkey's cultural heart, Istanbul's Fine Arts Academy (now the Mimar Sinan Fine Arts University) remained the country's primary institution of art until the 1970s. Since then, Istanbul has reemerged as the country's artistic center, as artists formerly based in Ankara moved in, taking advantage of universities and art journals founded during the 1980s. Art in Istanbul began to be seen as having an analytical role, rather than just being an elitist culture concerned only with aesthetics. Turkish artists continue to depict orientalist themes for an international audience, but art in the city now also addresses Turkish political themes or simply resembles Western contemporary art. Beyoğlu has been transformed into the artistic center of the city, with young artists and older Turkish artists formerly residing abroad finding footing there. Exhibition spaces, auction houses, and museums of modern art, including İstanbul Modern, have further contributed to the cosmopolitan nature of the district.

Still, Istanbul's contemporary arts have struggled to pique the interest of visitors. The Ministry of Culture and Tourism estimated that, in 2009, there were 69 museums in Istanbul, comparable to London's seventy-six and Barcelona's fifty-one. The city's most popular—the Hagia Sophia and Topkapı Palace, with Chora Church a distant third—are of a historical nature, buildings stripped of their religious and political functions and converted to museums. While not as profitable, the Istanbul Archaeology Museums are among the most significant in Turkey, regarded as ushering in the era of modern museums in the country; established in 1891 in a purpose-built structure, the set of three museums together hold a collection of a million artifacts. Istanbul's most popular gallery dedicated to the visual arts is the Turkish and Islamic Arts Museum, although its exhibits also feature works prior to the 20th century. İstanbul Modern, the Pera Museum, and SantralIstanbul are among the museums that opened north of the Golden Horn during the 2000s in an effort to fill that void but, while they have received acclaim, they have yet to receive the number of visitors their predecessors on the historic peninsula have.

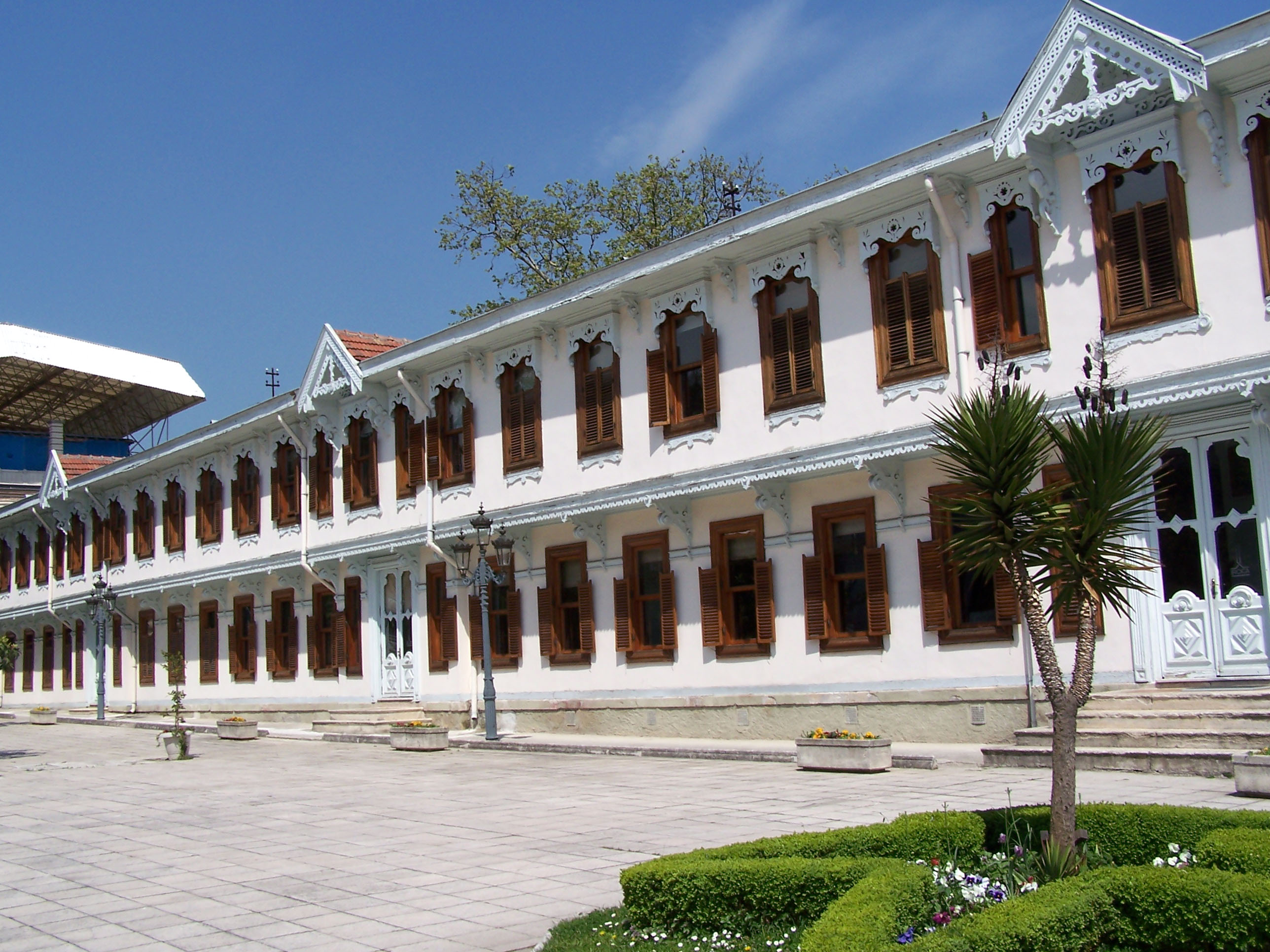
Yıldız Palace hosted Turkey's first movie screening in 1896.

Cinema has a long history in Istanbul, with the first screening in the country at Yıldız Palace in 1896, just a year after the technology publicly debuted in Paris. Movie theaters rapidly cropped up in Beyoğlu, with the greatest concentration of theaters being along the street now known as İstiklal Avenue. Istanbul also became the heart of Turkey's nascent film industry, although Turkish films were not consistently developed until the 1950s. Since then, Istanbul has been the most popular location to film Turkish dramas and comedies. In the interim, movie theaters primarily showed foreign films from the most-profitable American and European markets. While the Turkish film industry ramped up in the second half of the century, it was not until the 2002 film Uzak, set and filmed in Istanbul, that the nation's films saw substantial international success. Istanbul and its picturesque skyline have also served as a backdrop for a number of American and European films, including America America (1963), From Russia with Love (1963), Midnight Express (1978),The World Is Not Enough (1999), The International (2009), and Tinker Tailor Soldier Spy (2011). Indian filmmakers have also recently discovered Istanbul's cinematic allure, with Guru (2007) and Mission Istaanbul (2008) filmed there.

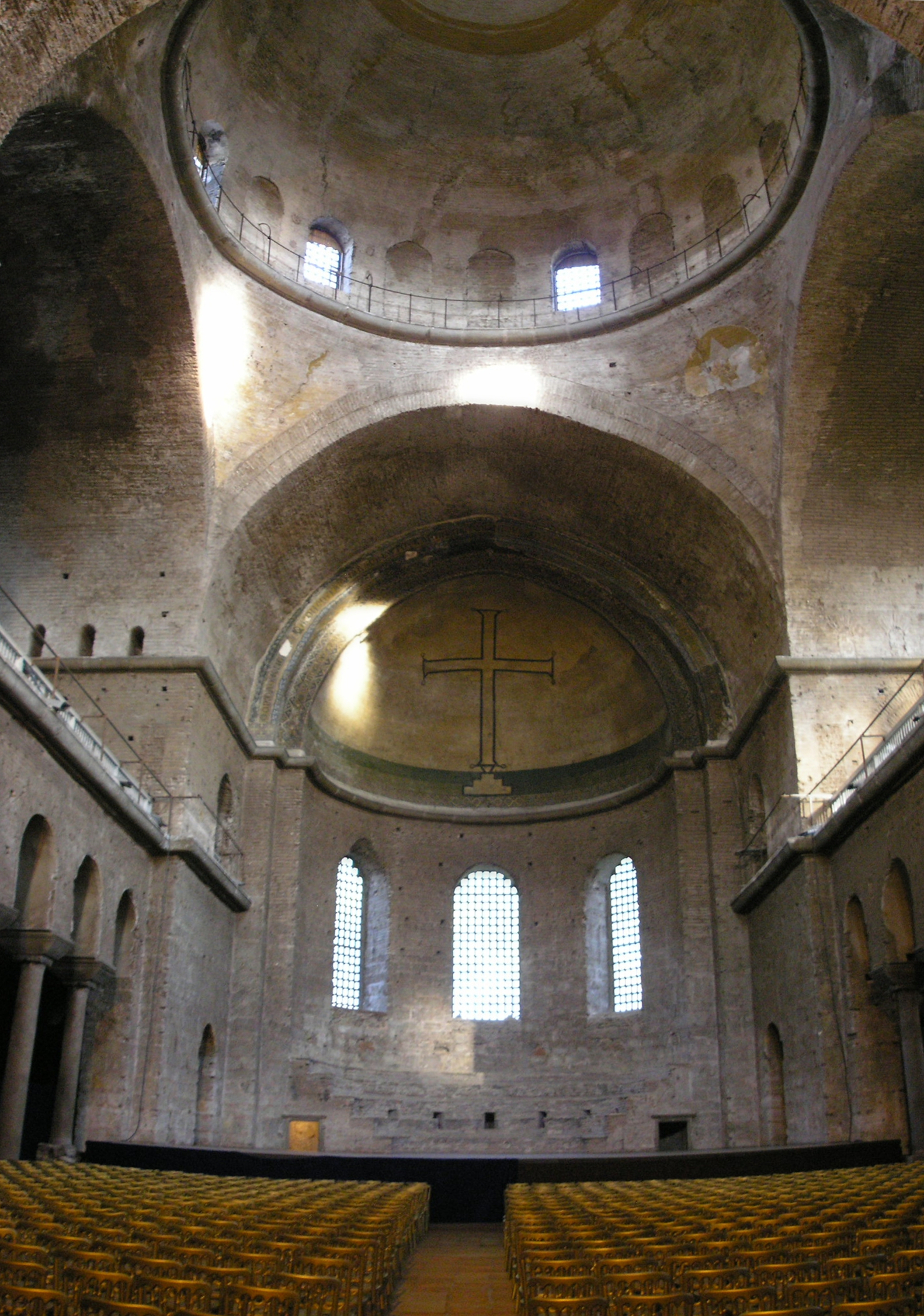
Classical music concerts are often held at the Hagia Irene.

Coinciding with this reemergence on the cultural scene was the establishment of number of festivals now organized by the Istanbul Foundation for Culture and Arts. The oldest of these was the Istanbul Festival, which began showcasing a variety of art—music, dance, visual art, and film—from Turkey and around the world in 1973. From this flagship festival came the International Istanbul Film Festival and the Istanbul International Jazz Festival in the early 1980s. With its focus now solely on music and dance, the Istanbul Festival has been known as the Istanbul International Music Festival since 1994. The most prominent of the festivals that evolved from the original Istanbul Festival is the Istanbul Biennial, held every two years since 1987. While its early incarnations were aimed at showcasing Turkish visual art, it has since opened to international artists and risen in prestige to become among the elite biennales, alongside the Venice Biennale and the São Paulo Art Biennial. Live shows and concerts are hosted in a number of purpose-built venues across the city, including Atatürk Cultural Center, Cemal Reşit Rey Concert Hall, and the Cemil Topuzlu Open-Air Theatre, but cultural events are sometimes held at historical sites (such as the Hagia Irene, Rumeli Fortress, Gülhane Park, and the courtyard of Topkapı Palace.)

== Leisure and entertainment ==
Hamams ("Turkish baths") were a staple of Ottoman society, and although some have since been converted to cafes or stand as unused, historic relics, they still have a place in modern Istanbul. Popular among Turks and tourists alike, many hamams, such as Cağaloğlu Hamam, have been continuously operated for hundreds of years. For those opting to cool off instead, the city has recently reopened many of its beaches along the Sea of Marmara and the Bosphorus; Bakırköy, Küçükçekmece, and Sarıyer are among the most frequented beachside locations in the city today.

Istanbul does not have a primary urban park, unlike other large cities, but it does have green areas in different parts of the city.Gülhane Park and Yıldız Park were originally included within the grounds of two of Istanbul's palaces—Topkapı Palace and Yıldız Palace—but they were repurposed as public parks in the early decades of the Turkish Republic. Across from Yıldız Palace, adjacent to the Bosphorus Bridge, Fethi Paşa Korusu resides on a hillside on the Anatolian side of the Bosphorus. Along the European side of the Bosphorus, and closer to the Fatih Sultan Mehmet Bridge, is Emirgan Park; originally a private estate belonging to Ottoman leaders, the 47-hectare (120-acre) park is known for its diversity of plants and an annual tulip festival held since 2005. Popular during the summer among Istanbulites escaping the city is Belgrad Forest, expanding across a vast 5,500-hectare (14,000-acre) area at the northern edge of the city. The forest originally supplied water to the city, remnants of reservoirs used during Byzantine and Ottoman times can still be observed within.

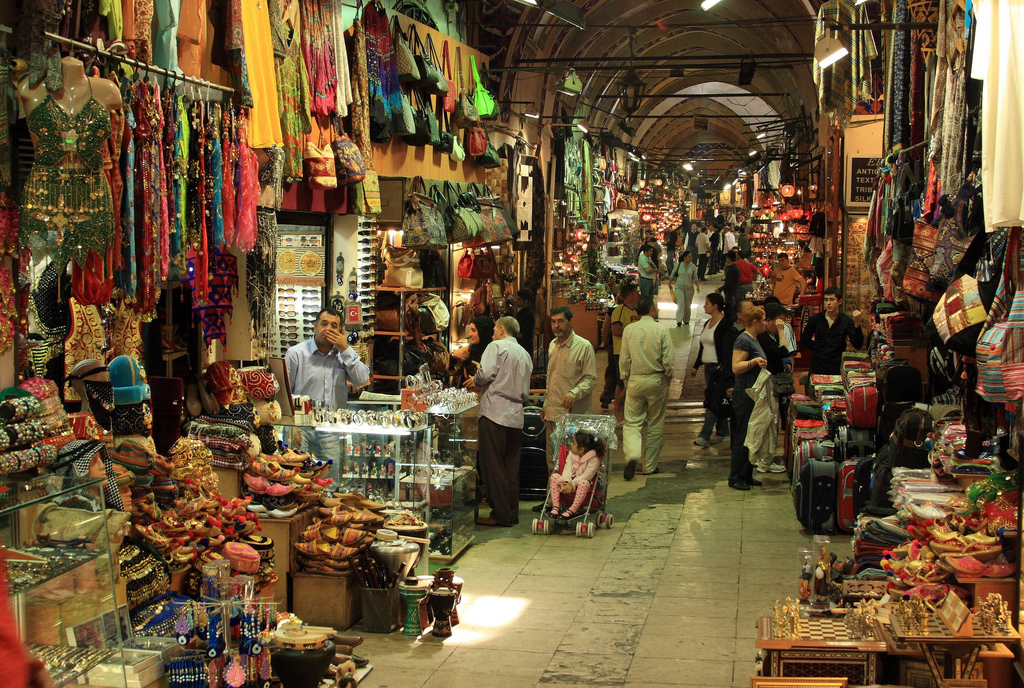
The Grand Bazaar is one of the largest covered markets in the world.

Istanbul has numerous shopping centers, from the historic to the modern. The Grand Bazaar is among the world's oldest and largest covered markets, having been in operation since 1461. Mahmutpaşa Bazaar, established a year later, extends between the Grand Bazaar and the Egyptian Bazaar, which has been Istanbul's major spice market since 1660. Galleria Ataköy ushered in the age of modern shopping malls in Turkey when it opened in 1987. Since then, malls have become major shopping centers outside the historic peninsula. Akmerkez was awarded the title of Europe's best shopping mall by the International Council of Shopping Centers, while Istanbul Cevahir has been among the continent's largest since opening in 2005. Abdi İpekçi Street in Nişantaşı and Bağdat Avenue on the Anatolian side of the city have evolved into high-end shopping districts, while İstiklal Avenue forms the backbone of Beyoğlu.

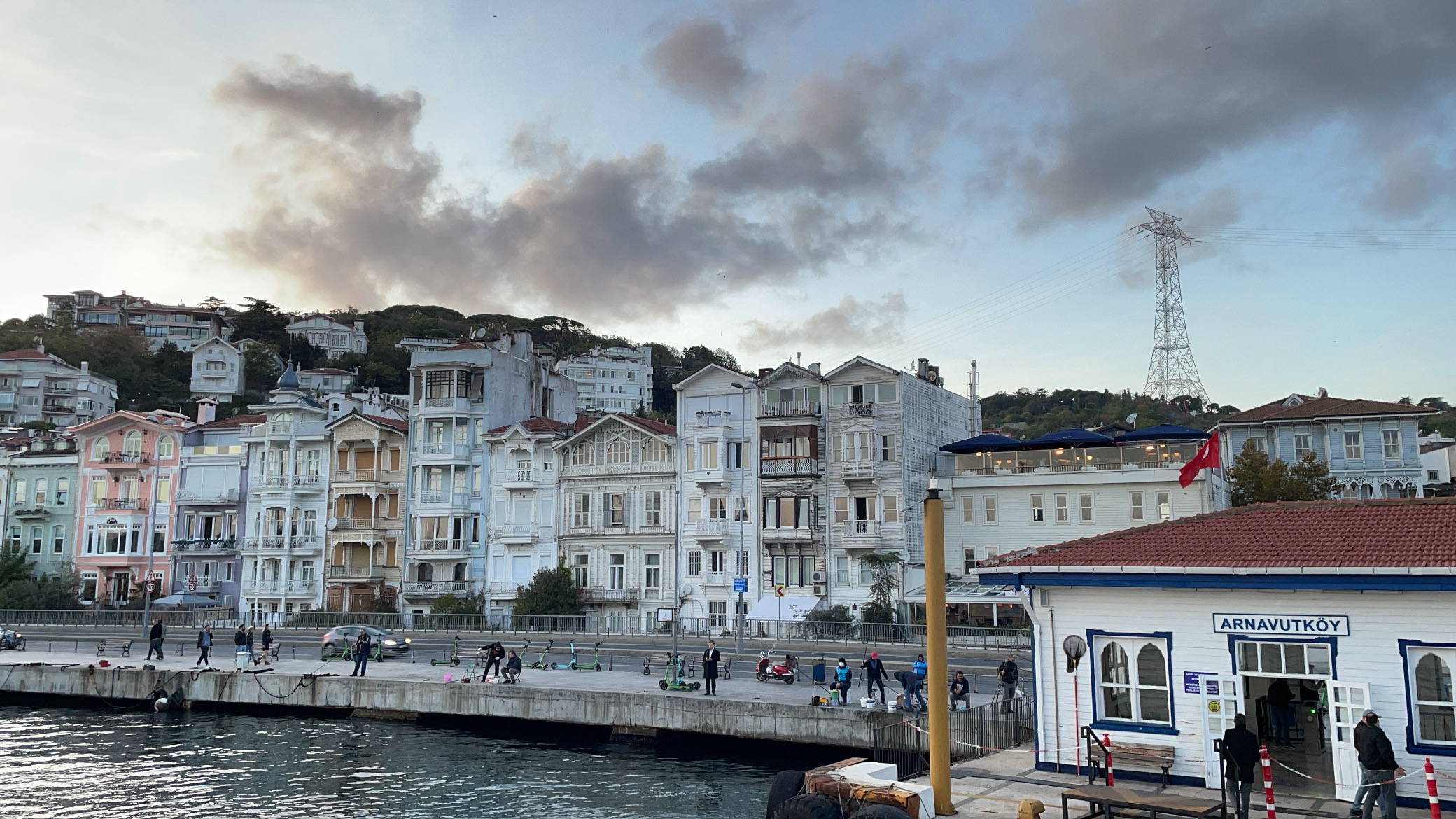
The quarters of Bebek, Arnavutköy and Yeniköy on the Bosphorus are famous for their seafood restaurants.

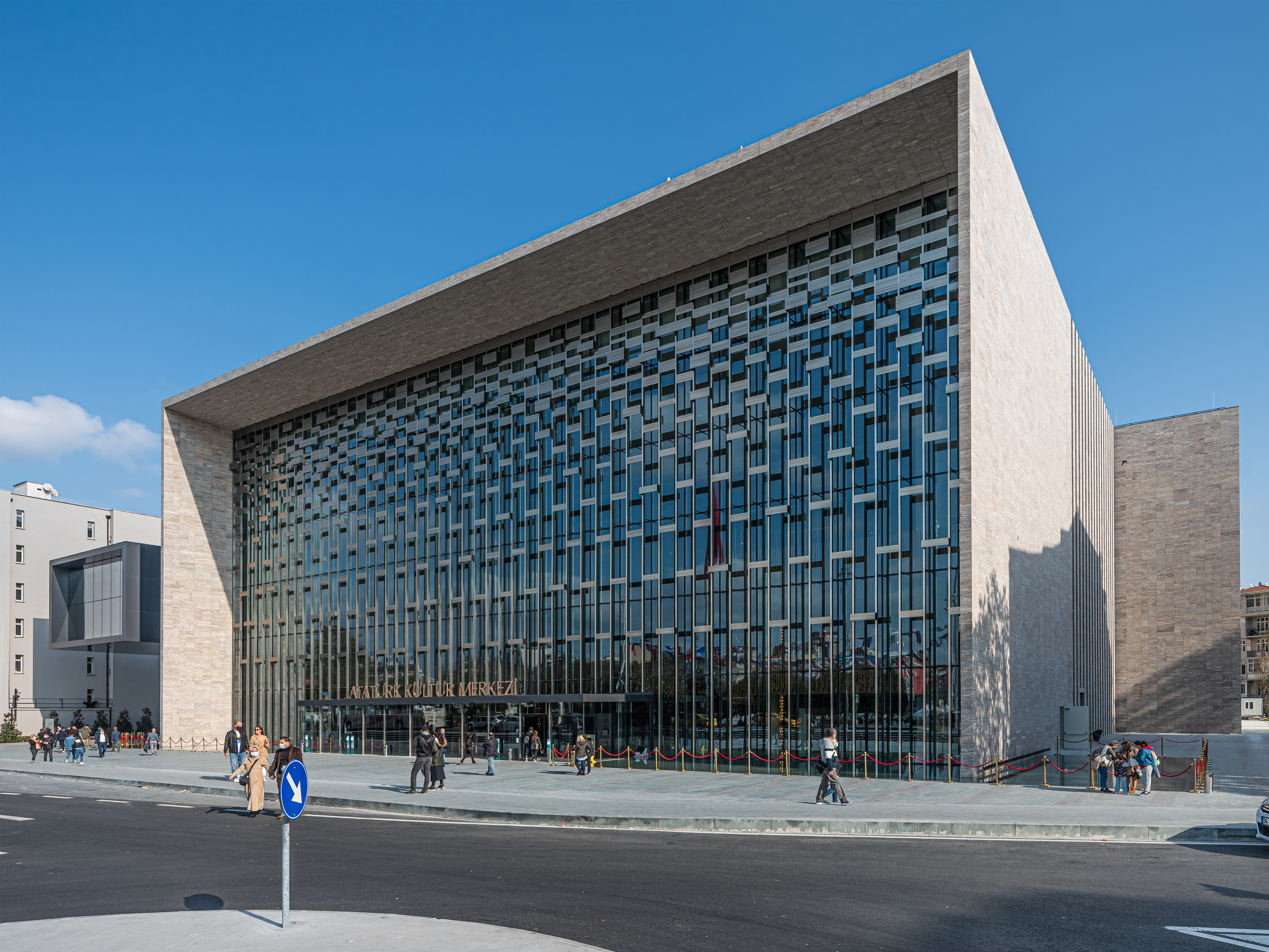
Atatürk Cultural Center in Taksim Square serves as the opera house of Istanbul.

Aside from typical Turkish cuisine like kebab, Istanbul is also famous for its historic seafood restaurants. Many of the city's most popular and upscale seafood restaurants line the shores of the Bosphorus (in particular, the neighbourhoods of Ortaköy, Bebek, Arnavutköy and Yeniköy on the European side; and Beylerbeyi, Çengelköy and Kandilli on the Asian side) while the Kumkapı neighborhood along the Sea of Marmara has a pedestrian zone that hosts around fifty fish restaurants. The Princes' Islands, 15 kilometers (9 mi) from the city center, are also popular for their seafood restaurants. Because of their restaurants, historic summer mansions, and tranquil, car-free atmospheres, the Princes' Islands are a popular vacation destination among Istanbulites and foreign tourists. Istanbul also has many restaurants offering various versions the famous Turkish breakfast. Breakfast consists of marinated olives, honey, butter, eggs, sausage, jams, cucumbers, tomatoes, kaymak and menemen.

Restaurants featuring foreign cuisine also thrive in the city, especially in the Beyoğlu district. Residing along İstiklal Avenue is the Çiçek Pasajı, originally built by Greek philanthropist Christakis Zografos as apartment building and shopping center known as Cité de Pera. In the mid-20th century, the building's focus shifted toward nightlife, the Çiçek Pasajı has been to home to upscale winehouses (known as meyhanes), pubs, and restaurants. While the focus of İstiklal Avenue, originally famous for its taverns, has shifted the other direction—away from nightlife and toward shopping—the nearby Nevizade Street still retains its reputation for being lined with winehouses and pubs. Some other neighborhoods around İstiklal Avenue have recently been revamped to cater to Beyoğlu's nightlife; Cezayir Sokağı ("Algeria Street") is at the center of such a transformed area, as it is now lined with pubs, cafés, and restaurants playing live music.

Other focal points for Istanbul's nightlife are the high-end neighborhoods of Nişantaşı and Bebek, as well as, to a lesser extent, Kadıköy on the other side of the Bosphorus. Open-air seaside nightclubs, popular during the summertime, primarily line the European side of the Bosphorus, between Beyoğlu and the Ortaköy neighborhood by the Bosphorus Bridge.

== Sports ==
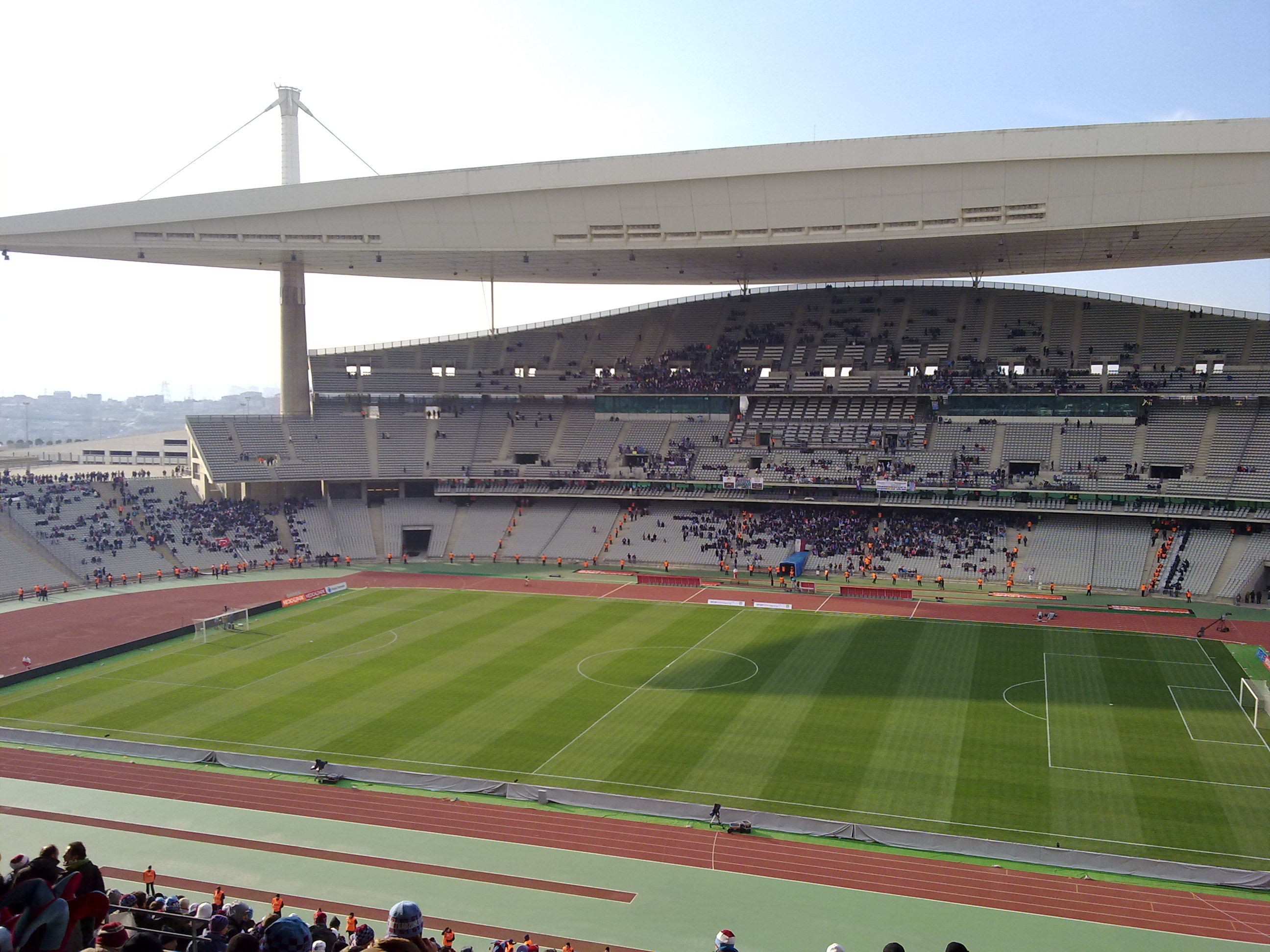
With a capacity of 76,092 spectators, Atatürk Olympic Stadium is Turkey's largest multi-purpose stadium. It hosted the 2005 UEFA Champions League Final.

During the Roman and Byzantine periods, the most important sporting events in Constantinople were the quadriga chariot races that were held at the Hippodrome of Constantinople, which had a capacity of more than 100,000 spectators. Today, sports remain very popular in Istanbul, which has been named the 2012 European Capital of Sport. Its sports prowess is known across Turkey for being home to the country's oldest—and by some measures, most successful—sports clubs.

Beşiktaş J.K., established in 1903, is considered the oldest of these sports clubs; due to its initial status as Turkey's only club, it occasionally played as the national team. Its football team has seen several periods of dominance in national competition, particularly in the 1940s and early 1990s, but Istanbul's Galatasaray S.K. (est. 1905) and Fenerbahçe S.K. (est. 1907) tie for the honor of winning the most national championships. Galatasaray and Fenerbahçe have also excelled at the international level, with the former having won the 1999–2000 UEFA Cup and the latter having reached the quarterfinals of the 2007–08 UEFA Champions League. The two clubs have a long-standing rivalry across the Bosphorus, with Galatasaray based in European Istanbul and Fenerbahçe based in the Anatolian part of the city. The basketball teams for Beşiktaş, Galatasaray and Fenerbahçe, along with Anadolu Efes S.K., have also enjoyed success while Fenerbahçe, Eczacıbaşı, and Vakıfbank have performed well in volleyball.

Many of Istanbul's sports facilities were built or upgraded during the 2000s in an effort to bolster the city's bids for the Summer Olympic Games. Atatürk Olympic Stadium, the largest multi-purpose stadium in Turkey, was completed in 2002 as a five-star (now Category 4) UEFA stadium (Note: While UEFA does not apparently keep a list of Category 4 stadiums, regulations stipulate that only Category 4 (formerly five-star) stadiums are eligible to host UEFA Champions League Finals, which Atatürk Olympic Stadium did in 2005, and UEFA Europa League (formerly UEFA Cup) Finals, which Şükrü Saracoğlu Stadium did in 2009.) and an IAAF first-class venue for track and field. The stadium hosted the 2005 UEFA Champions League Final and remains the home field of İstanbul Büyükşehir Belediyespor. Şükrü Saracoğlu Stadium, Fenerbahçe's home field, is also a five-star UEFA stadium, completed in 2006; it hosted the 2009 UEFA Cup Final, the only UEFA Cup final to take place outside the European continent and the last before the Cup was replaced by the UEFA Europa League. Türk Telekom Arena also opened in 2011 to replace Ali Sami Yen Stadium as Galatasaray's home turf; the arena, alongside Atatürk Olympic Stadium, served as the centerpiece of Turkey's unsuccessful bid for UEFA Euro 2016.

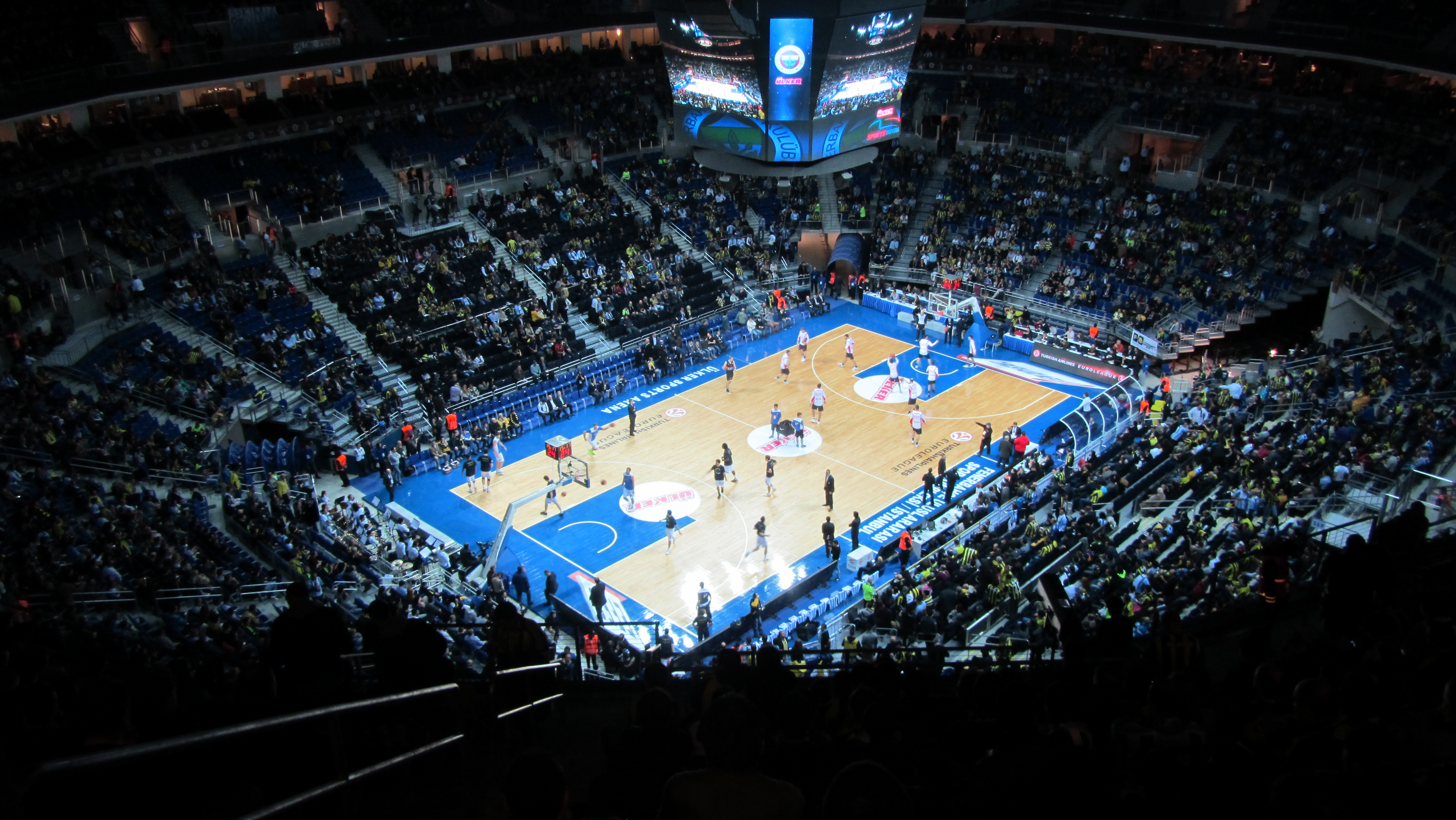
Ülker Sports Arena, completed in 2012, is the new home court of Fenerbahçe's basketball teams.

The Sinan Erdem Dome, among the largest indoor arenas in Europe, hosted the final of the 2010 FIBA World Championship, the 2012 IAAF World Indoor Championships, and the 2011–12 Euroleague Final Four. Prior to the completion of the Sinan Erdem Dome in 2010, Abdi İpekçi Arena (completed in 1986) was Istanbul's primary indoor arena; it hosted the finals of the 1991–92 FIBA European Championship and Eurobasket 2001. Several other indoor arenas, including the Beşiktaş Milangaz Arena (which opened in 2004), have also been inaugurated since 2000, serving as the home courts of Istanbul's sports clubs. The most recent of these is the 13,800-seat Ülker Sports Arena, which opened in 2012 as the home court of Fenerbahçe's basketball teams.

Despite the construction boom, Istanbul's four consecutive bids for the Summer Olympics—in 2000, 2004, 2008, and 2012—have all ended unsuccessfully. The National Olympic Committee of Turkey opted to forgo a bid for the 2016 Games to concentrate on a bid for the 2020 Summer Olympics. The International Olympic Committee selected Istanbul as a Candidate City to host city of the 2020 Olympics in May 2012. The IOC will vote to elect the host city in September 2013.

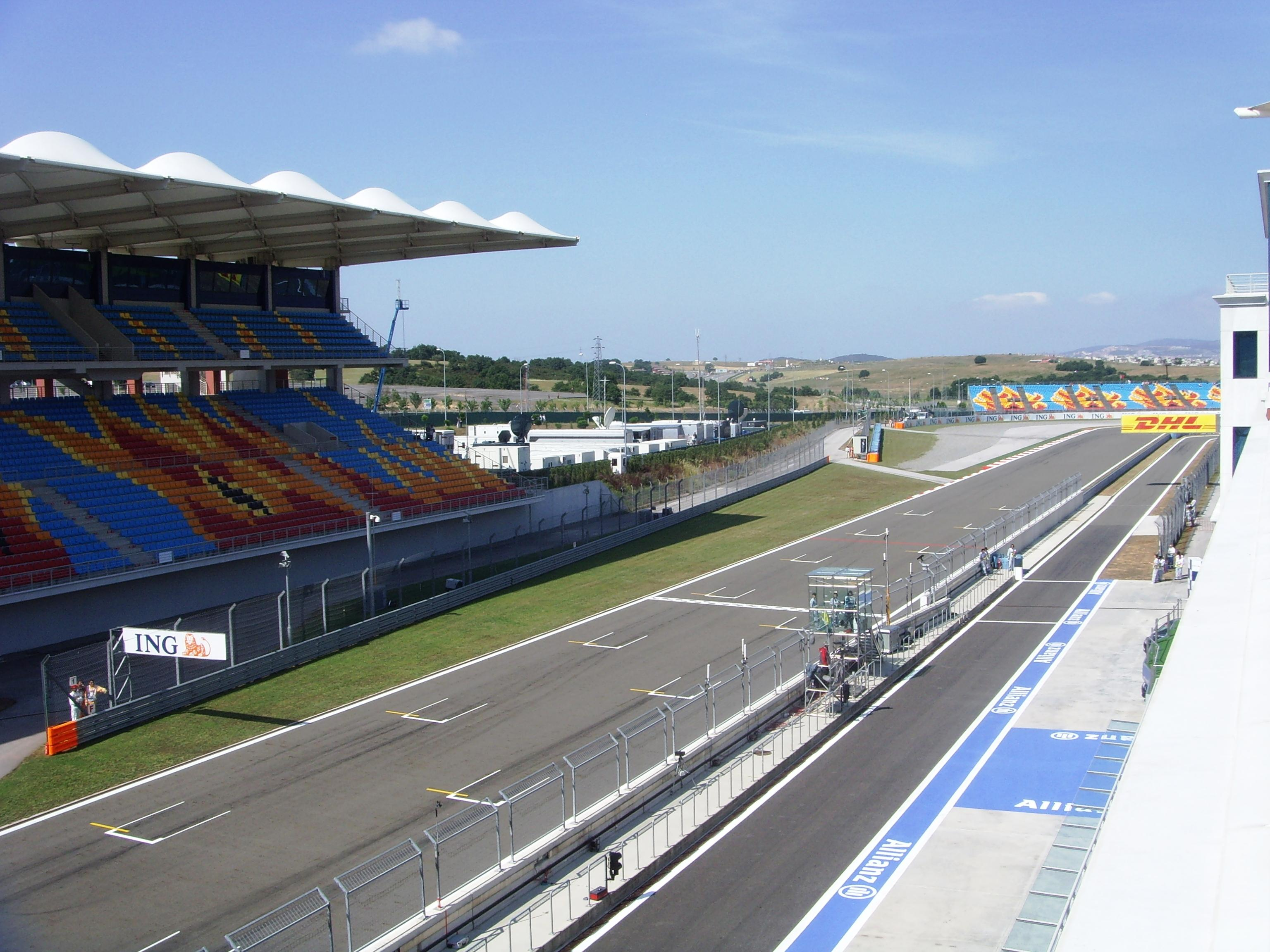
Istanbul Park hosted the Turkish Grand Prix each year between 2005 and 2011.

Since opening in 2005, Istanbul Park has hosted the annual Turkish Grand Prix. The 5.34-kilometer (3.32 mi) track was a stop on the World Touring Car Championship circuit and the European Le Mans Series in 2005 and 2006, but the track has not seen either of those competitions since then. The future of Istanbul Park remains uncertain, as financial issues caused the track to be dropped from the Turkish Grand Prix in 2012. Istanbul was also an occasional stop on the F1 Powerboat World Championship circuit, with the Championship's last appearance in the Bosphorus being in 2000.

Established in 1952, Istanbul Sailing Club (İstanbul Yelken Kulübü, İYK) is the primary organizer of Olympic class national and international sailing races in Istanbul and the Sea of Marmara; while yacht races are organized by the Open Seas Racing Club of Turkey (Türkiye Açıkdeniz Yarış Kulübü, TAYK) and by the Turkish Navy which organizes the annual Navy Cup Open Seas Yacht Race (Deniz Kuvvetleri Kupası Açık Deniz Yat Yarışı.) Personal, non-competitive yachting and sailing are also common on the Bosphorus and the Sea of Marmara, while rowing races periodically occur on the Golden Horn between the teams of the leading universities (including the Boğaziçi University, Koç University and Kadir Has University) and sports clubs in the city, namely Galatasaray, Fenerbahçe, and Beşiktaş. The airspace above the Golden Horn also hosted legs of the Red Bull Air Race World Championship in 2006 and 2007.

== See also ==
- LGBT culture in Istanbul
