= LGBTQ culture in Istanbul =

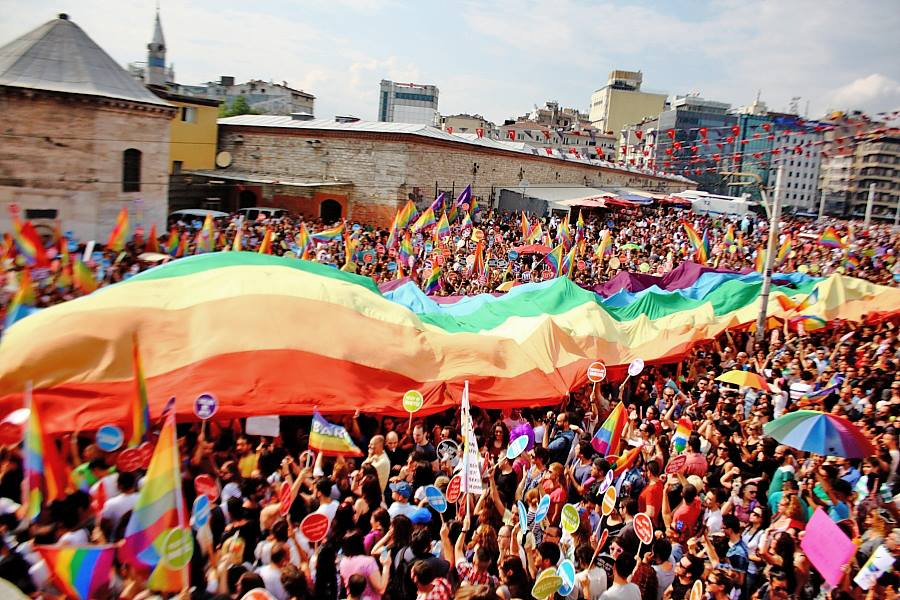
Istanbul Pride, Taksim Square, 2013

Istanbul is generally tolerant of LGBTQ people, at least compared to elsewhere in Turkey. Erin Cunningham of The Washington Post has called Istanbul "a hub for gay and transgender life", but also acknowledged, "outside of elite Turkish society and the trendy Istanbul quarters where homosexual and transgender Turks live somewhat comfortably, life remains difficult for the LGBT population". The city's Beyoğlu district has seen the LGBT community "[reach] a critical mass".

== History ==
Gender and sexual diversity has deep roots in the cultural fabric of Istanbul, dating back to the Ottoman era. Historical records indicate that gender-nonconforming individuals and same-sex relationships were part of public and court life, though their treatment varied across different periods and rulers. In elite Ottoman society, young male dancers known as "köçeks" performed in harems and public venues, often admired for their beauty and sometimes involved in erotic contexts.

Although Islamic jurisprudence formally prohibited same-sex acts, enforcement was inconsistent, and expressions of homoerotic desire appeared in classical Ottoman poetry and literature. Westernization movements in the 19th century brought increasing criminalization and stigmatization of queer identities, influenced by European legal codes.

In the Republican era, particularly after the 1980 military coup, LGBTQ individuals in Istanbul faced systemic oppression, including police raids and arrests. However, the 1990s marked the beginning of organized LGBTQ activism in Istanbul, with groups such as Lambda Istanbul emerging to assert visibility and legal rights.

== Events ==
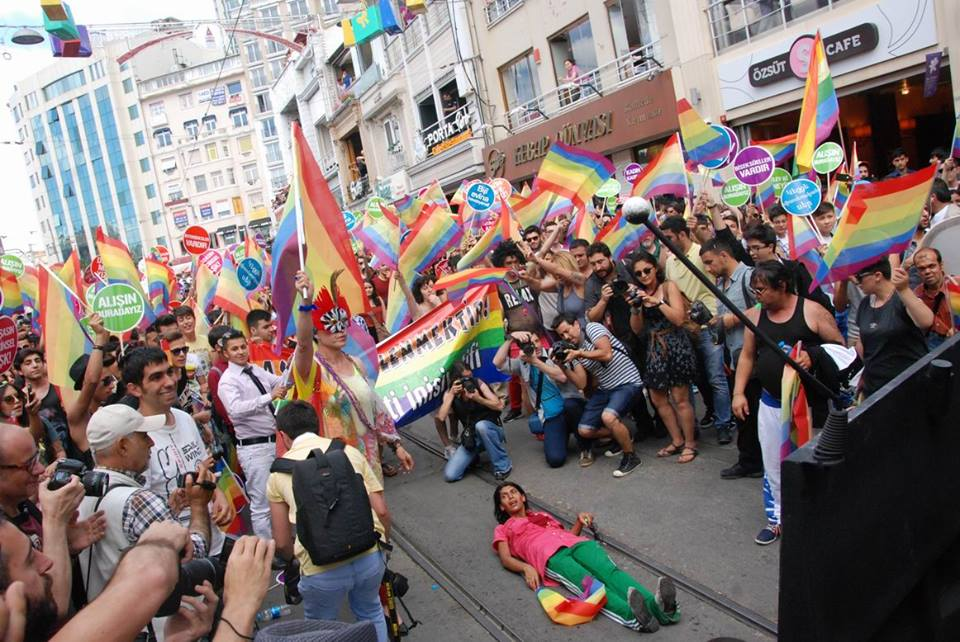
Istanbul Pride, 2014

Istanbul Pride has been organized since 2003. The 2009 event saw approximately 3,000 march participants, and the 2013 and 2014 events were among the largest LGBT celebrations in a majority-Muslim country, attracting approximately 100,000 participants. According to The New York Times, "since 2014, the authorities have banned Pride parades in major cities, including in Istanbul, where crowds in the tens of thousands used to participate". Police used tear gas and water cannons on Istanbul Pride participants in 2015. Authorities said the ban was because of "security and public concerns". Bans continued through 2019, and the 2020 event was cancelled because of the COVID-19 pandemic. Police detained approximately 300 attendees at Pride events in 2022. In 2023, a few hundred people defied the ban, organizing a march in Nişantaşı.

In 2016, several dozen transgender rights activists gathered in Istanbul in defiance of a march ban. Boğaziçi University has seen LGBT protests. In 2023, after police blocked access to Taksim Square and İstiklal Avenue (spaces traditionally used by Istanbul Pride), hundreds of people gathered in the Şişli district's Mistik Park.

The Queer Olympix is an annual sports event organized by activists since 2017. Activities have included association football, dodgeball, and volleyball. The group faced a police ban in 2019 for using "queer" in an event title. The group has encountered some difficulties organizing activities; according to NPR, "the owners of some fields refuse to rent to them, and when they're able to hold the games, they do so in near-total secrecy and without online promotion".

=== Anti-LGBT demonstrations ===
In 2022, an anti-LGBT march was organized in Istanbul. The Big Family Gathering's slogan was "Protect Your Family and Generation, Stop Perversion". The demonstration was the largest of its kind in Turkey, attracting several thousand participants, and Kürşat Mican said organizers had collected approximately 150,000 signatures "to demand a new law from Turkey's parliament that would ban what they called LGBTQ propaganda, which they say pervades Netflix, social media, arts and sports". Ahead of the event, organizers circulated a video using images from past Pride events in Turkey. This was criticized by LGBTQ associations and other rights groups; Istanbul Pride organizers asked the governor's office to ban the event and for authorities to remove the video, deeming both "hateful".

== Businesses and organizations ==
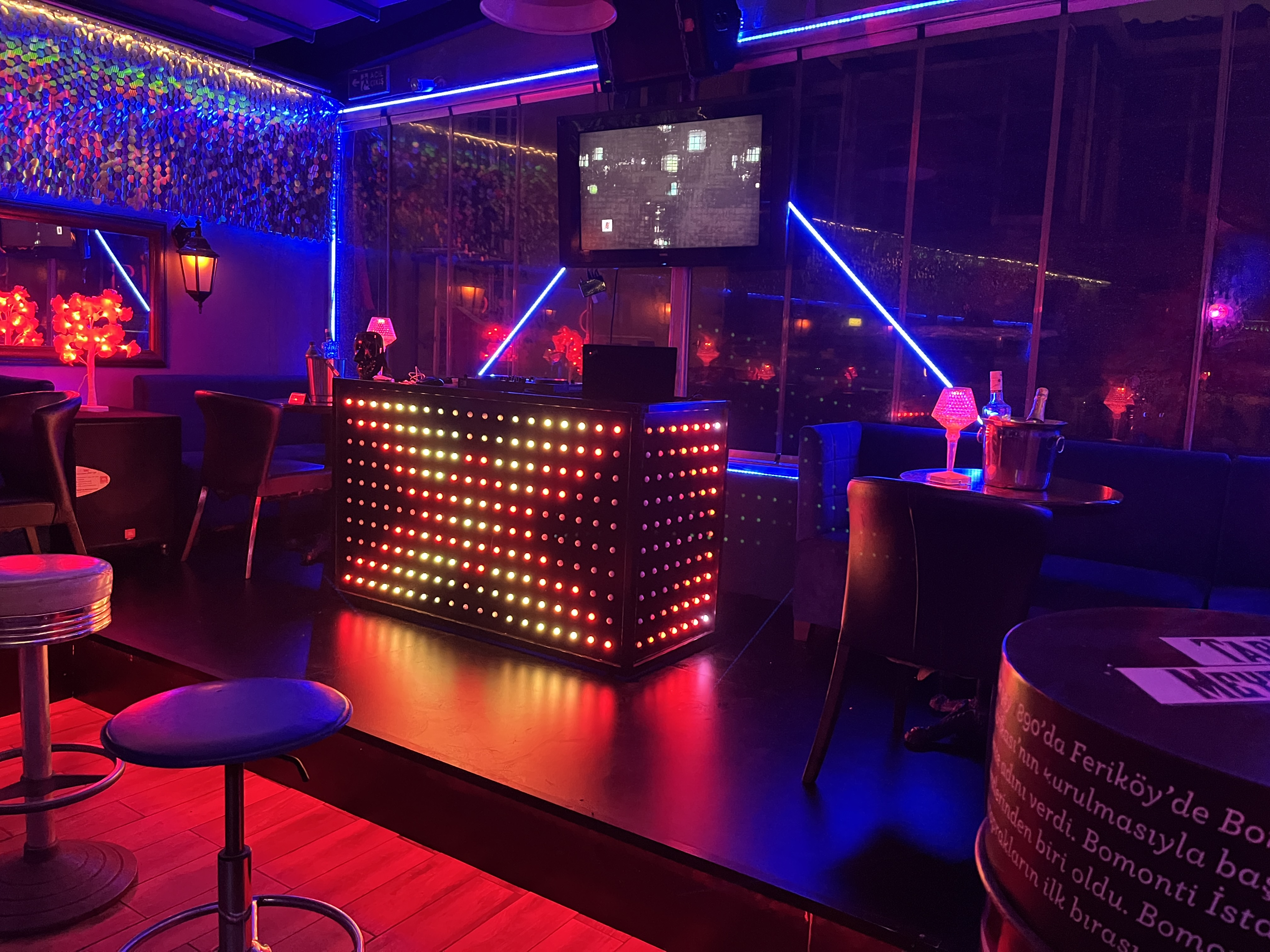
Interior of the LGBT-friendly Pinokyo Bar, 2023

According to USA Today, the city's gay bars and clubs are concentrated in Taksim Square and Beyoğlu: "As in most major cities, gay establishments come and go. A majority of Istanbul's establishments cater to men, but a few offer an all-lesbian or mixed atmosphere." Xtra Magazine has said, "In the many gay clubs and bars to be found around the Taksim/Beyoglu area you'll likely feel quite at home... That said, people in public places tend not to kiss on the mouth, or hold hands, especially outside the gay neighborhoods."

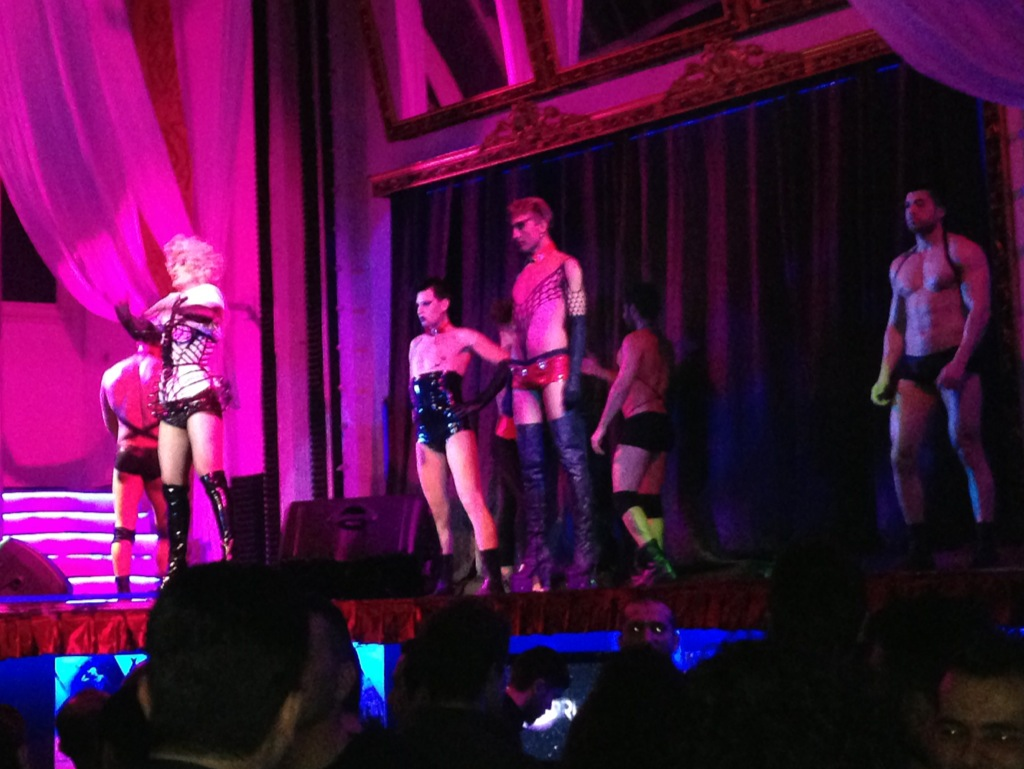
XLarge Club, 2013

Among accommodations approved by the International LGBTQ+ Travel Association are Grand Hyatt Istanbul, Kumru Hotel, and Park Hyatt Istanbul. Firuz Ağa Hamamı is popular with gay men and bears.

The Istanbul LGBTI+ Solidarity Association works to advance transgender rights. In 2022, the nongovernmental LGBTQ advocacy and outreach organization Social Policy, Gender Identity and Sexual Orientation Studies Association (SPoD) reportedly stopped posting their addresses online after receiving threatening calls.

Istanbul hosts a variety of organizations and businesses that support and serve the local LGBTQ community.

Lambda Istanbul, founded in 1993, is one of Turkey’s oldest LGBTQ+ rights organizations. It provides legal assistance, organizes community events, and advocates for LGBTQ+ rights nationally. The organization played a central role in organizing the Istanbul Pride marches until 2015, when official bans were introduced.

SPoD (Social Policies, Gender Identity and Sexual Orientation Studies Association), based in Istanbul, works to promote equality through legal advocacy, social services, and mental health support. It also conducts training with municipalities to improve inclusion of LGBTQ individuals in public services.

Kaos GL, while headquartered in Ankara, frequently collaborates with Istanbul-based activists and organizations. It produces annual reports on hate crimes and discrimination and has hosted national queer conferences, including events held in Istanbul.

Other community spaces include Şişli Queer House, a queer-friendly co-living and cultural venue, and The Queer Art Collective Istanbul, which hosts exhibitions and performance art centered on LGBTQ+ themes. Events like KuirFest, originally founded in Ankara, have also made regular stops in Istanbul, contributing to the cultural landscape despite increasing legal restrictions on public LGBTQ+ gatherings.

== Art and film ==
In 2023, Kaya Genç of ArtReview wrote:

Since 2014, when Erdoğan became president, verbal and physical violence against LGBTQ communities has slowly risen and Pride and Trans marches have been banned. Last year, Turkey's president branded Turkey's queer communities 'deviants' who threaten Turkey's 'family structure'. He promised to 'tackle' the LGBTQ 'issue' for good. In response, many NGOs collaborated with and supported LGBTQ causes... Not so Istanbul's sleek art institutions and museums, many of which are partly funded by the government. While local bars and clothing brands added rainbow symbols to their social media avatars to express solidarity, Istanbul's major art institutions have remained silent on LGBTQ rights for years.

In 2021, four students in Istanbul were arrested over an artwork "that reportedly combined LGBT symbols with an image of an Islamic site". According to BBC News, "protesters hung an artwork opposite the new rector's office depicting the Kaaba in Mecca, one of Islam's holiest sites, and images of the LGBT rainbow flag". Authorities accused the students of "inciting hatred" and Interior Minister Suleyman Soylu called them "LGBT deviants" on Twitter. The social networking service flagged the post for violating its "rules about hateful conduct", but kept it accessible "for public-interest reasons". For Pride Month in 2023, DEPO was the city's only major artistic venue to host a queer exhibition, and the Pera Museum's film department curated a program. DEPO's Resurgence in Fragments showcased works by Okyanus Çağrı Çamcı, Üzüm Derin Solak, and Furkan Öztekin, and featured pride flags. Among queer films screened at the Pera Museum's Who Wouldn’t Want a Better Story? were Peter Strickland's The Duke of Burgundy (2014), Isabel Sandoval's A Common Language (2020), and Tsai Ming-liang's Days (2020).

== LGBTQ+ celebrities and public figures ==
Among the most known is Zeki Müren, a classically trained singer and actor whose flamboyant style and gender-fluid presentation challenged norms in mid-20th-century Turkey. Despite never publicly labelling his sexuality, Müren is widely regarded as a queer icon and remains a beloved figure in Turkish popular culture.

Bülent Ersoy, a transgender singer and actress who transitioned in the 1980s. Despite facing a performance ban under military rule following her gender-affirming surgery, she later regained public acceptance and continues to appear on mainstream television. Ersoy's enduring popularity have made her one of the most prominent transgender celebrities in the Muslim world.

Çağla Akalın, Turkey’s first openly transgender beauty queen and human rights advocate, gained widespread attention.

Drag performers such as Hazar Ergüçlü and Vazgeçtim, prominent figures in Istanbul’s queer nightlife and art scenes, use performance art to challenge societal norms and promote acceptance.

Actor and model Burak Deniz is known for his advocacy on LGBTQ+ issues in Turkish media, helping to normalize queer identities in mainstream television dramas.

Mabel Matiz, is a Turkish pop singer-songwriter and LGBTQ+ rights activist. He has openly discussed his sexuality and has been a vocal advocate for LGBTQ+ rights in Turkey. His music often reflects themes of love and identity, resonating with many in the LGBTQ+ community.

== Crime and safety ==
According to a report submitted to the United Nations, local rights groups documented approximately 40 "hate murders" against LGBT people between 2010 and 2014.

== See also ==
- Culture of Istanbul
- Gender and sexual minorities in the Ottoman Empire
- Lambda Istanbul
- LGBTQ history in Turkey
- LGBTQ people and Islam
- LGBTQ rights in Turkey
- Rainbow stairs
