= Column of the Goths =

Roman triumphal column in Constantinople (Istanbul, Turkey)

Coordinates: 41°0′52.2″N 28°59′7.6″E

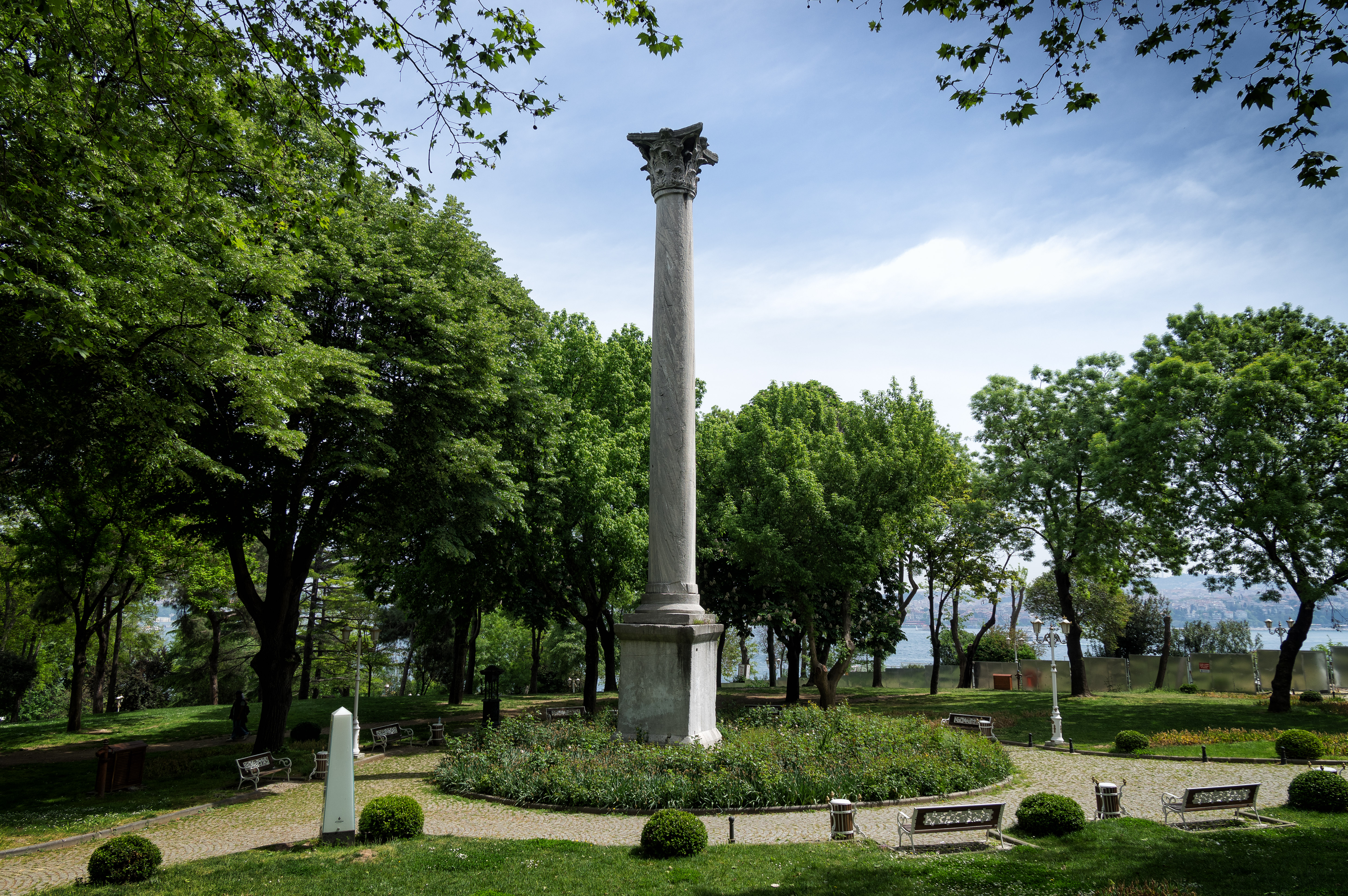
- The column in Gülhane Park, 2017

- Location within Istanbul
- Location: Column of the Goths in Gülhane Park, Istanbul, Turkey.

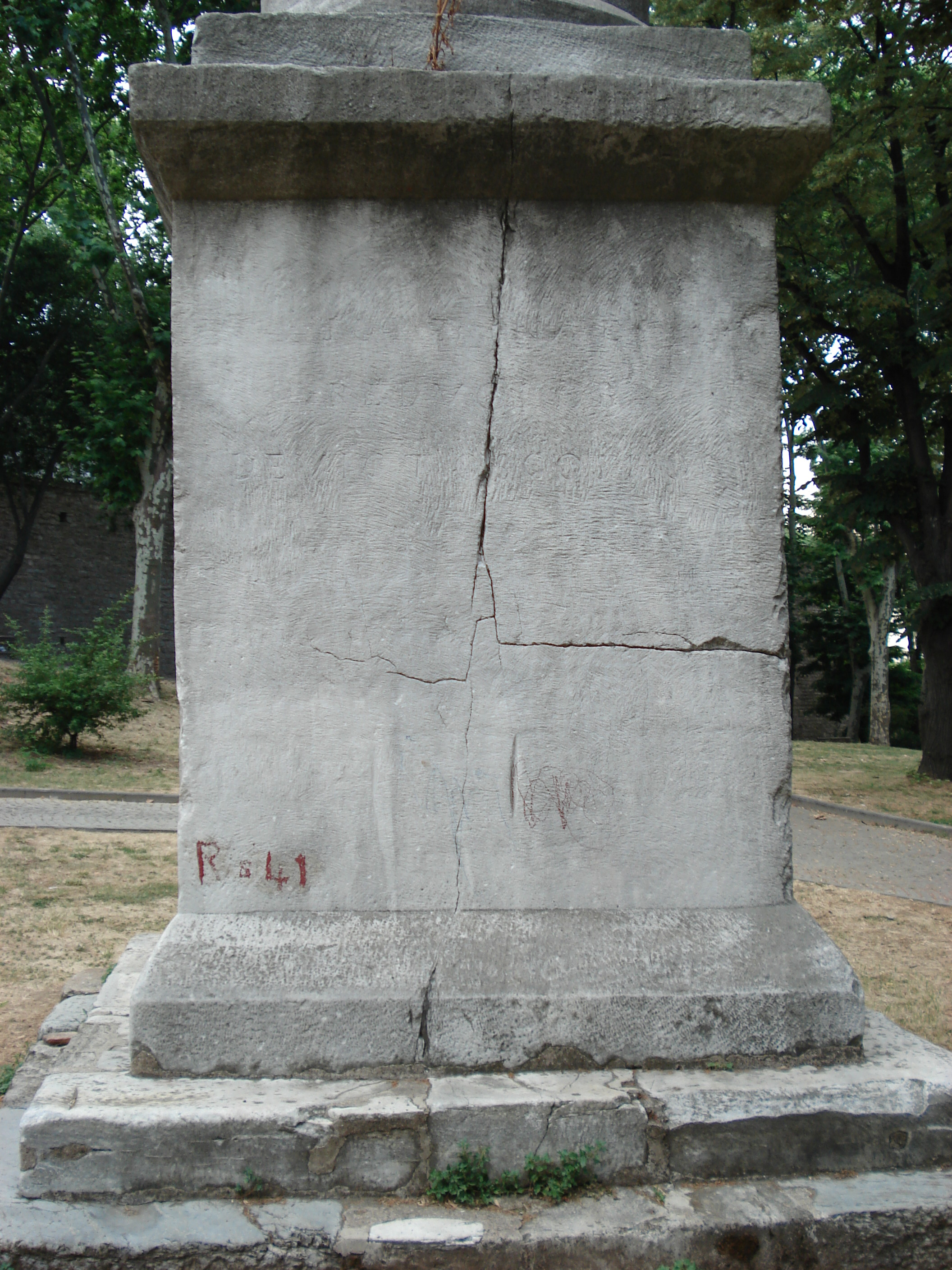
The inscription on the column's plinth is now virtually illegible.

The Column of the Goths (Turkish: Gotlar Sütunu) is a Roman victory column dating to the third or fourth century A.D. It stands in what is now Gülhane Park, Istanbul, Turkey.

== History ==
The name of the 18.5 metre high free-standing Proconnesian marble pillar which is surmounted with a Corinthian capital derives from a Latin inscription at its base, commemorating a Roman victory over the invading Goths: FORTVNAE REDVCI OB DEVICTOS GOTHOS ("To Fortuna, who returns by reason of victory over the Goths"), which has been shown to have replaced an earlier Latin inscription. The dating and original dedication of the column are uncertain.

Most likely, the column was erected to honor the victories of either Claudius II Gothicus (r. 268-270) or Constantine the Great (r. 306-337), both of whom are noted for achieving victories over the Goths. According to Byzantine historian Nicephorus Gregoras (c. 1295-1360), the column was once surmounted by a statue to Byzas the Megarian, the semi-legendary founder of Byzantium. A notice on location states “6th century historian Ionnes of Lydia mentions that the column head carried the sculpture of Tyche …” and suggests ".. a pagan goddess, it might have been removed following the approval of Christianity as the official religion.” It then quotes the (much later) Nikephoros Gregoras and the Byzas statue.

At any rate, it represents the oldest monument of the Roman era still extant in the city, possibly going back to the city's history as Byzantium and preceding its refoundation as Constantinople.

== See also ==
- List of public art in Istanbul

== Sources ==
- Mango, Cyril (2000). "The Triumphal Way of Constantinople and the Golden Gate" (PDF). Dumbarton Oaks Papers. 54: 173–188. doi:10.2307/1291838. JSTOR 1291838. Archived from the original (PDF) on 2010-06-13.
