= Istanbul Museum of the History of Science and Technology in Islam =

Museum in Istanbul, Turkey

- İstanbul İslam Bilim ve Teknoloji Tarihi Müzesi
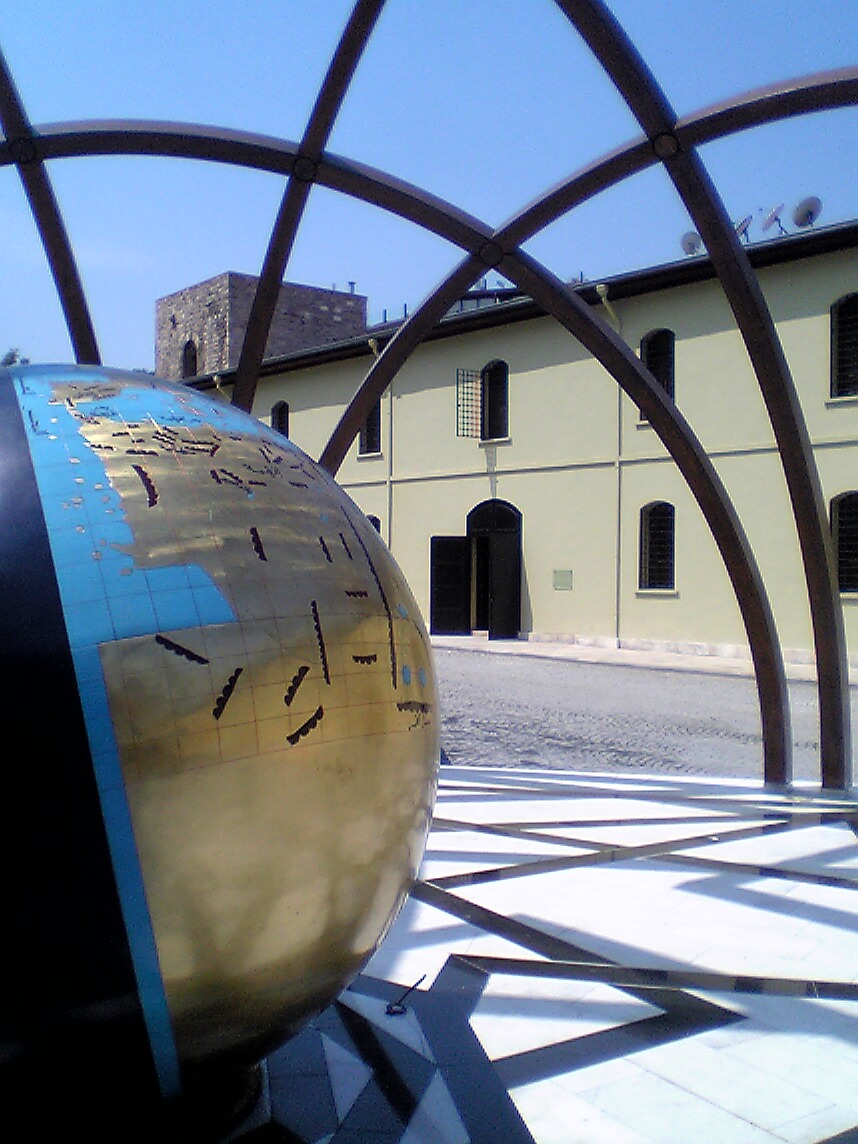
- Established: 25 May 2008
- Location: Istanbul, Turkey
- Coordinates: 41.013847°N 28.979562°E
- Type: museum
- Website: http://muze.gov.tr

Istanbul Museum of the History of Science and Technology in Islam (Turkish: İstanbul İslam Bilim ve Teknoloji Tarihi Müzesi) is located in the former Imperial Stables Building in Gülhane Park. The museum was opened on 25 May 2008 and displays replicas of 9th and 16th century scientific instruments of Muslim scholars. The models were all made at the Institute for the History of Arab-Islamic Sciences of the Johann Wolfgang Goethe University in Frankfurt from descriptions and drawings in contemporary texts - very few original items are present. Many items are "completely imagined", while others are based on drawings of similar-looking devices in manuscripts, but it is unknown if these were ever built, or intended to be built.

== Gallery ==
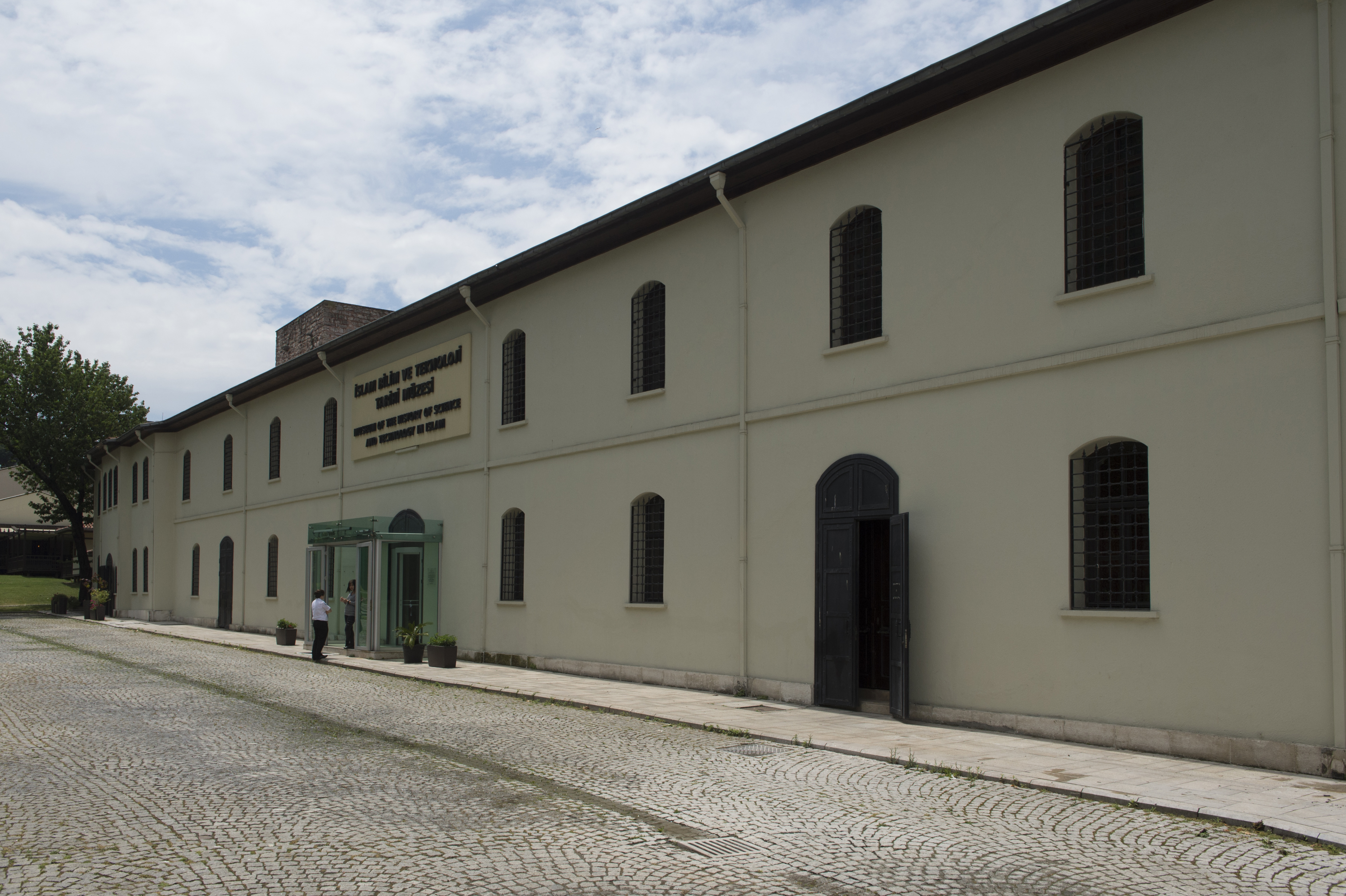
Museum of the History of Science and Technology in Islam Front

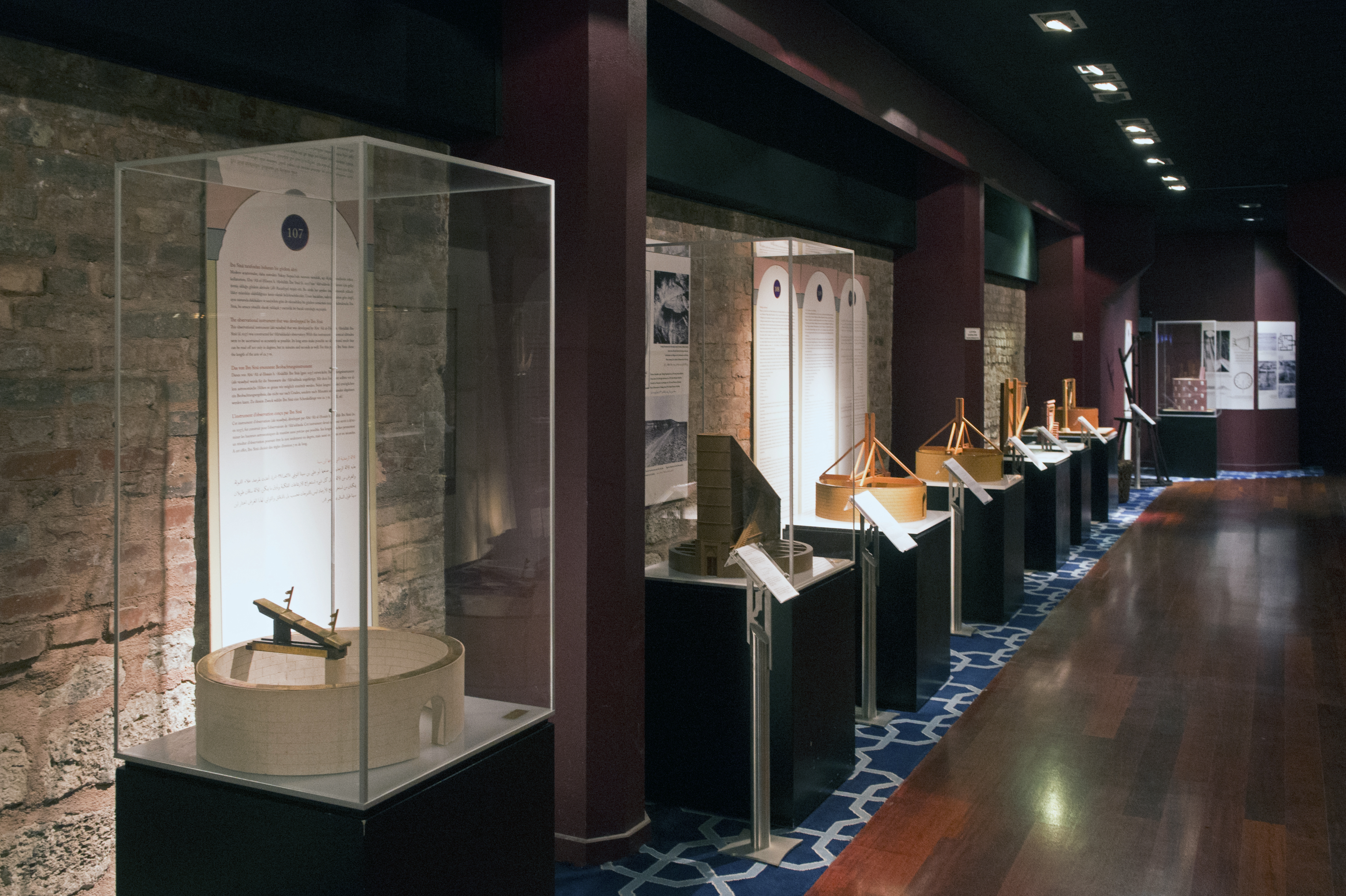
Istanbul Museum of the History of Science and Technology in Islam Astolabe collection

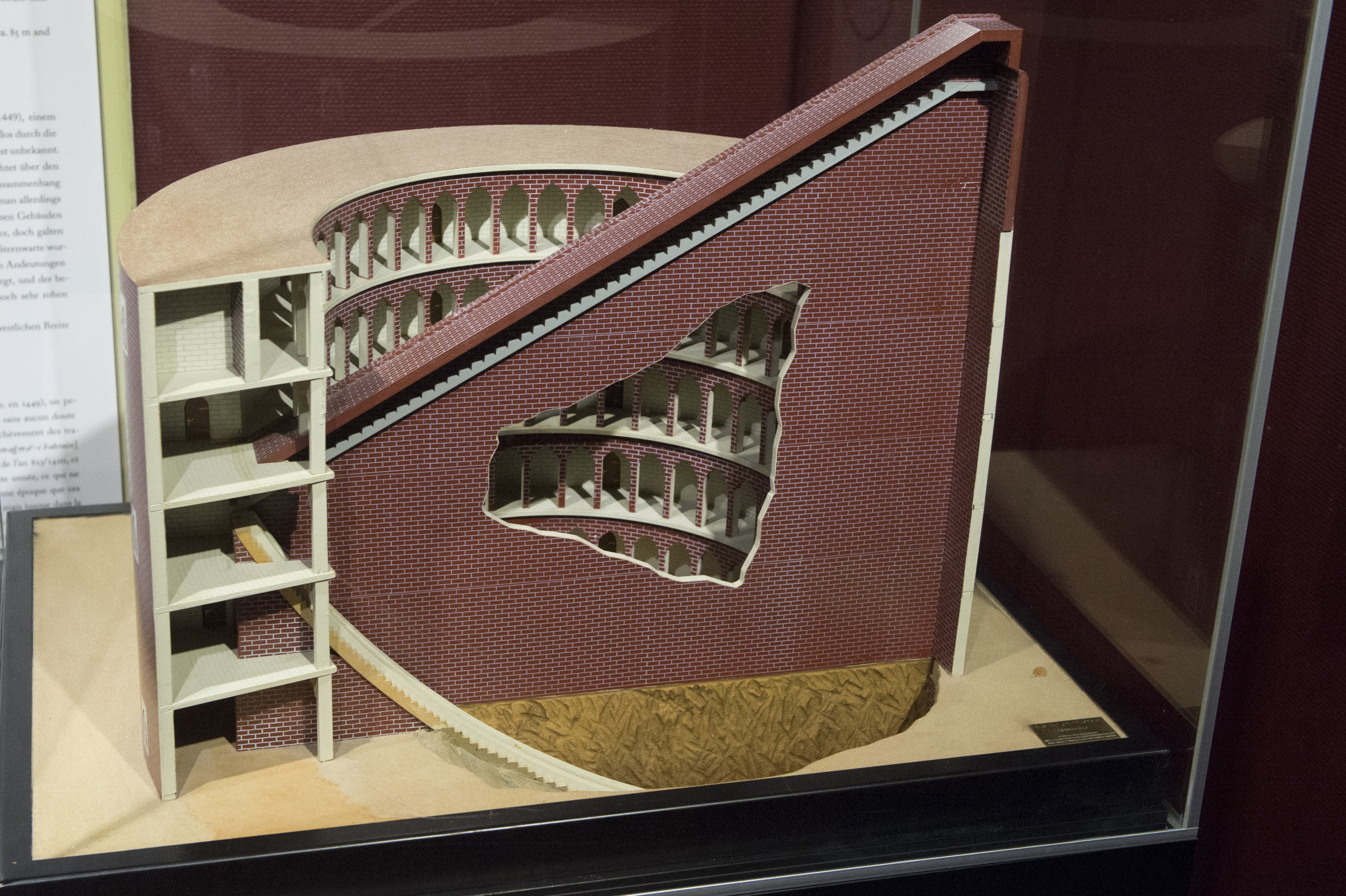
Museum of the History of Science and Technology in Islam Observatory

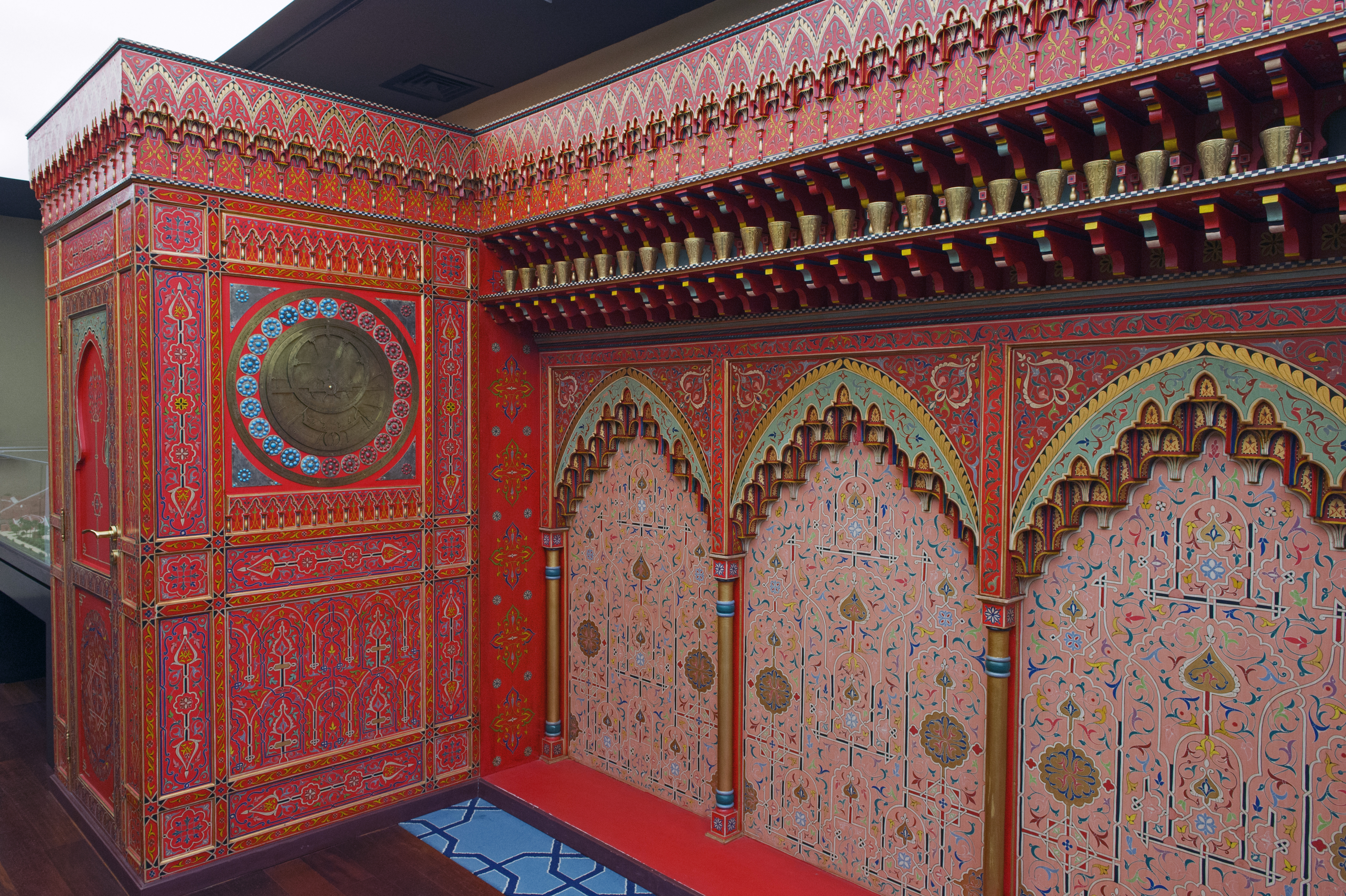
Museum of the History of Science and Technology in Islam clock

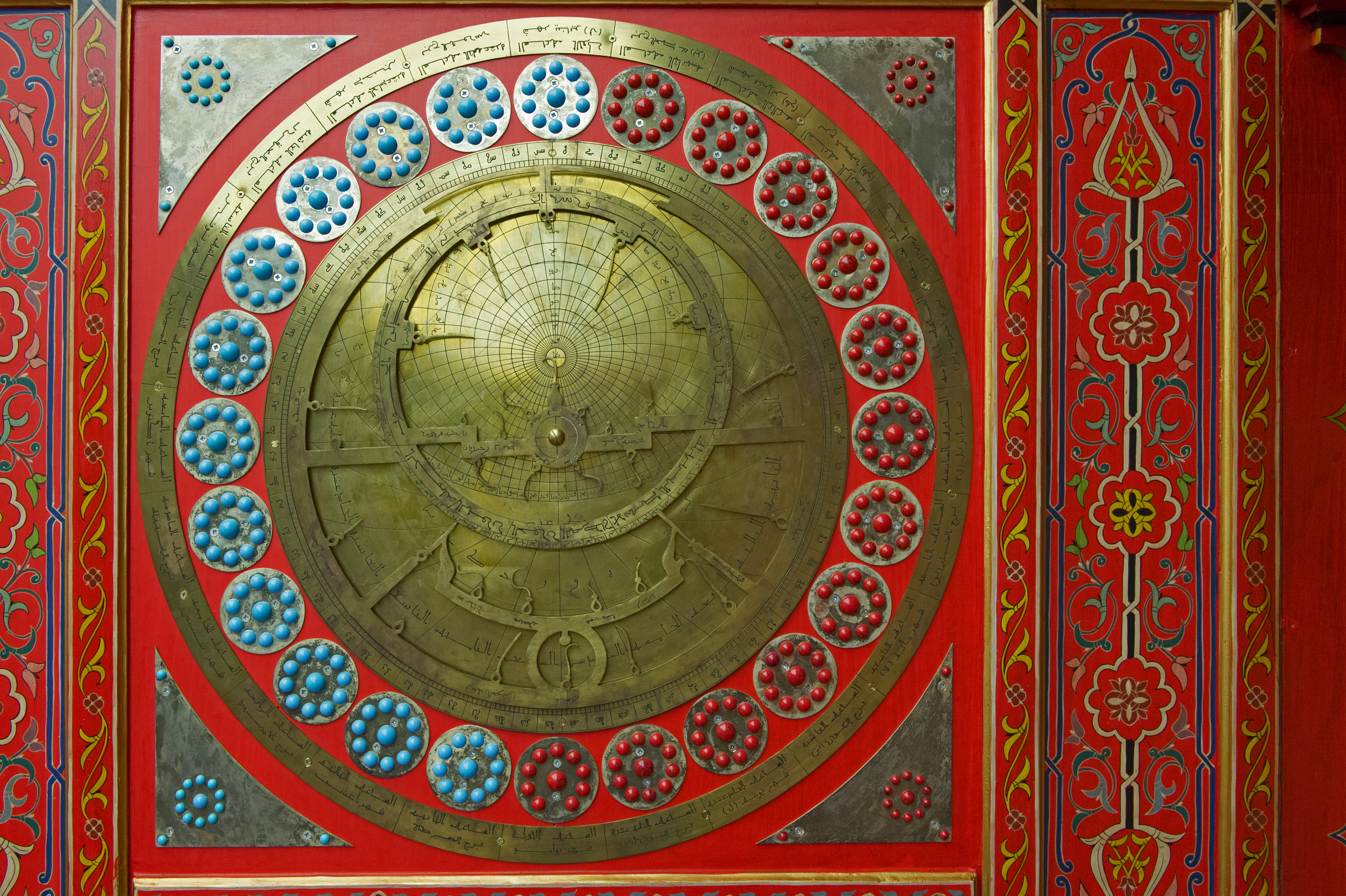
Museum of the History of Science and Technology in Islam Clock detail

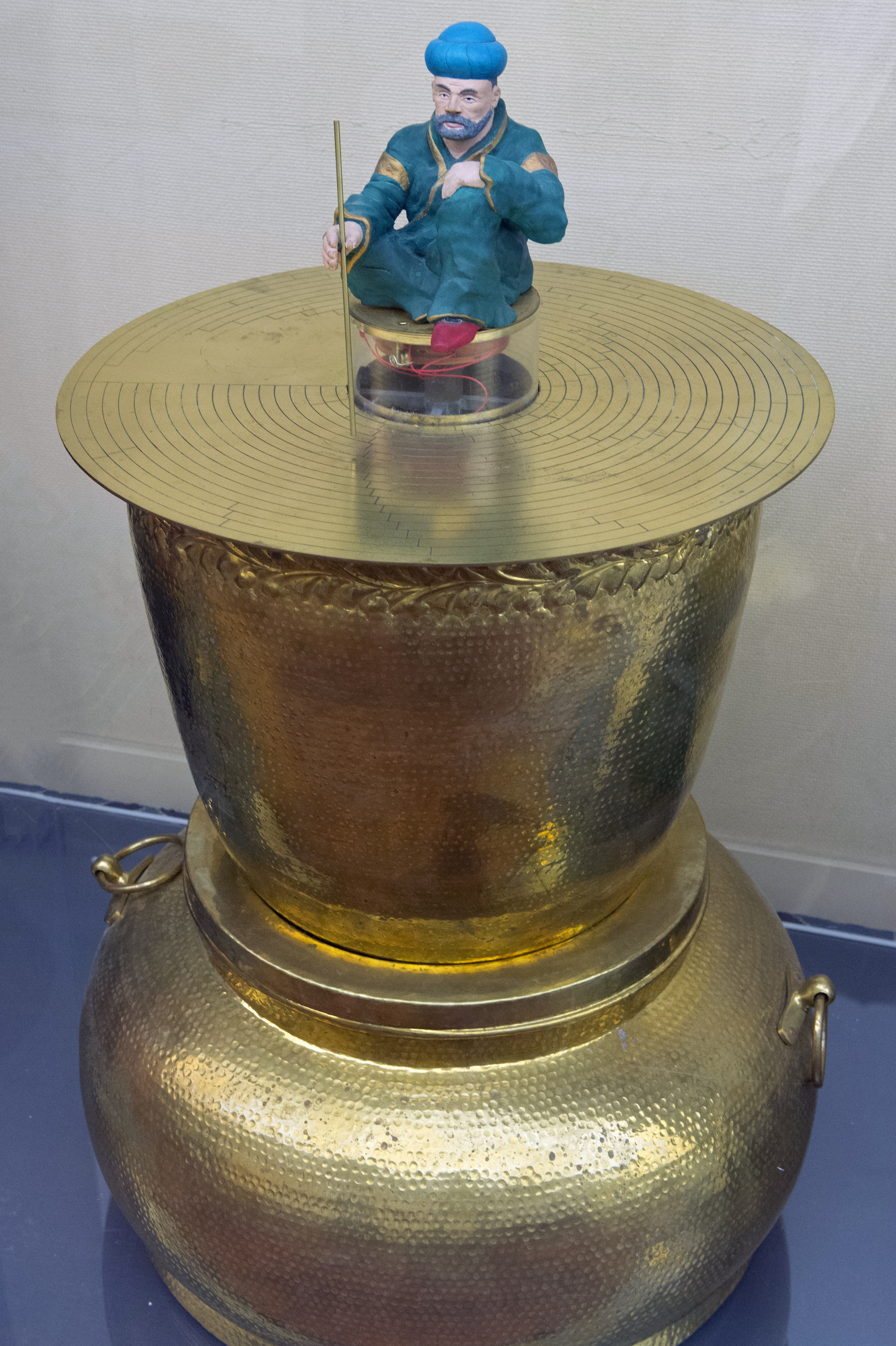
Museum of the History of Science and Technology in Islam Water clock

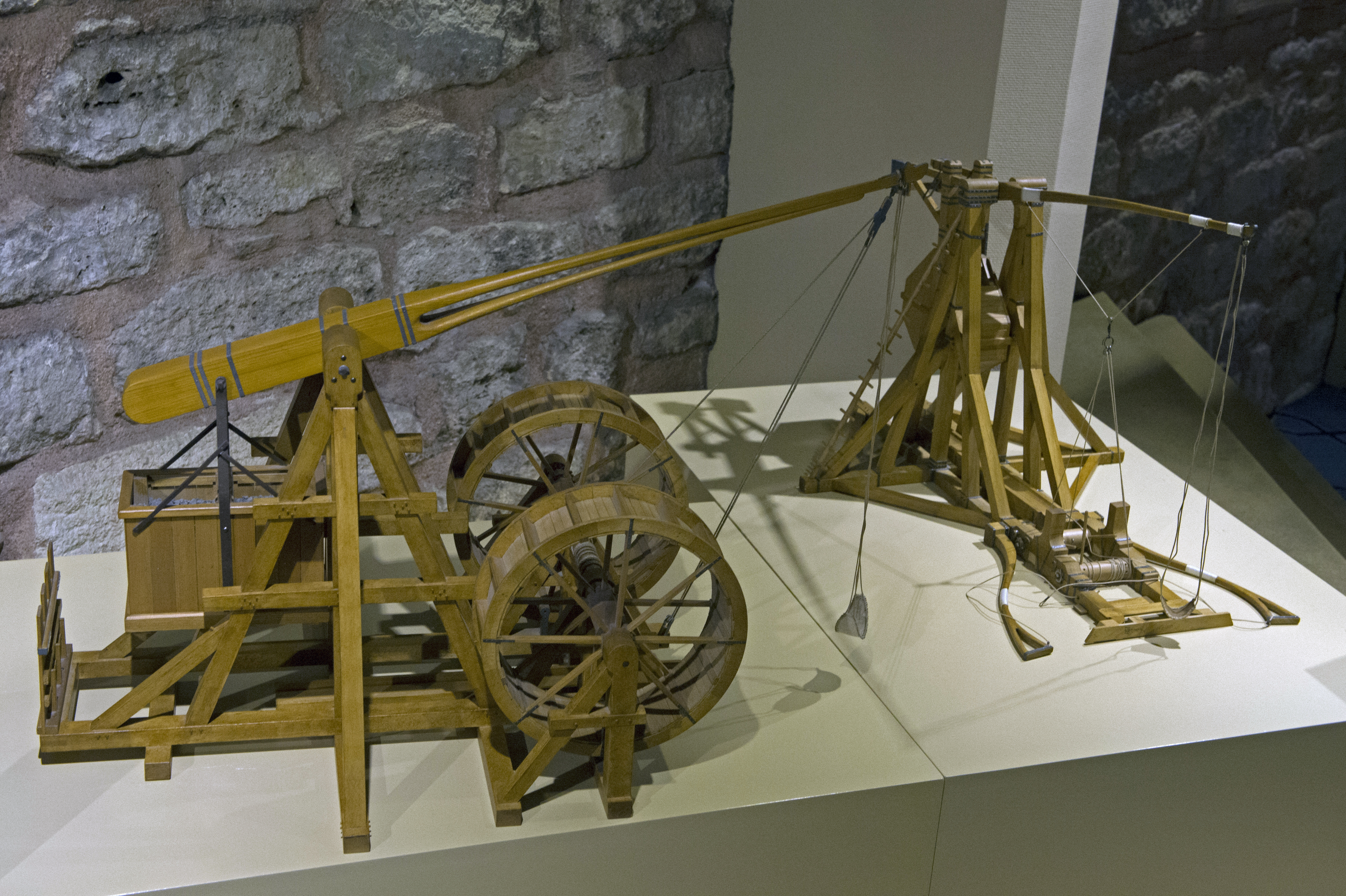
Museum of the History of Science and Technology in Islam Military objects

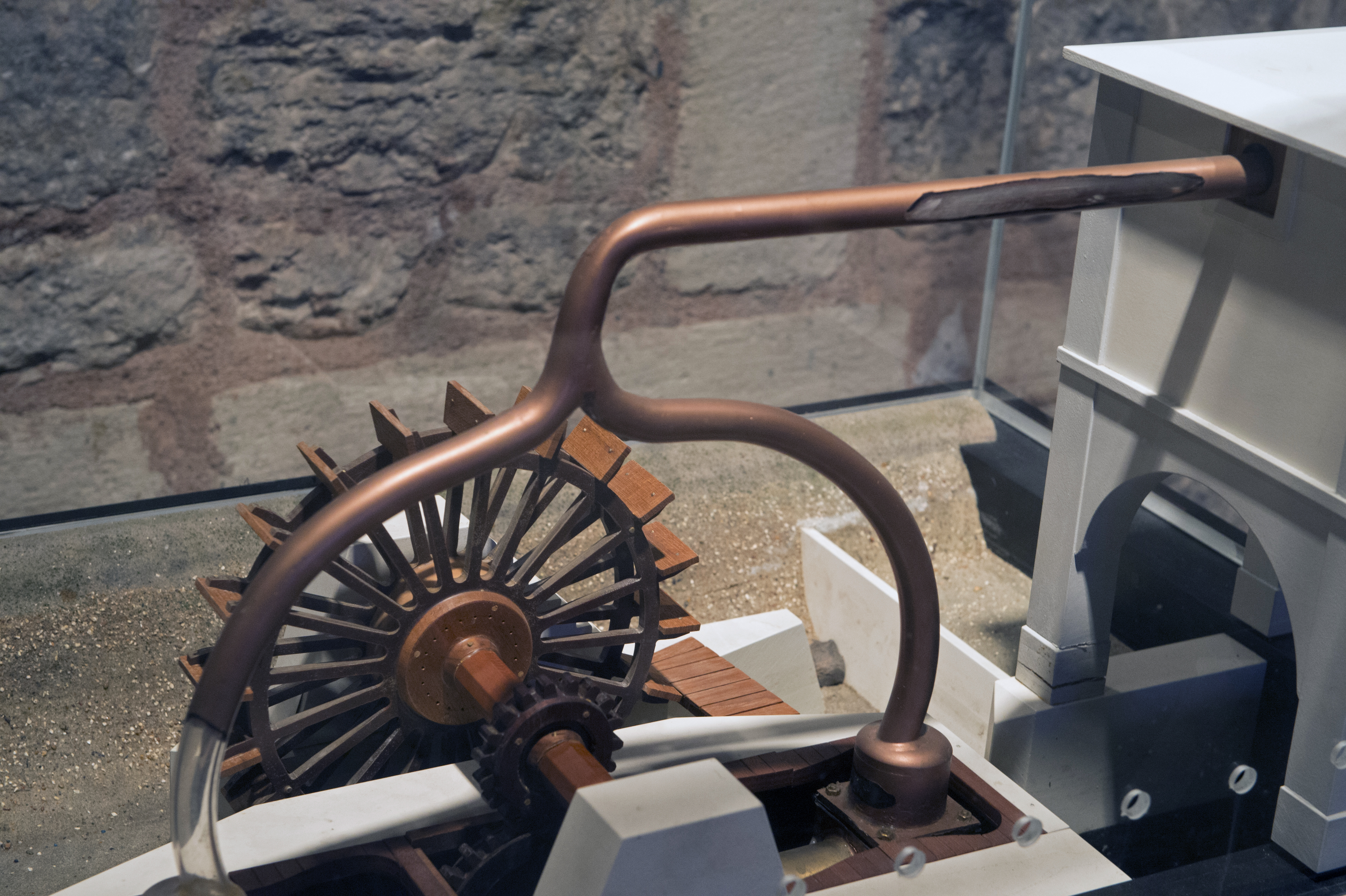
Museum of the History of Science and Technology in Islam Pump

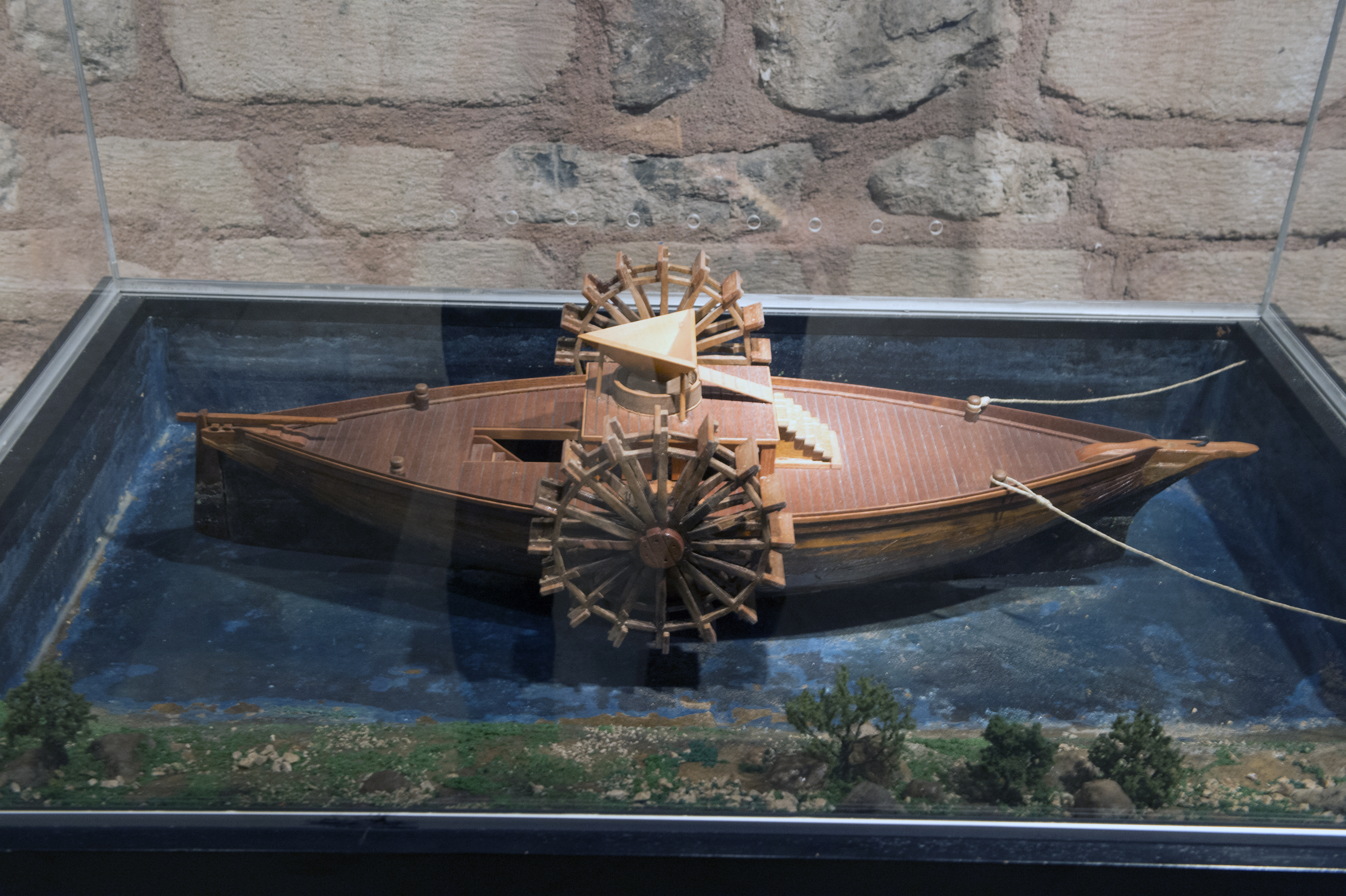
Museum of the History of Science and Technology in Islam Mill

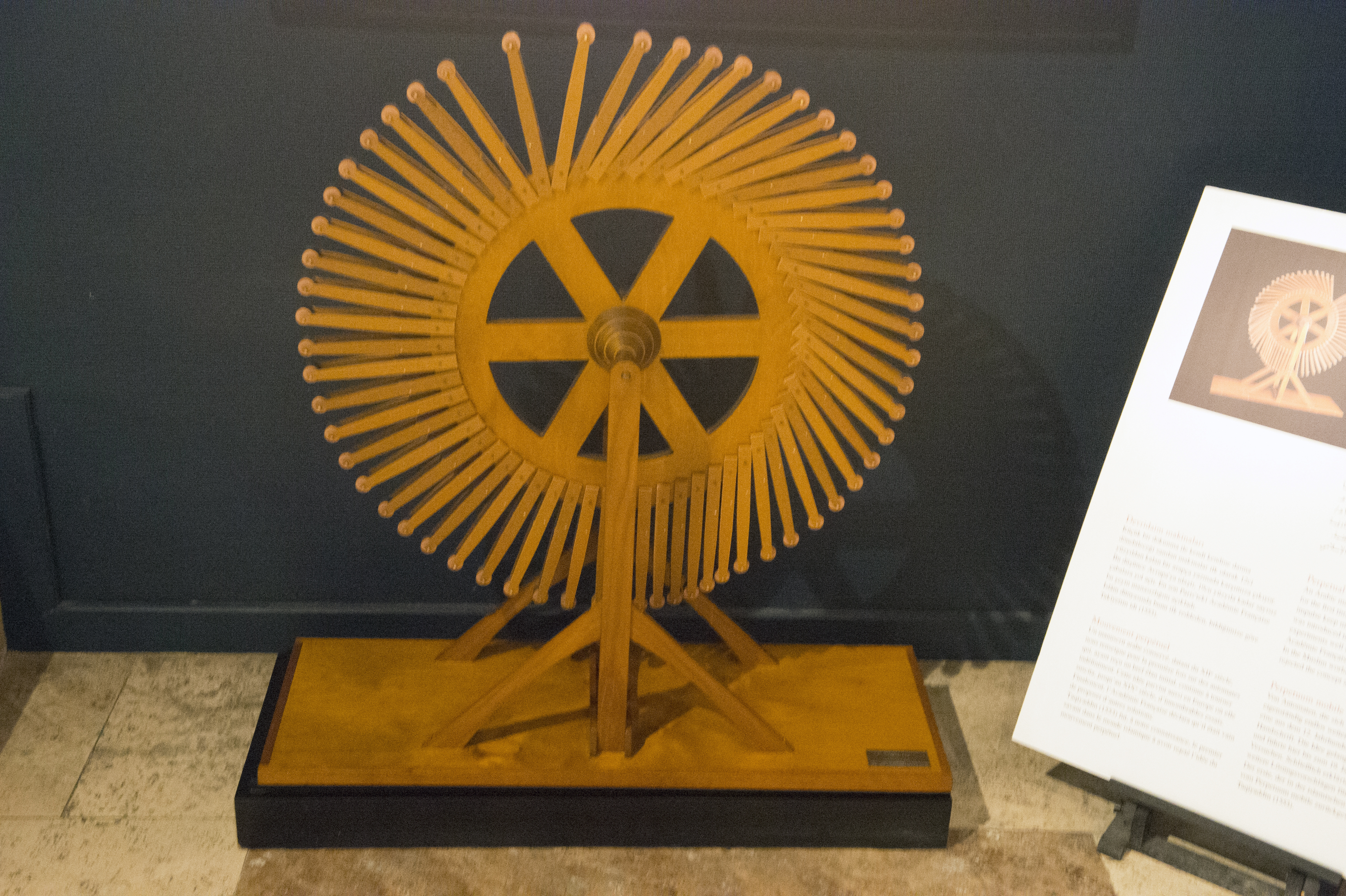
Museum of the History of Science and Technology in Islam Perpetuum mobile

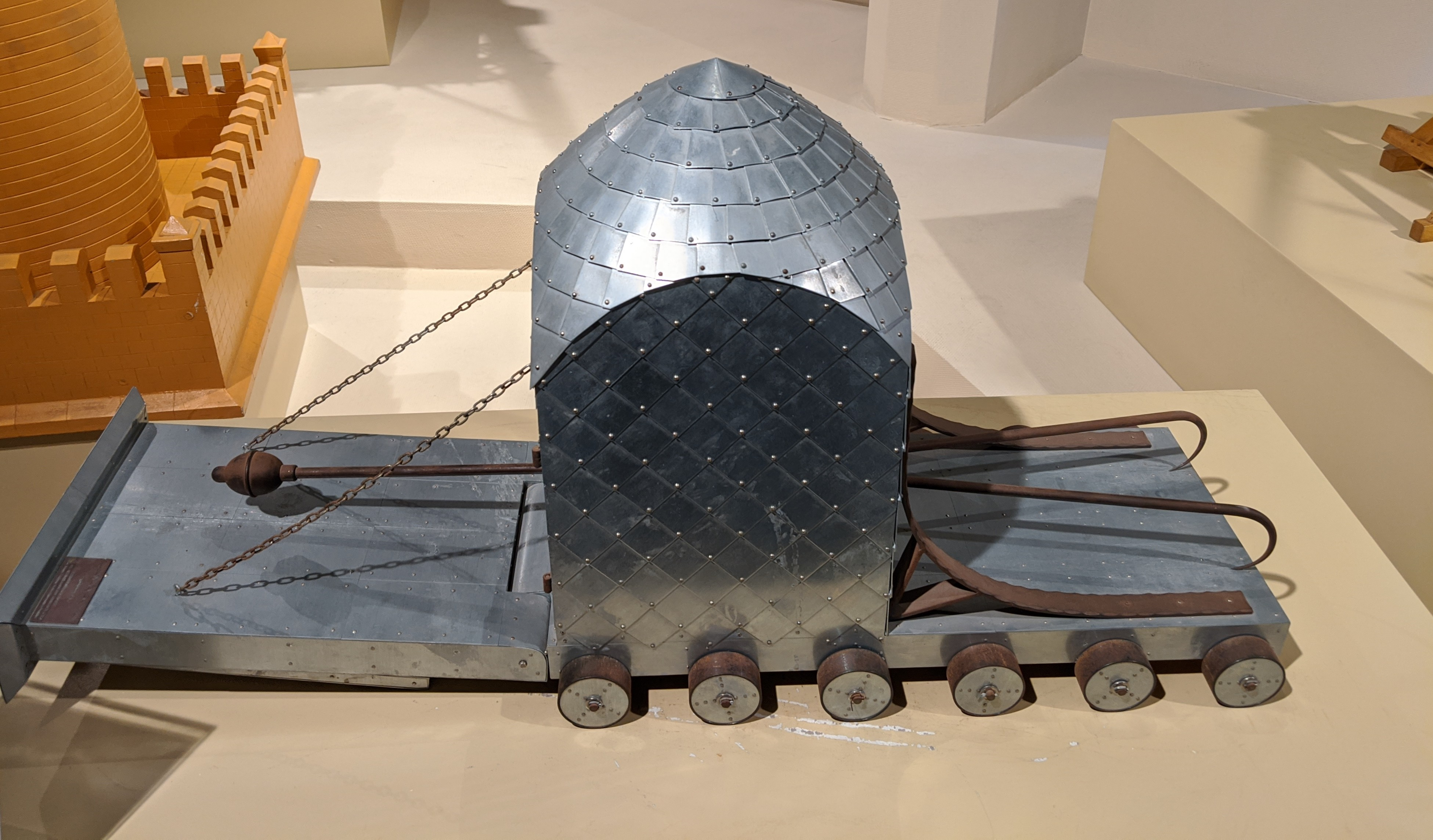
Museum of the History of Science and Technology in Islam Armored battering ram
