= Rainbow stairs =

Colorful staircase in Istanbul, Turkey

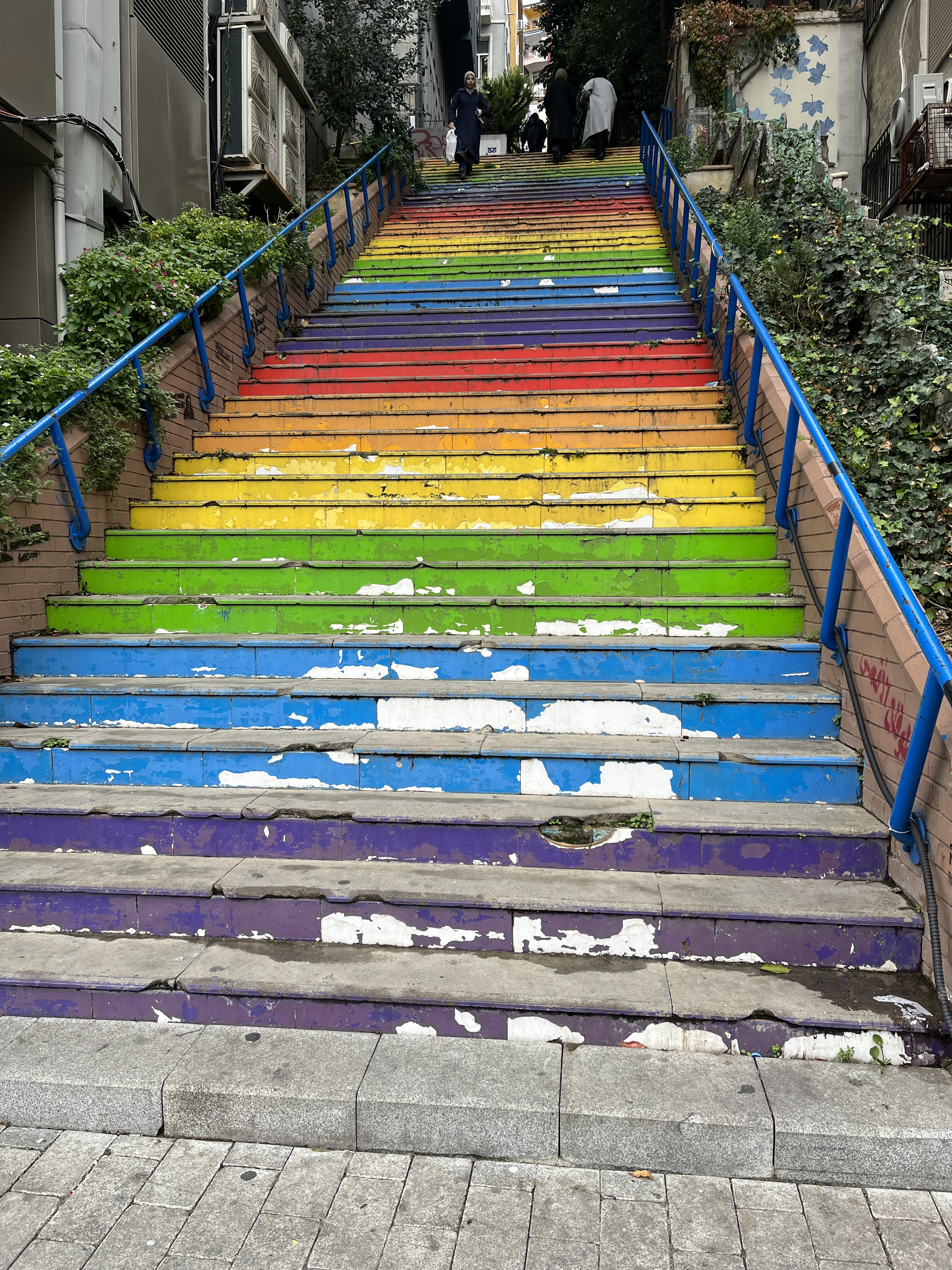
- The staircase in 2023
- Location: Istanbul, Turkey
- Location within Istanbul
- Coordinates: 41.0291°N 28.9864°E

The "rainbow stairs" (or sometimes "rainbow steps") refer to a rainbow-painted staircase in Beyoğlu, in Istanbul, Turkey.

== History ==
Huseyin Cetinel, a retired forestry engineer, originally painted a rainbow on the Salıpazarı ramp connecting the Fındıklı/Karaköy and Cihangir neighborhoods in 2013. He spent a week painting the rainbow with his son-in-law. Days later, the staircase was painted grey, prompting activists to re-paint the rainbow there as well as others throughout the city. Activism was not the artist's intent, but the steps became popular with the LGBT community and tourists. The staircase was destroyed as part of a demolition project in 2015, and repainted.

== See also ==
- LGBTQ culture in Istanbul
- Rainbow flag (LGBTQ)
- Rainbow crossing
- Rainbows in culture
