= Mahmutpasha Bazaar, Istanbul =

Shopping street in Istanbul, Turkey

Coordinates: 41°00′40″N 28°58′11″E

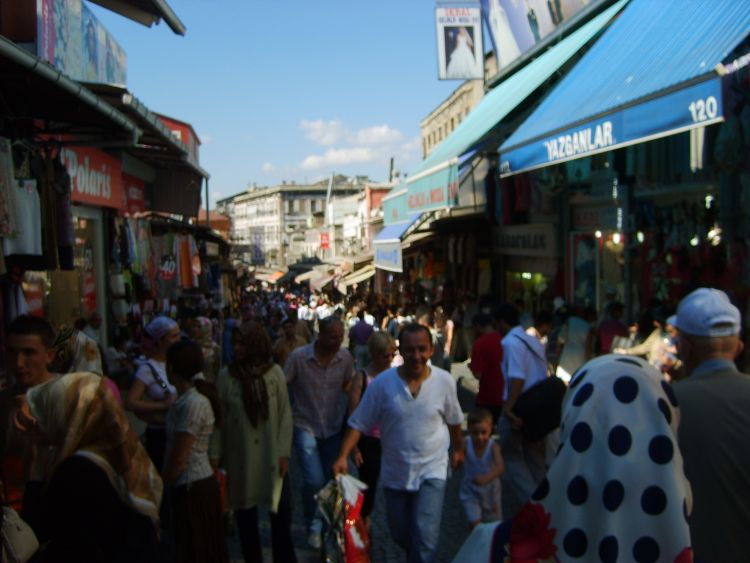
Mahmutpaşa Bazaar

Mahmutpasha Bazaar (Turkish: Mahmutpaşa Çarşısı) is a shopping street in Istanbul, Turkey. It is located in the area between Grand Bazaar and Eminönü in the Mahmutpaşa neighbourhood of Fatih district. This market area, with copious small shops on both sides of the main street, is a symbol of cheap shopping in Istanbul. The bazaar hosts 256 shops.

== History ==
The bazaar gets its name from the street, named after the nearby Mahmut Pasha Mosque: this was commissioned by the Ottoman Grand Vizier Mahmud Pasha (d. 1474) during the rule of Sultan Mehmed II in 1462. The mosque complex also contains a hamam, a türbe, sebils and fountains.

== See also ==
- Bazaar
- Bazaari
- List of shopping malls in Istanbul
- Market (place)
- Retail

== Sources ==
- Müller-Wiener, Wolfgang (1977). Bildlexikon zur Topographie Istanbuls: Byzantion, Konstantinupolis, Istanbul bis zum Beginn d. 17 Jh (in German). Tübingen: Wasmuth. ISBN 9783803010223.
