= Gülhane Park =

Park in Istanbul, Turkey

- Gülhane Parkı
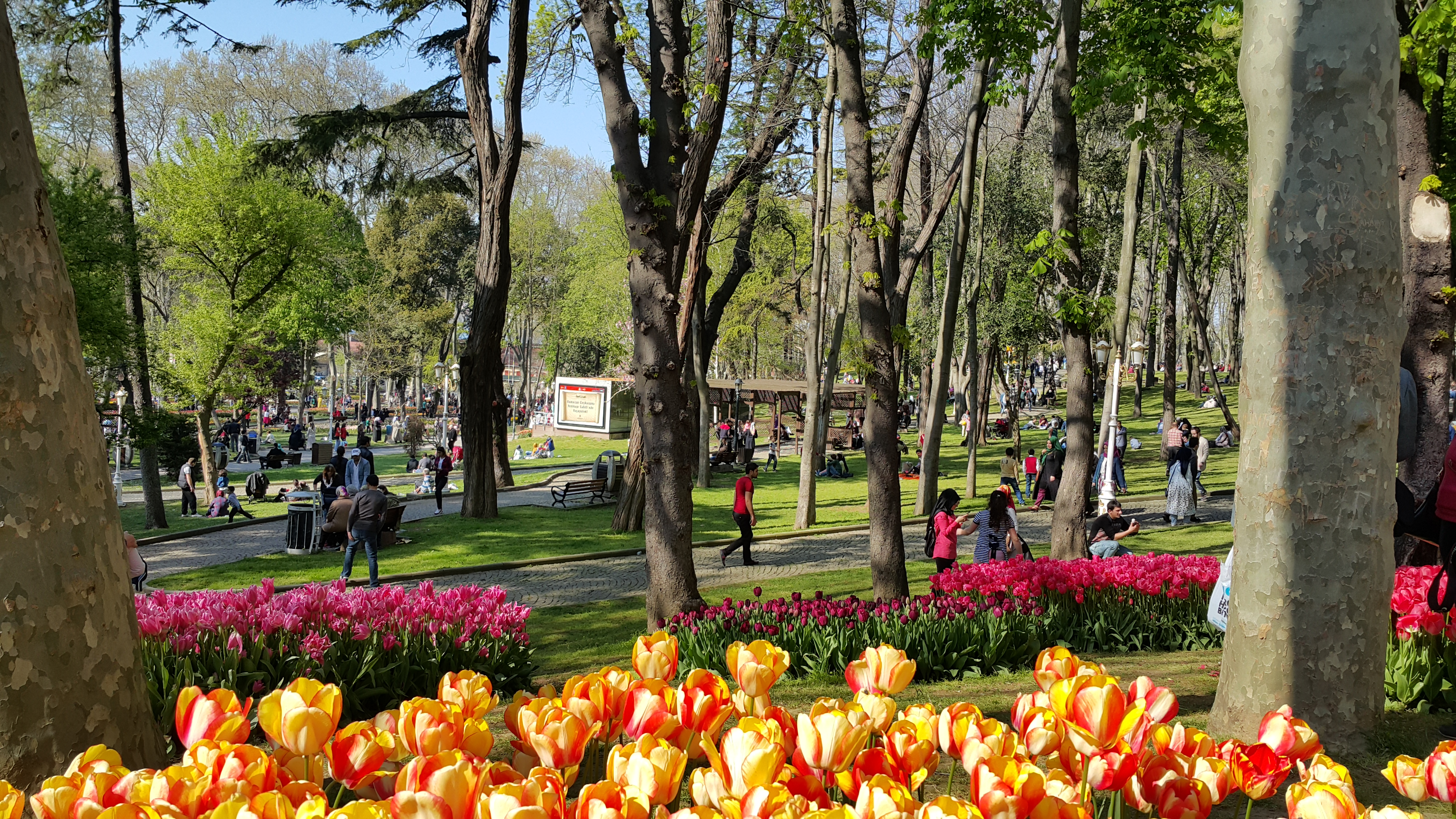
- Interactive map of Gülhane Park
- Location: Istanbul, Turkey
- Coordinates: 41.0127°N 28.9805°E
- Area: 23.97 acres (9.70 ha; 0.03745 mi^{2}; 0.0970 km^{2})
- Created: 1912; 114 years ago

Gülhane Park (Turkish: Gülhane Parkı, "Rosehouse Park") is a historical urban park in the Fatih district of Istanbul, Turkey; it covers an area of 9.7 ha, is adjacent to and on the grounds of the Topkapı Palace. The south entrance of the park sports one of the larger gates of the palace. It is the oldest and one of the most expansive public parks in Istanbul.

== History ==
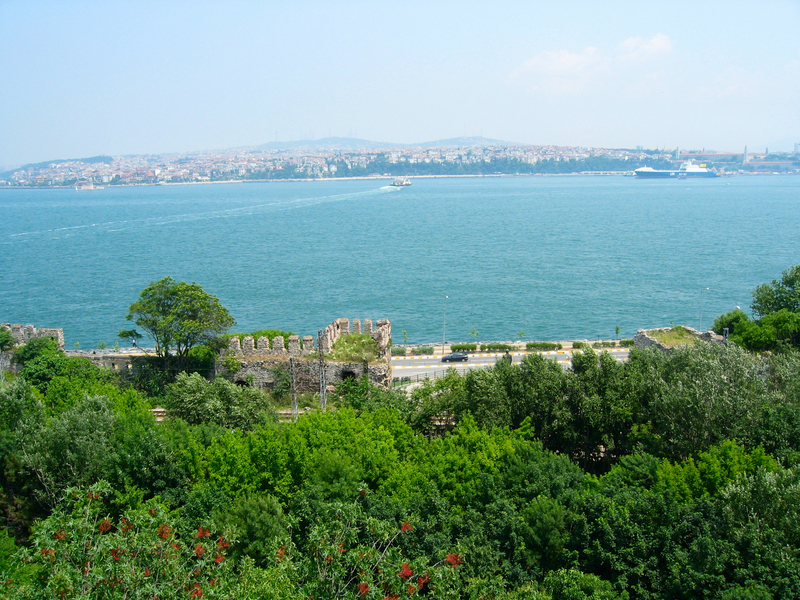
Gülhane Park as seen from the Topkapı Palace

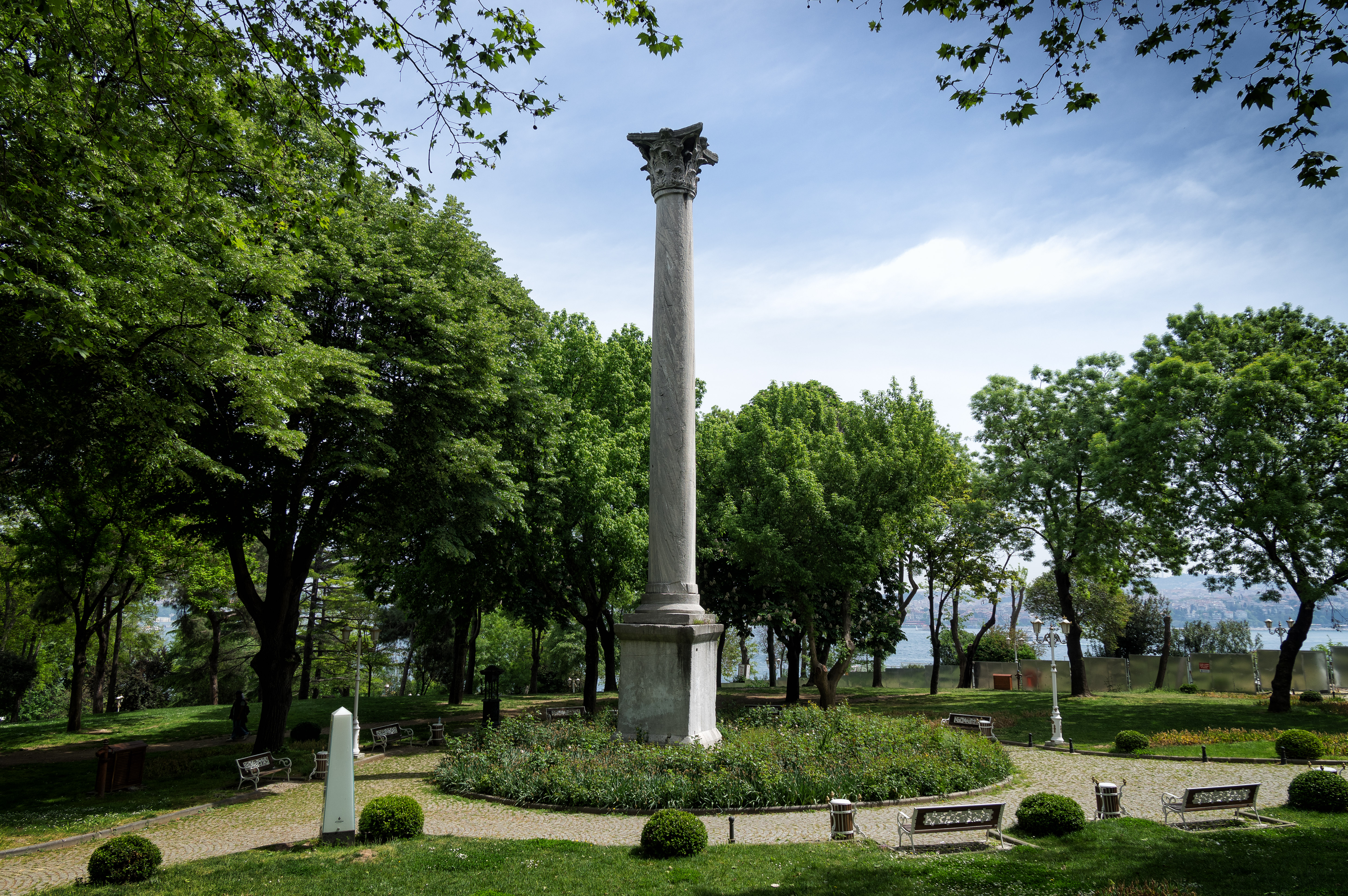
The park's Column of the Goths

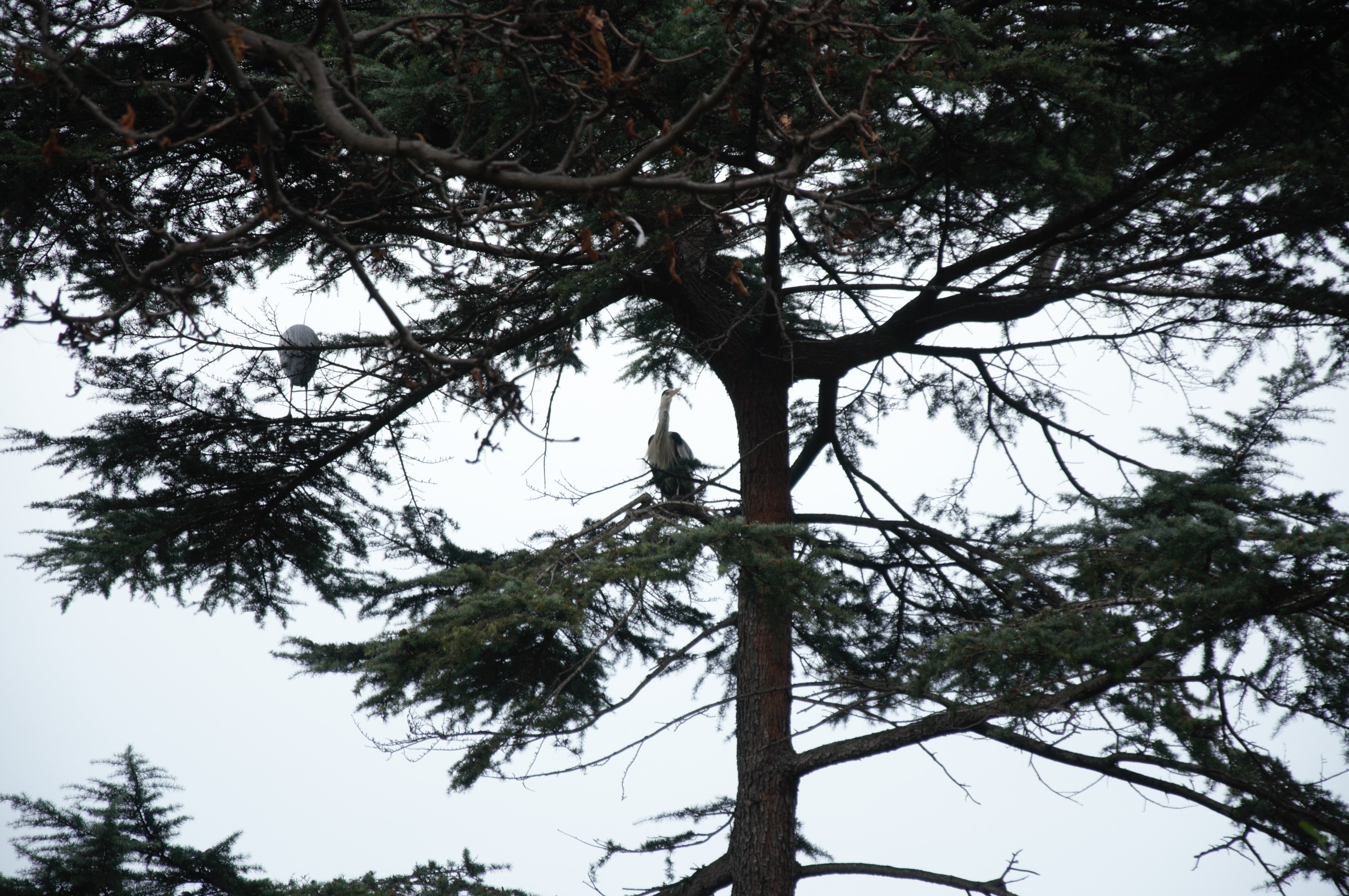
Two grey herons in Gülhane Park

The namesake of the park, the Gülhane (English: Rosehouse) present on the grounds, was the place where the 1839 Edict of Gülhane (Turkish: Tanzimât Fermanı or Gülhane Hatt-ı Şerif-î) was proclaimed. The edict launched the Tanzimat reforms in the Ottoman Empire, which modernized the empire and included changes such as the equalization of all Ottoman citizens, regardless of religion, before the law. The proclamation was made by Grand Vizier Mustafa Reşid Pasha, a leading statesman, diplomat, and reformer in the Empire.

Gülhane Park was once part of the outer garden of Topkapı Palace, and mainly consisted of a grove. A section of the outer garden was planned as a park by the municipality and opened to the public in 1912. The park previously contained recreation areas, coffee houses, playgrounds etc. Later, a small zoo was opened within the park.

During the bombing of Istanbul, the area was affected by the British bombs in 1918.

The park underwent a major renovation in recent years; the removal of the zoo, fun fair and picnic grounds effecting an increase in open space. The excursion routes were re-arranged and the big pool was renovated in a modern style. With concrete structures removed, the park regained the natural landscape of the 1950s, revealing trees dating from the 1800s.

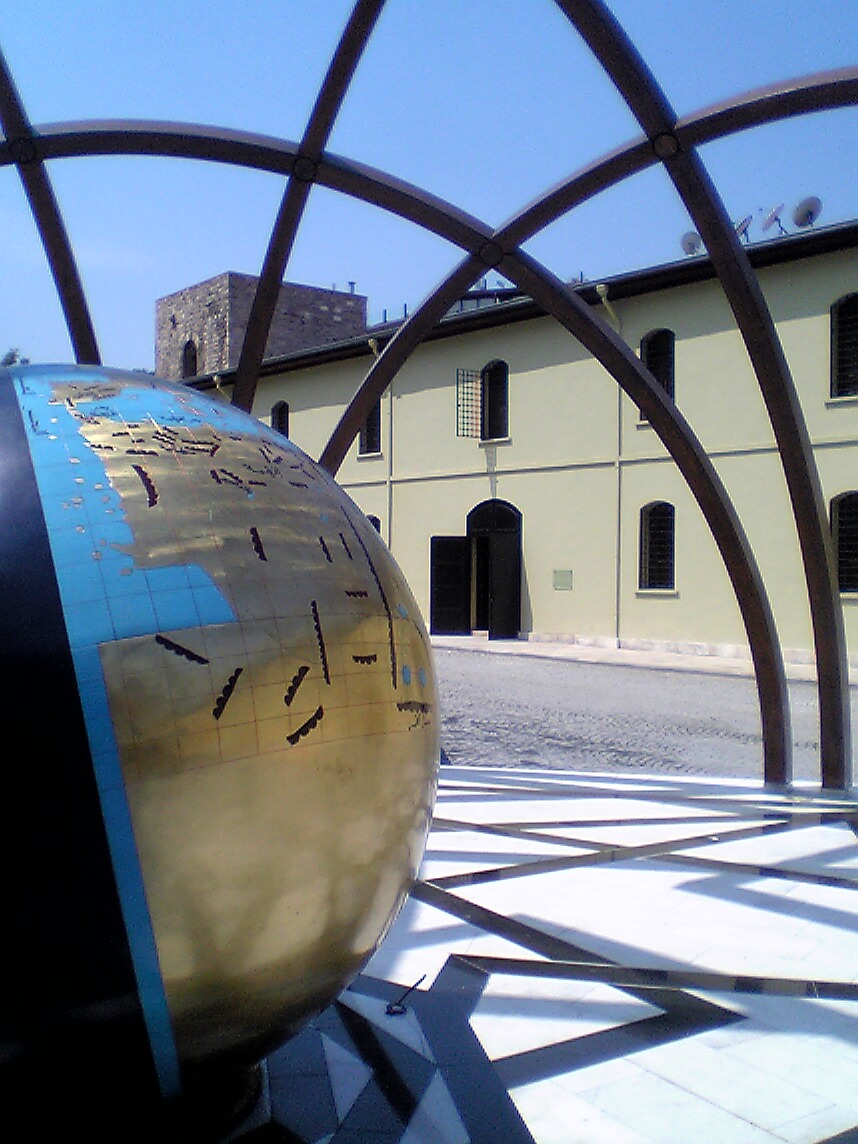
The Istanbul Museum of the History of Science and Technology in Islam

The Istanbul Museum of the History of Science and Technology in Islam is located in the former stables of Topkapı Palace, on the western edge of the park. It was opened in May 2008 by the Turkish Prime Minister Recep Tayyip Erdoğan. The museum features 140 replicas of inventions of the 8th to 16th centuries, from astronomy, geography, chemistry, surveying, optics, medicine, architecture, physics and warfare.

The Procession Kiosk (Turkish: Alay Köşkü) sits on the outer wall of the park overlooking the tramway and is accessible from inside the park. It contains the Ahmet Hamdi Tanpınar Museum Library.

== Future ==
The old barracks within the area of Gülhane is expected to be converted to a cultural center in due course; the center will host a library and exhibition hall together with a workshop on kilim and handicrafts. The park is so important for Istanbul because it has a dust holding capacity of 422.88 ton/year, and its carbon sink reaches up to 2738.9 ton. It can also produce 33.4 tons of oxygen per year.

== See also ==
- Ottoman architecture
- Statue of Âşık Veysel
- Statue of Atatürk (Gülhane Park)
- Turkish Ministry of Culture and Tourism - Gülhane Park

== Literature ==
- Necipoğlu, Gülru (1991). Architecture, ceremonial, and power: The Topkapi Palace in the fifteenth and sixteenth centuries. Cambridge, Massachusetts: The MIT Press. pp. 336 pages. ISBN 0-262-14050-0.
- Fanny Davis. Palace of Topkapi in Istanbul. 1970. ASIN B000NP64Z2
