= Statue of Alex =

Statue of a footballer in Istanbul, Turkey

- Alex Heykeli
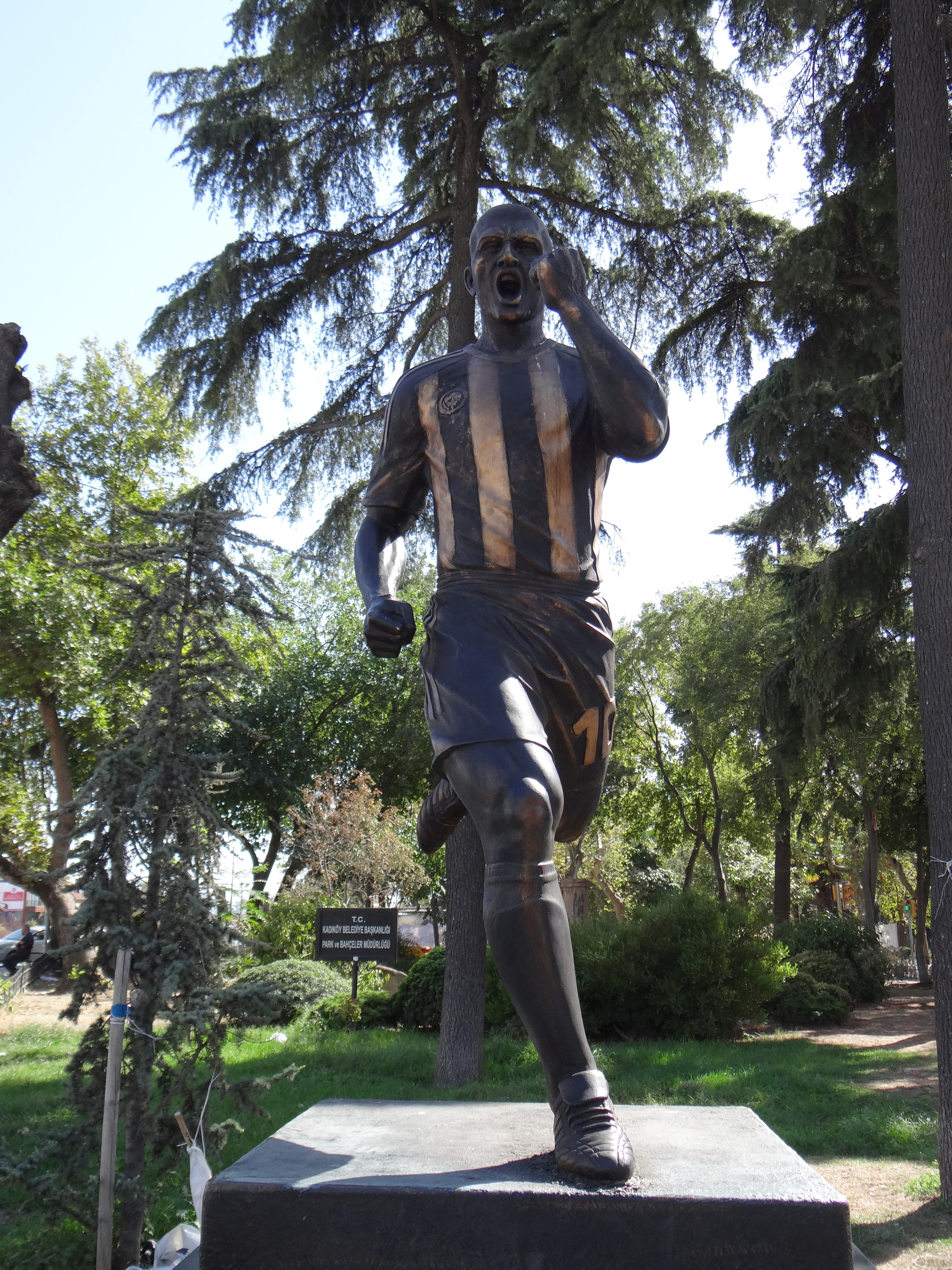
- Statue of Alex at Yoğurtçu Park in Kadıköy, Istanbul (2021)
- Interactive map of Statue of Alex
- Location: Şükrü Saracoğlu Stadium, Kadıköy, Istanbul, Turkey
- Coordinates: 40.98772°N 29.03587°E
- Type: Statue
- Material: Bronze
- Opening date: 15 September 2012; 13 years ago
- Dedicated to: Alexsandro de Souza

The Statue of Alex (Turkish: Alex Heykeli) is a statue of the Brazilian former footballer Alexsandro de Souza situated in front of the Şükrü Saracoğlu Stadium in Istanbul, Turkey. It was unveiled in 2012.

== Background ==
Alexsandro de Souza (born 1977), commonly known as Alex, played for the Turkish Süper Lig club Fenerbahçe in Istanbul between 2004–2012 with the shirt number 10, which was entrusted to him by Lefter Küçükandonyadis, former Fenerbahçe footballer in the years 1947–1951 and 1953–1964, and captained the team from 2007 to 2012.

== History ==
Organized and financed by supporter groups of the football club, a full-length sculpture depicting him was installed at Yoğurtçu Park close to Şükrü Saracoğlu Stadium, the home ground of the football team, in Kadıköy district of Istanbul, Turkey. After the completion of the statue, the opening ceremony was postponed due to the ongoing court case against the club president and the members of the board of directors. On 15 September 2012, the statue was unveiled in a ceremony attended by Alex and his family, high officials of the club and supporters.

In 2020, during the COVID-19 pandemic in Turkey, his fans outfitted the statue with a face mask and gloves to raise awareness about protections from COVID-19.

== Relocation ==
In February 2024, it was announced that the management of Fenerbahçe decided the relocation of the statue of Alex along with the statue of Lefter Küçükandonyadis and statue of Can Bartu from their original place at the Yoğurtçu Park to the area in front of the stadium, where a bust of Atatürk stands, and a statue of Eda Erdem, the long-year player and captain of the Fenerbahçe Women's Volleyball, was planned to be unveiled on 8 March, the International Women's Day. In April 2024, the statueof Alex was removed from its original place, and put into storage.

== See also ==
- 2012 in art
- List of public art in Istanbul
