= Şükrü Saracoğlu Stadium =

Football stadium in Istanbul, Turkey

- Fenerbahçe Şükrü Saracoğlu Spor Kompleksi (UEFA competitions)
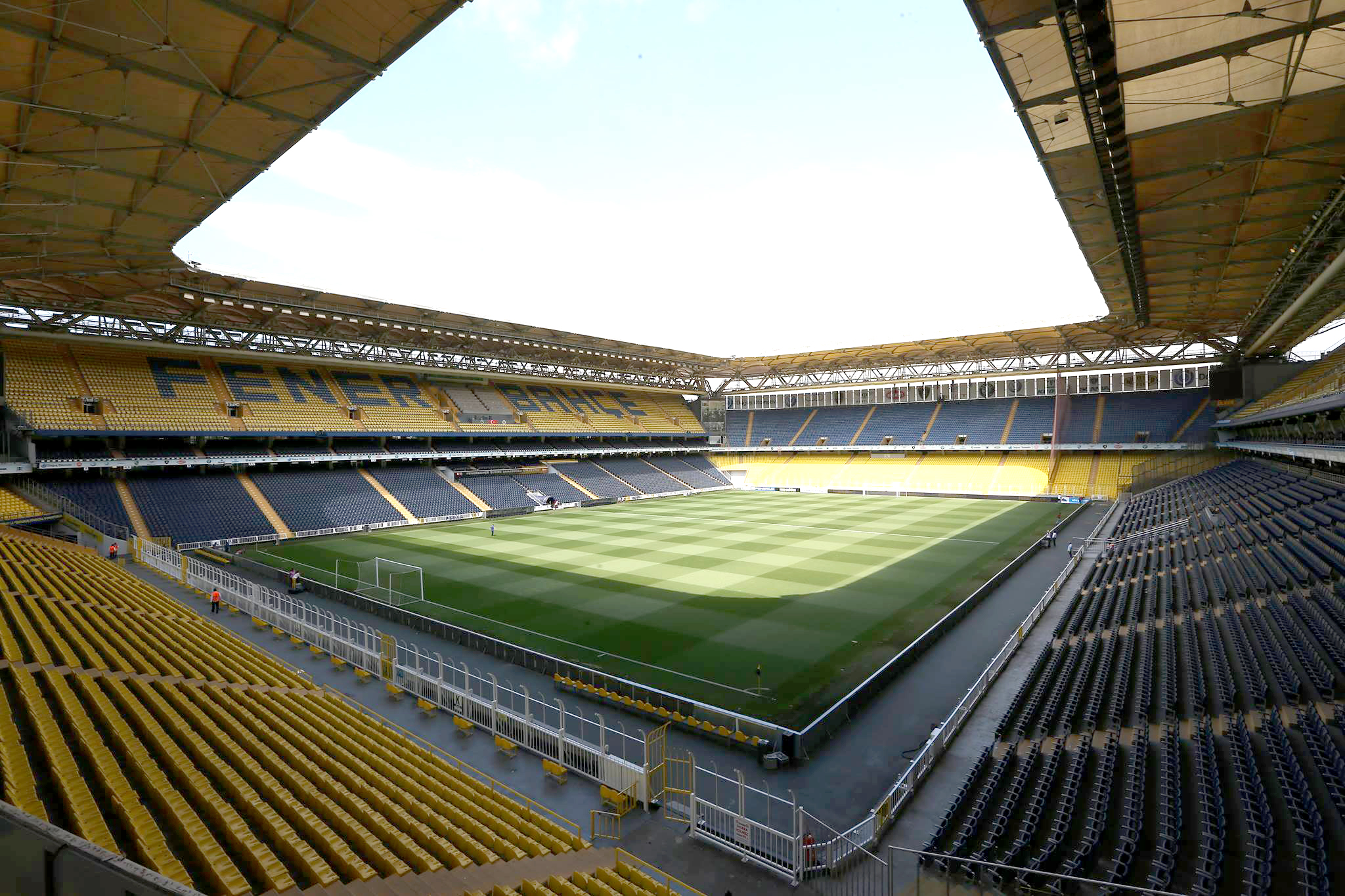
- UEFA

- Location in Istanbul Location in Turkey
- Full name: Chobani Stadyumu Fenerbahçe Şükrü Saracoğlu Spor Kompleksi
- Former names: Papazın Çayırı (1900–1908); Union Club Field (1908–1915); İttihat Spor Field (1915–1929); Fenerbahçe Stadium (1929–1998); Ülker Stadium (2015–2025)
- Location: Kadıköy, Istanbul, Turkey
- Coordinates: 40°59′16″N 29°02′13″E
- Owner: Fenerbahçe S.K.
- Operator: Fenerbahçe S.K.
- Capacity: 47,911 (all-seater)
- Executive suites: 84
- Surface: Hybrid grass
- Scoreboard: LED 1790x1662 px
- Field size: 105 by 68 metres (115 yd × 74 yd)
- Acreage: 110,304 m²
- Public transit: at Söğütlüçeşme

Construction
- Opened: 17 September 1908
- Renovated: 1929–1932, 1965–1982, 1999–2006
- Cost: US$85 million ($136 million in 2025 dollars)
- Architect: AZAKSU Architects

Tenants
- Fenerbahçe S.K. (1908–present); Turkey national football team (selected matches)

The Şükrü Saracoğlu Stadium (Turkish pronunciation: [ˈʃycɾy saɾaˈdʒoːɫu]), known for sponsorship reasons as Chobani Stadium Fenerbahçe Şükrü Saracoğlu Sports Complex (Turkish: Chobani Stadyumu Fenerbahçe Şükrü Saracoğlu Spor Kompleksi) or simply Chobani Stadium, is a football stadium located in the Kadıköy district of Istanbul, Turkey. It is the traditional home venue of major Turkish multi-sport club Fenerbahçe S.K. since its opening on 17 September 1908.

This stadium holds the distinction of being the first venue in the Ottoman Empire to host mass sporting (especially football) events. As such, it is a prime example of the sports build culture that has been transmitted to Modern Turkey. It was inaugurated on 17 September 1908 and renovated between 1929 and 1932, 1965 and 1982, and finally 1999 and 2006. It is one of the highest capacity stadiums in Turkey. Named after Şükrü Saracoğlu, one of Fenerbahçe S.K.'s longest-serving presidents and an important statesman who was also both the Prime Minister (1942–1946) and the Foreign Minister (1938–1942) of Turkey. On 4 October 2006, after numerous inspections by UEFA, Şükrü Saracoğlu Stadium (in 2009, coinciding with the 101st anniversary of its opening) was selected to host the 2009 UEFA Cup Final that went down in history as the last Final of the UEFA Cup football tournament, which was rebranded as the UEFA Europa League starting from the 2009–10 season.

== History ==
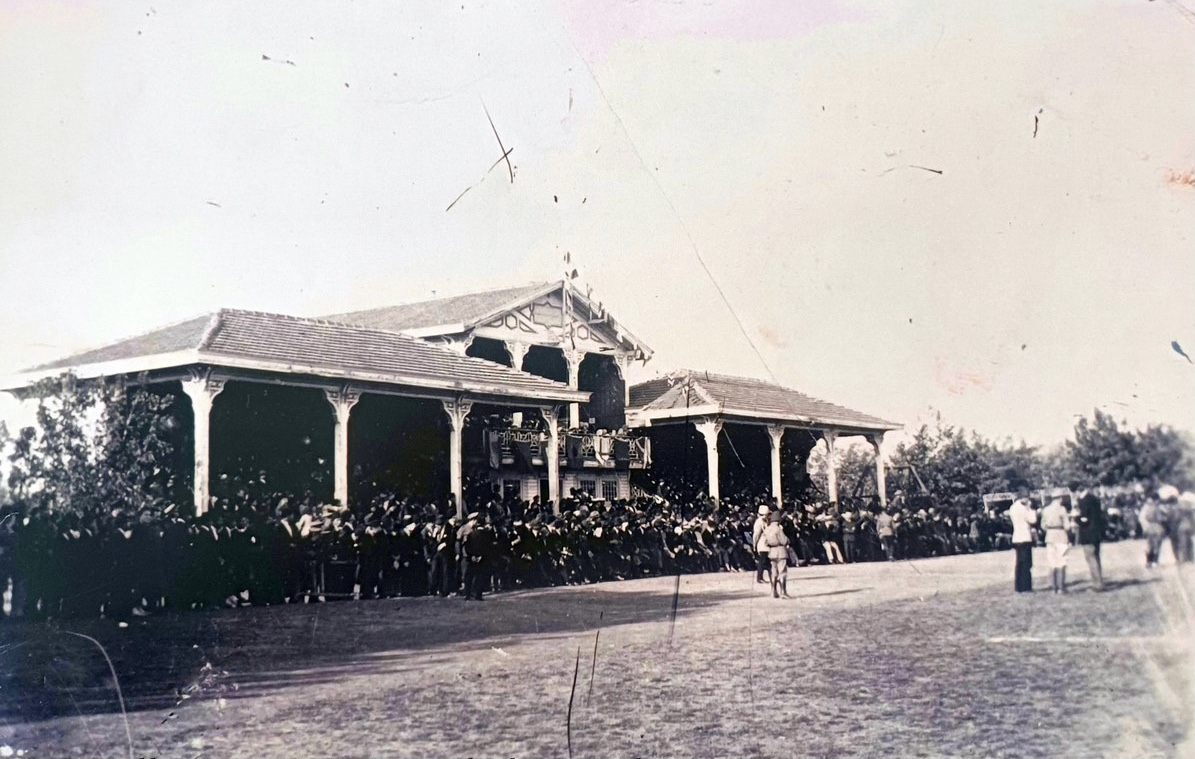
Fenerbahçe Stadium, 1913

Before the stadium was built, the field was known as Papazın Çayırı (lit. 'the priest's meadow'). The field, however, became the very first official association football pitch of Turkey, where the first league games of the Istanbul Football League were all held consecutively. Until the Young Turks proclaimed the 2nd Constitutional Era in 1908 — a milestone that sparked profound socio-political change within Ottoman society — this green area had long been part of the Sultan's private estate. That same year, a group of passionate sportsmen, led by Nurizade Ziya Songülen (the founder and first president of Fenerbahçe) and Cemil Topuzlu (then the physician to Abdul Hamid II), launched an initiative to secure land in Istanbul dedicated to football activities. After careful consideration, they chose this very plot as the ideal location. In 1908, the local teams in the league needed a regular football field, so this land was leased from the Sultan of Ottoman Empire Abdul Hamid II for 30 Ottoman gold pounds a year. The total construction cost was 3,000 Ottoman gold pounds. The stadium that was established at that time was named ‘Union Club Field’ by a group of sports enthusiasts led by Ziya Songülen, the founding president of Fenerbahçe, together with Cemil Topuzlu and Reji Whittall — one of the earliest figures to play football within the Ottoman Empire. The name was derived from the ‘Union Club' an organization which, in essence, functioned as the football federation of that era.

The Union Club Field was used by many teams in İstanbul, including the owner, Union Club (which changed its name to İttihatspor after World War I), Fenerbahçe, Galatasaray, and Beşiktaş. However, it lost its importance when a bigger venue, the Taksim Stadium, was built in 1922, inside the courtyard of the historic Taksim Topçu Kışlası (Taksim Artillery Barracks), which was located at the present-day Taksim Gezi Parkı (Taksim Park).

İttihatspor (which had close relations with the political İttihat ve Terakki), was forced to sell it to the state, in which Şükrü Saracoğlu (1887–1953) was a member of the CHP government. Thus, the ownership of the stadium passed to the state, but the field was immediately leased to Fenerbahçe. Later, on 27 May 1933, Fenerbahçe purchased the stadium from the government when Şükrü Saracoğlu was the President of Fenerbahçe, for either the symbolic amount of ₺1 or the worth of the stadium which was ₺9,000.

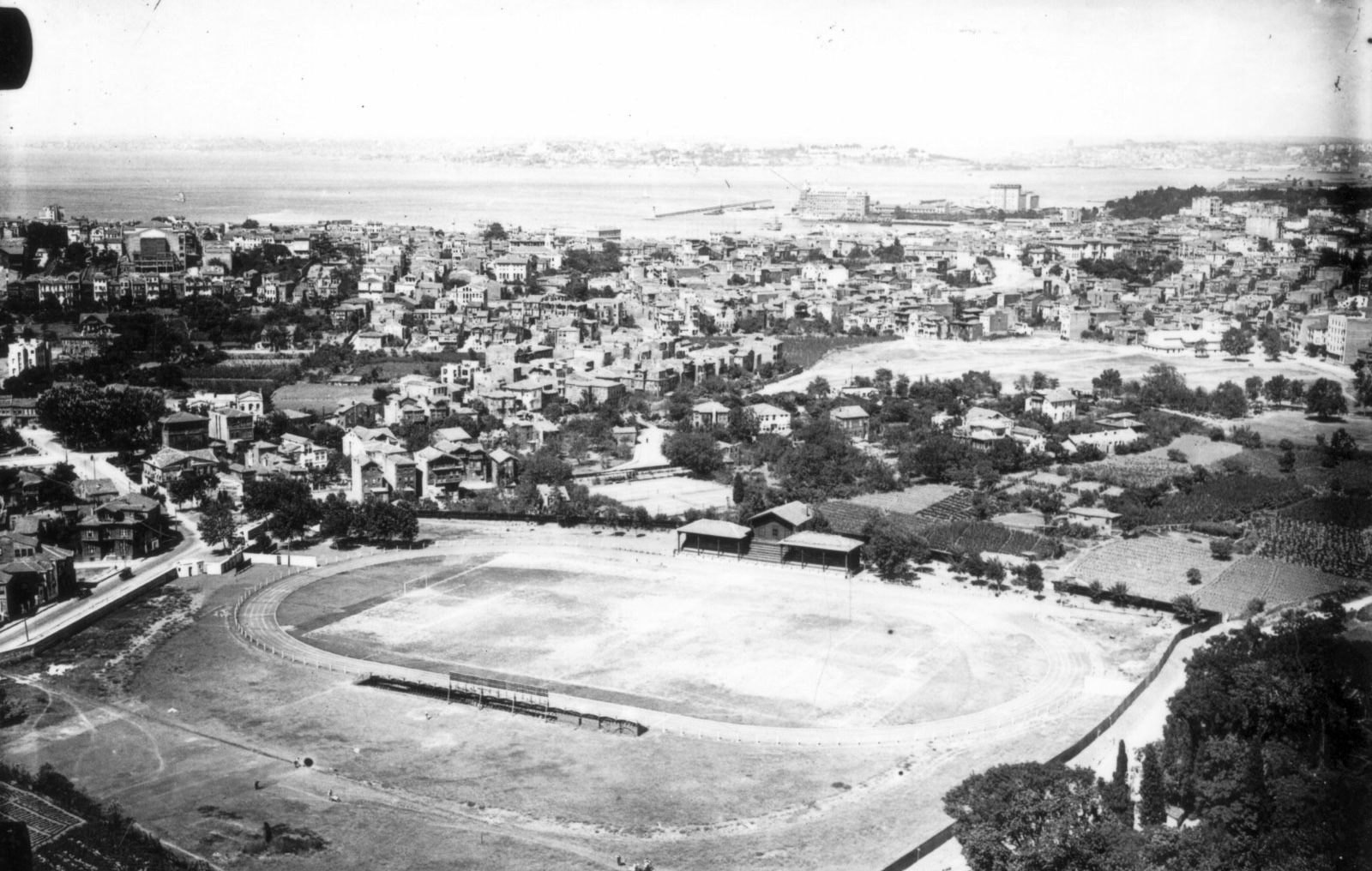
Aerial view of Fenerbahçe Stadium with Kadıköy district (Haydarpaşa) in the background, 1932

The name of the field was changed to Fenerbahçe Stadium, and this made Fenerbahçe SK the first football club in Turkey to own their stadium, with the help of the Şükrü Saracoğlu government. In the following years, Fenerbahçe S.K. renovated the stadium and increased its seating capacity. By the year 1949, Fenerbahçe Stadium was the largest football venue in Turkey, with a seating capacity of 25,000. No longer meeting demand, the field was closed to matches in 1964 and demolished in 1965. After 18 years of construction, it was officially opened for service on September 19, 1982, with the Fenerbahçe-Altay match.

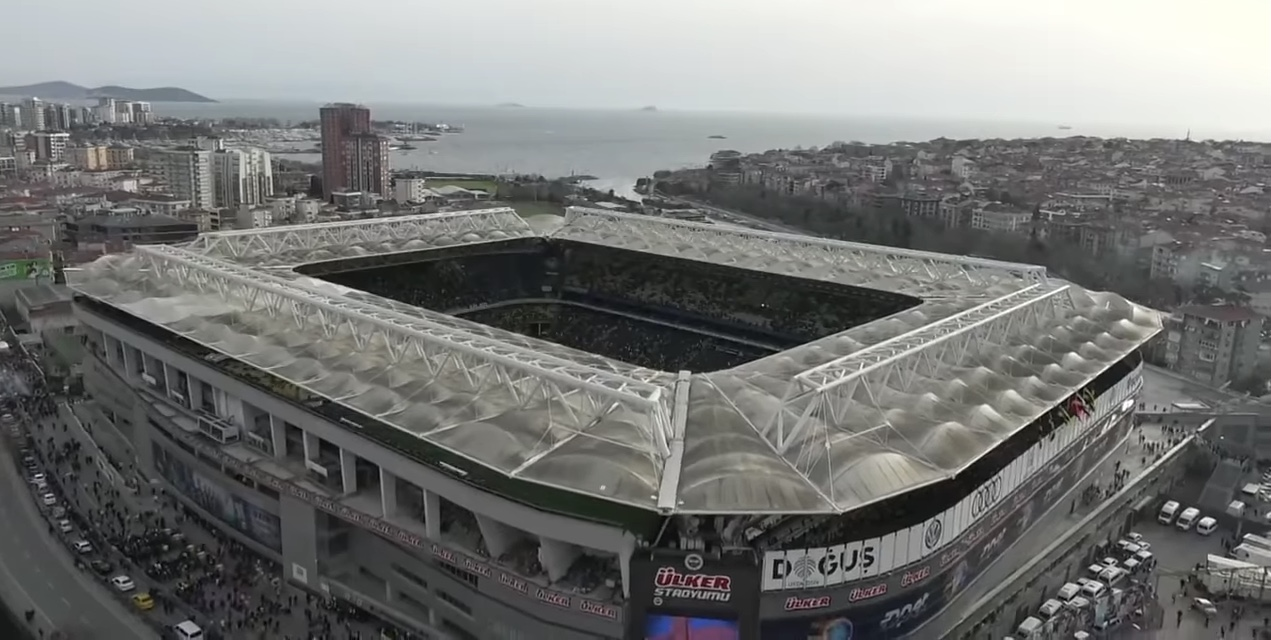
Top view of Saracoğlu Stadium

The name of the stadium was changed once more on 22 July 1998, becoming Fenerbahçe Şükrü Saracoğlu Stadium, named after Fenerbahçe's legendary chairman (1934–1950) and Turkey's fifth prime minister Şükrü Saracoğlu. In 1999, the latest round of renovations and capacity increasing projects started. The stands on the four sides of the stadium were torn down one at a time, as the Turkish Super League seasons progressed, and the entire renewal and construction project was finalised in 2006. As of 3 August 2015, Ülker secured naming rights of the stadium in a 10-year deal worth $90 million officially renaming the stadium Ülker Stadium Fenerbahçe Şükrü Saracoğlu Sports Complex. Chobani secured naming rights of the stadium on 30 July 2025. Fenerbahçe S.K. and Chobani have reached an agreement on stadium naming sponsorship, starting from the 2025–26 season, for 5+5 seasons, i.e. a total of 10 years, with a payment of €10 million per season.

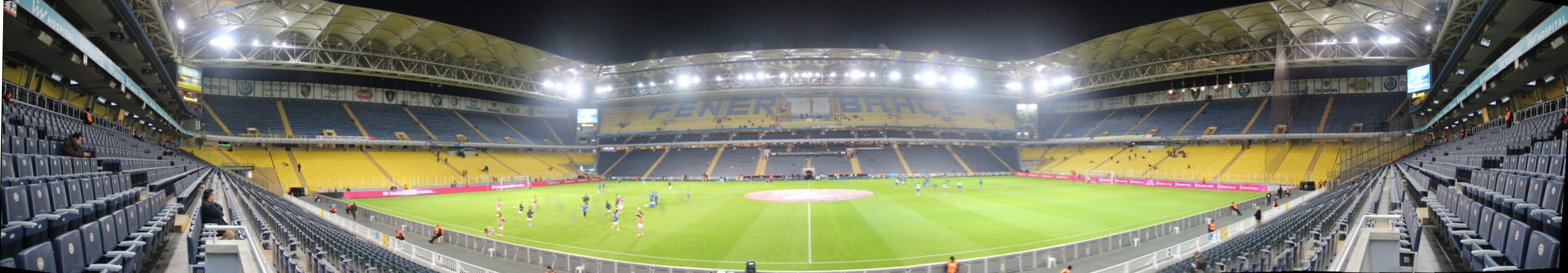
Saracoğlu Stadium in 2014 (Panoramic)

== Modernizations ==
At this stadium whose last major modernization was carried out approximately 20 years ago (2006) the club had long faced extensive criticism from both the wider Fenerbahçe community and its supporters regarding the need to bring the stands up to contemporary standards and modernize the stadium’s overall design, particularly in terms of improving its acoustics.

In this context, during the 2026 electoral congress, the candidate administration announced that a large-scale modernization project would be undertaken throughout the 2026–27 Super Lig season, while Fenerbahçe continued to play its matches at the stadium. The proposed approach is based on an “in-situ renovation” concept which according to the candidate administration, would also put an end to discussions about relocating the stadium away from its traditional setting.

As part of the project, the club plans to place its initial orders for the required steel structures and, immediately after the reinforced-concrete works are completed, install steel supports around the perimeter of the stadium. This would allow the overall diameter of the stadium to be expanded.

One of the most significant stages of the project involves raising the stadium roof. The existing roof is planned to be lifted approximately six metres using specially designed hydraulic jacks. Once the roof works have been completed, new stands are planned to be constructed behind both goals, together with the addition of 52 new executive boxes. The Maraton and Fenerium stands would also receive additional seating capacity, bringing the stadium’s total capacity to a planned 64,000 spectators.

The club has stated that the total construction cost is expected to be approximately €50 million. It has further announced that, with the number of executive boxes and the overall seating capacity increasing by approximately 30% compared with the current configuration, the project is expected to generate approximately €25 million in additional annual revenue.

Following the capacity expansion, the final stage of the project would involve the installation of a new exterior cladding system, bringing the stadium’s overall modernization process to completion.

== Artworks ==
A number of artworks are placed in front of the stadium:

- Bust of Atatürk
- Statue of Lefter Küçükandonyadis
- Statue of Can Bartu
- Statue of Alex
- Statue of Eda Erdem

== Gallery ==
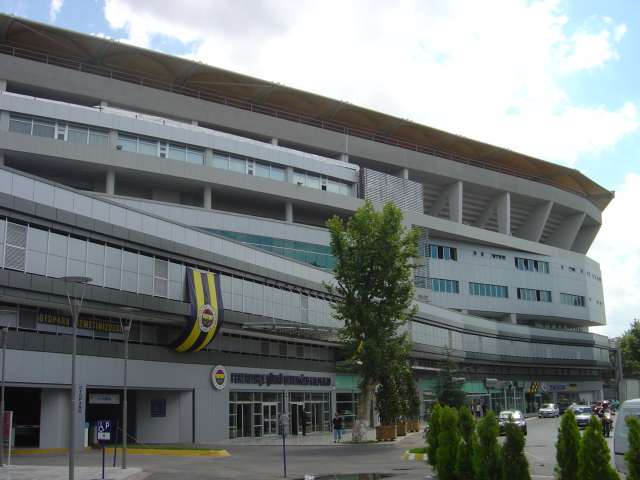
Stadium entrance

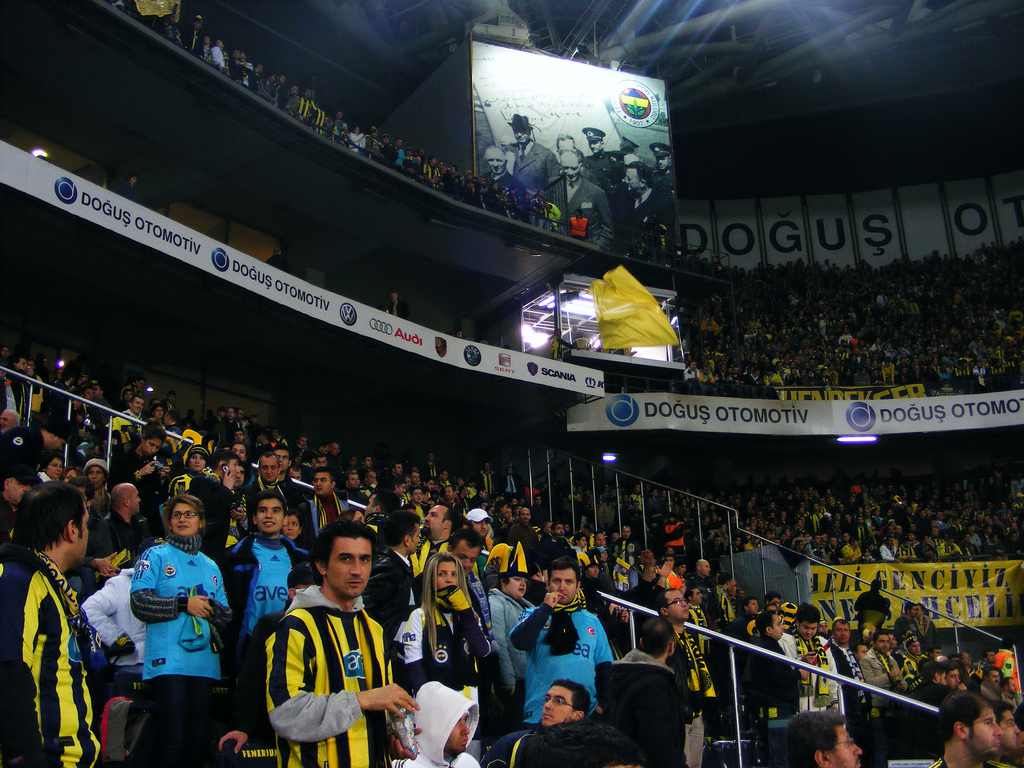
Interior view

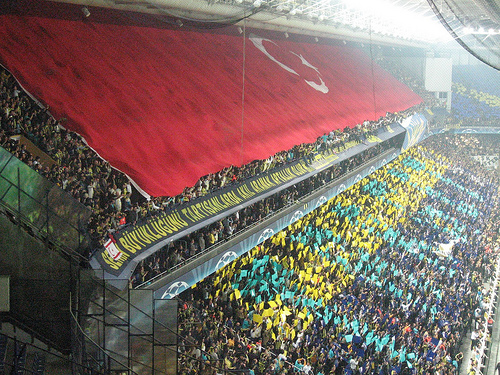
Interior view

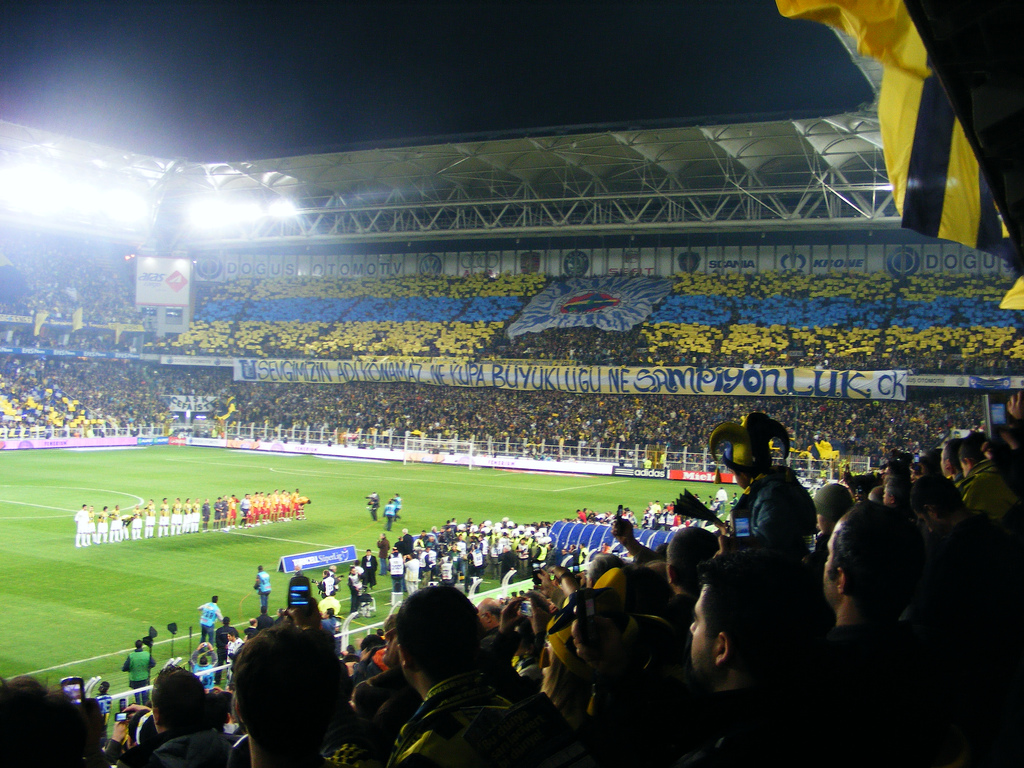
Interior view

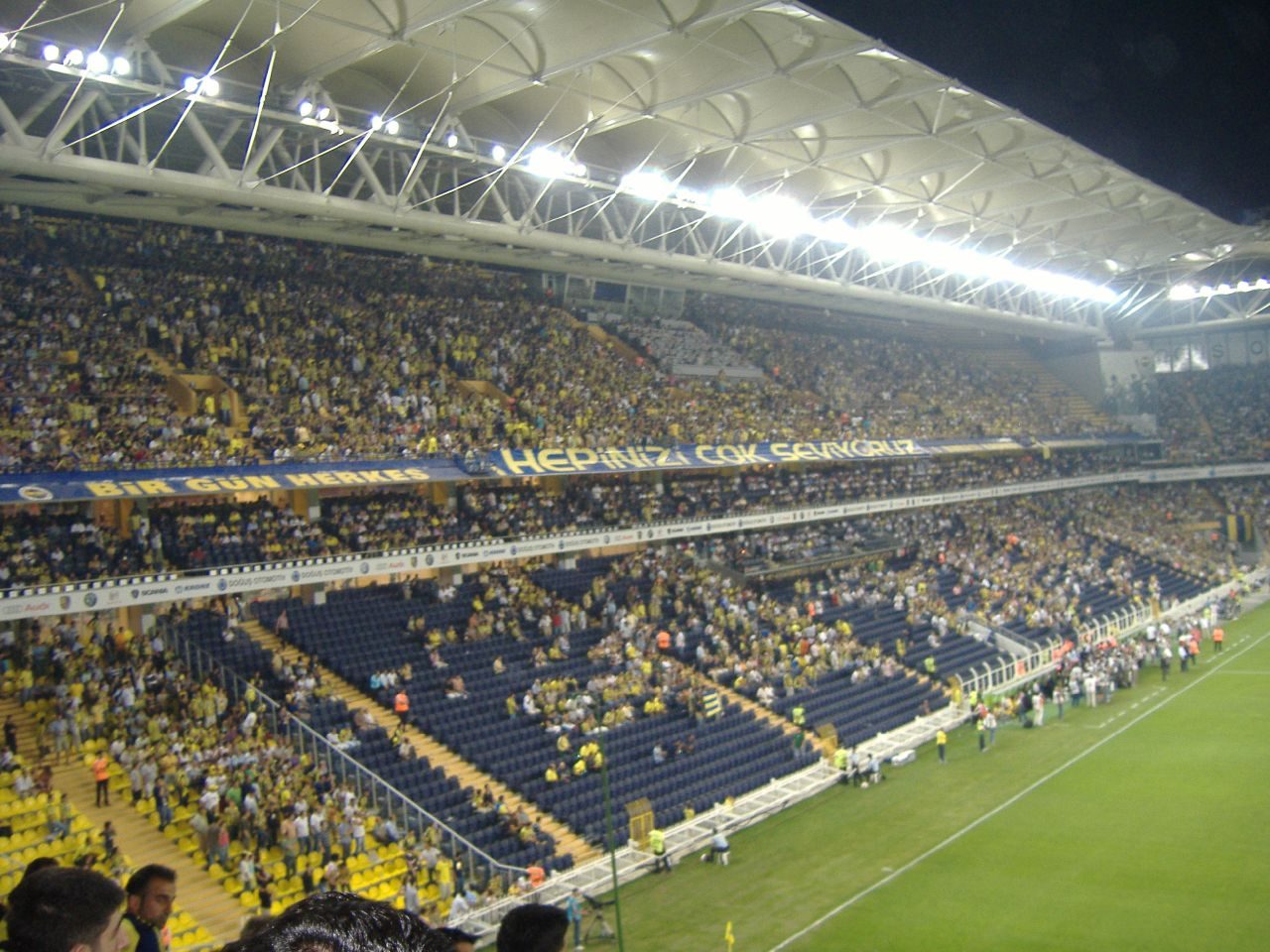
A view from the stadium

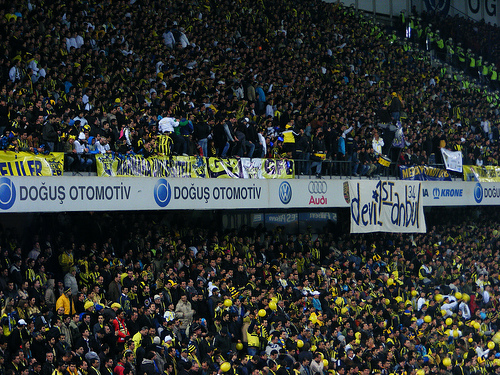
Interior view

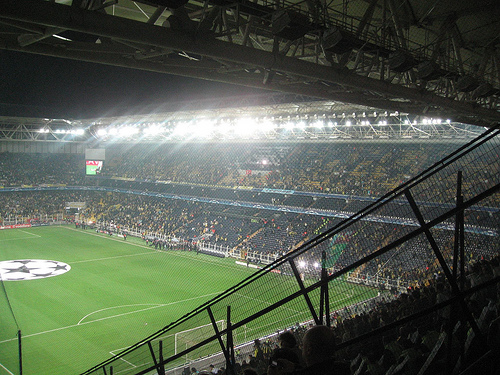
Interior view

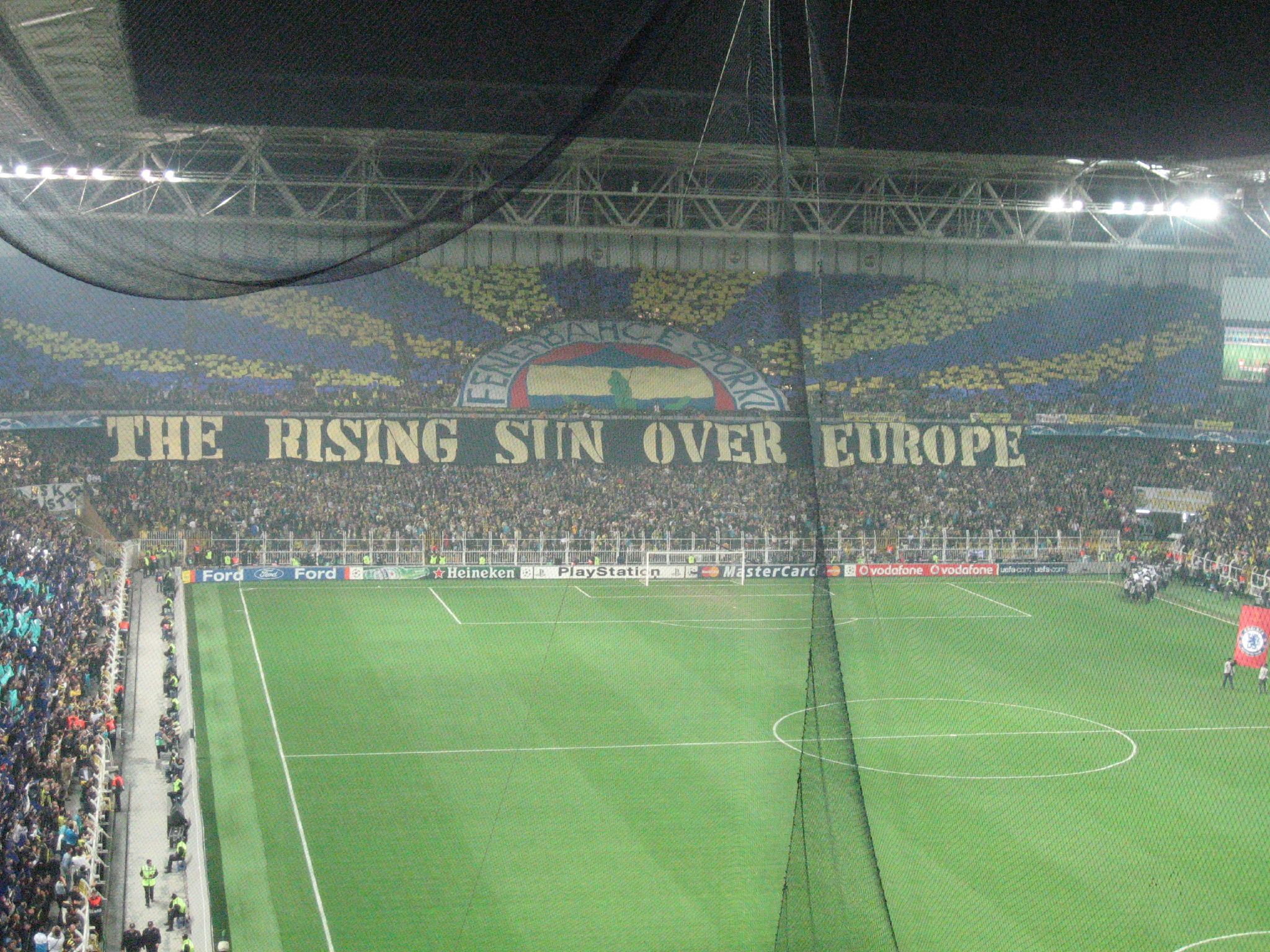
Interior view

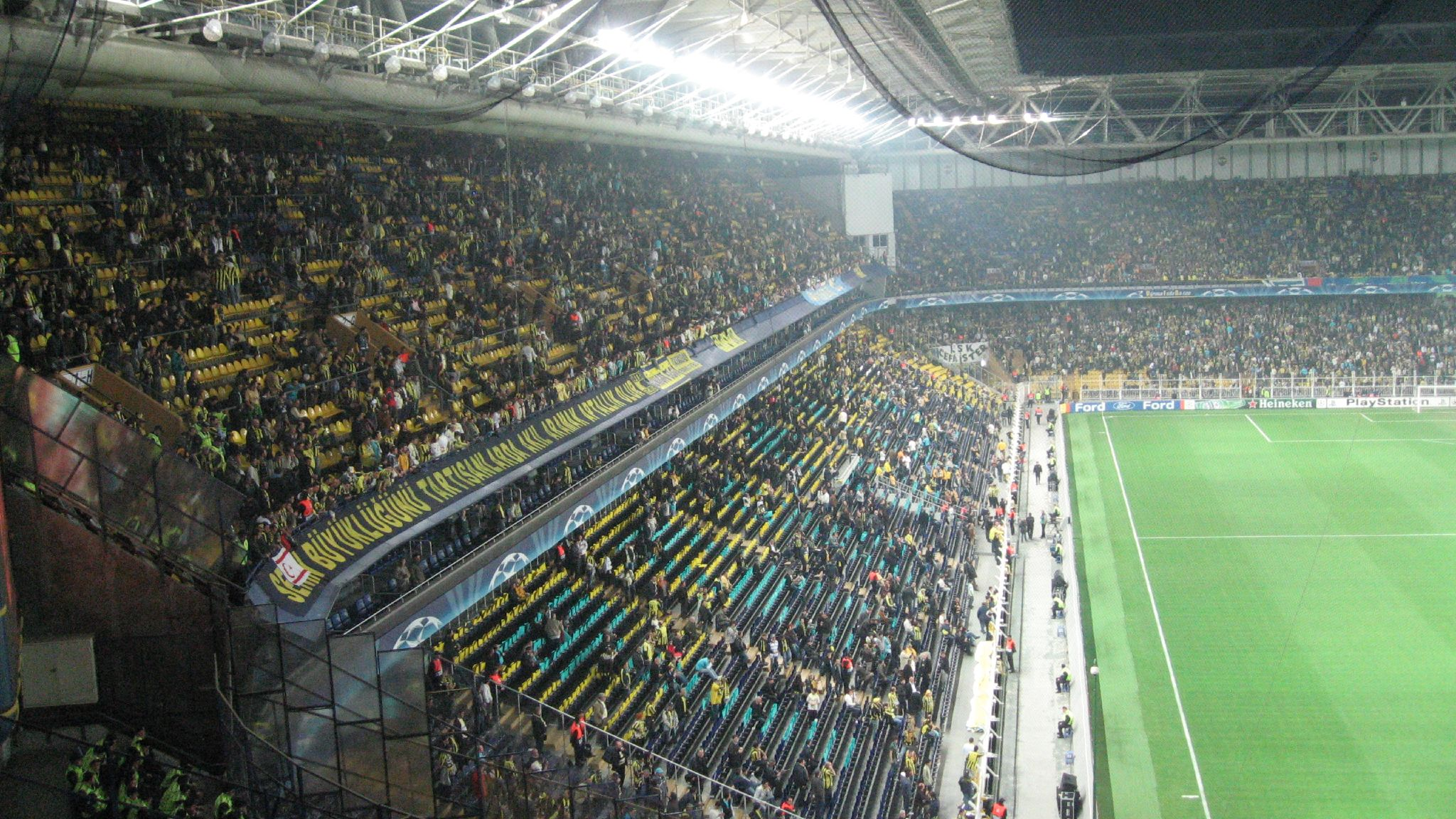
Interior view

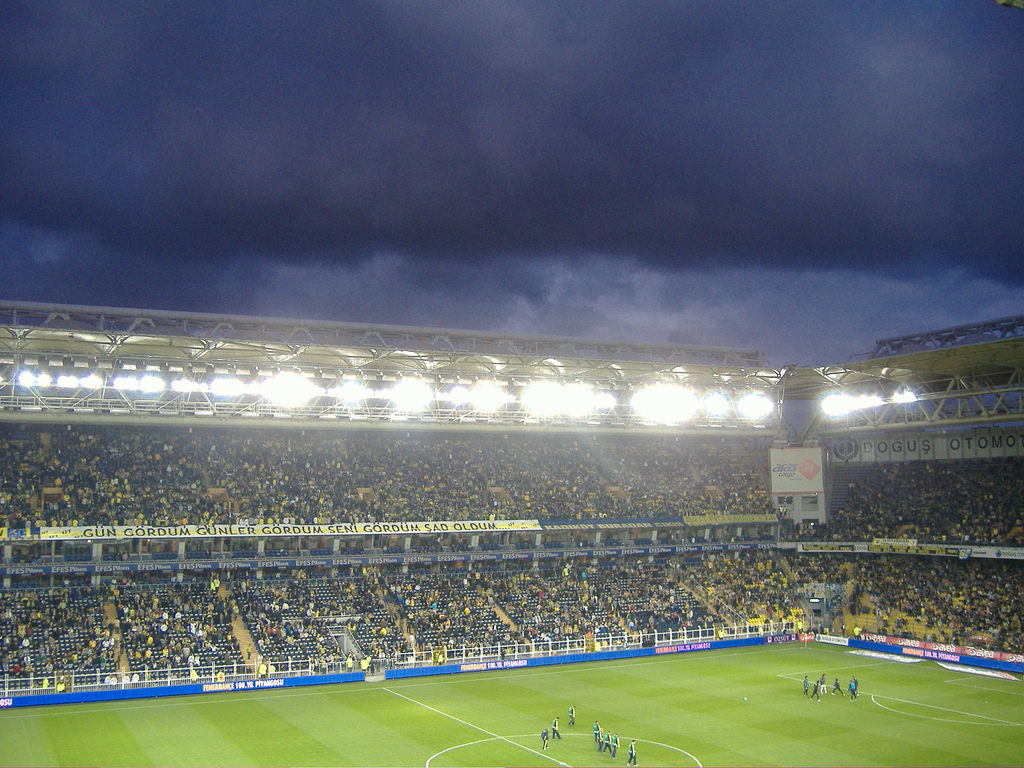
Interior view

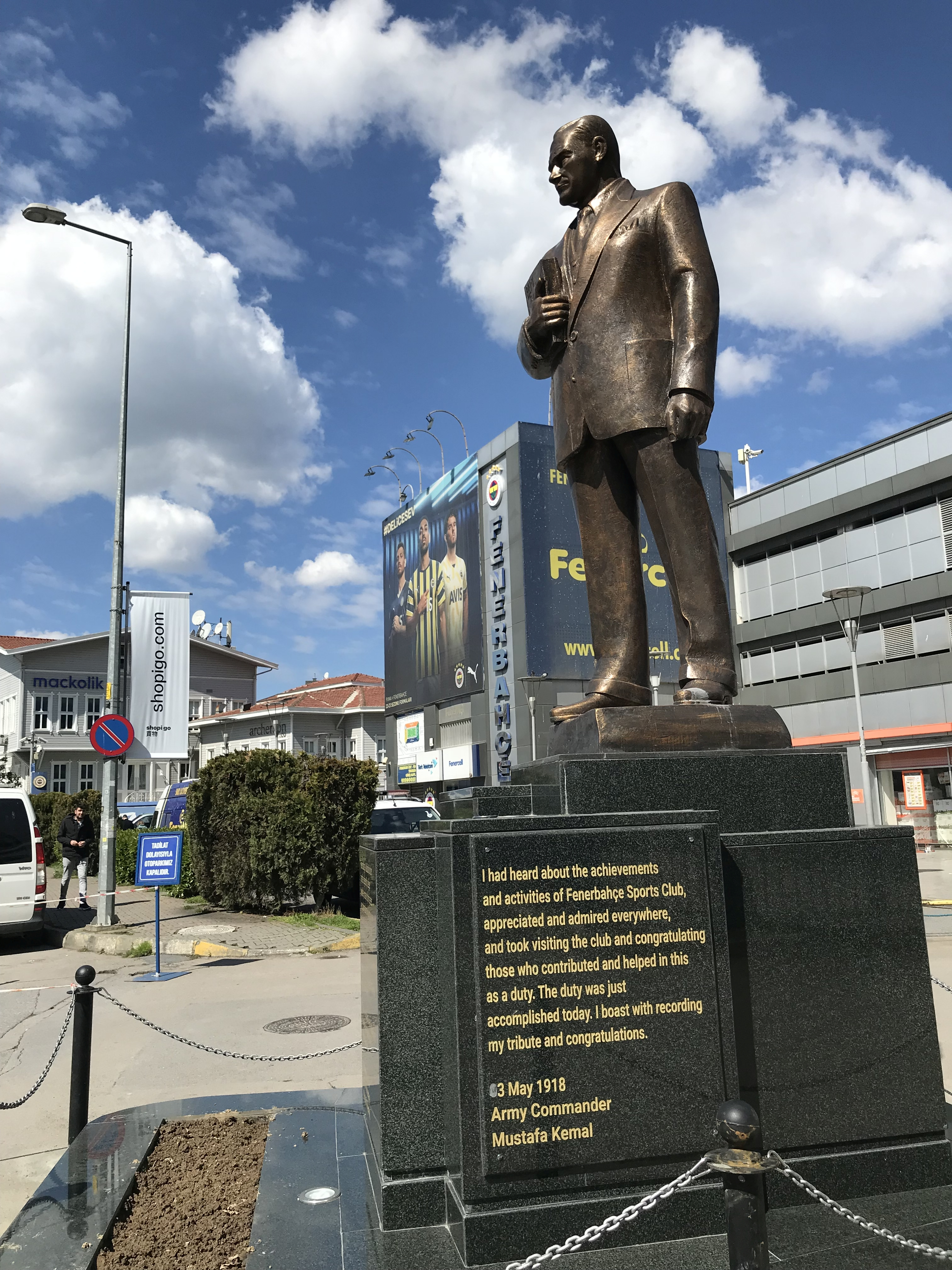
Atatürk statue

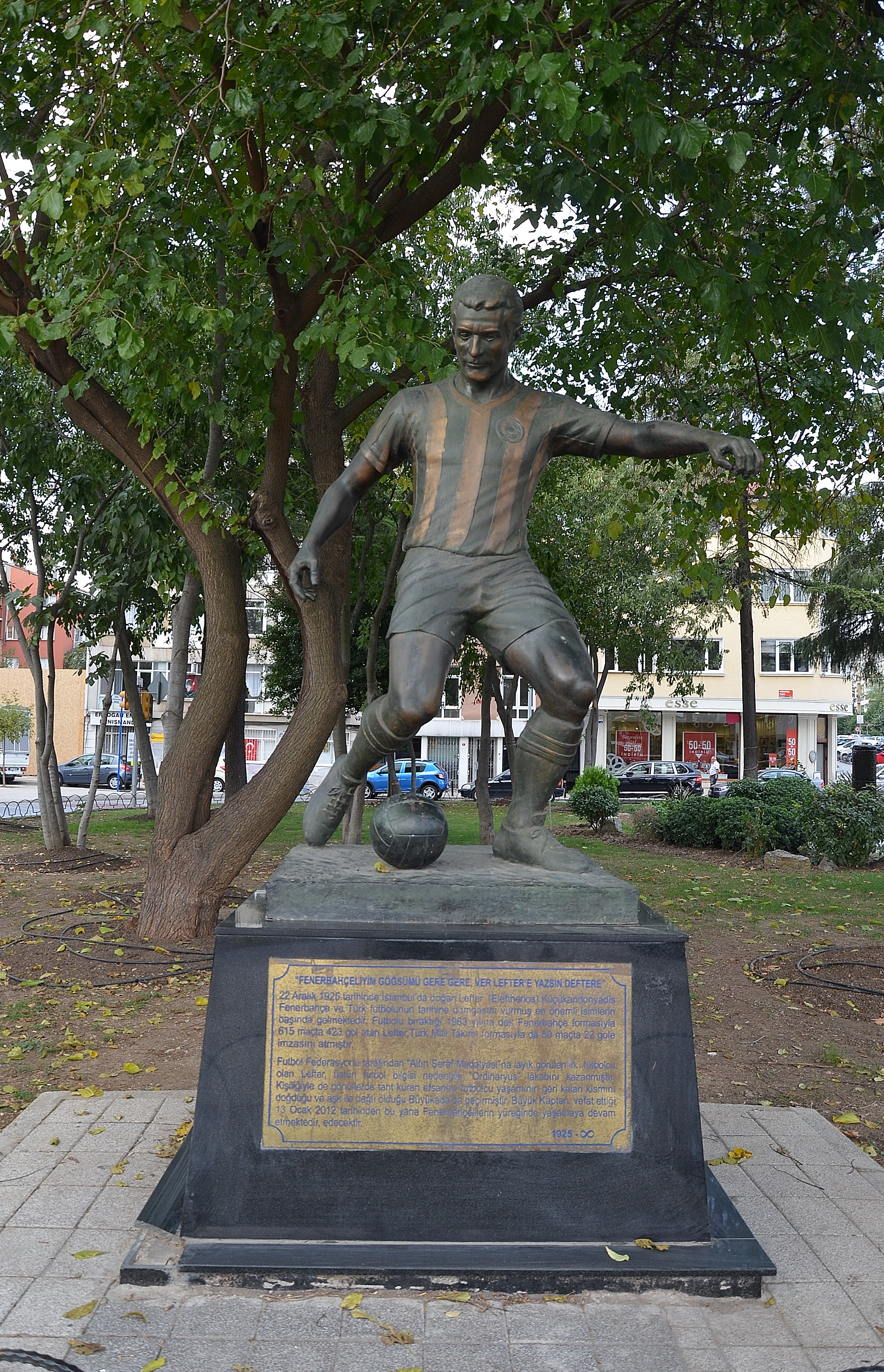
Lefter statue

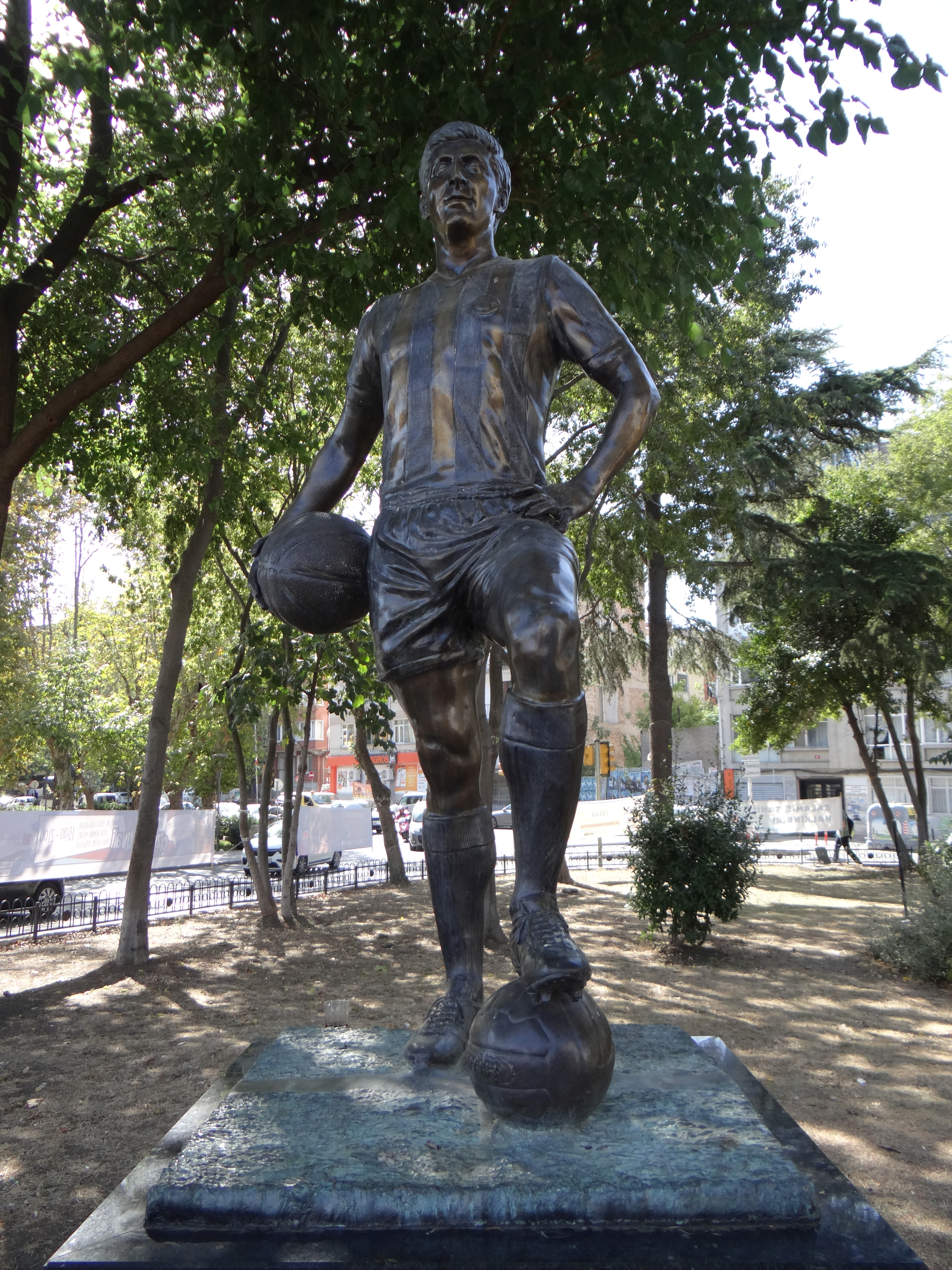
Can Bartu statue

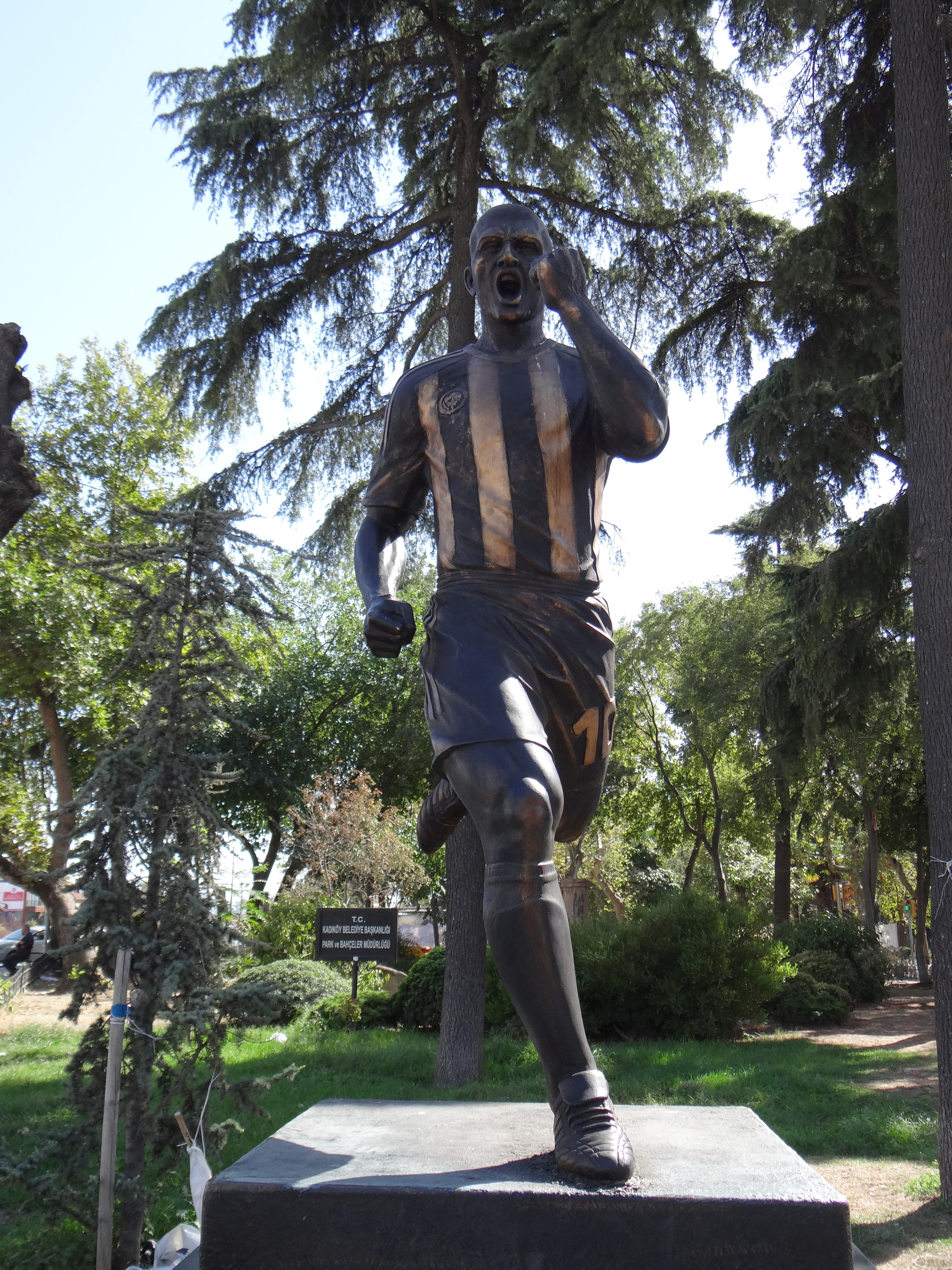
Alex statue

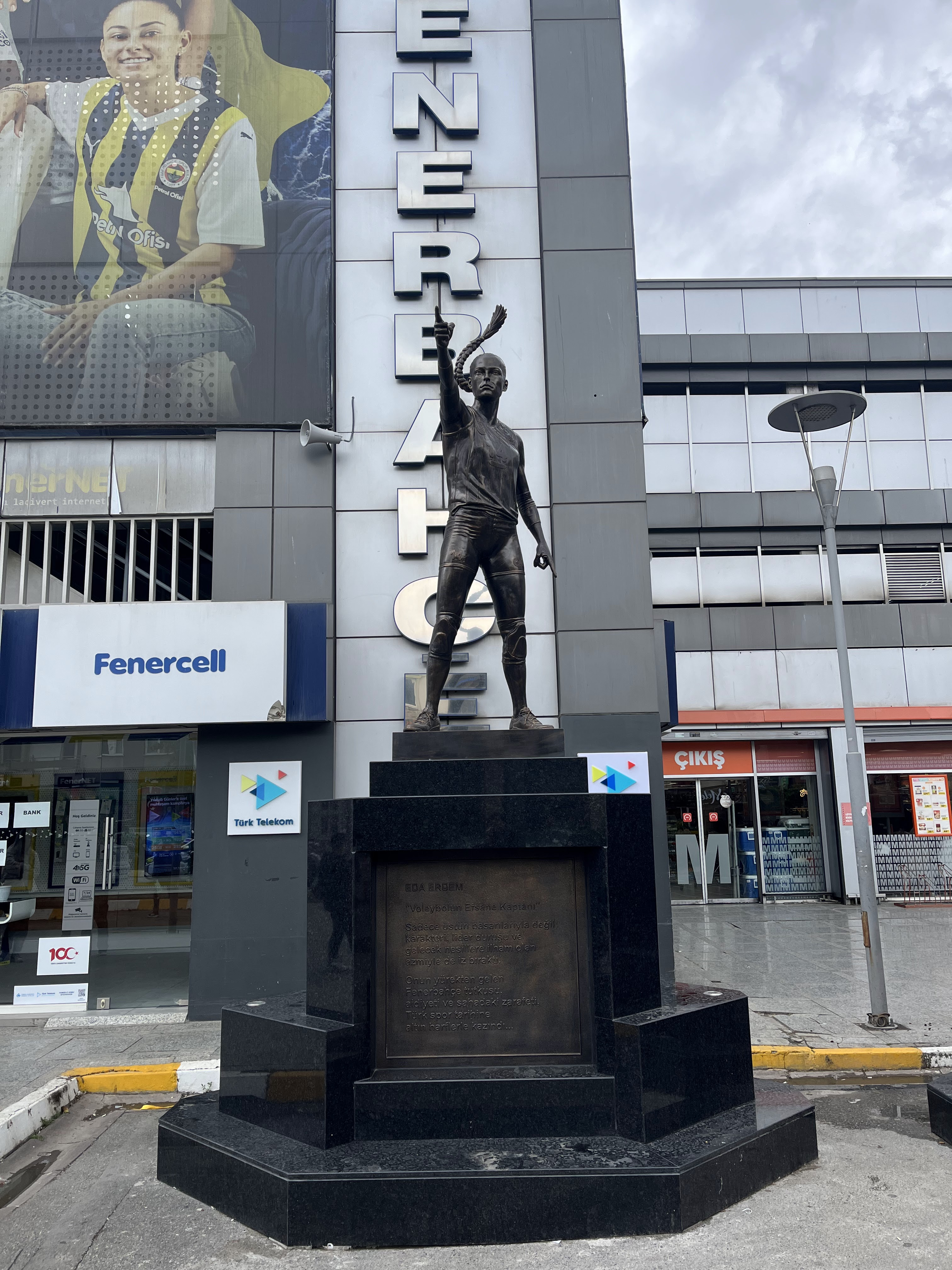
Eda Erdem statue

Preceded by City of Manchester Stadium; Manchester	UEFA Cup; Final venue 2009	Succeeded by HSH Nordbank Arena; Hamburg
