= Yoğurtçu Park =

Park in Kadıköy, Istanbul, Turkey

- Yoğurtçu Parkı
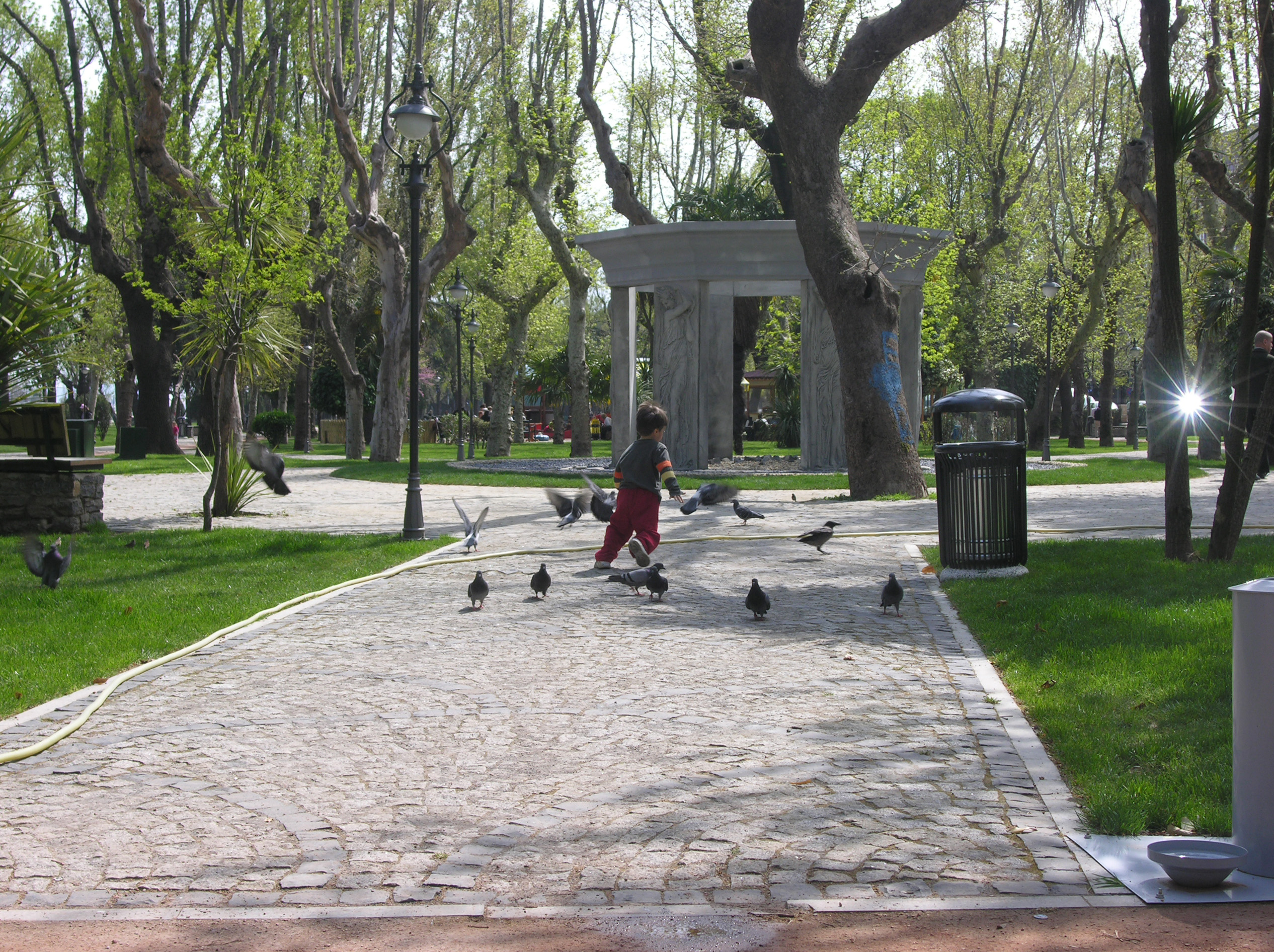
- The park in 2010
- Interactive map of Yoğurtçu Park
- Location: Kadıköy, Istanbul, Turkey
- Coordinates: 40°59′07″N 29°02′01″E

Yoğurtçu Park (Turkish: Yoğurtçu Parkı) is a park in Kadıköy, Istanbul, Turkey. The park has been used for demonstrations.

== Features ==
Features of the park include:

- a bust of Mustafa Kemal Atatürk
- a statue of Brazilian footballer Alex
- a statue of Turkish footballer and basketball player Can Bartu
- a statue of Yunus Emre
- a statue of Süreyya İlmen
- a statue of Turkish footballer Lefter Küçükandonyadis
- a statue of artist Fikret Mualla Saygı
- Yoğurtçu Fountain
