= List of public art in Istanbul =

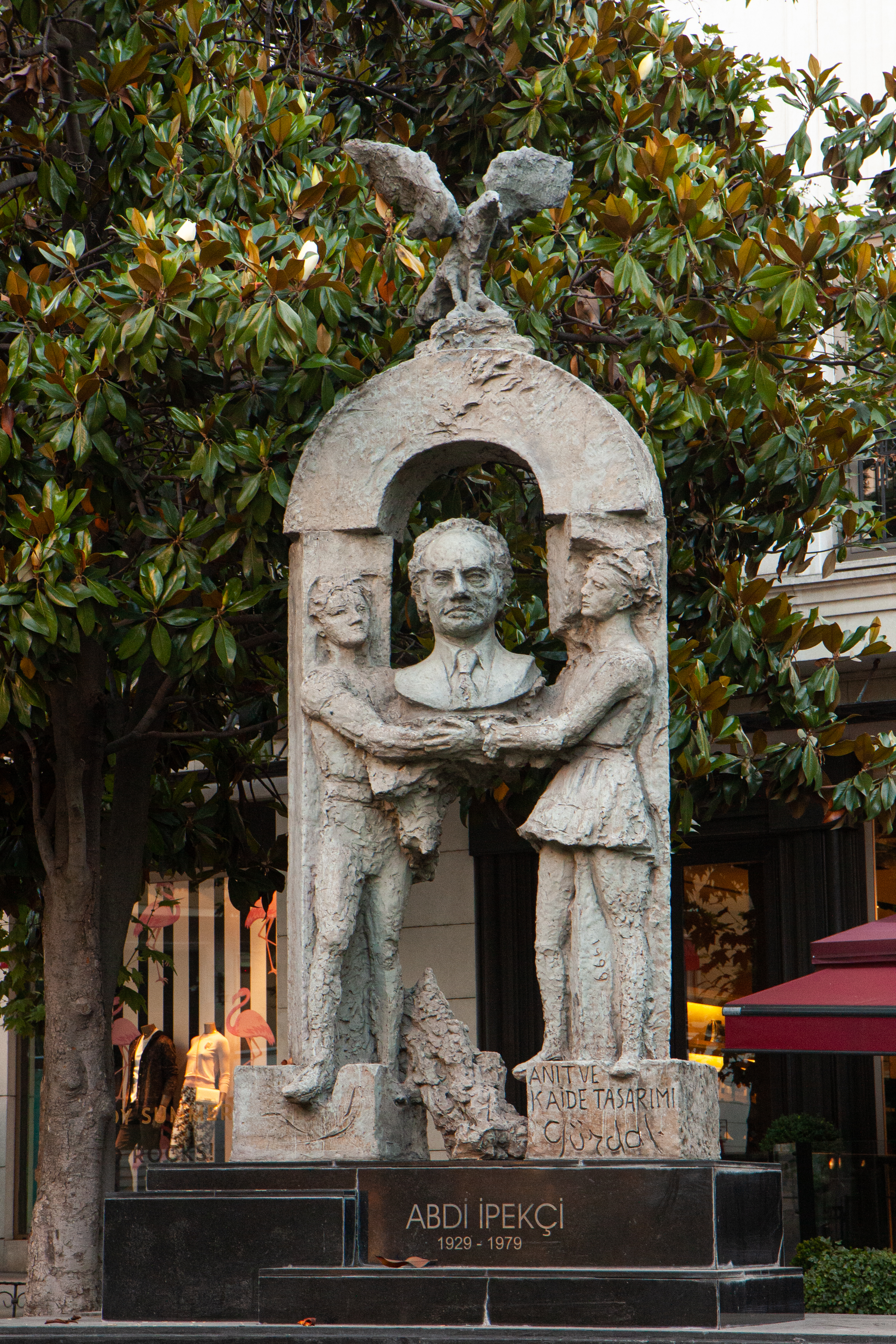
Abdi İpekçi Peace Monument

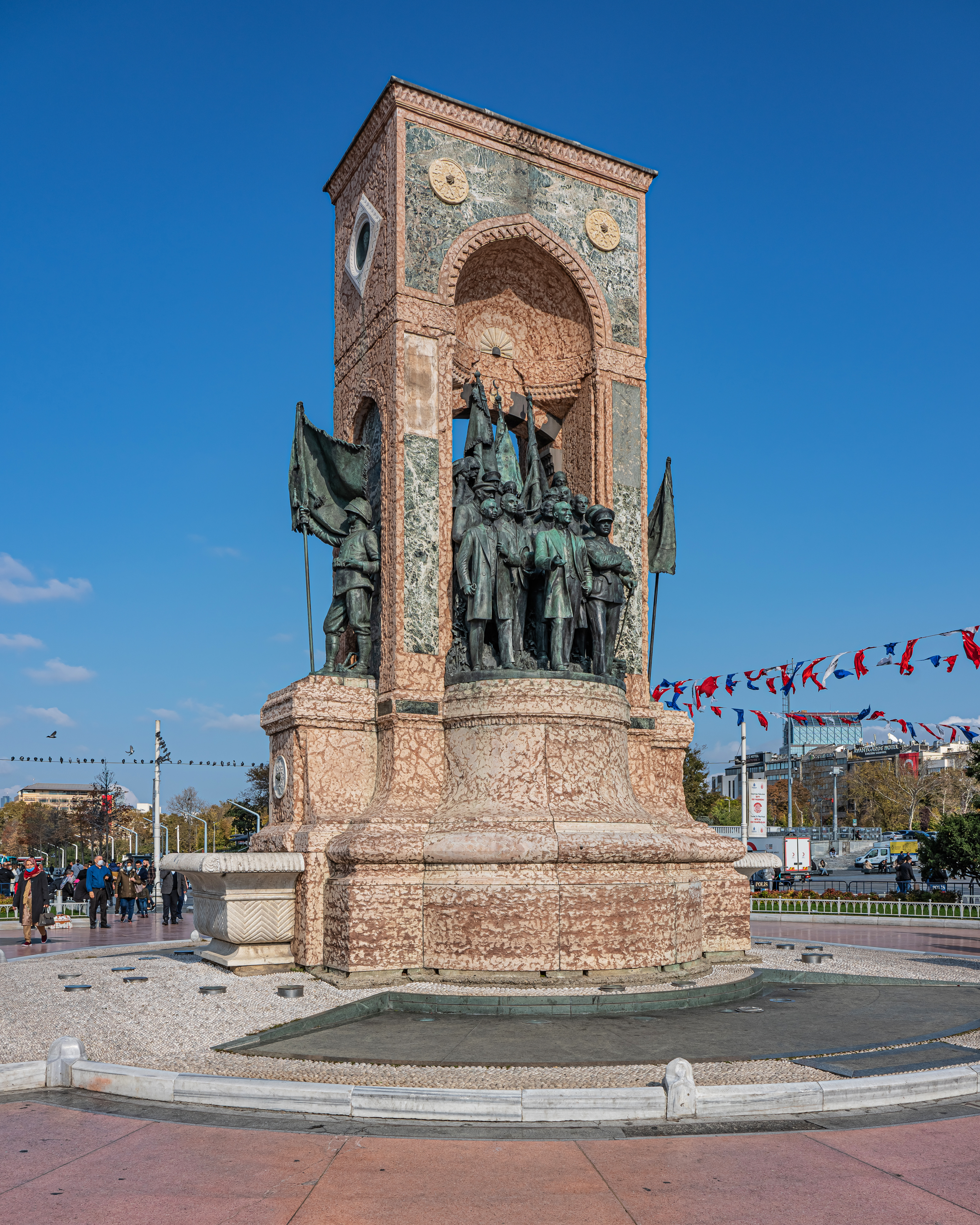
Republic Monument

Following is a list of public artwork that have been installed in Istanbul, Turkey:

- Abdi İpekçi Peace Monument
- Akdeniz
- Atatürk Monument (Kadıköy)
- Aviation Martyrs' Monument
- Barbaros Monument
- Bust of Atatürk
- Column of Constantine
- Column of the Goths
- Cyprus Monument
- Güzel İstanbul
- Ilhan Selçuk and the Enlightenment Instigators of the Republic Monument
- İsimlerin Şehri İstanbul
- Kadıköy bull statue
- Rainbow stairs
- Republic Monument
- Runner (2017) by Tony Cragg, Istanbul Modern
- Şairler Sofası
- Serpent Column
- Statue of Alex
- Statue of Âşık Veysel
- Statue of Atatürk (Gülhane Park)
- Statue of Atatürk (Sarayburnu)
- Statue of Can Bartu
- Statue of Eda Erdem
- Statue of Fikret Mualla Saygı
- Statue of Lefter Küçükandonyadis
- Statue of Peace
- Statue of Pope John XXIII
- Statue of Süreyya İlmen
- Statue of Yunus Emre
