= Cyprus Monument =

Monument in Istanbul, Turkey

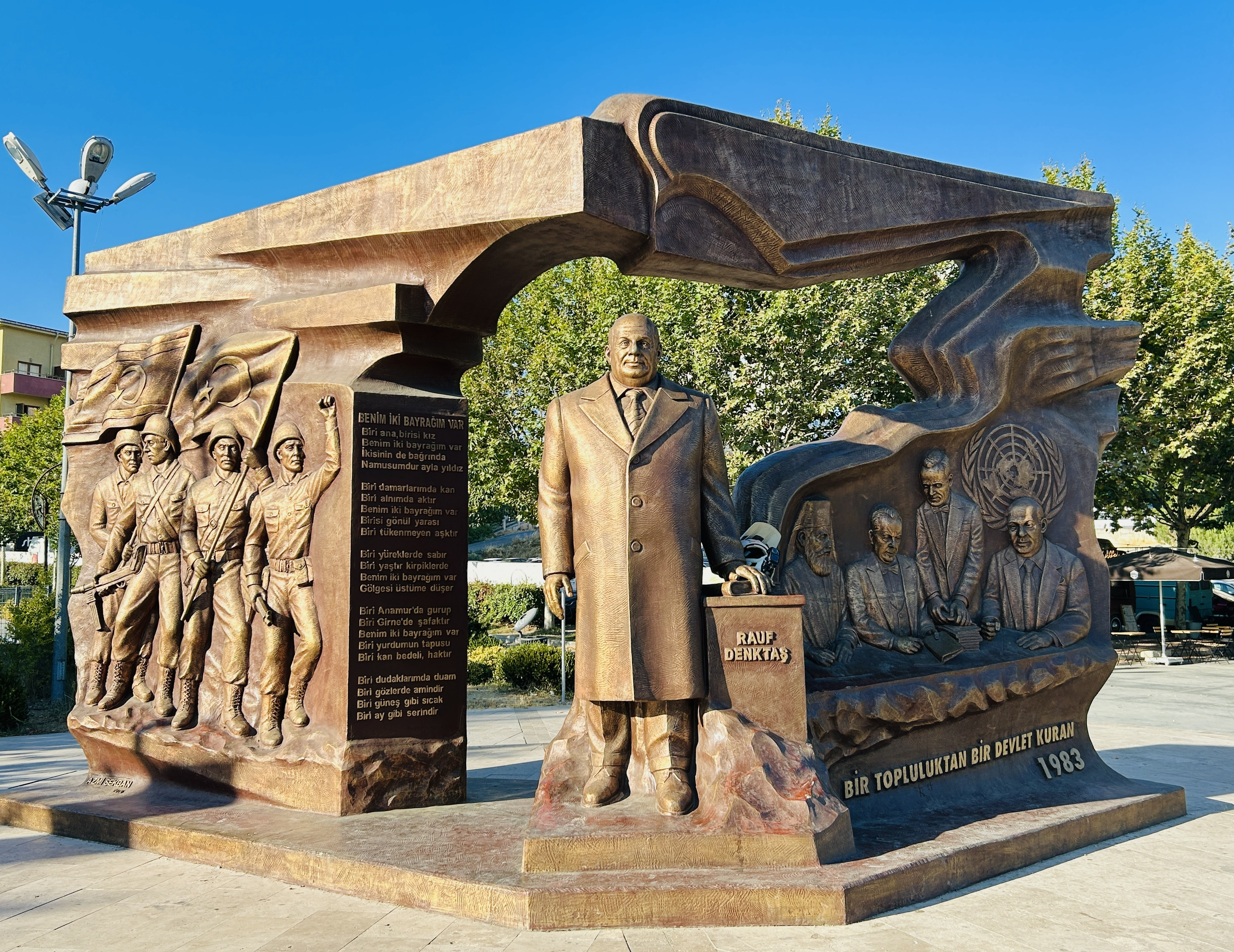
- The monument in 2025
- 41°0′27.6″N 28°38′10.6″E

Cyprus Monument is a sculpture located in the Beylikdüzü district of Istanbul. It was built by sculptor Azmi Sekban. The monument is inside the Yaşam Vadisi Park. On the left side of the monumental statue, Turkish soldiers participating in the Turkish invasion of Cyprus are depicted and in the middle, there is Rauf Denktaş, the founder and first President of the Turkish Republic of Northern Cyprus. On the right, the London and Zürich Agreements, signed on 19 February 1959, which is the agreement that guaranteed the independence and territorial integrity of Cyprus, is depicted.

The monument was highly criticized by ultranationalist Turks, due to Makarios III, the first president of the Republic of Cyprus, also being depicted on the sculpture. The Cyprus Monument was attacked and damaged.

== See also ==
- List of public art in Istanbul
