= Atatürk Monument (Kadıköy) =

Sculpture in Istanbul, Turkey

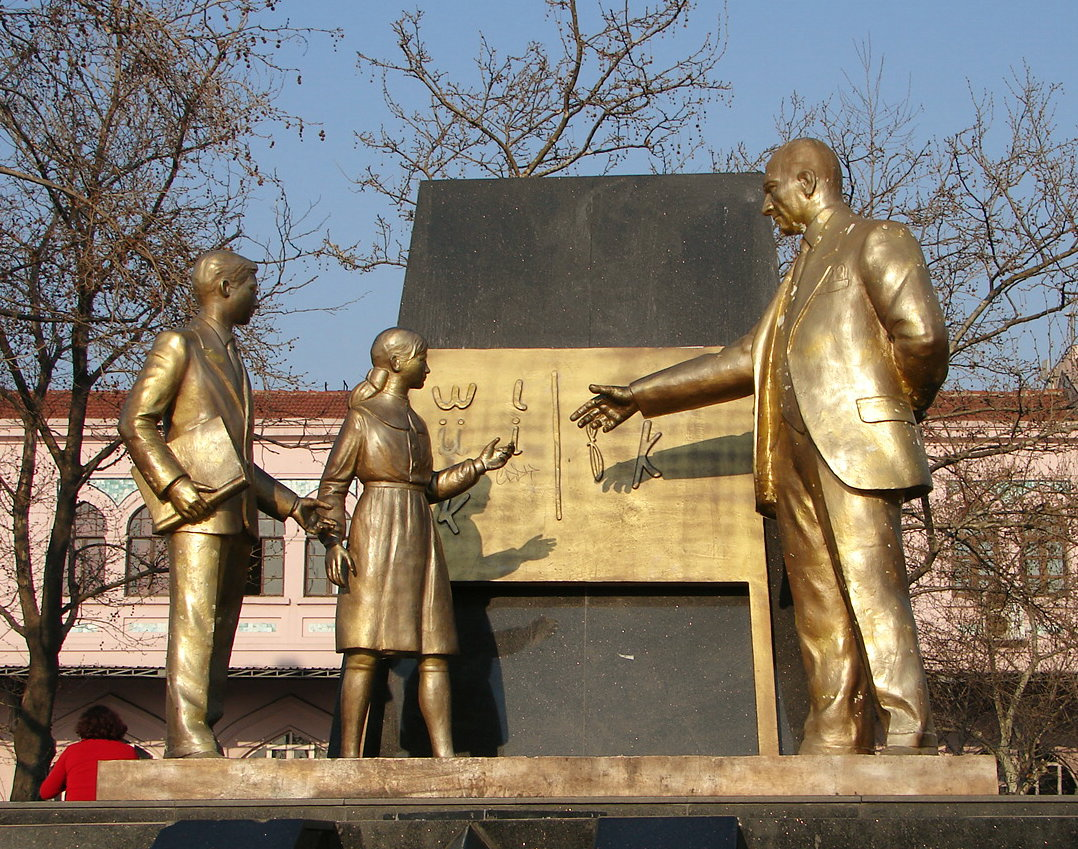
- The monument in 2007
- Location: Istanbul, Turkey

The Atatürk Monument is installed in Kadıköy, Istanbul, Turkey.

== See also ==
- Bust of Atatürk
- List of public art in Istanbul
