= Statue of Süreyya İlmen =

Sculpture in Istanbul, Turkey

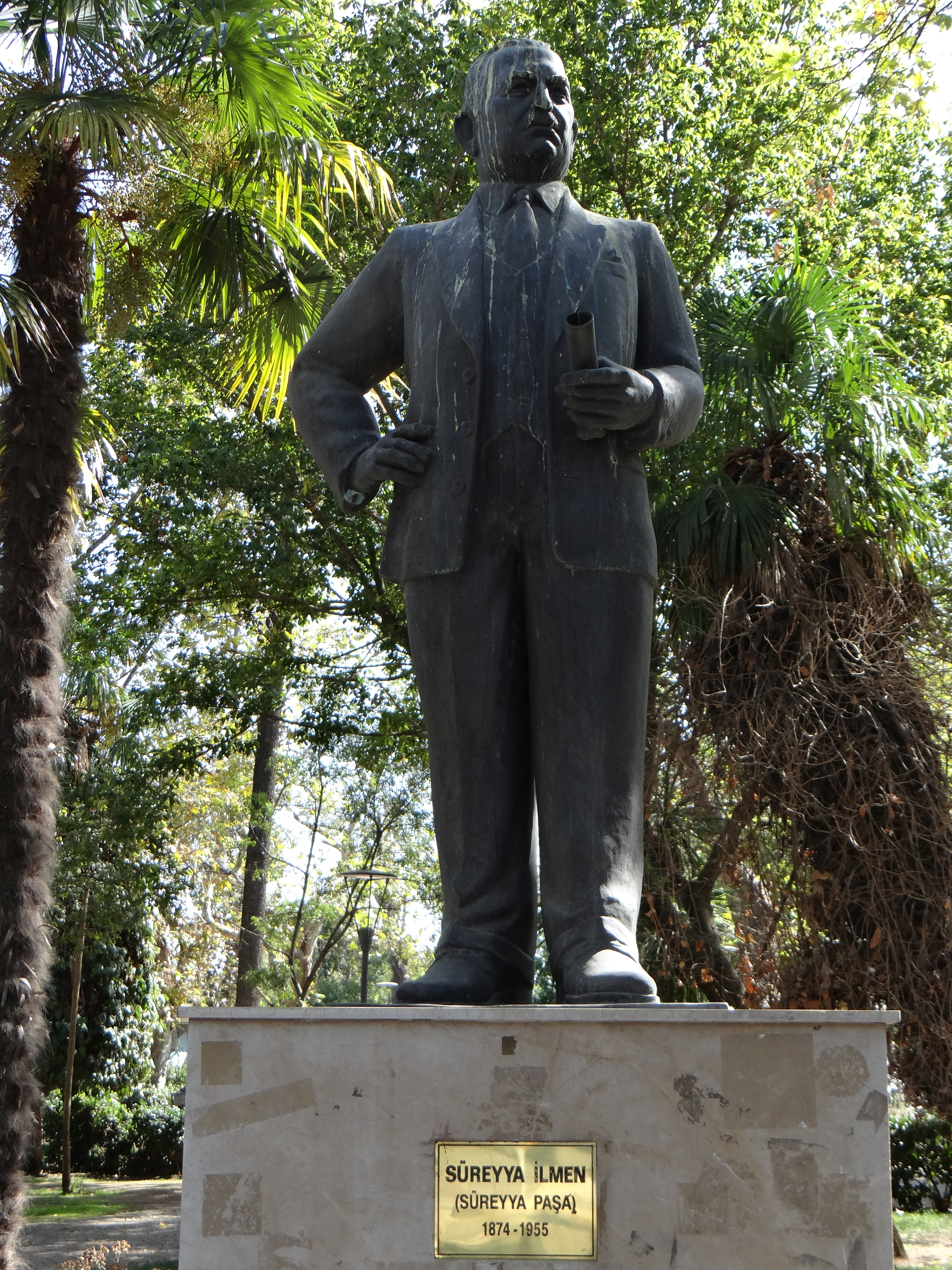
- The statue in 2021
- Artist: Rahmi Aksungur’un
- Year: 2013
- Subject: Süreyya İlmen
- Location: Istanbul, Turkey; 40°59′13″N 29°02′01″E

A statue of Süreyya İlmen is installed in Kadıköy's Yoğurtçu Park, in Istanbul, Turkey. Rahmi Aksungur’un created this memorial in 2013.

== See also ==
- 2013 in art
- List of public art in Istanbul
