= Statue of Peace, Istanbul =

Monument in Istanbul, Turkey

Statue of Peace
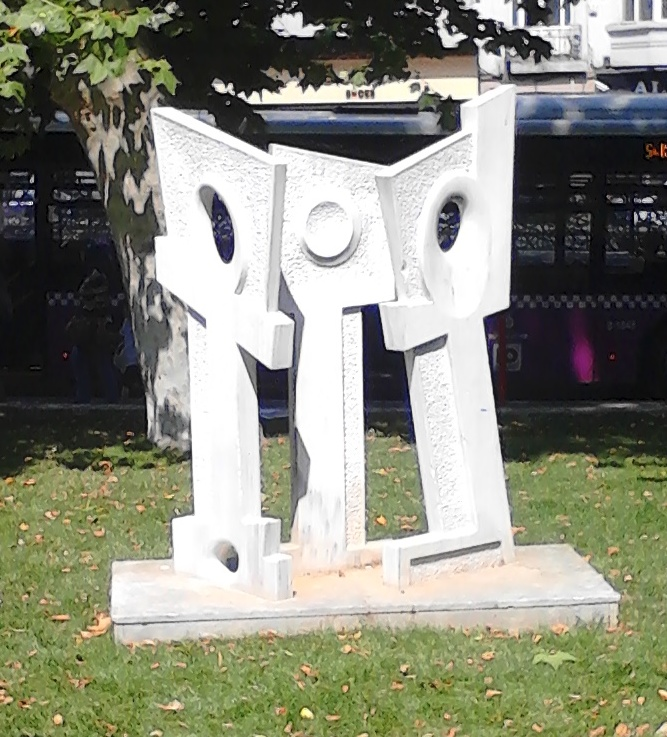
- The Statue of Peace (Lerzan Bengisu), Gezi Park, Taksim, Istanbul
- Designer: Lerzan Bengisu

The Statue of Peace (Turkish: Barış Heykeli) is a marble sculpture by Lerzan Bengisu, on exhibition in Istanbul at the Taksim Square of Gezi Park since 1976 and formed in 1974 from three shapes representing a mother and her two children.

== See also ==
- List of public art in Istanbul
