= Statue of Âşık Veysel =

Sculpture in Istanbul, Turkey

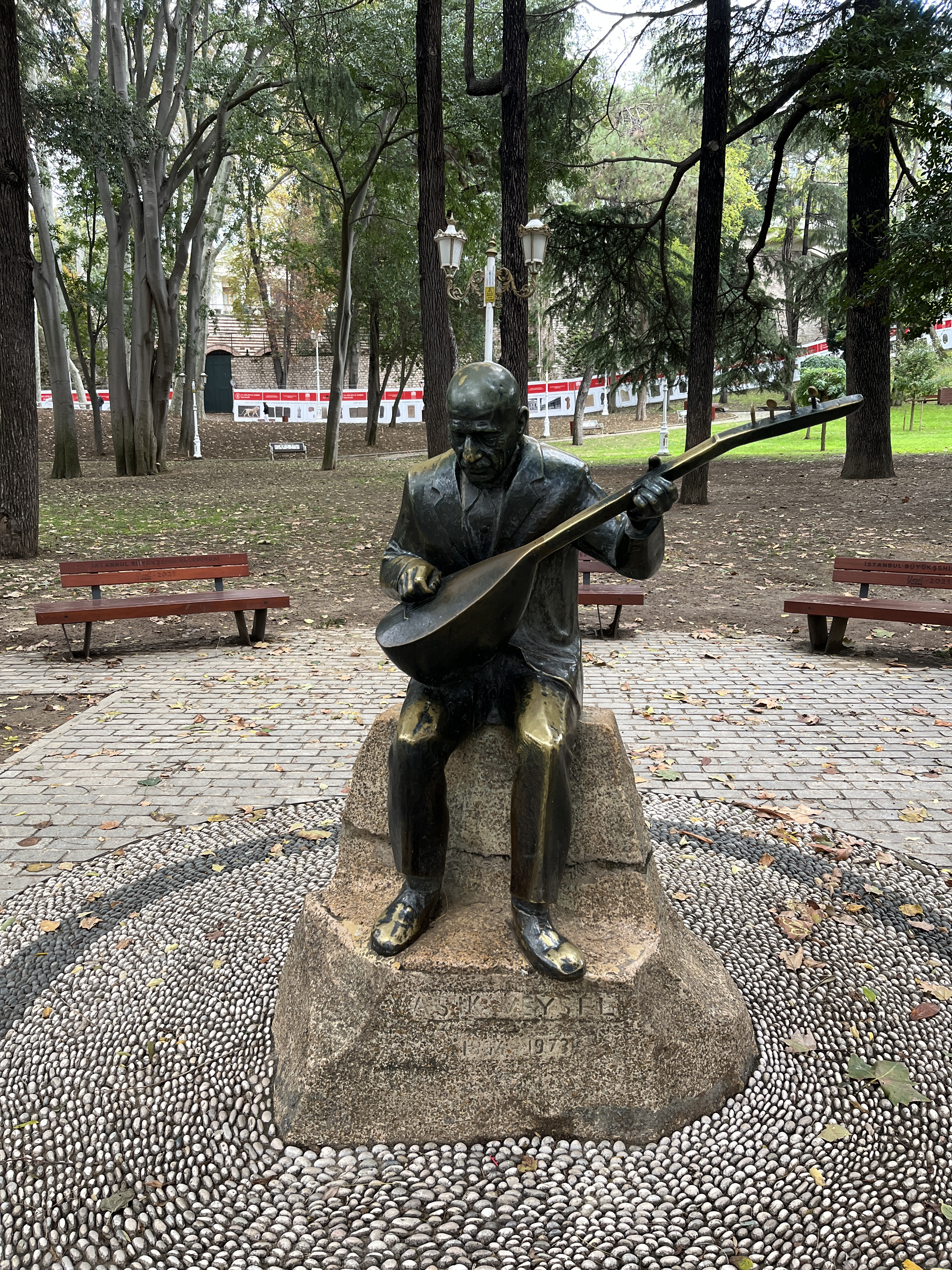
- The statue in 2023
- Subject: Âşık Veysel
- Location: Istanbul, Turkey

A statue of Âşık Veysel is installed in Fatih's Gülhane Park, in Istanbul, Turkey.

== See also ==
- List of public art in Istanbul
