= Lerzan Bengisu =

Turkish sculptor and woodcrafter

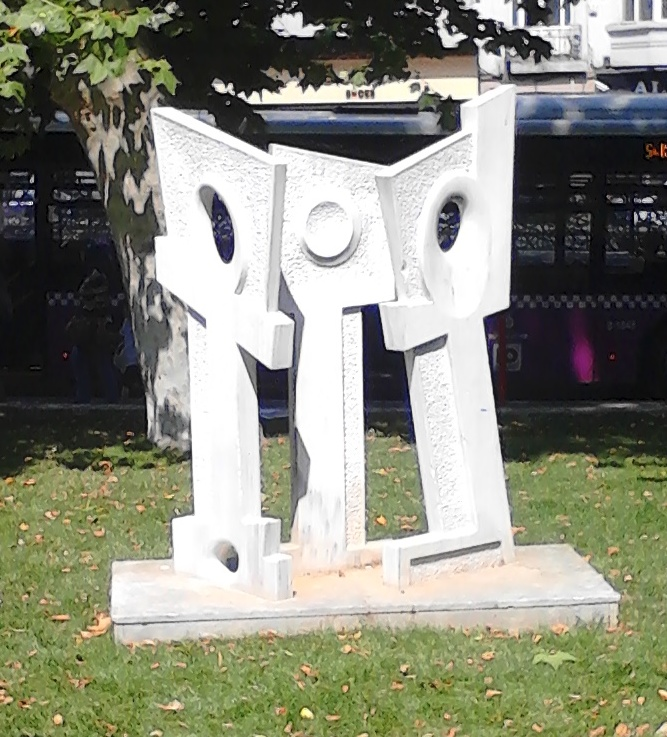
Statute of Peace by Lerzan Bengisu, Gezi Parkı, Taksim, İstanbul, Turkey

Lerzan Bengisu (1906–16 March, 1978) was a Turkish sculptor and woodcrafter.

== Life ==
She was born in Istanbul in 1906. She is the wife of Prof. Dr. Naci Bengisu and the mother of Prof. Dr. Ünal Bengisu. She died in 1978 in Istanbul and was buried in the Zincirlikuyu Cemetery.

== Work ==
She considered to be among the contemporary Turkish sculptors of the Republican era. In the first phase of her art career she worked with tree branches creating decorative works and also wood figures. She would shine and polish the surfaces of dried tree bodies. Later on she worked on balanced and uniform works preserving the shape integrity.

She was a member of the International Association of Soroptimists and of the Woman Artists Union. She had exhibits both in Turkey and abroad and received the State exhibition award.

In one of the photos of her in the archive of the Architecture Museum she appears net to Hadi Bara, Müfide Çalık, Edip Hakkı Köseoğlu, İlhan Koman and Şadi Çalık.

== Sculptures ==
Some of her well known sculptures include:

- Barış (1974)
