= Yoğurtçu Fountain =

Fountain in Istanbul, Turkey

Coordinates: 40.983613°N 29.033245°E

- Yoğurtçu Çeşmesi
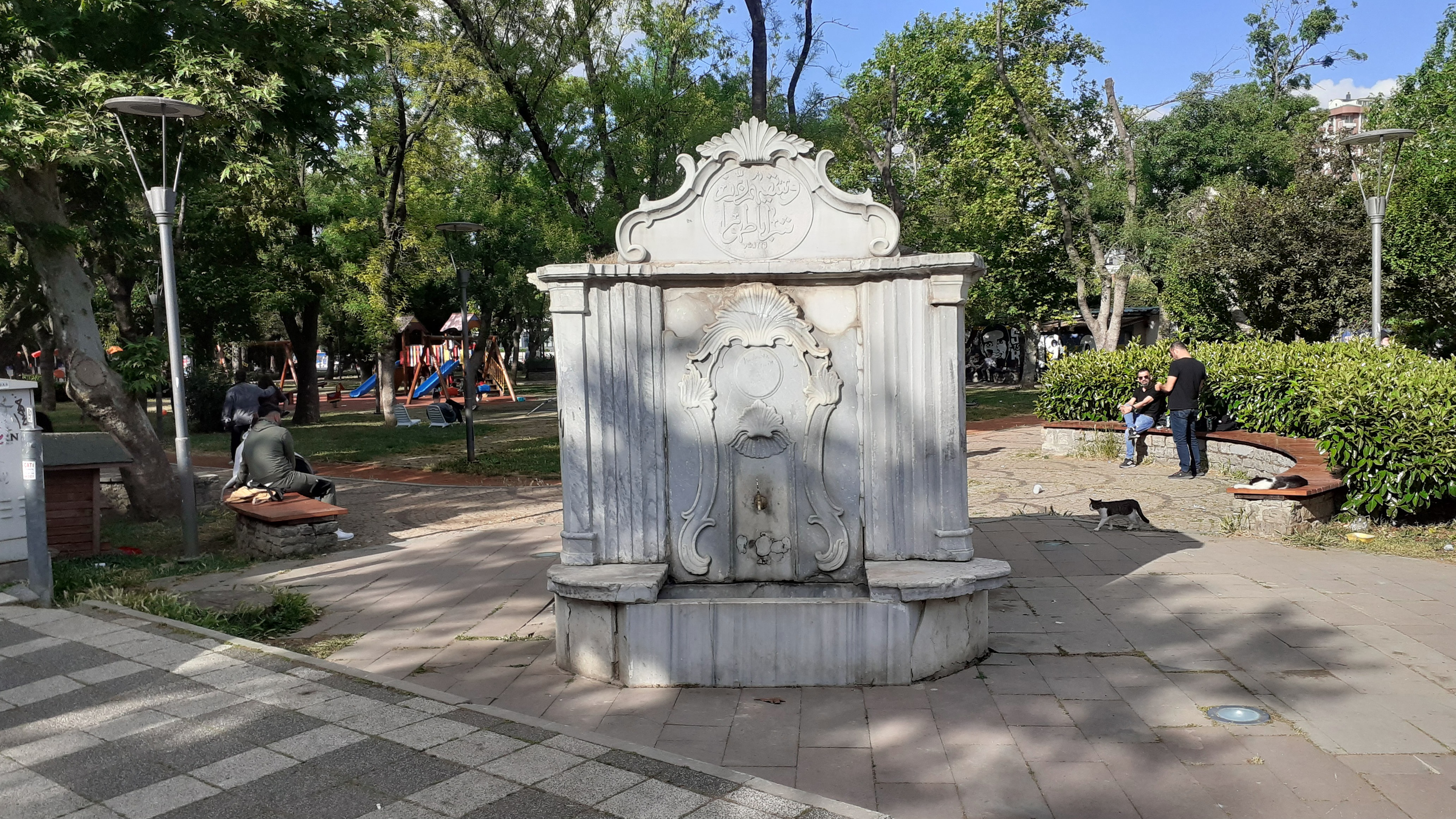
- The fountain in 2022
- Location: Yoğurtçu Park
- Interactive map of Yoğurtçu Fountain

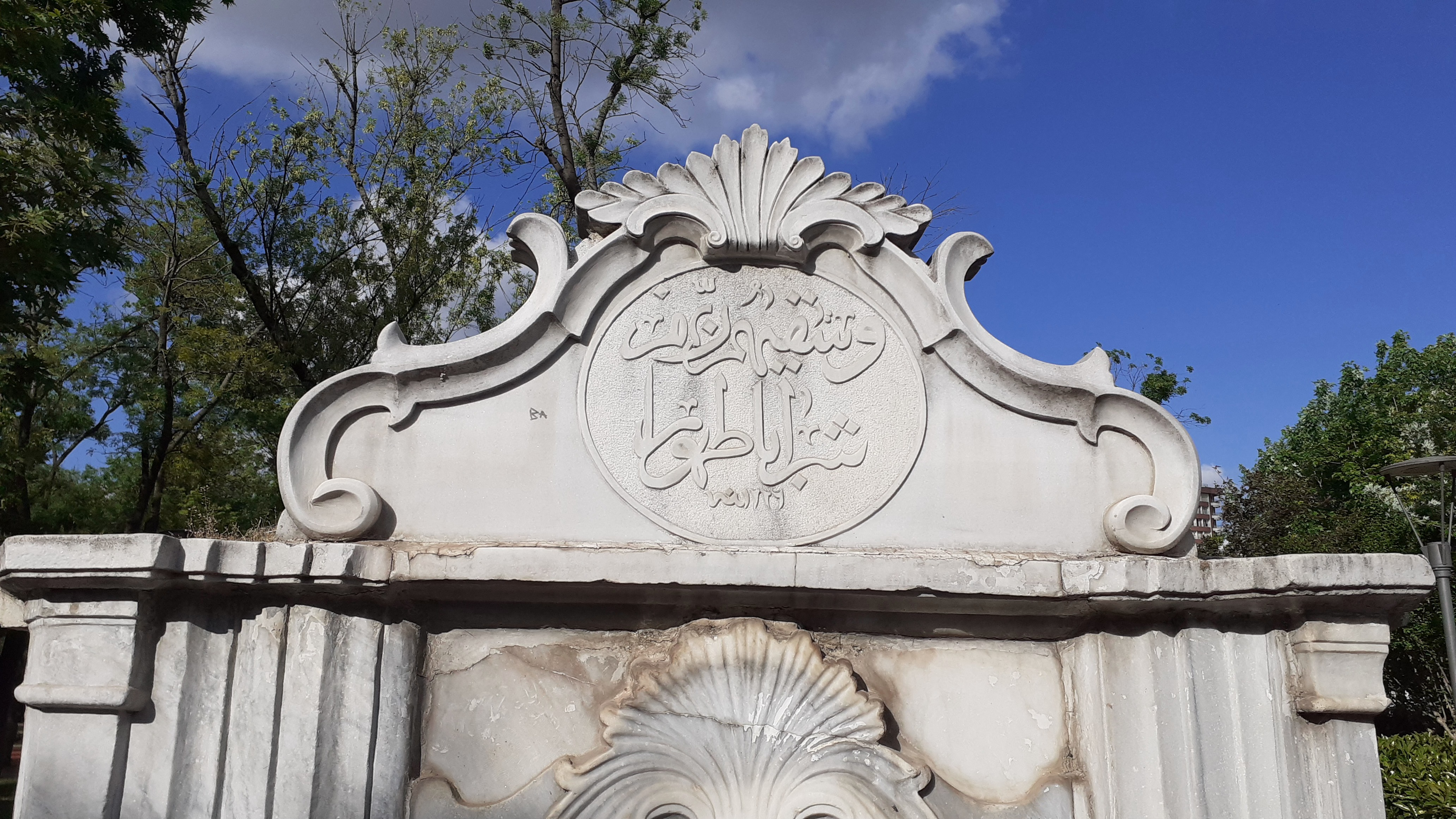
Yoğurtçu Fountain (2022)

Yoğurtçu Fountain or Yoğurtçu Park Fountain is a fountain in the Kadıköy's Yoğurtçu Park, in Istanbul, Turkey.

== See also ==
- List of fountains in Istanbul
