= Statue of Fikret Mualla Saygı =

Sculpture and memorial in Istanbul, Turkey

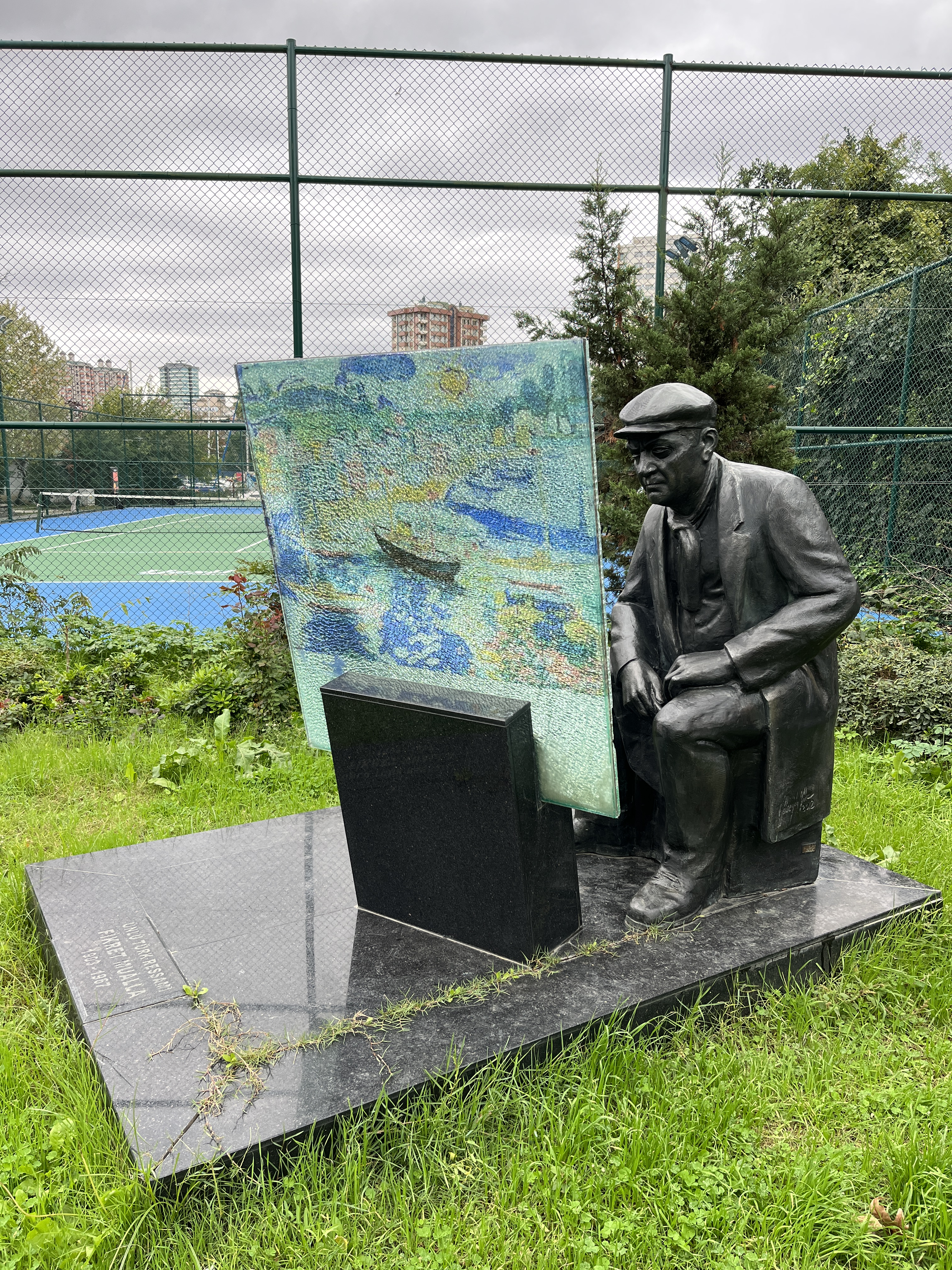
- The statue in 2023
- Subject: Fikret Mualla Saygı
- Location: Istanbul, Turkey

A statue of Fikret Mualla Saygı is installed in Kadıköy's Yoğurtçu Park, in Istanbul, Turkey.
