= Statue of Eda Erdem =

Statue of Turkish volleyball player in Turkey

- Eda Erdem Heykeli
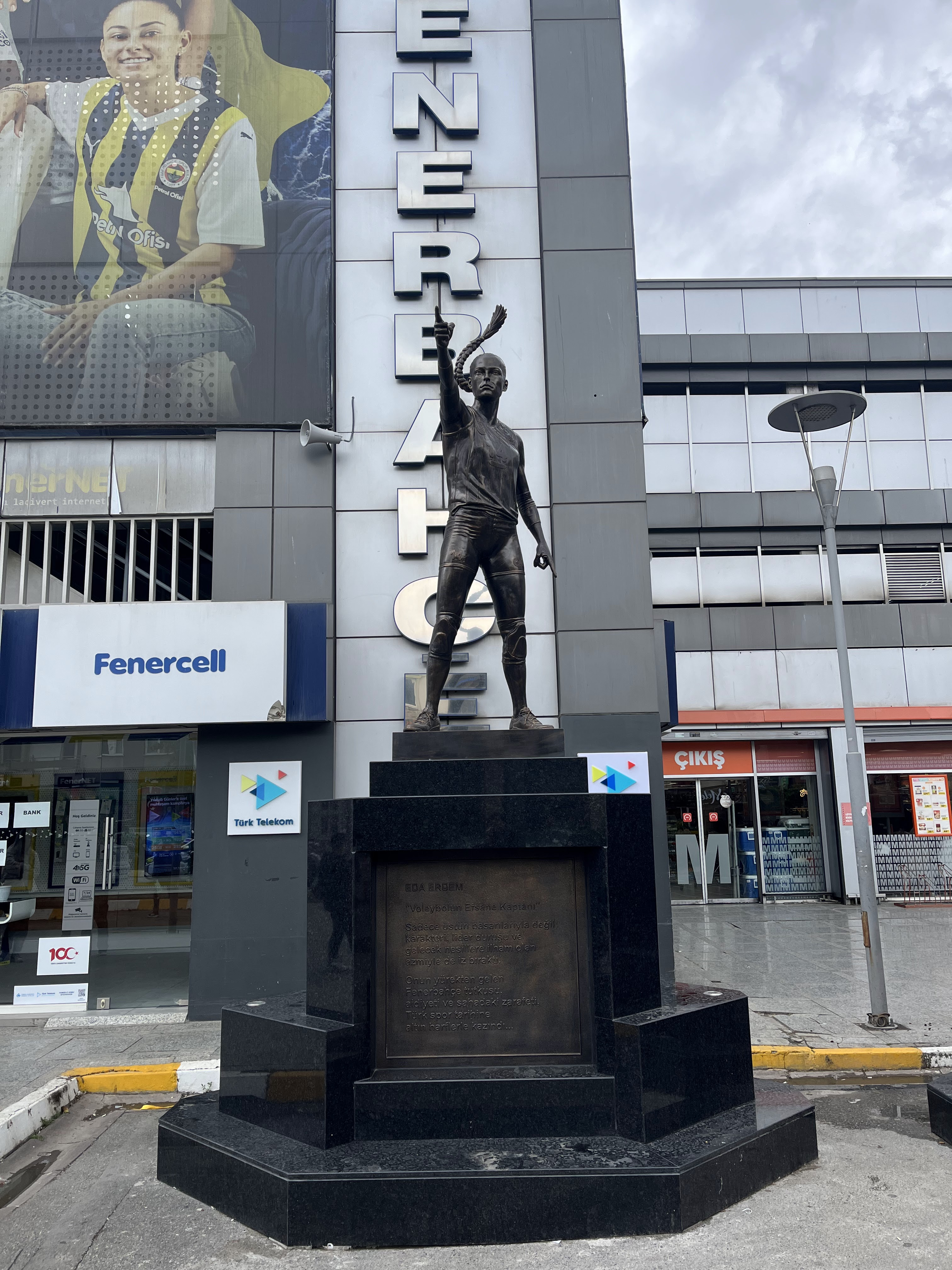
- Interactive map of Statue of Eda Erdem
- Location: Şükrü Saracoğlu Stadium, Kadıköy, Istanbul, Turkey
- Coordinates: 40.98772°N 29.03587°E
- Designer: Pınar Öktem Doğan
- Type: Statue
- Material: Bronze
- Opening date: 8 March 2024; 2 years ago
- Dedicated to: Eda Erdem Dündar

The Statue of Eda Erdem (Turkish: Eda Erdem Heykeli) is a statue of the Turkish women's volleyball player Eda Erdem situated in front of the Şükrü Saracoğlu Stadium in Istanbul, Turkey. It was unveiled in 2024.

== Background ==
Eda Erdem Dündar (born 1987) has been playing for the Turkish Women's Volleyball League club Fenerbahçe in Istanbul since 2008, and captains Fenerbahçe and the national team.

== History ==
Sponsored by Acıbadem Healthcare Group, the statue of Eda Erdem was created by the Turkish architect and sculptor Pınar Öktem Doğan, based on a photograph taken during the 2019 Women's European Volleyball Championship by Turkish Volleyball Federation photojournalist Mert Bülent Uçma. It was erected at the area in front of the Şükrü Saracoğlu Stadium, home ground of Fenerbahçe Football. The statue was unveiled in a ceremony attended by Eda Erdem Dündar and her family, high sport officials and politicians as well as club member sportspeople on 8 March 2024, the International Women's Day, at which the anthem, composed by Fenerbahçe Volleyball supporters for Eda Erdem, was performed.

== Statue ==
An inscription on the base of the full-length statue has following text (in English translation):

"Legendary captain of volleyball,
Not only with her outstanding achievements,
She also left her mark with her character, leadership stance and determination that inspired future generations,
Her heartfelt passion for Fenerbahçe,
Her loyalty and elegance on the court were engraved in Turkish sports history in golden letters..."

== See also ==
- 2024 in art
- List of public art in Istanbul
