= Statue of Yunus Emre =

Sculpture in Istanbul, Turkey

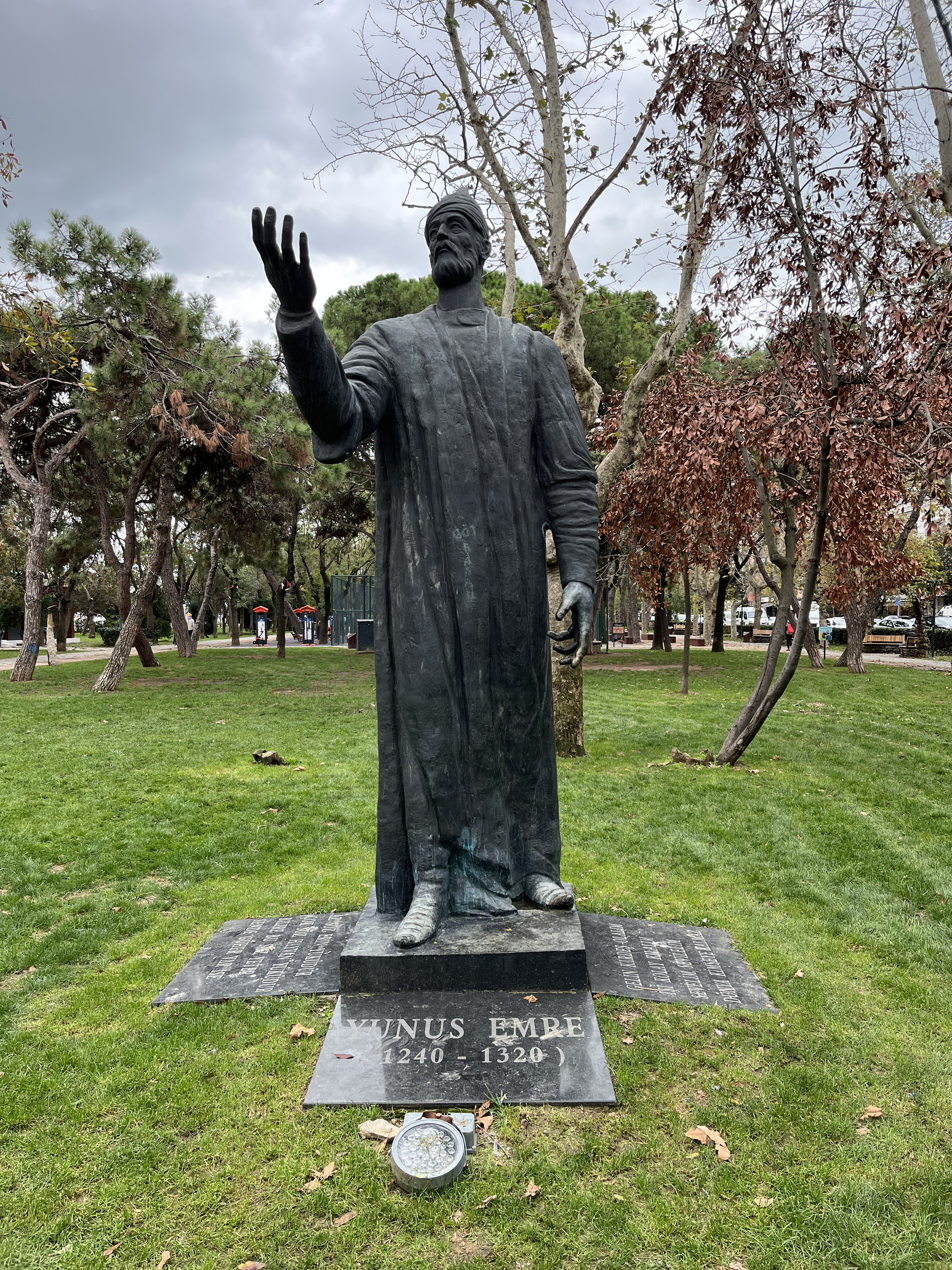
- The statue in 2023
- Subject: Yunus Emre
- Location: Istanbul, Turkey

A statue of Yunus Emre is installed in Kadıköy's Yoğurtçu Park, in Istanbul, Turkey.
