= Can Bartu =

Turkish footballer and basketball player (1936–2019)

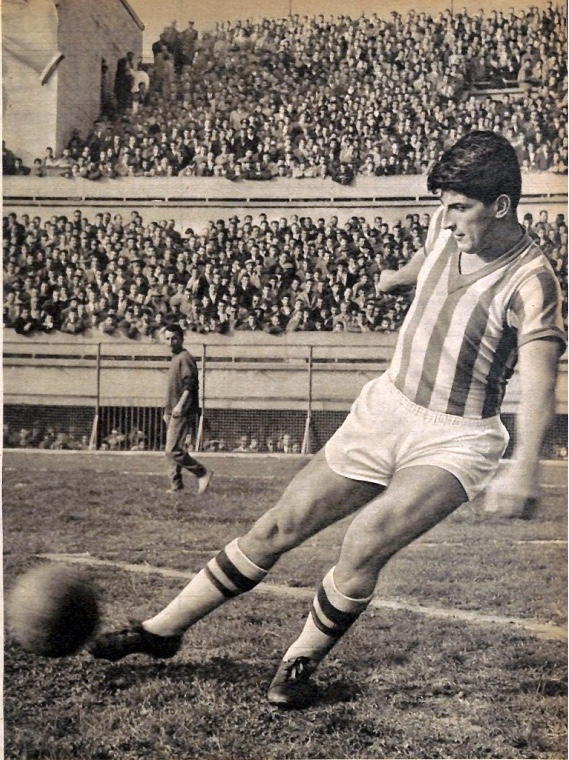
- Bartu in 1959

Personal information
- Full name: Can Bartu
- Date of birth: 31 January 1936
- Place of birth: Istanbul, Turkey
- Date of death: 11 April 2019 (aged 83)
- Place of death: Istanbul, Turkey
- Positions: Attacking midfielder; left winger

Youth career
- ?–1955: Fenerbahçe

Senior career*
Years	Team	Apps	(Gls)
1955–1961	Fenerbahçe	326	(173)
1961–1962	Fiorentina	14	(2)
1962–1963	Venezia	30	(8)
1963–1964	Fiorentina	10	(0)
1964–1967	Lazio	46	(4)
1967–1970	Fenerbahçe	46	(8)
Total		472	(195)

International career
1956–1968	Turkey	26	(6)
- * Club domestic league appearances and goals

Can Bartu (31 January 1936 – 11 April 2019) was a Turkish basketball and football player of Circassian origin. He was the first Turkish footballer to play a final in Europe. His statue was erected in Istanbul. After retirement, he also worked as a pundit and sports journalist.

== Career ==
He started to play basketball for Fenerbahçe and was a six-time international representative with the national basketball team. He was invited by the football coach Fikret Arıcan to play football beside basketball. On 25 January 1957, Bartu played football against Beyoğluspor, scoring two goals and assisted two more in an eventual 4–0 victory. Then, that evening, Bartu scored 10 points, including a buzzer beater with three seconds remaining, in a basketball game to help Fenerbahçe win 44–43. He also played 26 times for the Turkey national football team.

In 1961, Bartu transferred to ACF Fiorentina in Italy, where he became the first Turk to play a European final against Atlético Madrid at the 1962 Cup Winners' Cup, being given the nickname "Signor" by the Italian press as a result. Later on, he played for Venezia A.C. in 1962 and S.S. Lazio in 1964.

After successful seasons in Italy, Bartu returned to Turkey in 1967 to play in his former club Fenerbahçe for more three years. Overall, Bartu played 326 games with Fenerbahçe and scored 162 goals. He became four-time Turkish Super League champion in 1959, 1961, 1968 and 1970 with Fenerbahçe.

He retired from active sport in 1970 and continued his career as a sports journalist writing for the newspaper Hürriyet.

He also took part on a national TV channel in Turkey as a commentator.

Bartu was the UEFA Cup ambassador of Turkey in 2008/2009 season, when the Şükrü Saracoğlu Stadium in Istanbul hosted the final.

Bartu replaced the injured Turgay Şeren at 77' and played as a goalkeeper against Romania on 2 November 1958 in București during a European Cup game.

== Personal life and death ==
Bartu was nicknamed "Sinyor" (from Italian "Signor" for nobleman). After his retirement, he was a columnist for the daily Hürriyet.

Can Bartu died at the age of 83 on 11 April 2019. He was interred at the Karacaahmet Cemetery following a memorial ceremony held at the Şükrü Saracoğlu Stadium, the home ground of Fenerbahçe S.K., and the religious funeral at the Marmara İlahiyat Mosque in Üsküdar.

== Career statistics ==
=== International goals ===
#	Date	Venue	Opponent	Score	Result	Competition
1.	8 December 1957	19 Mayıs Stadium, Ankara, Turkey	Belgium	1–1	Draw	Friendly
2.	1 November 1964	19 Mayıs Stadium, Ankara, Turkey	Tunisia	4–1	Win	Friendly
3.	14 September 1969	19 Mayıs Stadium, Ankara, Turkey	Pakistan	4–2	Win	1969 RCD Cup
4.	14 September 1969	19 Mayıs Stadium, Ankara, Turkey	Pakistan	4–2	Win	1969 RCD Cup
5.	17 September 1969	19 Mayıs Stadium, Ankara, Turkey	Iran	4–0	Win	1969 RCD Cup
6.	24 September 1969	Mithatpaşa Stadium, Istanbul, Turkey	Switzerland	3–0	Win	Friendly
Correct as of 10 May 2019

== Legacy ==
The current training facilities of the Fenerbahçe senior football team are named after Bartu.

== Honours ==
Fenerbahçe

- Süper Lig: 1959, 1960–61, 1967–68, 1969–70
- Turkish Cup: 1967-68
- Presidential Cup: 1968
- Balkans Cup: 1966–67
