= Statue of Lefter Küçükandonyadis =

Sculpture in Istanbul, Turkey

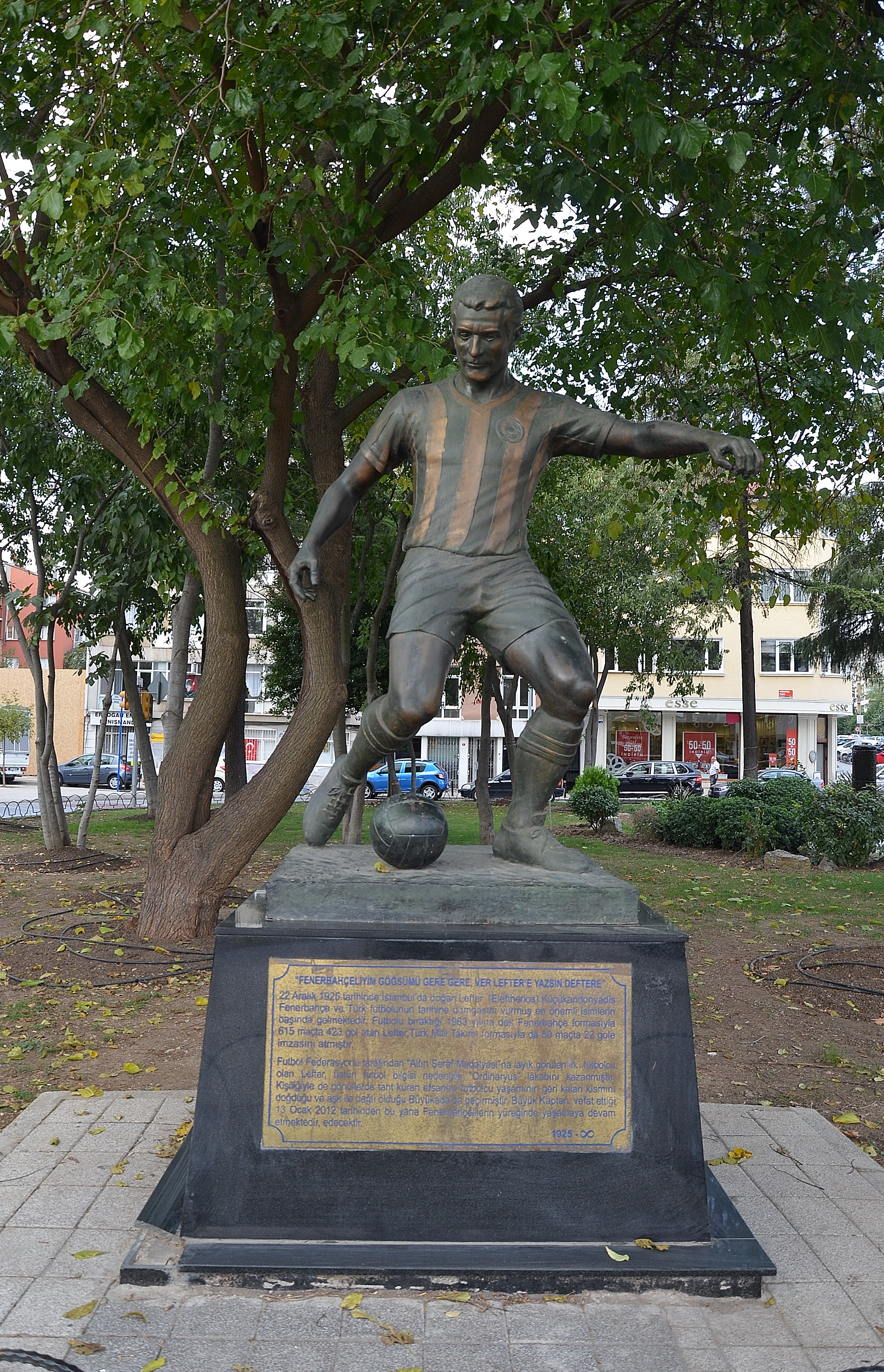
- The statue in 2014
- Subject: Lefter Küçükandonyadis
- Location: Istanbul, Turkey

A statue of Lefter Küçükandonyadis is installed Kadıköy's Yoğurtçu Park, in Istanbul, Turkey. The sculpture was unveiled in 2009.

== See also ==
- 2009 in art
- List of public art in Istanbul
