= Bust of Atatürk =

Sculpture in Istanbul, Turkey

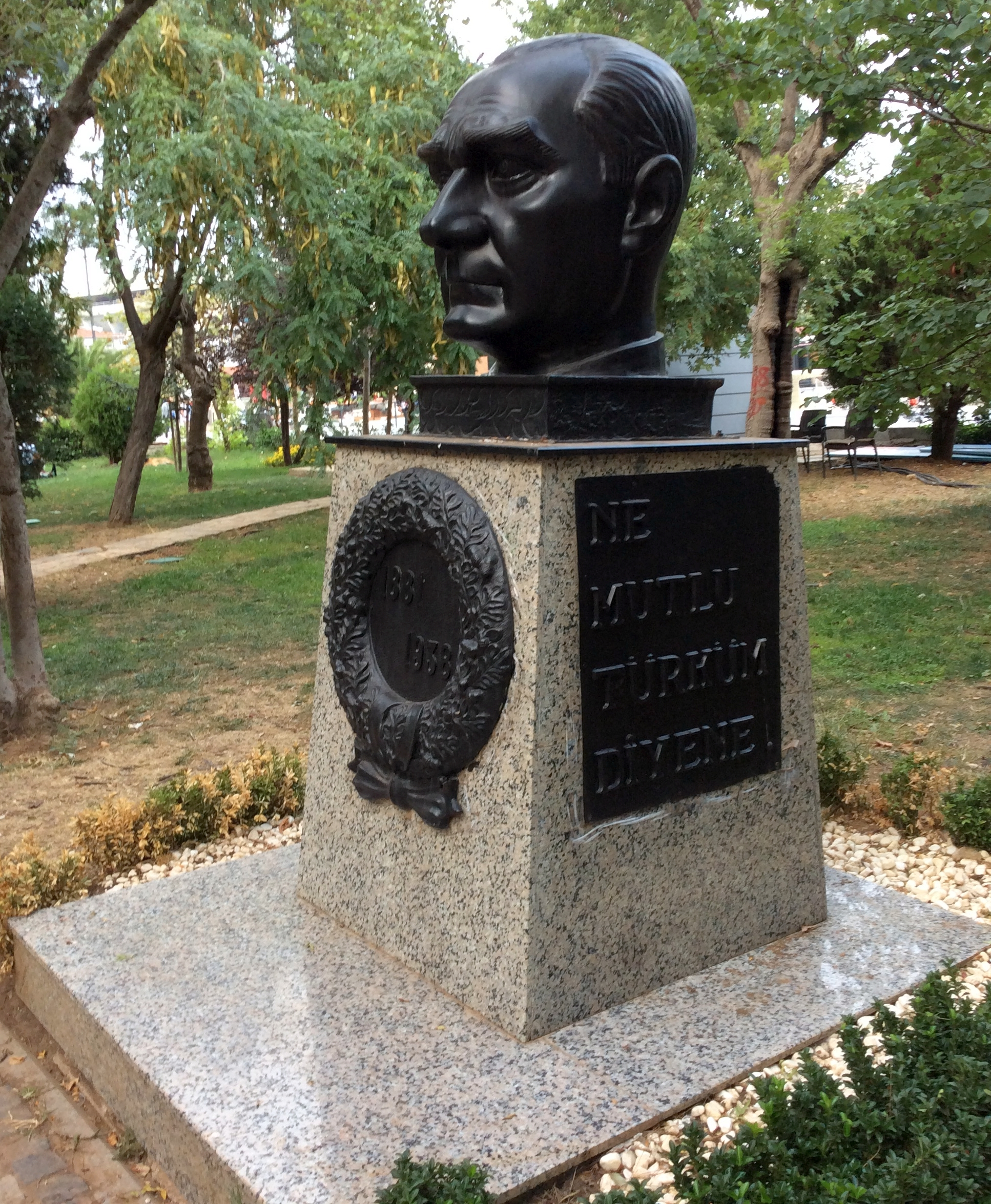
- The bust in 2021
- Subject: Mustafa Kemal Atatürk
- Location: Istanbul, Turkey

A bust of Mustafa Kemal Atatürk is installed in Kadıköy's Yoğurtçu Park, in Istanbul, Turkey.

== See also ==
- Atatürk Monument (Kadıköy)
- List of public art in Istanbul
