= Fikret Mualla Saygı =

20th-century avant-garde painter of Turkish descent

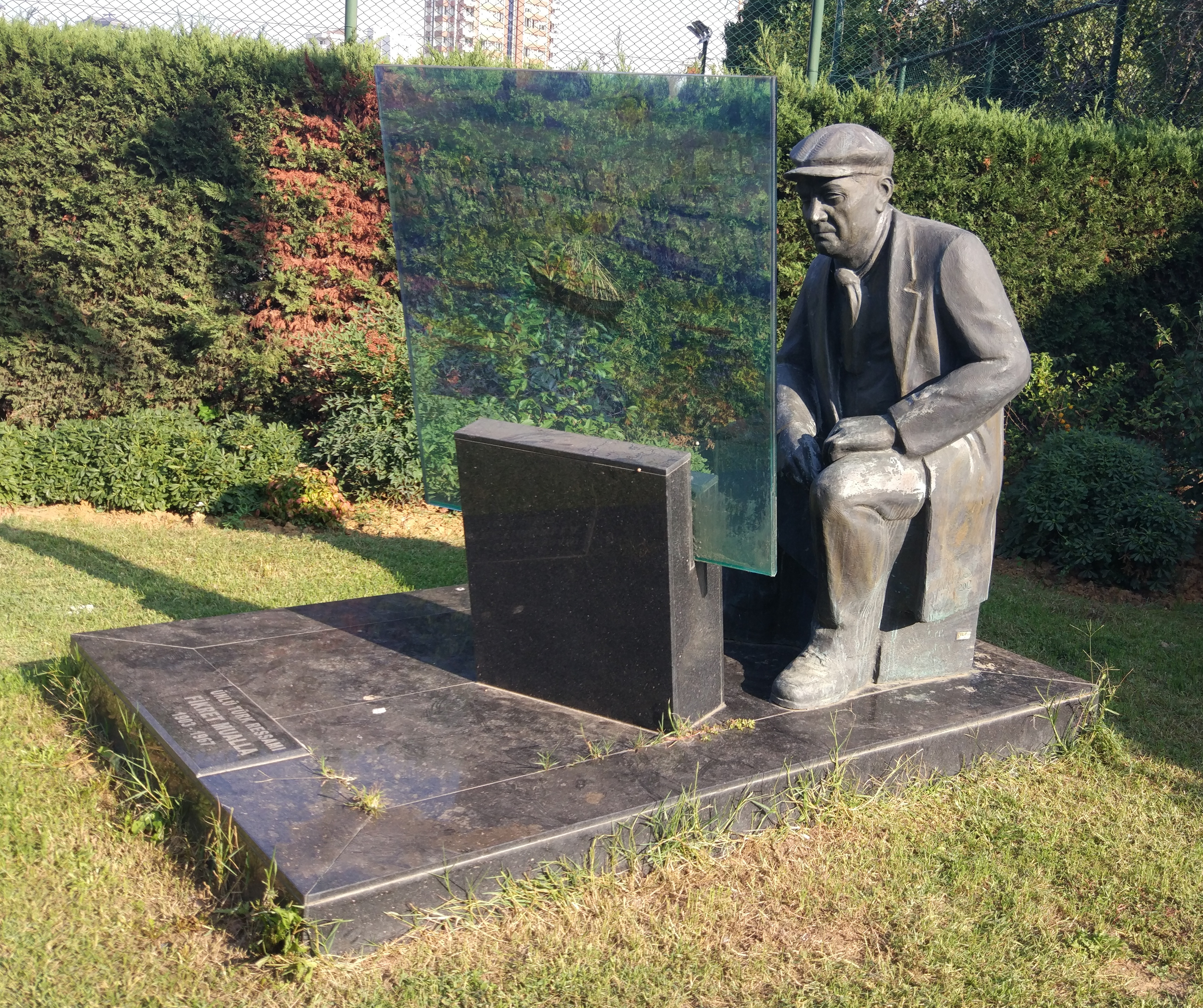
Statue of Fikret Muallâ in Moda, Kadıköy

Fikret Muallâ Saygı (July 20, 1903 in Kadıköy, Istanbul, Ottoman Empire – July 20, 1967, in Reillanne, France) was a 20th-century avant-garde painter of Turkish descent. His work reflects influences from Expressionism and Fauvism, with subject matter focusing on Paris street life, social gatherings such as cafés and circuses.

== Early life ==
He was born in Kadıköy, Istanbul, but lived and worked as an artist in Paris from 1939.

He was very much loved by his mother. This relationship played an important role in his later life. At the age of 12, he was crippled in his right foot when he kicked hard to imitate his uncle Hikmet Topuzer, a footballer for Fenerbahçe SK. Not long after, he lost his mother to a flu epidemic. His father remarried a very young woman, but Fikret Mualla did not accept his stepmother.

== Years in Europe ==
After high school, his father sent him to Zürich, Switzerland to study engineering. Fikret Mualla left Switzerland soon to settle in Berlin, Germany. A childhood accident, leaving Mualla with a bad physical condition, contributed to his erratic personality and mental disorder in his adult years. He was institutionalized a number of times, for alcohol dependency and extreme paranoia. In 1928, he was hospitalised in Berlin due to delirium. He then went to Paris, the capital of arts and the centre of unlimited freedom for him. However, he was forced to return home as he did not receive any more money from his father.

== Return to Turkey ==
In Istanbul, he was deemed to have normal mental health after a three-day stay in Bakırköy Psychiatric Hospital. Fikret Mualla was appointed as a teacher for drawing in a high school in Ayvalık. However, he quit this position and moved to Beyoğlu, a neighborhood in Istanbul. He tried his hand, for a while, at writing and drawing. He became friends with soprano Semiha Berksoy, writer Nazım Hikmet and painter Abidin Dino. His first exhibition in 1934 containing drawings, watercolor paintings and designs did not gain much attention. In 1936, he was hospitalised again for about a year. After his release, he decided to leave Turkey, where he felt he was not understood. Before he went to 1939 to Paris, he made around thirty oil paintings for the Turkish pavilion at the New York World's Fair asked by his close friend Abidin Dino.

== Life and work in France ==
His lifetime in Paris passed with alcohol dependency, mental alienation and cognitive dissonance. He fell in love with the female Turkish painter Hale Asaf without being reciprocated. He was put in hospital again for two months, but during this time he never stopped painting. The French model Dina Vierny saved him from being deported. In 1954, Saygı opened his first exhibition in Paris. He became friends with many renowned artists, including Pablo Picasso. He later sold a signed photo of Picasso for one bottle of wine. Following his second exhibition, he was hospitalised again.

By now, he was notorious as a drunkard and mad man, but he started to be respected as a painter. During this time, a collectioner, Madame Angles, took him under her patronage. This enabled him to earn his living by painting and selling his works. However, ill-starred, Fikret Mualla was paralyzed in 1962. He moved to Reillanne, a village in southeastern France, as cirrhosis supervened. By May 1967, he was put in a clinic after nervous disorders escalated. On the morning of July 20, he was found dead in his bed. In line with his will, his remains were brought to Turkey and were interred at Karacaahmet Cemetery in Istanbul.

Saygı is considered to be one of the representatives of Turkish arts in the 20th century, along with Abidin Dino.

== See also ==
- List of Turkish painters
