= Statue of Can Bartu =

Sculpture in Istanbul, Turkey

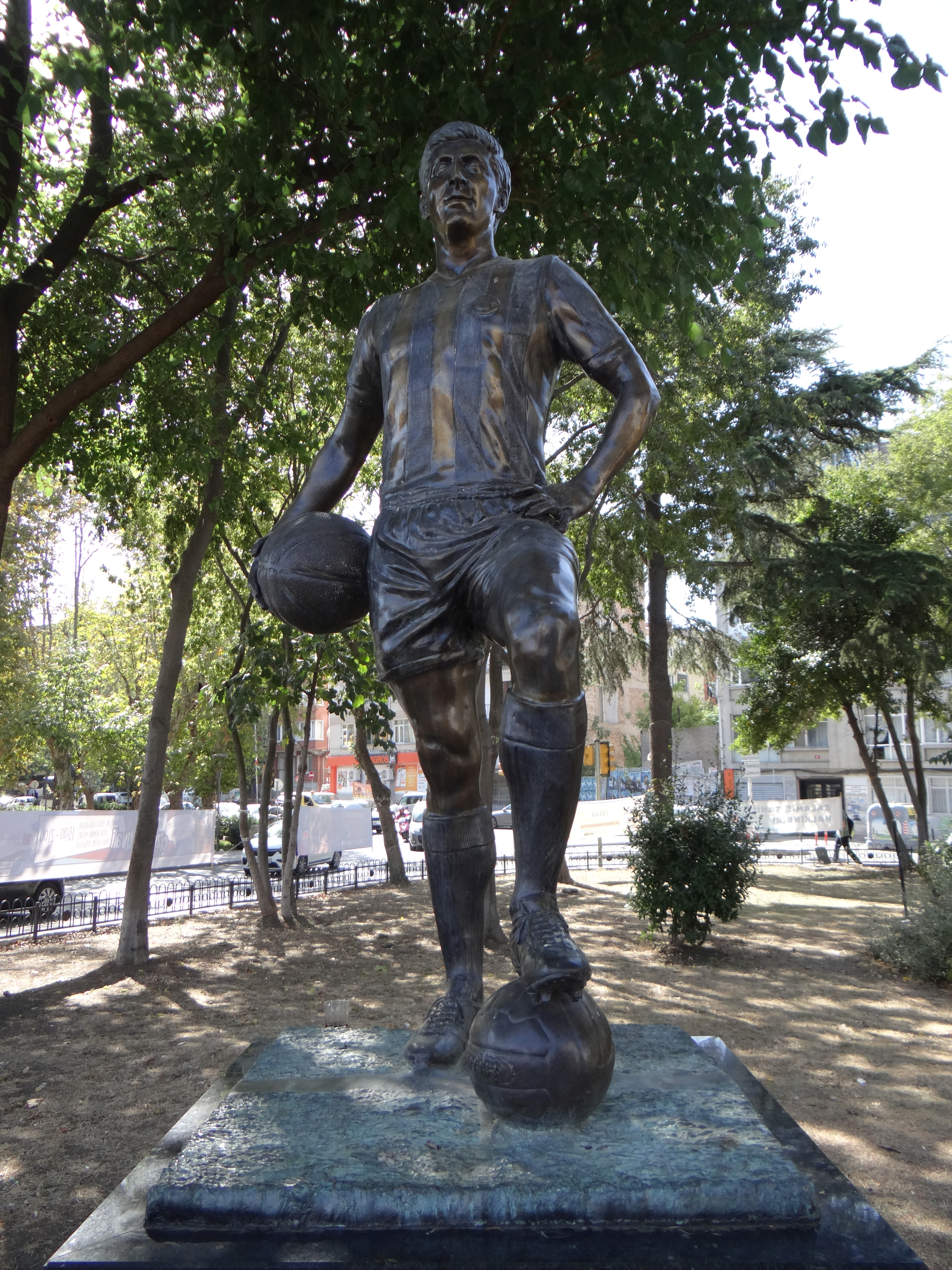
- The statue in 2021
- Subject: Can Bartu
- Location: Istanbul, Turkey

A statue of Can Bartu is installed Kadıköy's Yoğurtçu Park, in Istanbul, Turkey. The sculpture was unveiled in 2021.

== See also ==
- 2021 in art
- List of public art in Istanbul
