= Ahmet Hamdi Tanpınar Literature Museum Library =

Museum and archive in Istanbul, Turkey

- Ahmet Hamdi Tanpınar Edebiyat Müze Kütüphanesi
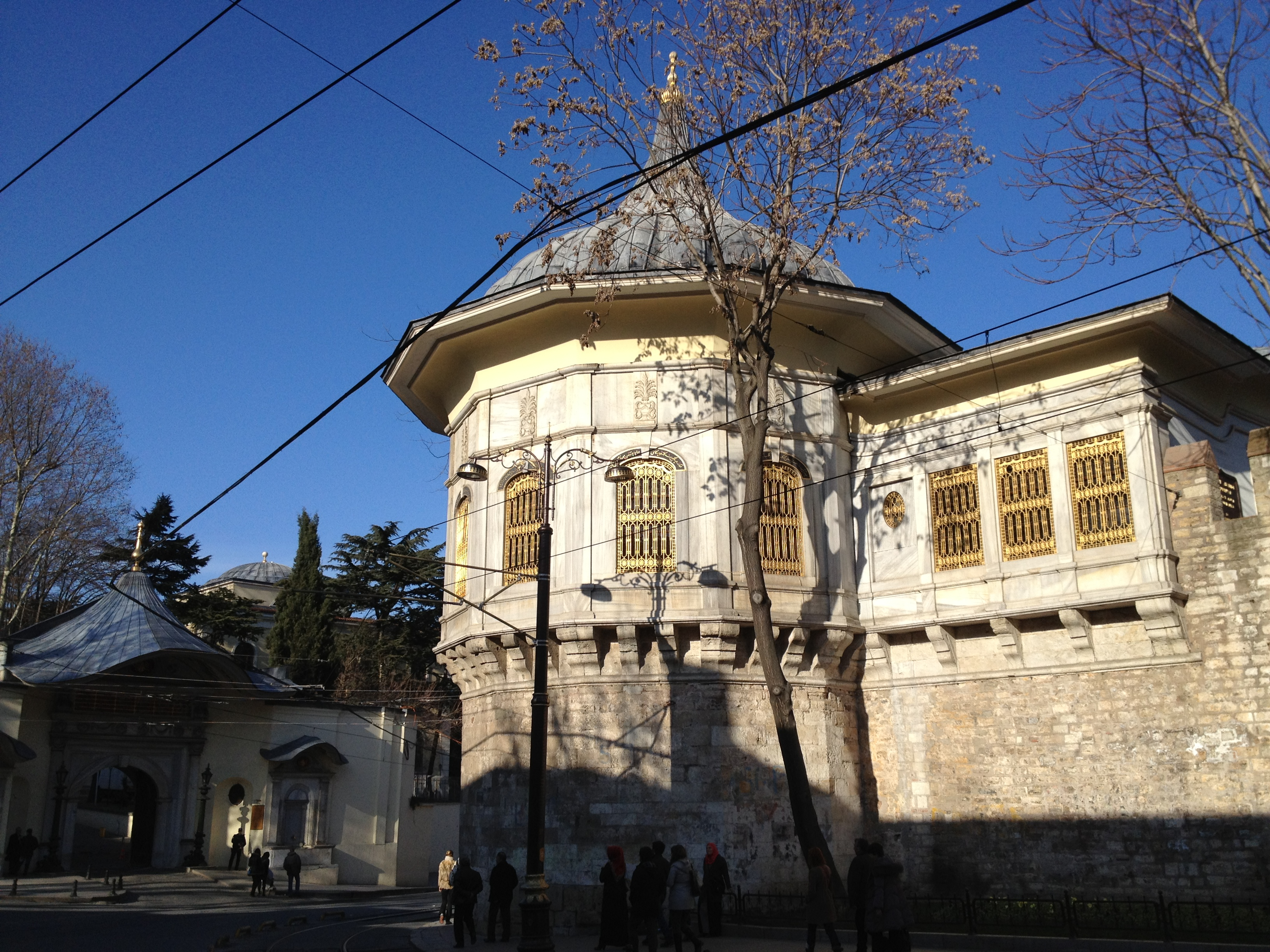
- Procession Kiosk of Topkapı Palace used as Ahmet Hamdi Tanpınar Literature Museum Library

- Location of the museum in Istanbul
- Established: November 12, 2011; 14 years ago
- Location: Gülhane Park, Fatih, Istanbul, Turkey
- Coordinates: 41.01098°N 28.97827°E
- Type: Literary, biographical
- Owner: Ministry of Culture and Tourism
- Public transit access: Tram T1 (Kabataş–Bağcılar)
- Parking: No

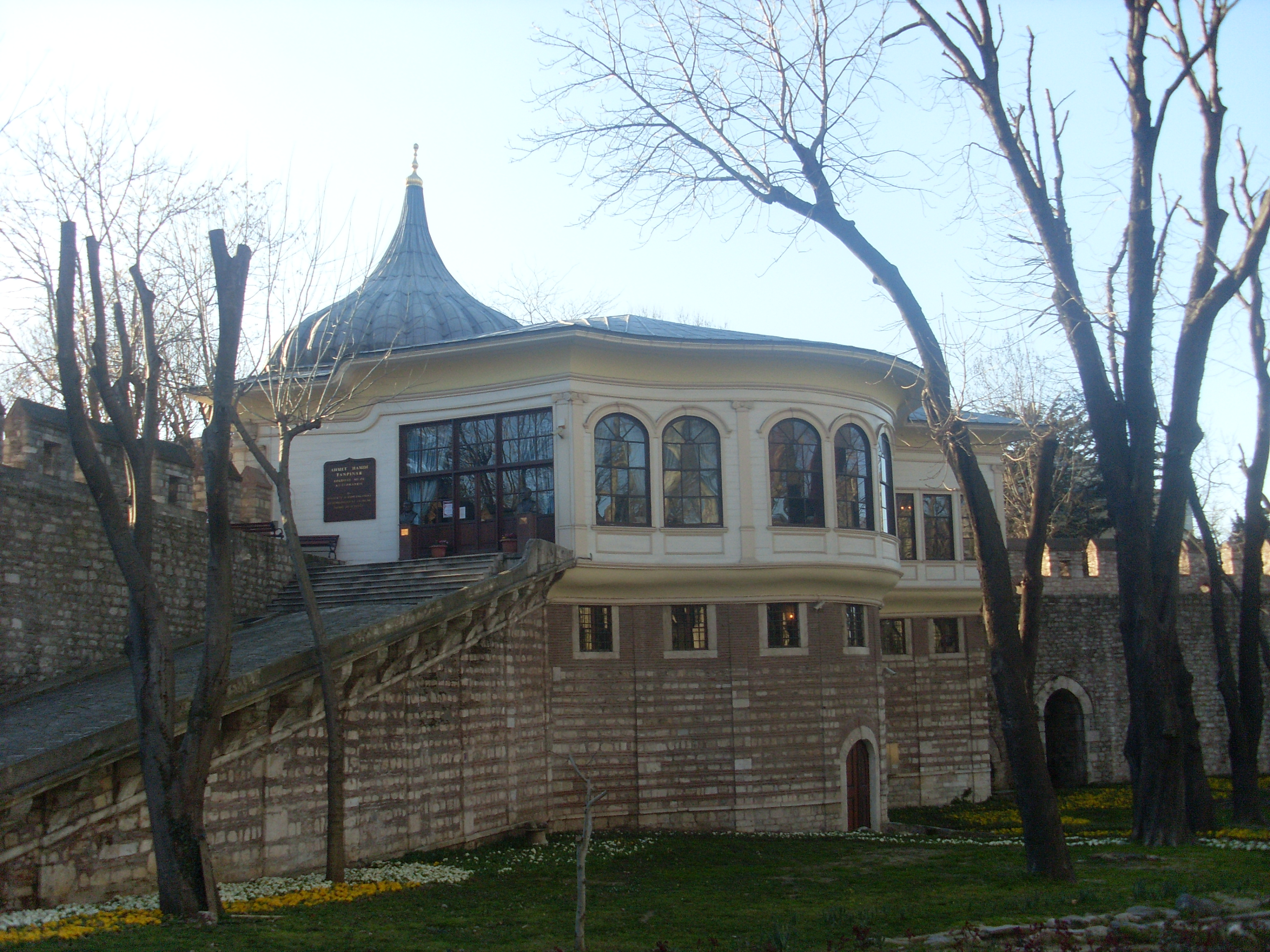
Entrance to the museum inside the Gülhane Park

The Ahmet Hamdi Tanpınar Literature Museum Library (Turkish: Ahmet Hamdi Tanpınar Edebiyat Müze Kütüphanesi) is a literary museum and archive dedicated to Turkish literature and named after the Turkish novelist and essayist Ahmet Hamdi Tanpınar (1901–1962). Located in Istanbul, Turkey, the museum was established by the Ministry of Culture and Tourism and opened on November 12, 2011.

The museum is housed in the two-storey Procession Kiosk (Turkish: Alay Köşkü), a 19th-century historic building on the outer walls of Gülhane Park that belongs to Topkapı Palace. It was used by the Ottoman sultans to accept salute of janissary soldiers parading as well as a pleasure locale. The building is situated across the Sublime Porte. It was used from the 1910s on as the center of the Fine Arts Association. From 1928 to the end 1930s, it served as a meeting place of an association dedicated to Turkish language and literature.

On the ground floor, there are two rooms and an entrance hall. The first floor houses the former throne room, in addition to two halls and three rooms. The ground floor is designed as a cafeteria, called the "Writers' Café", where prize-winning literary works are exhibited. Special corners on the upper floor are dedicated to the life and works of around 50 renowned authors native to Istanbul, with busts of some, including Nedîm (1681–1730), Yahya Kemal Beyatlı (1884–1958), Nâzım Hikmet Ran (1902–1963), Necip Fazıl Kısakürek (1904–1983), Aziz Nesin (1915–1995), Orhan Pamuk (born 1952), Ayşe Kulin (born 1941), Zülfü Livaneli (born 1946) and Doğan Hızlan (born 1937) in addition to Tanpınar. It is also a place for discussions on various authors, poetry performances, literature award ceremonies, and writing workshops. The library of the museum accommodates over 8,000 books, including about 1,000 books on Istanbul as well as volumes of more than 100 periodicals on literature and other fields of the arts. The museum hosts also temporary art exhibitions. It is the fourth of its kind in Turkey after the literature museums in Ankara, Adana and Diyarbakır.

The museum library is accessible by the public transport line Tram T1 (Kabataş–Bağcılar), and is open on weekdays between 10:00 and 19:00 local time. One enters the museum by climbing a ramp inside the Gülhane park walls.

== Gallery ==
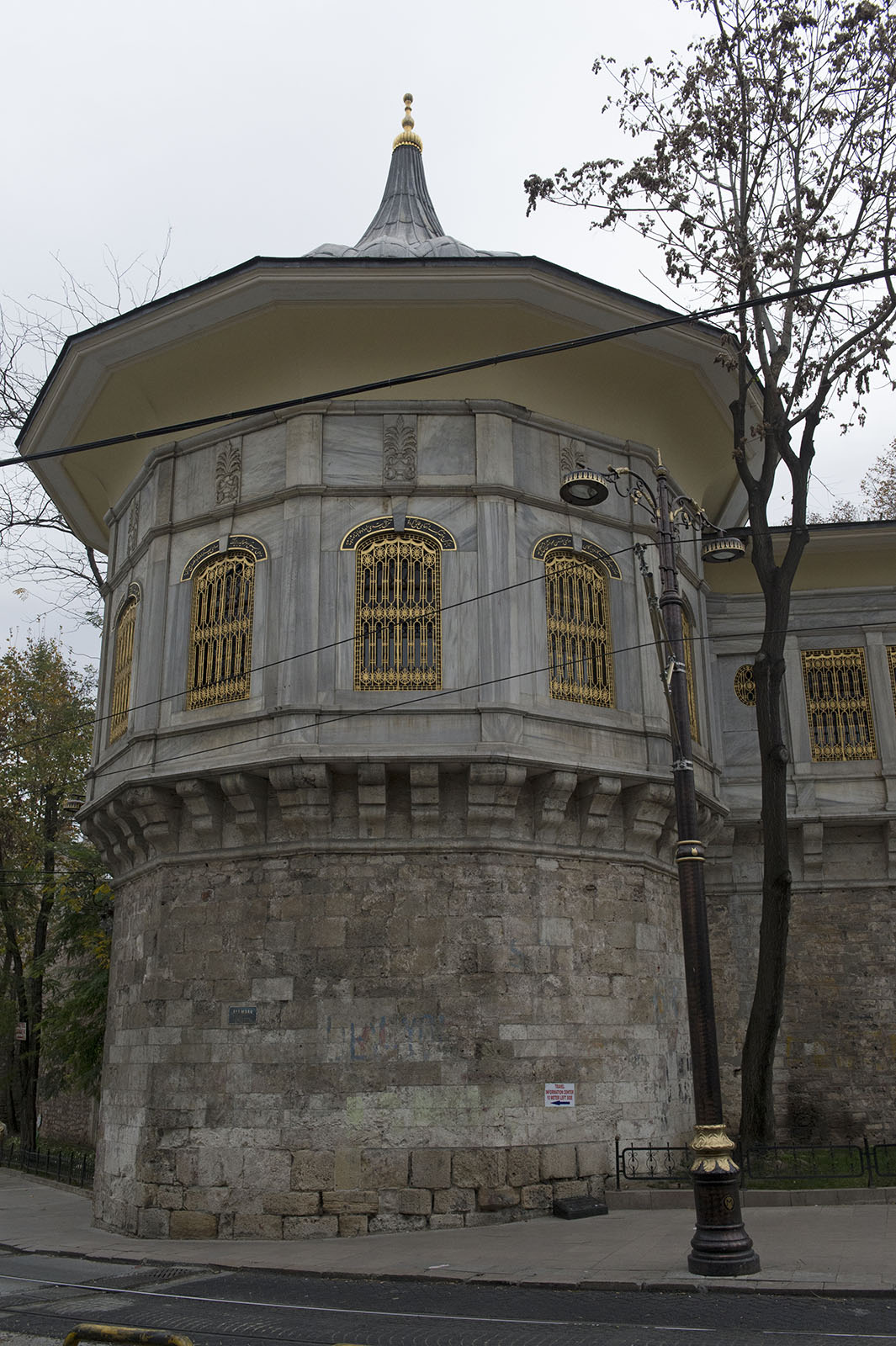
Procession kiosk exterior

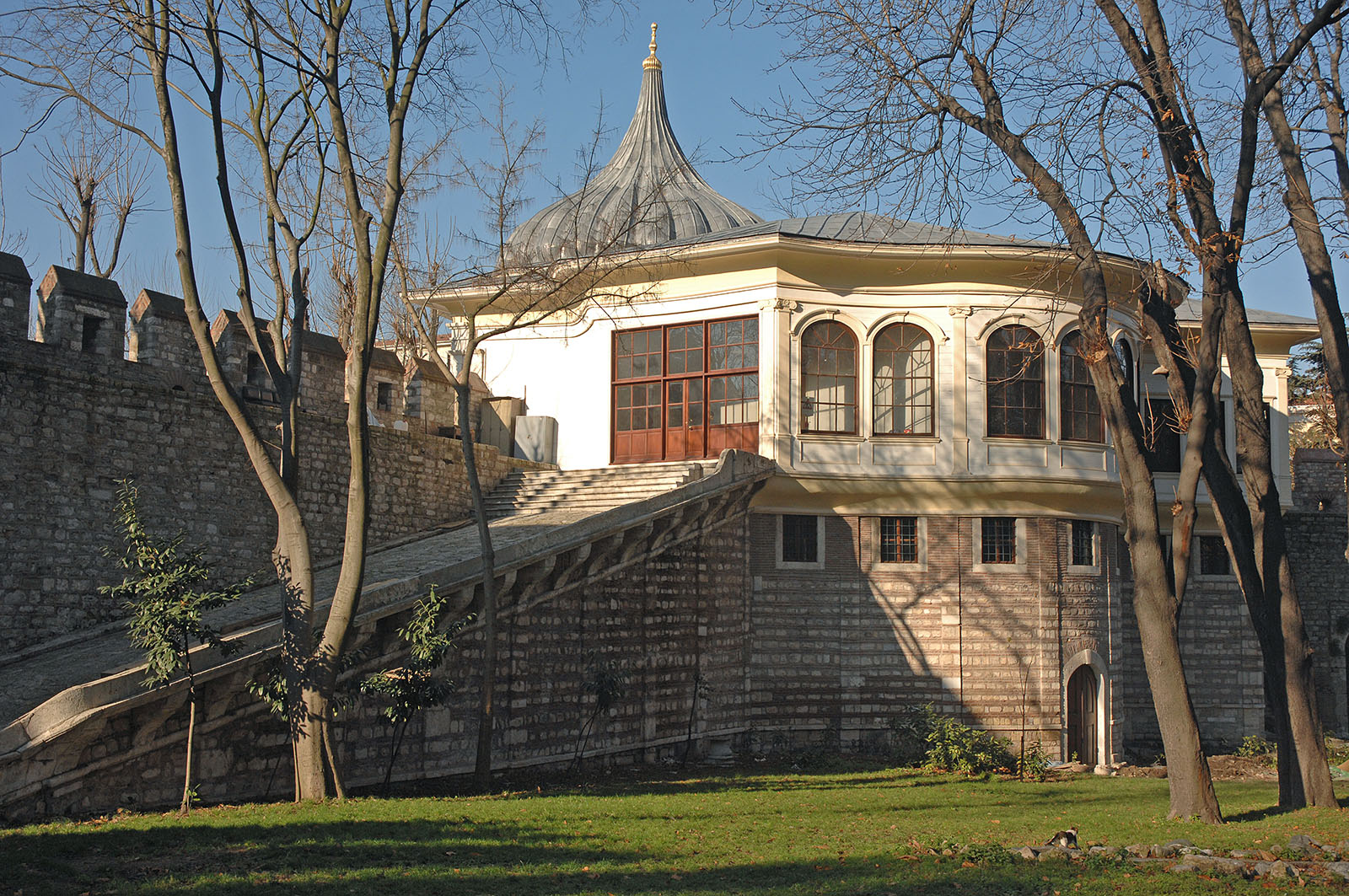
Procession kiosk Entrance ramp from park

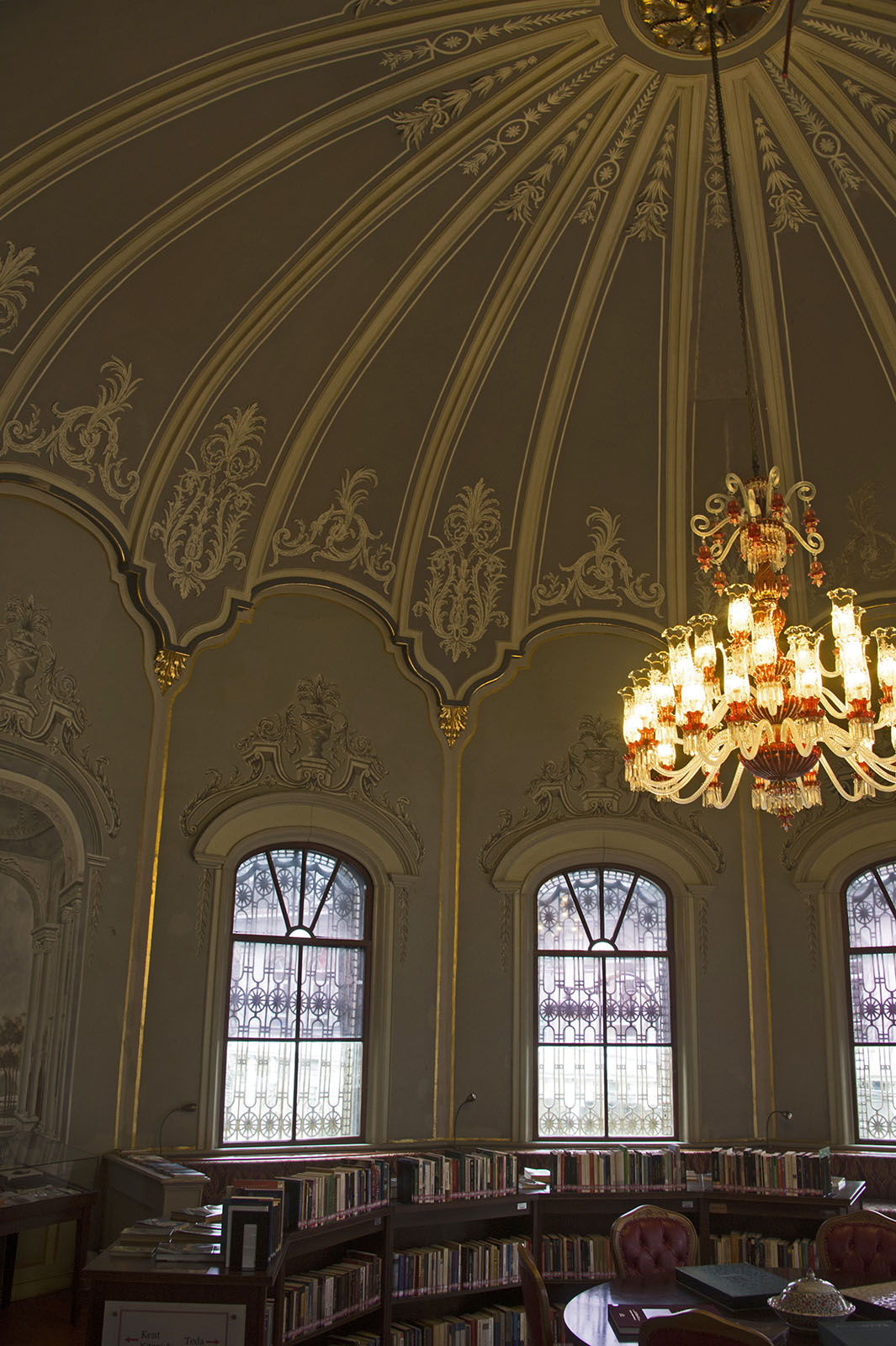
Procession kiosk Interior

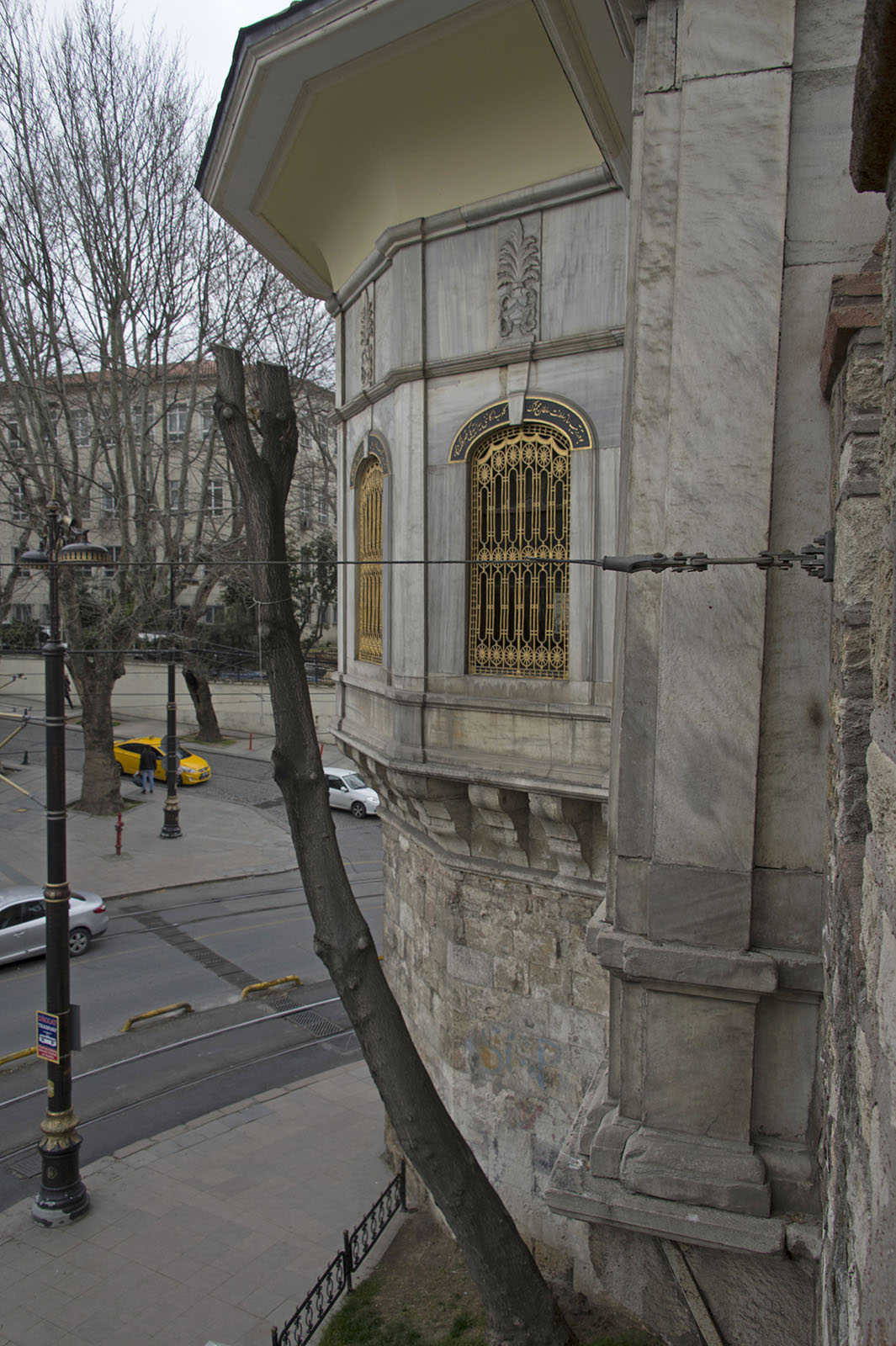
Procession kiosk exterior

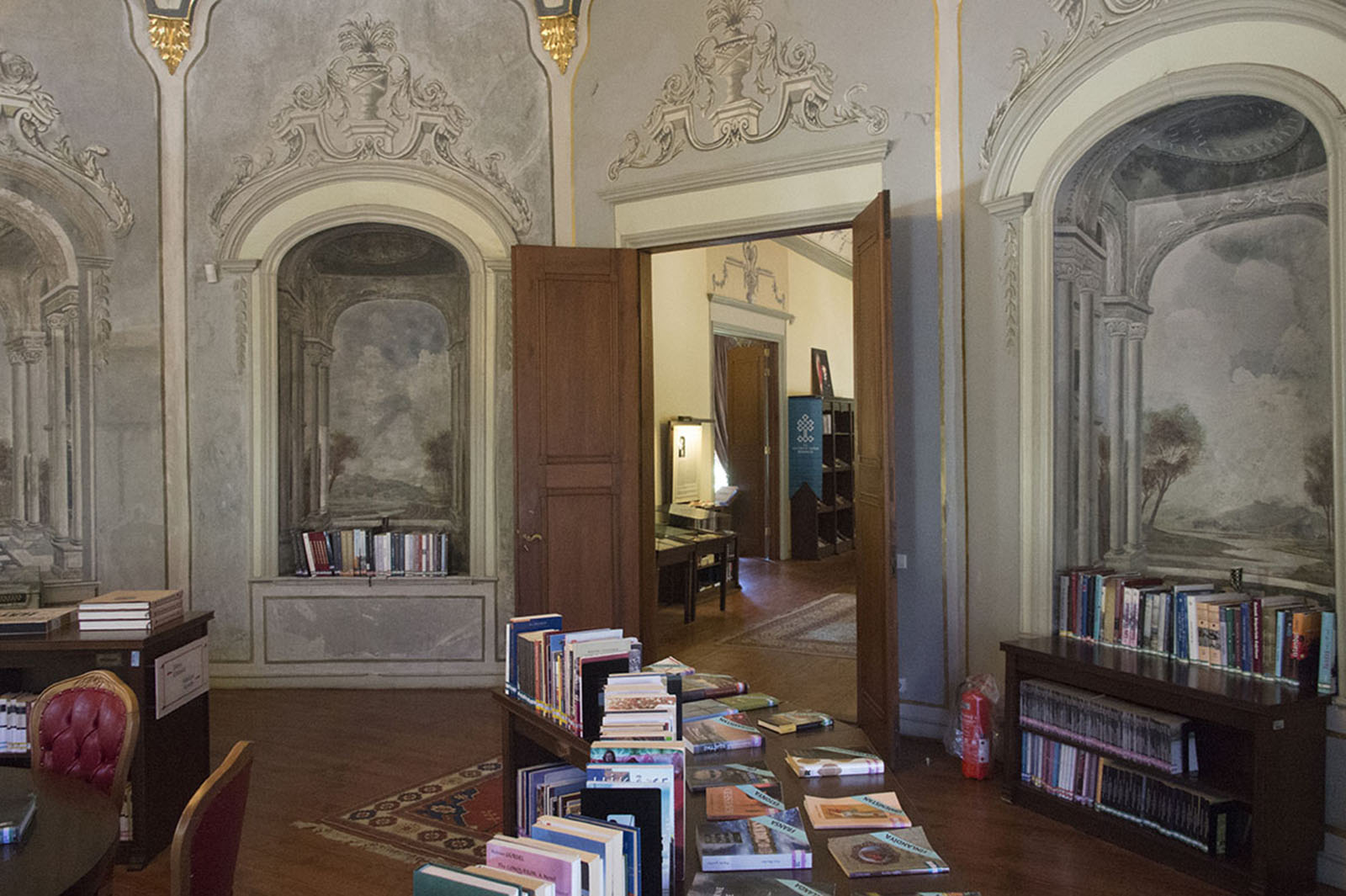
Procession kiosk interior

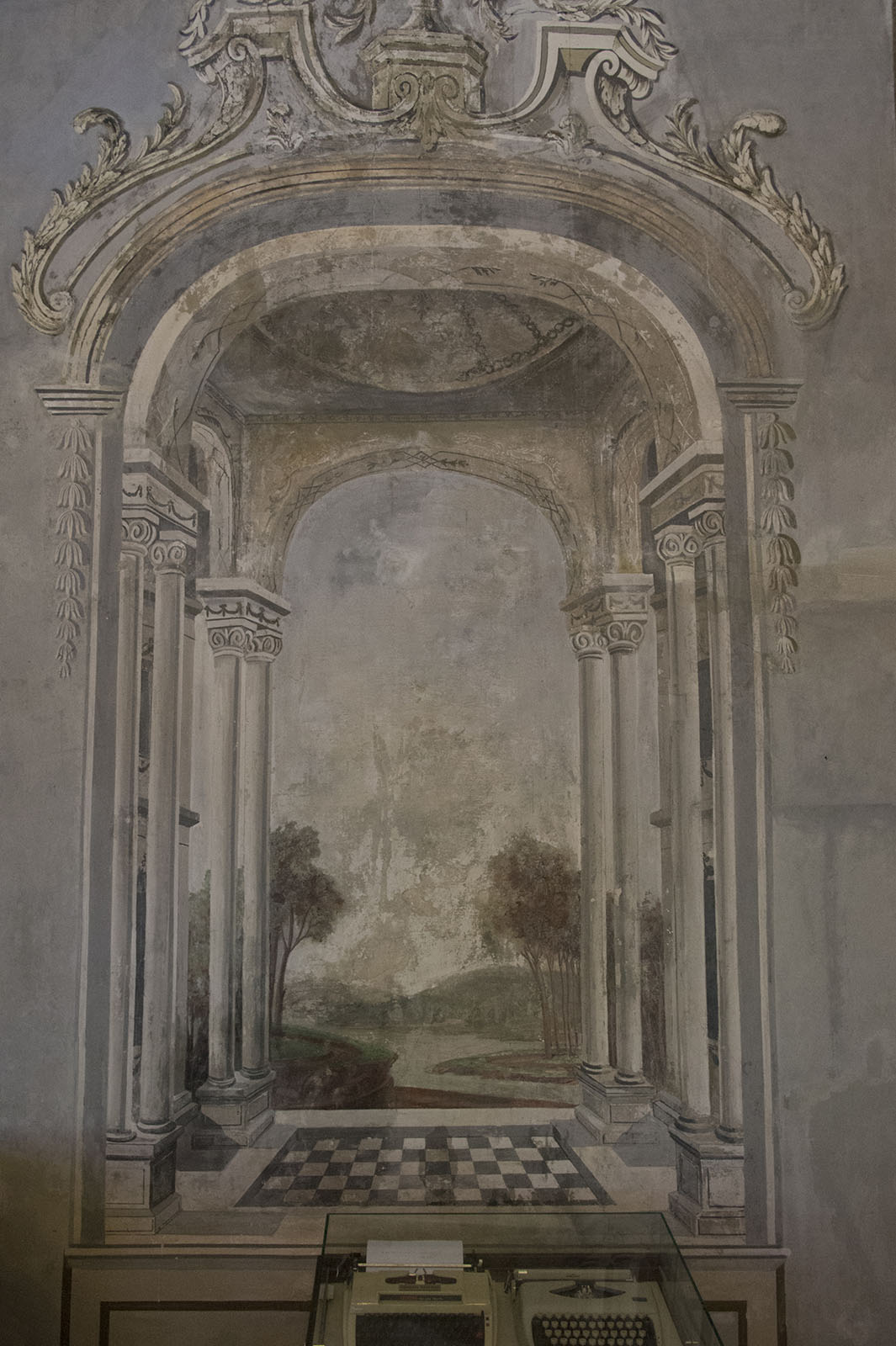
Procession kiosk Wall painting

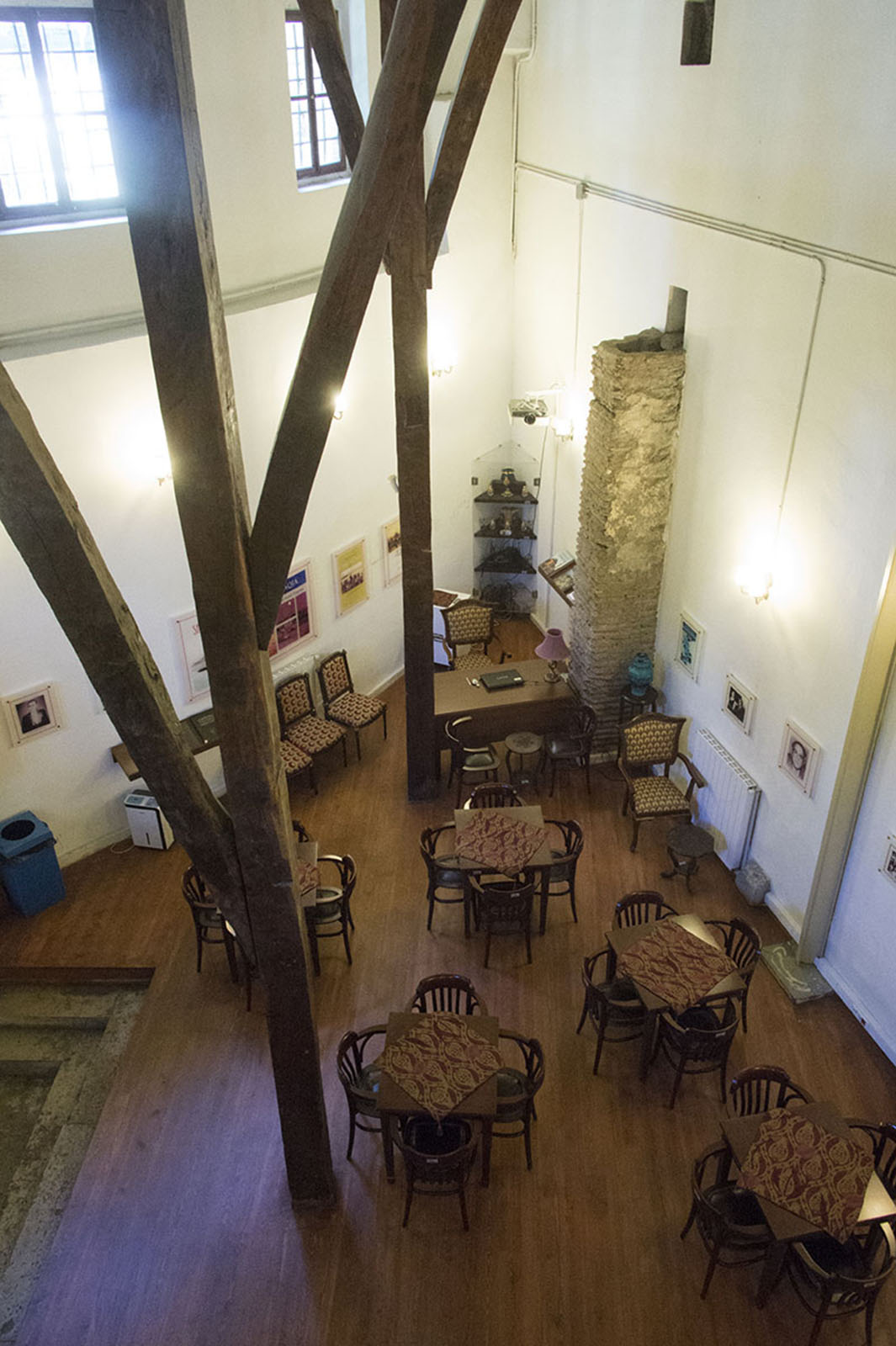
Procession kiosk Downstairs area

== Gallery ==
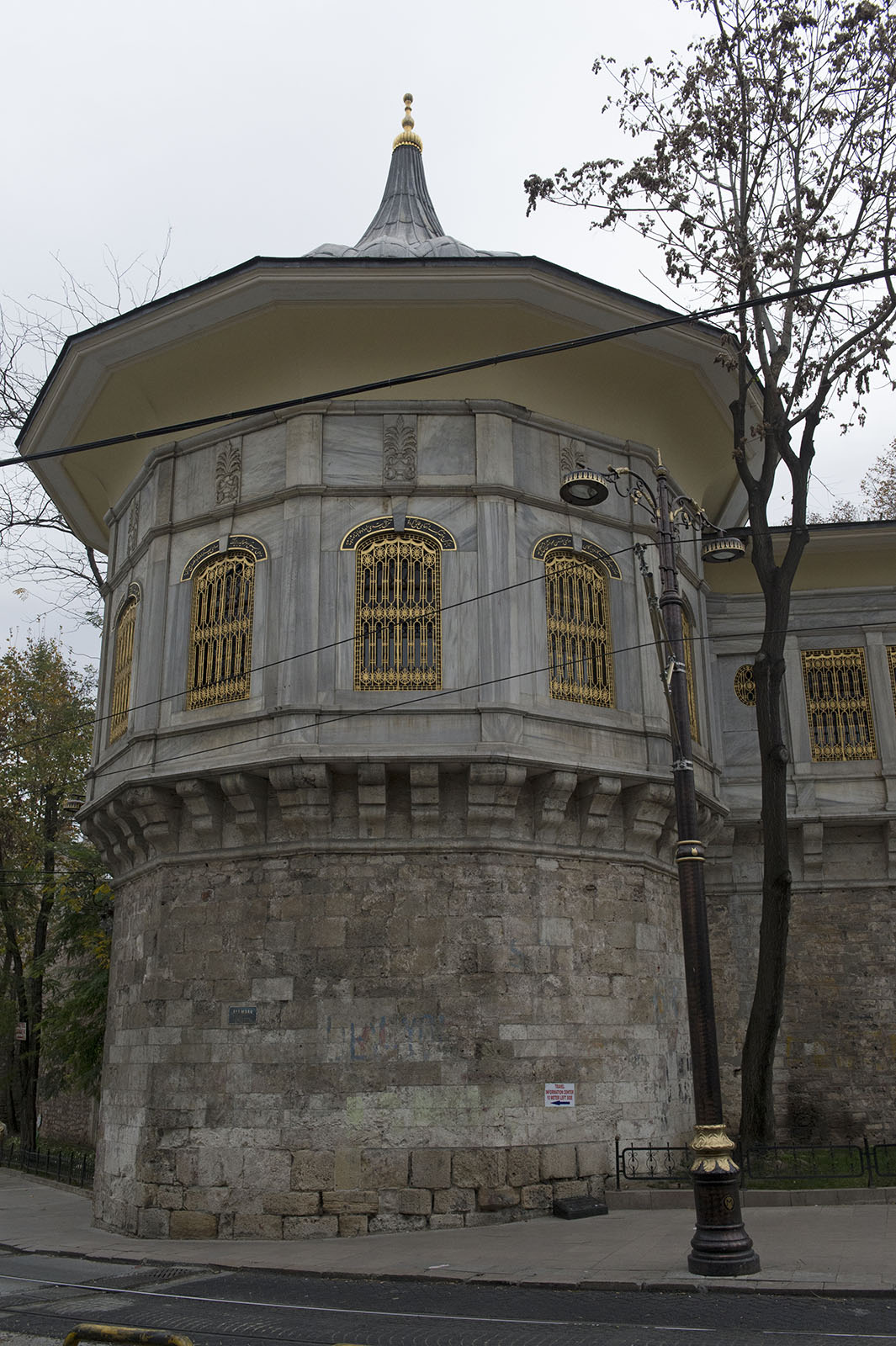
Procession kiosk exterior

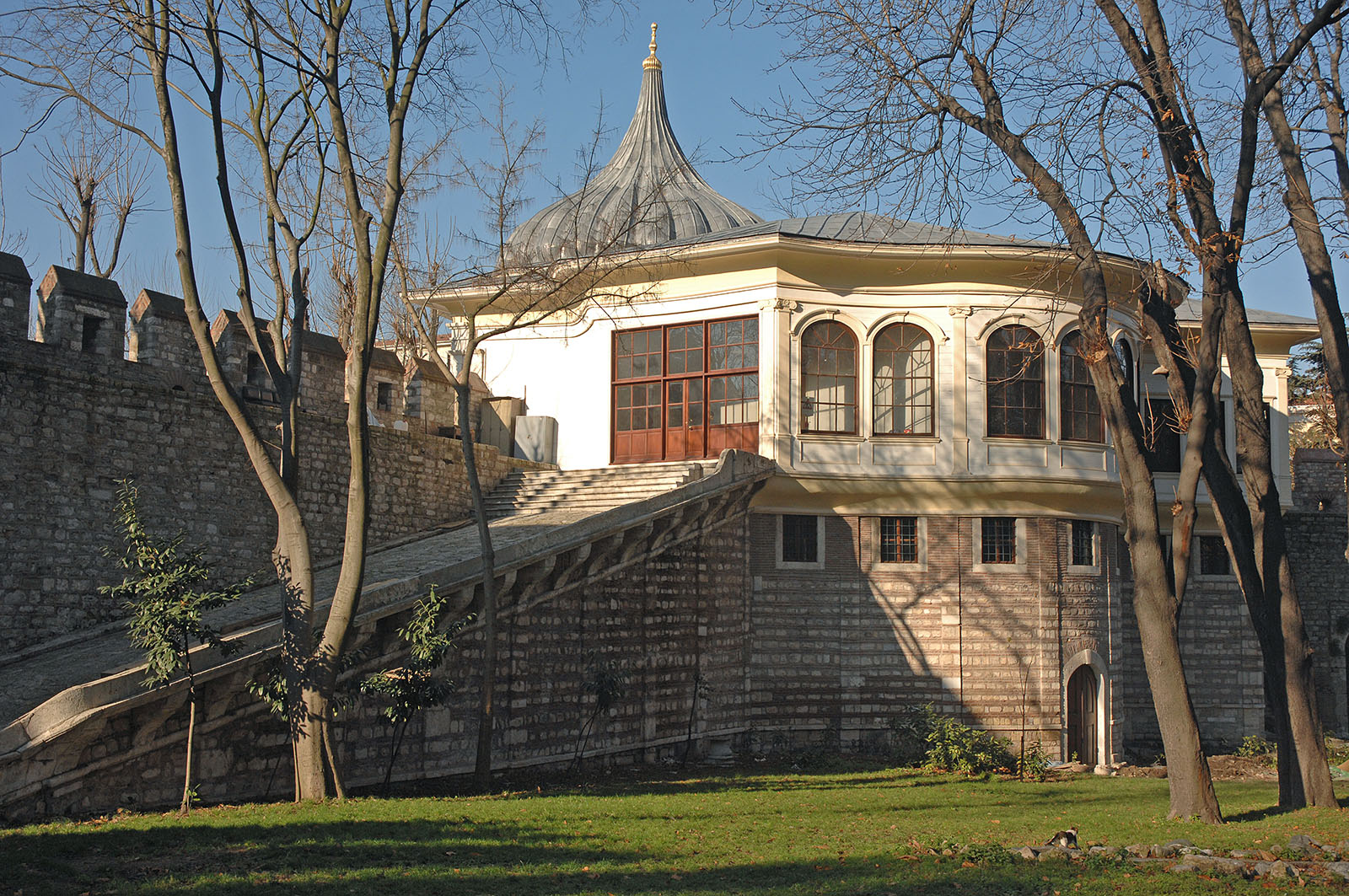
Procession kiosk from park

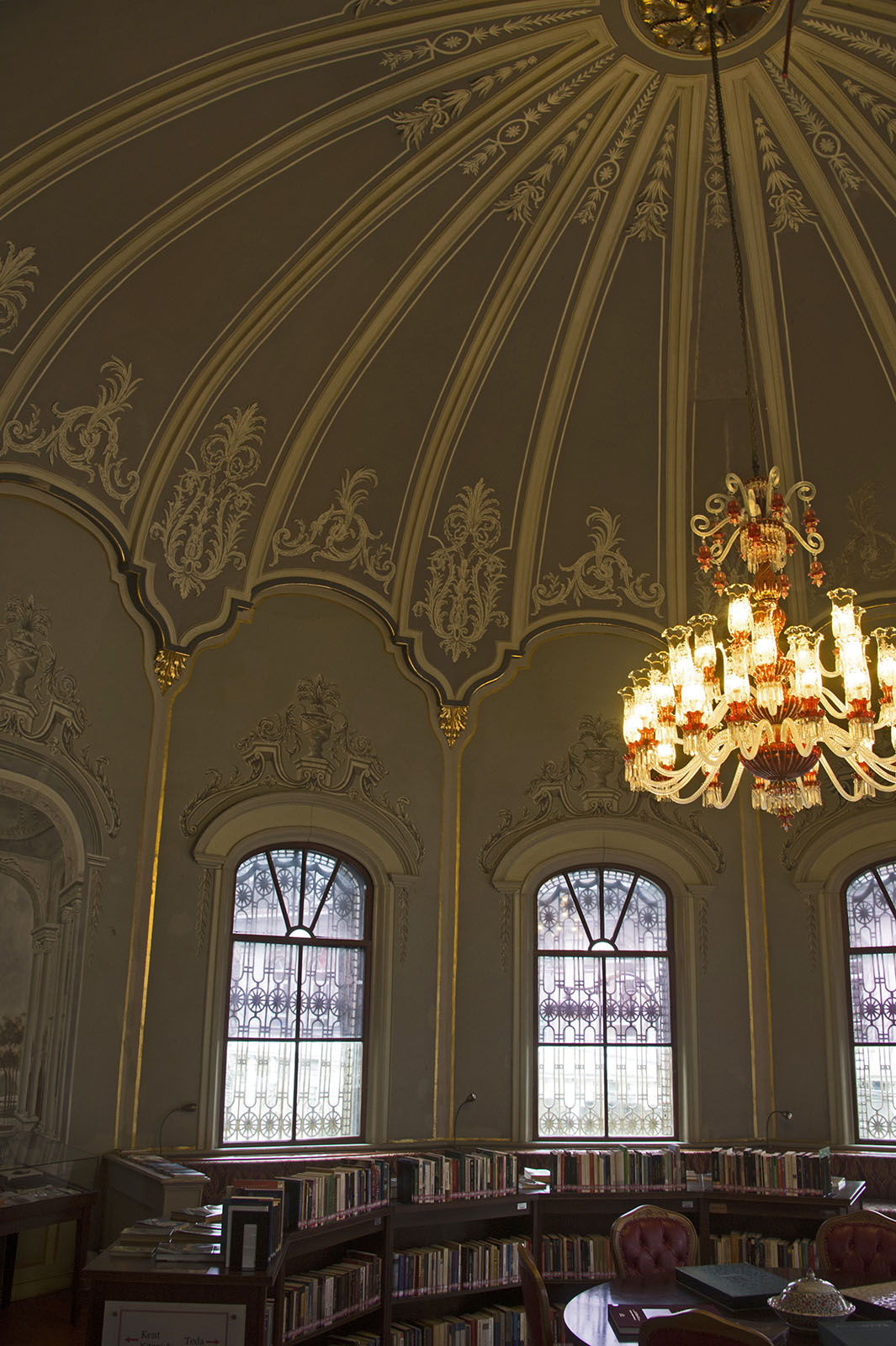
Procession kiosk Interior

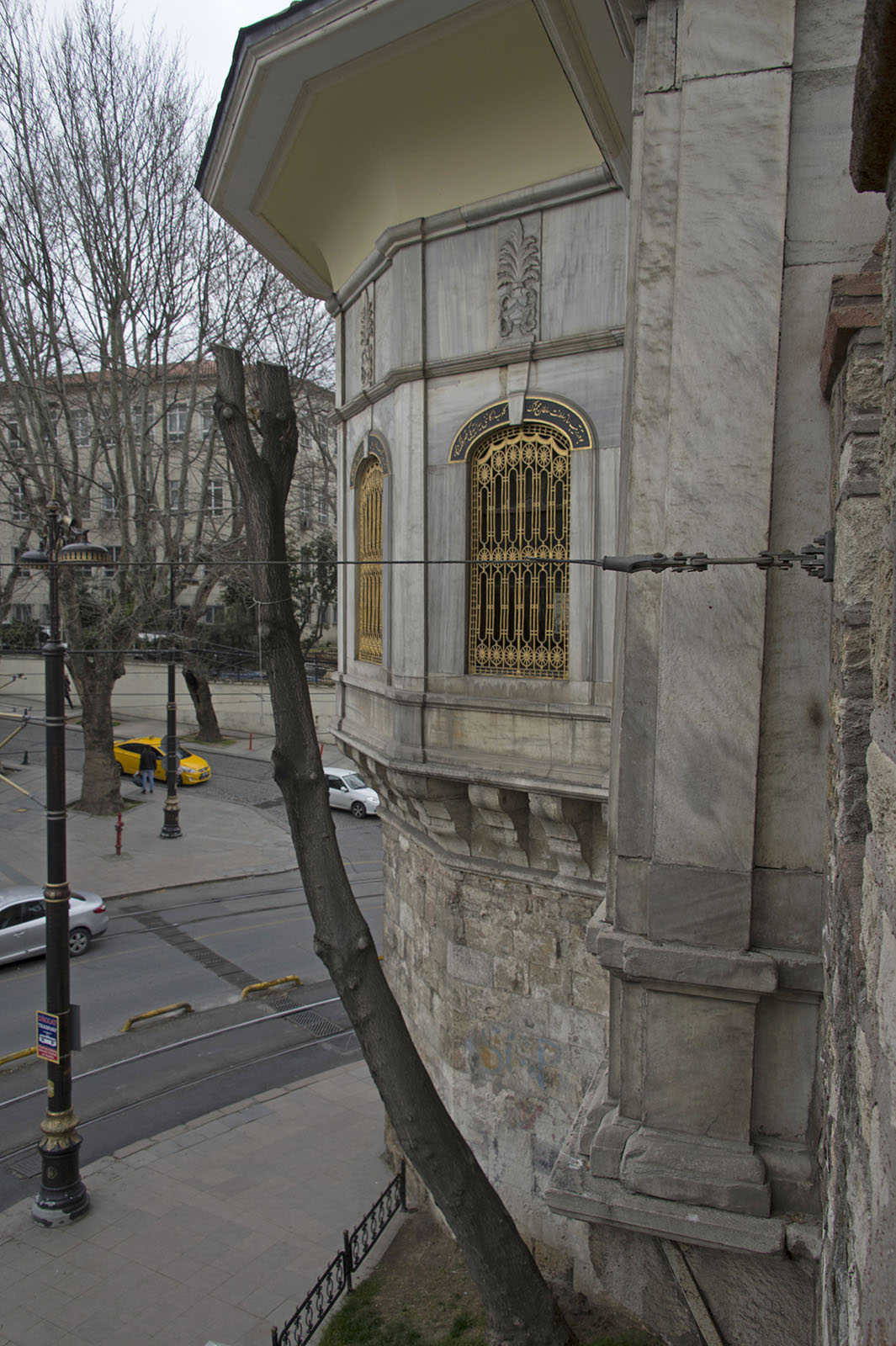
Procession kiosk exterior

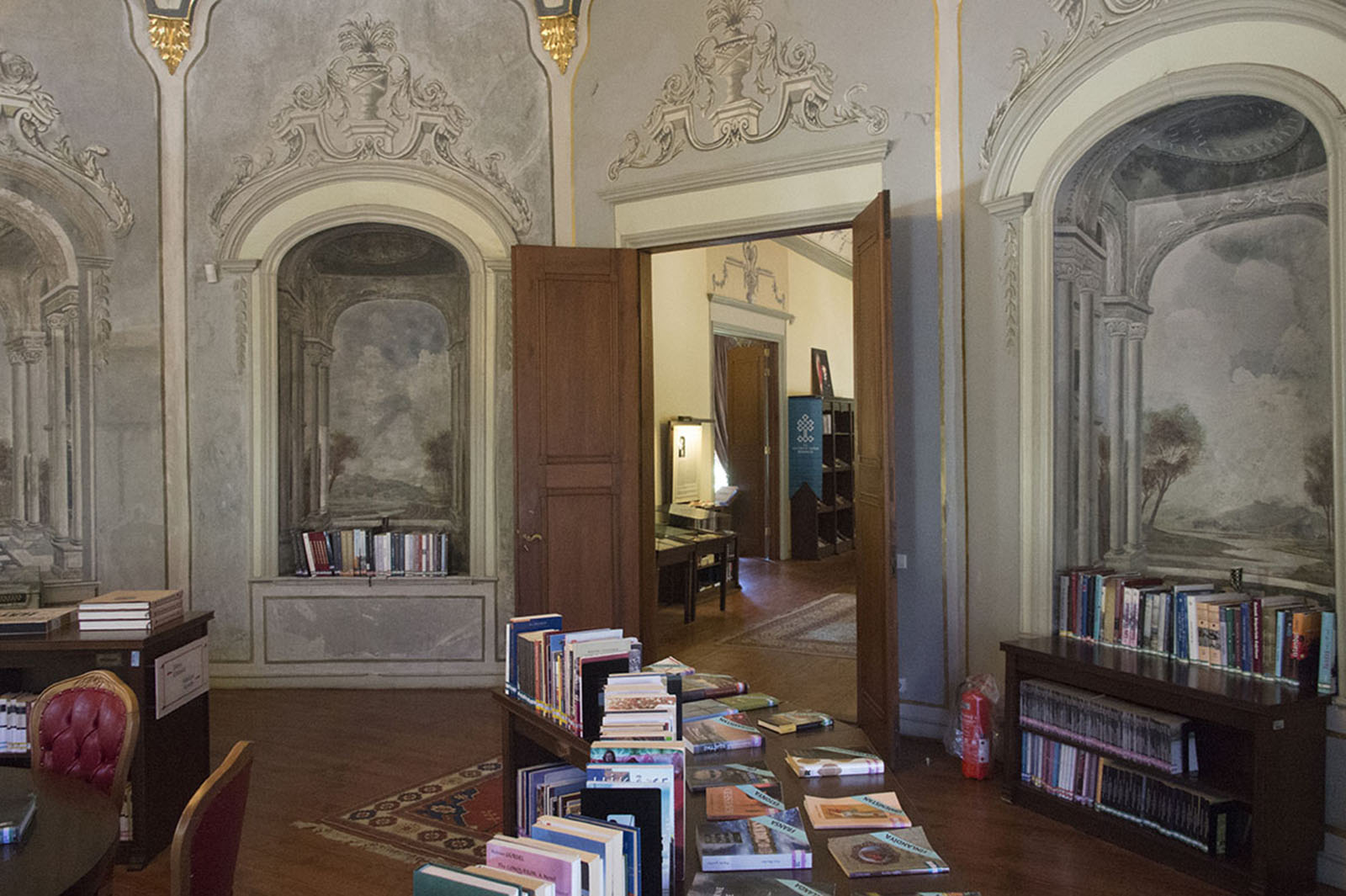
Procession kiosk interior

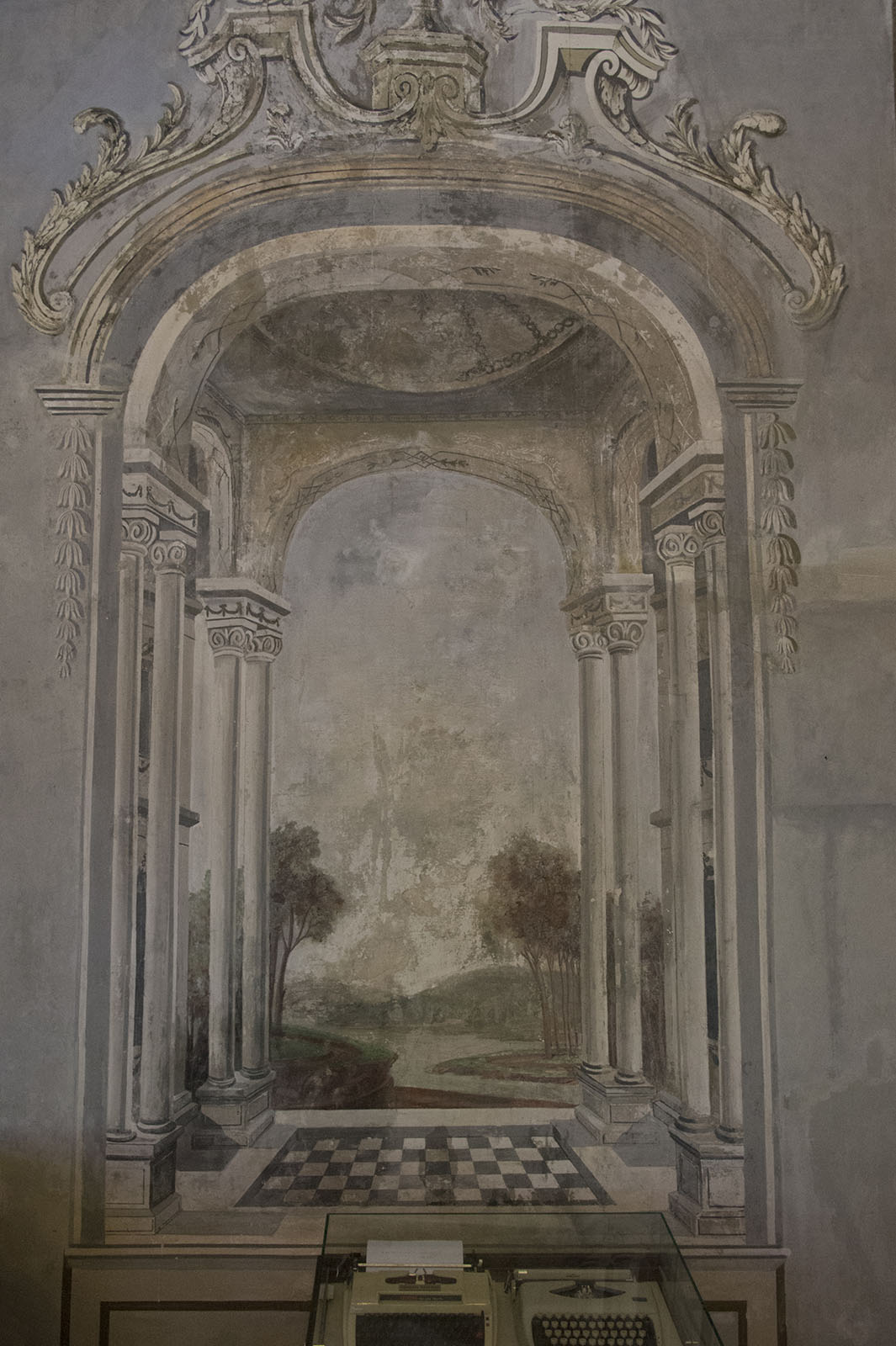
Procession kiosk Wall painting

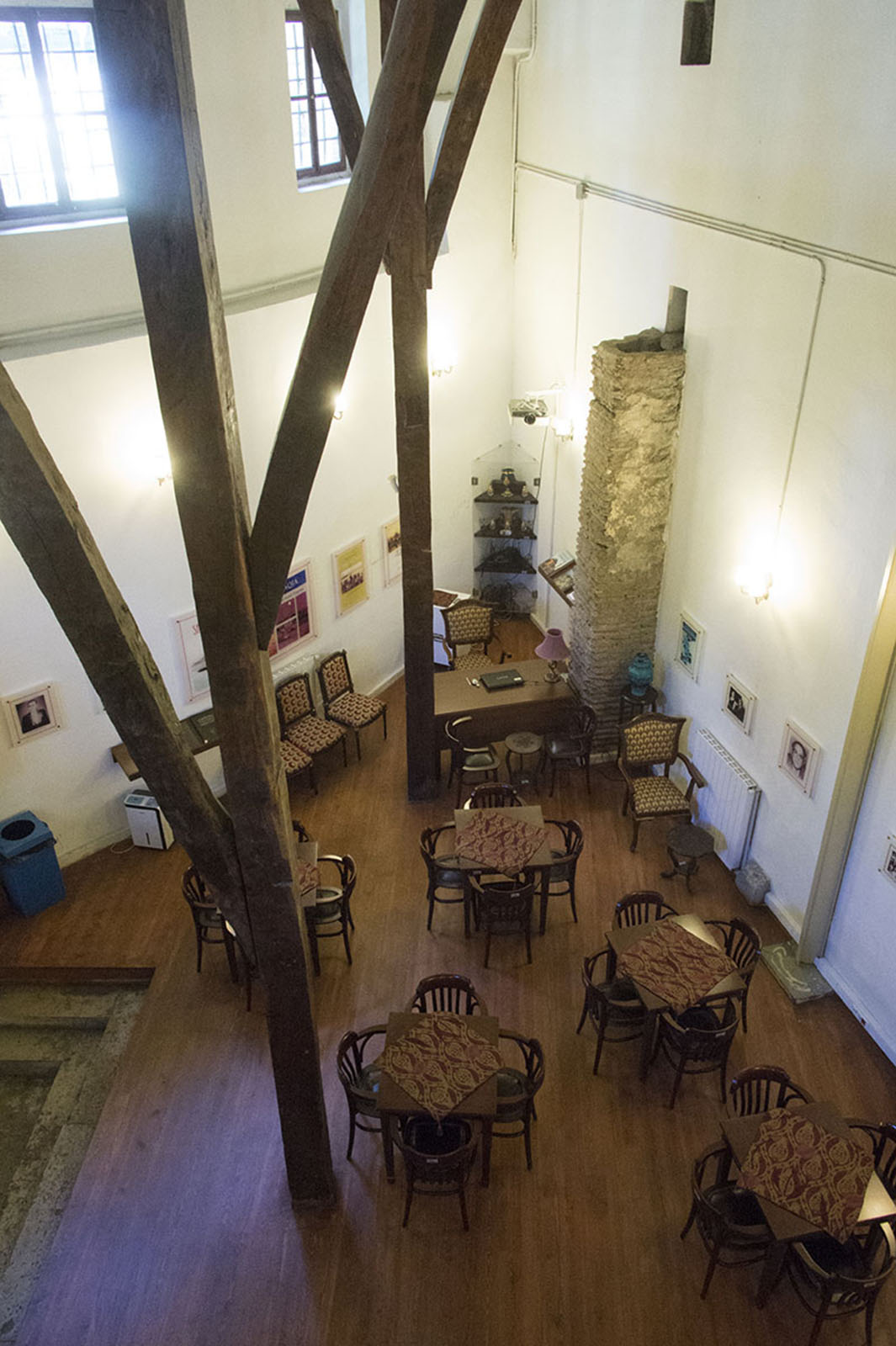
Procession kiosk Downstairs area

== See also ==
- Ahmet Arif Literature Museum Library, Diyarbakır
- Mehmet Akif Literature Museum Library, Ankara
