= Ziya Gökalp Museum =

- Ziya Gökalp Müzesi
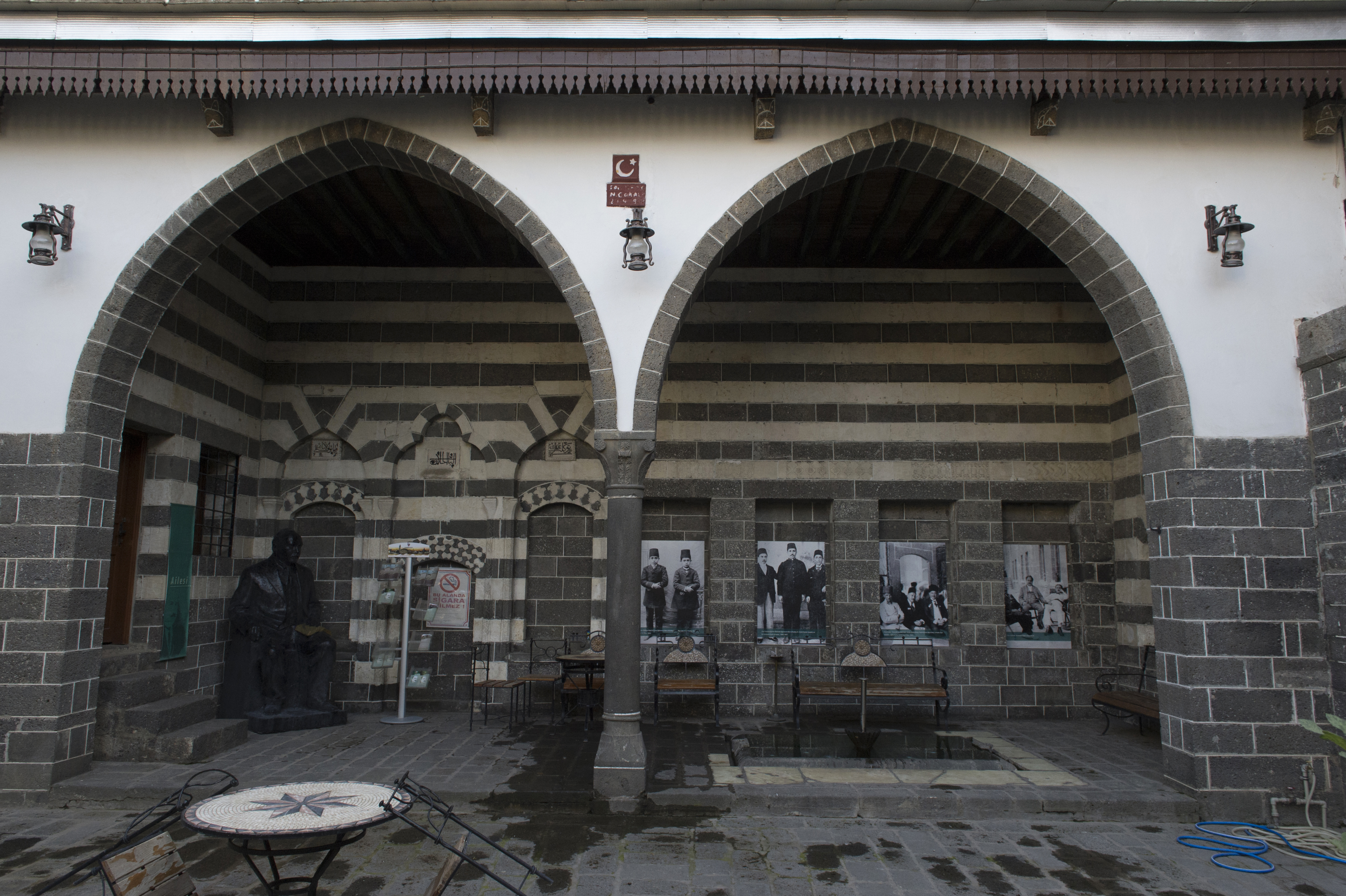

- Ziya Gökalp Museum
- Established: 1956; 70 years ago
- Coordinates: 37°54′41″N 40°14′03″E
- Type: House Museum
- Owner: Ministry of Culture and Tourism

Ziya Gökalp Museum (Turkish: Ziya Gökalp Müzesi) is a house museum dedicated to Ziya Gökalp in Diyarbakır, Turkey.

The museum is located in the historic Sur district of Diyarbakır. It is close to Grand Mosque and the Cahit Sıtkı Tarancı Museum.

Ziya Gökalp (1876–1924) was one of the most important intellectuals and spokesmen of the Turkish nationalist movement. The museum building is the house, where he was born and grew up in. The building was constructed in 1808. In 1953, the house was bought by the Ministry of Culture, and it was opened as a house museum on 23 March 1956.

The building has a ground floor and an upper floor. The basalt-stone house is composed of three sections around a courtyard. Unlike other Diyarbakır historical houses, the house pool is placed in the iwan rather than in the courtyard.

== Arson ==
On 7 September 2014, a group of mob assaulted the house and put the furniture in the house on fire. Valuable books and furniture were burned and the museum was temporarily closed to visits. According to Aydınlık newspaper, the masked mob was a PKK-oriented group.

== See also ==
- Ahmet Arif Literature Museum Library, a literary museum and archive dedicated to Turkish literature,
- Cahit Sıtkı Tarancı Museum, another historic house museum dedicated to Cahit Sıtkı Tarancı, a poet.
