= Dergâh =

Literary magazine in the Ottoman Empire (1921-1922)

- Editor-in-chief: Yahya Kemal
- Categories: Literary magazine
- Frequency: Biweekly
- Founder: Yahya Kemal; Ahmed Haşim
- Founded: 1921
- First issue: 15 April 1921
- Final issue: 5 January 1922
- Country: Ottoman Empire
- Based in: Istanbul
- Language: Ottoman Turkish

Dergâh (Turkish: Dervish lodge) was a conservative literary magazine which was published during the final days of the Ottoman Empire in Istanbul from 1921 to 1922. This period witnessed the occupation of Istanbul by the Western forces and also, the Turkish Independence War.

== History and profile ==
Dergâh was started in Istanbul in 1921 by Yahya Kemal and Ahmed Haşim. The former also served as the editor-in-chief of the magazine. Its first issue appeared on 15 April 1921, one month after the Allied forces declared the occupation of Istanbul. The magazine came out biweekly.

Major contributors of Dergâh included Hasan Ali Yücel and Abdülhak Şinasi who were adherents of the symbolist poetry. Ahmet Hamdi Tanpınar, a leading Turkish novelist, started his literary career in Dergâh. The writers and journalists who contributed to the magazine included: Halide Edib Adıvar, Nurullah Ataç, Falih Rıfkı Atay, Fuat Köprülü, Ziya Gökalp and Hilmi Ziya Ülken. Future politician Fevzi Lütfi Karaosmanoğlu started his journalistic career with the magazine. All these writers were supporters of the Independence War due to which some issues of the magazine were censored by the Allied administration. They also supported the ideas of the French philosopher Henri Bergson, and the magazine became the mouthpiece for his Turkish followers.

Dergâh acted as an intellectual platform which reinforced the traditionalist conservatism. It was among the early Turkish periodicals which covered articles on folklore.

Dergâh folded on 5 January 1922 after producing a total of forty-two issues.
