= Ahmet Haşim =

Turkish symbolist poet and writer, WWI veteran (1884-1933)

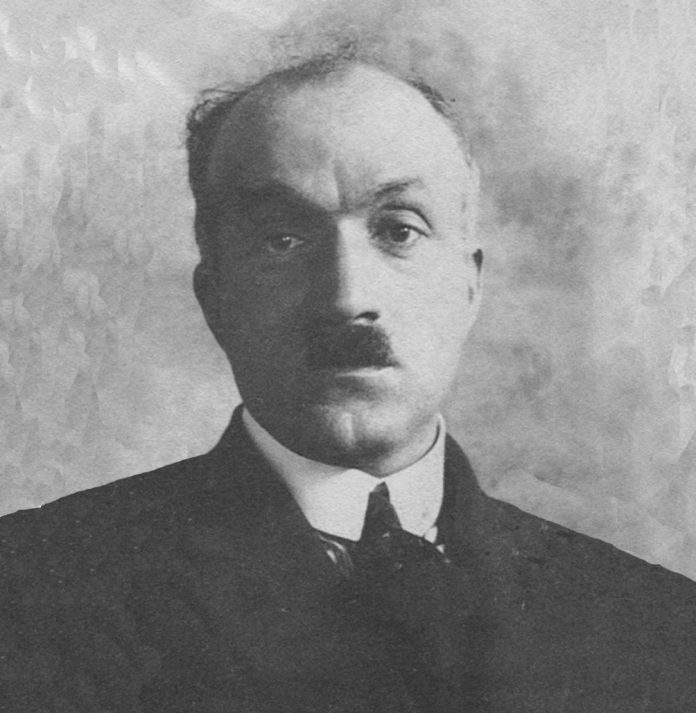
- Occupation: Poet

Ahmet Haşim (also written as Ahmed Hâşim; 1887 – 4 June 1933) was an influential Turkish poet of the early 20th century.

== Biography ==
Ahmed Haşim was born in Baghdad, probably in the year 1884. His father was the provincial governor of the Ottoman sanjak of Fizan. Around 1893, Ahmed went to Istanbul with his father, following the death of his mother. In 1906, having graduated from the Mekteb-i Sultanî (now Galatasaray High School), he began work in the Reji, the state tobacco monopoly, and was registered at Istanbul University's school of law. Between 1908 and 1910, Hâşim worked as a French language teacher in the city of İzmir and as an officer in the Office of Public Debts (Düyun-u Umumiye). He was conscripted in the First World War, serving mostly in Anatolia; following the war, he returned to Istanbul and worked in the Ottoman Bank. After the foundation of the Republic of Turkey, Haşim worked as a teacher of aesthetics in the Academy of Fine Arts and as a French language teacher at Istanbul University. For many years, he also wrote essays for the newspapers Akşam and İkdam.

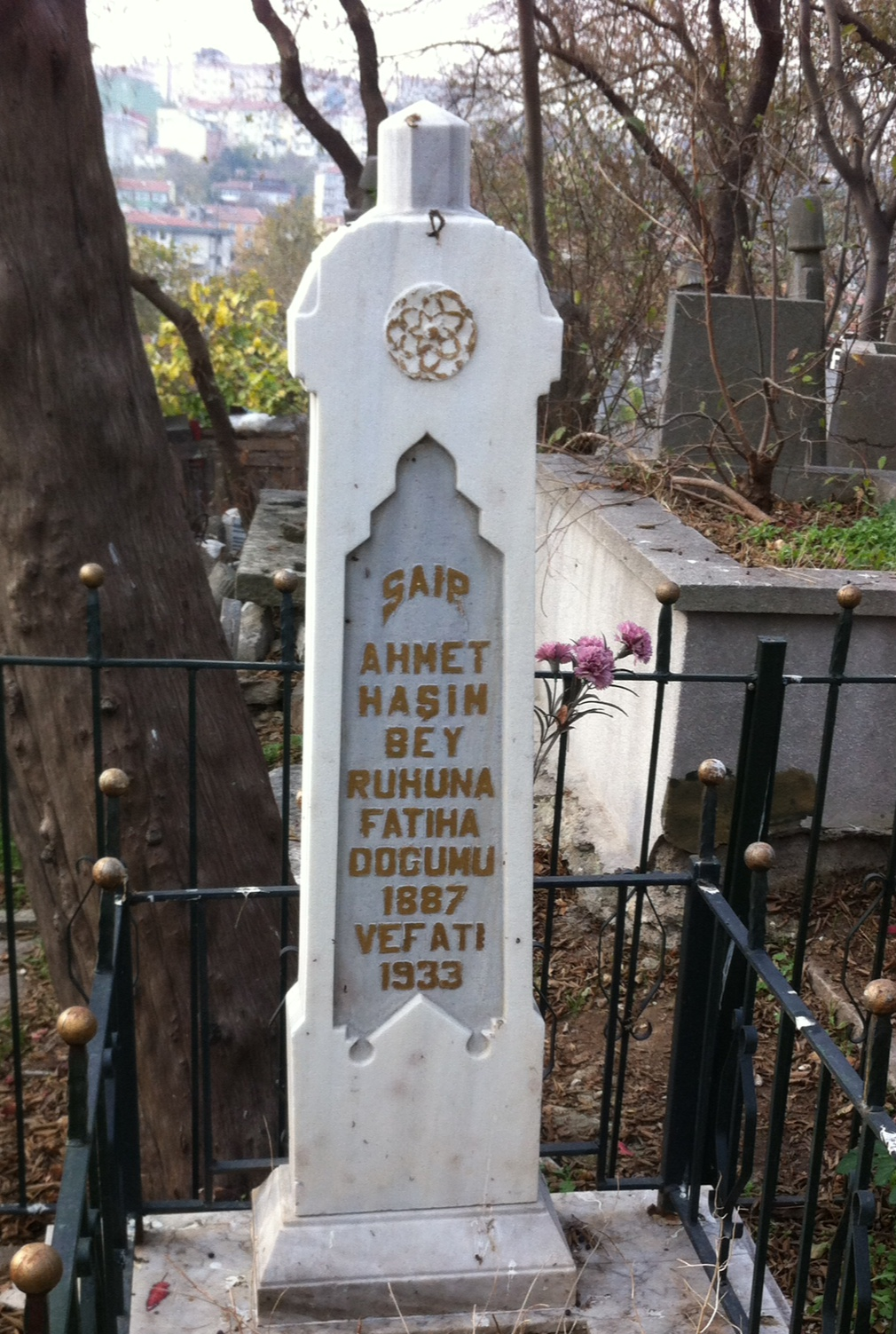
Ahmet Haşim's grave in Eyüp Cemetery.

Ahmed Haşim died on 4 June 1933, and was laid to rest at the Eyüp Cemetery.

== Works ==
Ahmed Hâşim's first poems were published in Mecmua-i Edebiye (مجموعه ادبيه; "Literary Periodical") between 1900 and 1912. At this time, he was a member of the movement known as Fecr-i Âtî (ﻓﺠﺮ ﺁﺕﯽ), or "Dawn of the Future". Later, he would publish together with other poets in the periodical Dergâh (درگاه). Around 1921, he published his first book of poetry, Göl Saatleri (گول ساعتلرى; "Hours of the Lake"). His second book of poetry, Piyâle (پياله; "The Wine Cup"), would follow in 1926.

Hâşim's early poetry was very much in the Parnassian and Decadent vein of the poets Tevfik Fikret (1867–1915) and Cenab Şahâbeddin (1870–1934), early influences who were a part of the Edebiyyât-ı Cedîde (ادبيات جدیده; "New Literature") movement. Hâşim's later poetry, however—collected in Göl Saatleri and Piyâle—evidences more of a French Symbolist influence, particularly that of Henri de Régnier, whom Hâşim greatly admired. This late poetry can—to a certain extent—be seen to adhere to the Fecr-i Âtî movement's variation of the Symbolist motto: "Sanat şahsî ve muhteremdir" (صنعت ﺵﺨﺼﯽ و محترمدر; "Art is personal and revered"). In line with this motto, and with the Symbolist movement in general, much of his poetry was more indirect than direct, using thick imagery so as to create a strong sensory impression, as in the opening lines of his famous poem from the book Piyâle, "Merdiven" ("Stairway" or "The Ladder"):

آغير، آغير چيقه جقسْك بو مرديونلردن
أتکلرکده کونش رنکى بر ييغين ياپراق
..و بر زمان باقاجقسك سمايه آغلايه رق

،صولر صاراردى ... يوزك پرده پرد صولقده
..قزيل هوالرى سيرايت که آقشام اولقده

Ağır, ağır çıkacaksın bu merdivenlerden,
Eteklerinde güneş rengi bir yığın yaprak,
Ve bir zaman bakacaksın semâya ağlayarak..

Sular sarardı.. yüzün perde perde solmakta,
Kızıl havaları seyret ki akşam olmakta...

Transliteration:

Slowly you will ascend these stairs,
A bundle of sun-colored leaves on your skirts
Then a moment you will look, weeping, at the skies...

The waters yellow.. as your face pales bit by bit,
Watch the reddened air for the evening sets in

Transfiguration:

Heavily, ascend heavily the rungs,
Skirted in a pile of sunwashed leaves,
In time you'll look to sky in tears.

Murky waters ... pleats, fading pleats of your face,
See the crimson air as evening to be ..

(The form of ellipsis is borrowed from the original author.) This poem also shows one of the tropes that Hâşim shares with the Symbolists; namely, he uses carefully selected natural images to express the emotional state of the poem's persona. Many of Hâşim's later poems, especially those collected in Piyâle, use this technique in a very brief and evocative fashion, showing the influence not only of Symbolism, but also of the haiku poetry that Hâşim was reading at the time.

Ahmet Haşim founded a literary magazine, Dergâh, in 1921 together with another significant figure Yahya Kemal.

== Bibliography ==
Poetry

- Göl Saatleri (گول ساعتلرى, "Hours of the Lake"), 1921
- Piyâle (پياله, "Goblet"), 1926

Prose

- Bize Göre ("According to Us"), 1928
- Gurebâhâne-i Laklakan ("Nursery for the Storks"), 1928
- Frankfurt Seyahatnamesi ("Journey to Frankfurt"), 1933

== See also ==
- List of contemporary Turkish poets
