= Mehmet Akif Ersoy Literature Museum Library =

Museum and archive dedicated to Turkish Literature

- Mehmet Akif Ersoy Edebiyat Müze Kütüphanesi
- Established: March 12, 2011; 15 years ago
- Location: Hamamönü, Altındağ, Ankara, Turkey
- Coordinates: 39.93199°N 32.86689°E
- Type: Literary, biographical
- Owner: Ministry of Culture and Tourism
- Website: www.mehmetakifersoyedebiyatmuzekutuphanesi.gov.tr

The Mehmet Akif Ersoy Literature Museum Library (Turkish: Mehmet Akif Ersoy Edebiyat Müze Kütüphanesi) is a literary museum and archive dedicated to Turkish literature and named after the poet Mehmet Âkif Ersoy (1873–1936), the Turkish poet of the Turkish National Anthem. Located in Ankara, Turkey, the museum was established by the Ministry of Culture and Tourism and opened on March 12, 2011, the 90th anniversary of the adoption the national anthem.

The museum is housed in a two-storey building, which reflects the typical architecture of old Ankara houses. The building, restored for this purpose, is located in Hamamönü neighborhood Altındağ district. The library accommodates around 7,000 books and 100 periodicals, including the works of Ersoy and books written about him. The archive is dedicated to well-known authors native to Ankara and surrounding places. Books about Mustafa Kemal Atatürk (1881–1938), the Gallipoli Campaign (1915–1916) and the War of Independence (1919–1923) are also part of the collection.

At the museum's ground floor, awarded literary works and author-signed books are exhibited in addition to periodicals on literature. Here is a special section allocated to the life and works of Mehmet Akif Ersoy, where his personal belonging are also on display. At the upper floor, books about Ankara and works of authors from Ankara are offered. Discussions on various authors, book signing events, poetry performances and writing workshops take also place at the museum library. It is the first of its kind in Turkey. Minister Ertuğrul Günay told during the opening ceremony that it is part of a project of museum-library network called "Seven museum libraries in seven regions of Turkey", namely Ahmet Hamdi Tanpınar Literature Museum Library in Istanbul, Ahmet Arif Literature Museum Library in Diyarbakır, Karacaoğlan Literature Museum Library in Adana, Erzurumlu Emrah Literature Museum Library in Erzurum, Attila İlhan Literature Museum Library in İzmir and Bedri Rahmi Eyüboğlu Literature Museum Library in Trabzon that will follow soon.

The museum is open during weekdays between 10:00 and 19:00 local time.

== See also ==
- Ahmet Arif Literature Museum Library, Diyarbakır
- Ahmet Hamdi Tanpınar Literature Museum Library, Istanbul
