= The Silent Ship =

Poem by Yahya Kemal Beyatlı

The Silent Ship (Turkish: Sessiz Gemi) is one of the best-known and best-loved poems by Yahya Kemal Beyatlı. It is a poem primarily about death, but also about the feelings of those who love but cannot be together, those who miss someone whom they have given up, and those who regret the absence of their loved ones.

== Turkish text ==
Artık demir almak günü gelmişse zamandan
Meçhule giden bir gemi kalkar bu limandan.

Hiç yolcusu yokmuş gibi sessizce alır yol;
Sallanmaz o kalkışta ne mendil, ne de bir kol.

Rıhtımda kalanlar bu seyahatten elemli,
Günlerce siyah ufka bakar gözleri nemli,

Biçare gönüller! Ne giden son gemidir bu!
Hicranlı hayatın ne de son matemidir bu.

Dünyada sevilmiş ve seven nafile bekler;
Bilmez ki giden sevgililer dönmeyecekler.

Birçok gidenin her biri memnun ki yerinden,
Birçok seneler geçti; dönen yok seferinden.

== English translation ==
If the day has arrived at last to weigh anchor from time
A ship departs from this harbour to an unknown clime

As if it has no passengers, silently it makes way
No hand nor handkerchief is waved as it sails away

The journey is distress for those left behind on the quay
Their tearful eyes scan the black horizon day after day

Desperate hearts: this will neither be the last ship to go
Nor the final bereavement of a life filled with sorrow

In this world, the beloved and the lover wait in vain
Not knowing that the loved ones will never come back again

Those who sailed away are surely happy with their sojourn
Years went by since that voyage, yet not one soul will return

== Structure ==
The poem consists of six rhyming couplets in the masnavi form. It follows the traditional, syllable-based aruz metre of Ottoman poetry, with the syllables following the pattern “mefûlü/ mefâilü/ mefâilü/ feûlü”.

== Metaphor ==
The poem uses the journey into the unknown as a metaphor for death, with the ship itself representing the human soul and the loved ones in the quay, the friends and family of the departed.

The poem was written in the context of the deep and enduring love that Yahya Kemal felt for tr:Celile Hikmet, artist and mother of poet Nazim Hikmet. Despite his love, Yahya Kemal never worked up the courage to propose to her, and eventually, to mutual regret, they separated. He wrote of her departure on a ferry from Heybeliada, where she had spent the summer, to return to Istanbul in the autumn. “ Now, while the ferry was leaving the pier, people were waving handkerchiefs and crying… Until she left the island felt full… as soon as she left it was empty for me.

It has been argued by some that the ship in the poem represents a coffin. However Yahya Kemal himself made clear that this was not the case, and the silent ship raising anchor from time and departing the quay was a metaphor for the soul leaving friends and family behind as it departed from its previous existence.

== Publication history ==
Yahya Kemal Beyatlı published various individual poems in literary magazines during his lifetime, but never published a collection in book form. He did however broadcast a reading of the poem on the radio, shortly after which an article about the poem, written by his friend tr:Nihad Sâmi Banarlı was published in the Hürriyet newspaper on 15 October 1955.

After his death the tr: İstanbul Fetih Cemiyeti published a three-part edition of his poems, tr:Kendi Gök Kubbemiz and The Silent Ship appeared in the second part, which was entitled Yol Düşüncesi (Reflections from the Road).

On the fiftieth anniversary of his death in 2008, an edition of his private letters and other writings was published with the title Gemi Elli Yıldır Sessiz (The Ship Has Been Silent For Fifty Years).

== Critical appreciation ==
Hüseyin Yaşar has suggested that the poem showed a significant influence from French poetry, particularly Charles Baudelaire and Arthur Rimbaud. Peyami Safa drew attention to the similarity between the theme of Sessiz Gemi and Mallarmé’s poem fr: Brise marine.

Kamil İşeri and Sercan Demirgüneş have argued, based on a semiotic and semantic analysis, that the poem has a theme of eternity and infinity that transcends death.

== Musical setting and recordings ==
The poem was set to music by Yahya Kemal’s friend Münir Nurettin Selçuk. Versions of this have been recorded by Müslüm Gürses, Hümeyra and Sertab Erener.
