= Procession Kiosk =

16th-century building in Istanbul, Turkey

Coordinates: 41.01098°N 28.97827°E

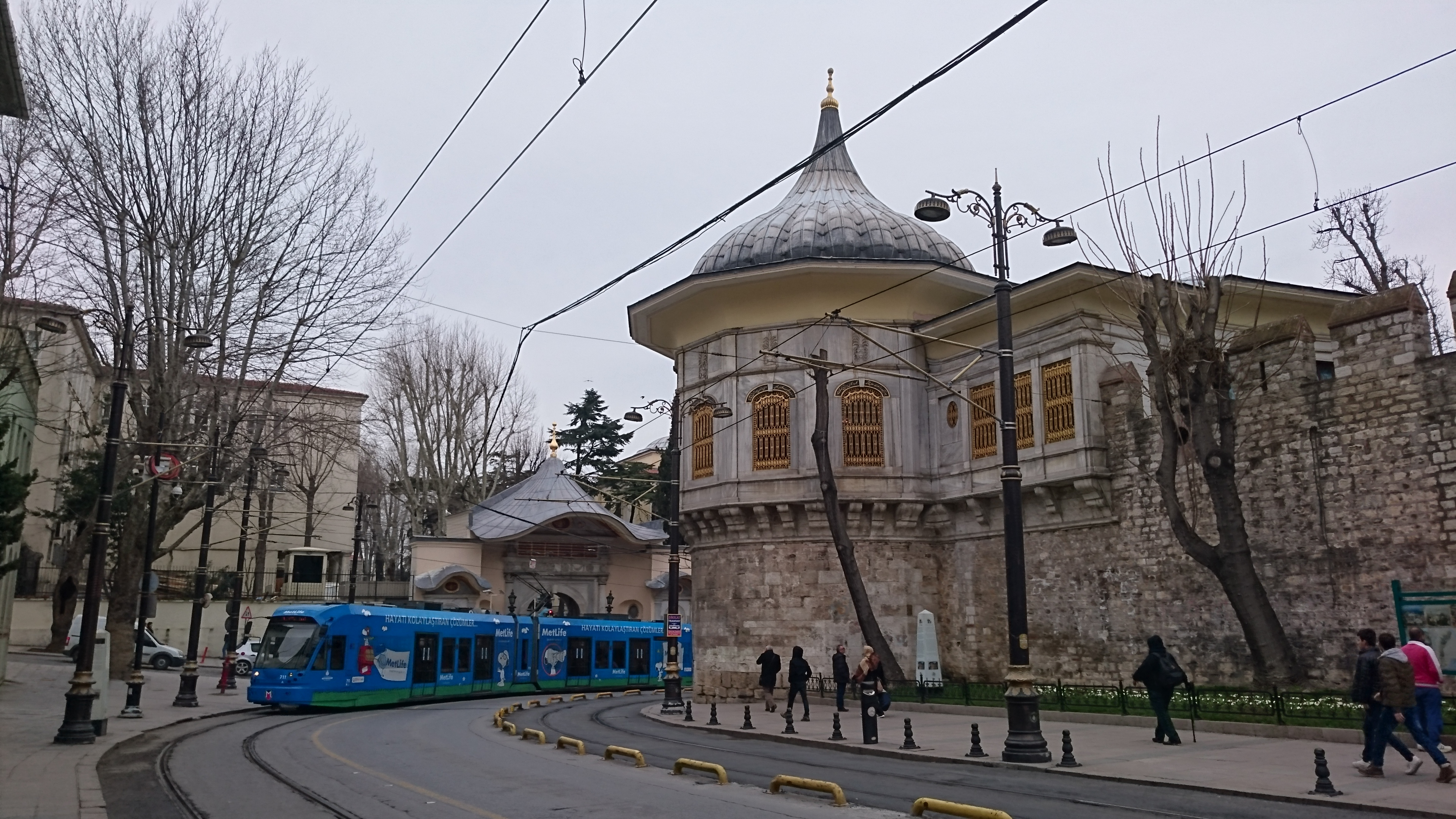
Procession Kiosk, across the Sublime Porte (left).

The Procession Kiosk (Turkish: Alay Köşkü) is a 16th-century historical building on the outer walls of the Gülhane Park next to Topkapı Palace in Istanbul, Turkey. It was used by the Ottoman sultans to receive the salute of processing janissary as well as a pleasure locale. The building is situated across the Sublime Porte.

In 2011, the building was transferred to the Ahmet Hamdi Tanpınar Literature Museum Library .

== Gallery ==
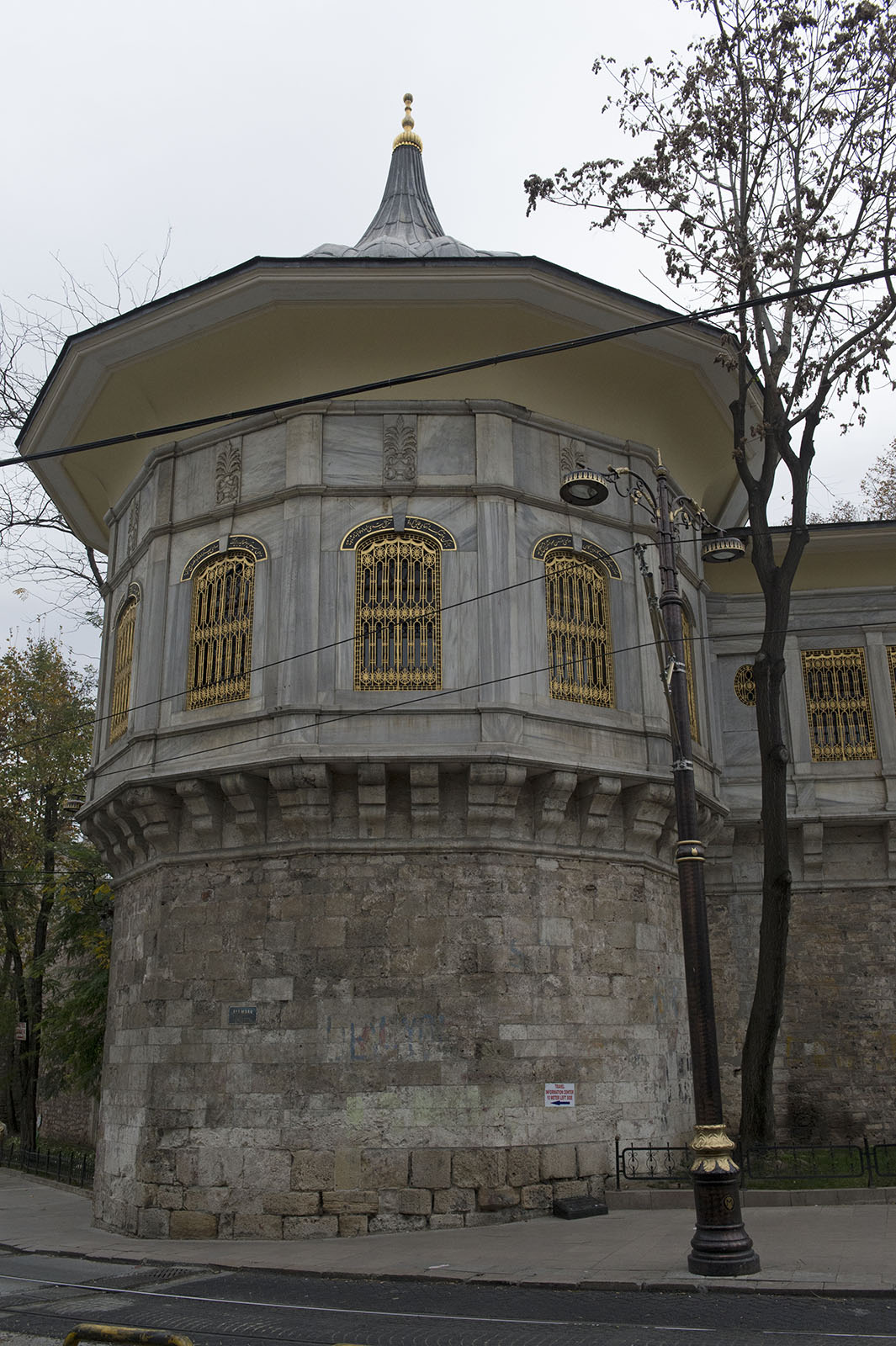
Procession kiosk exterior

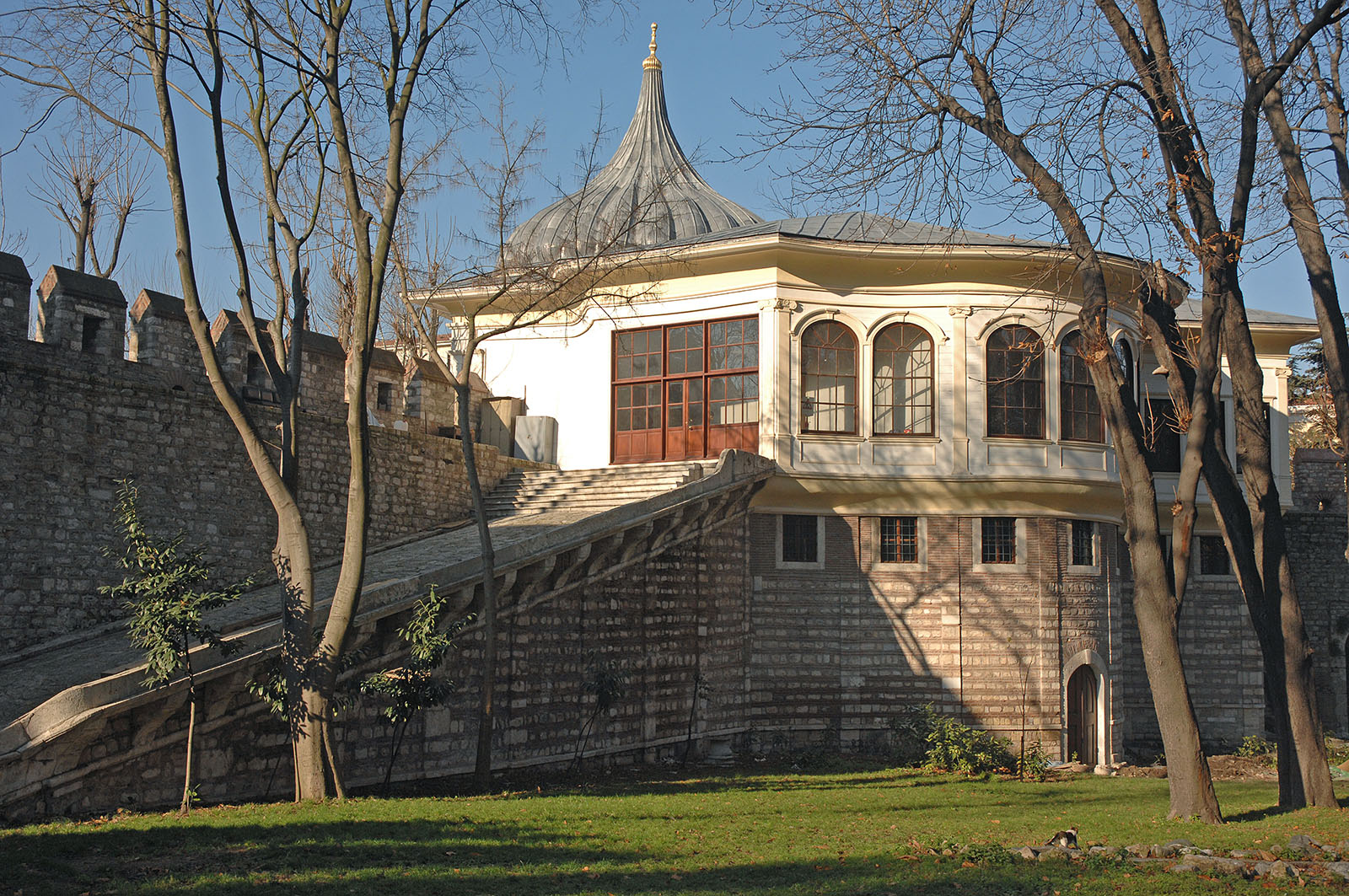
Procession kiosk from park

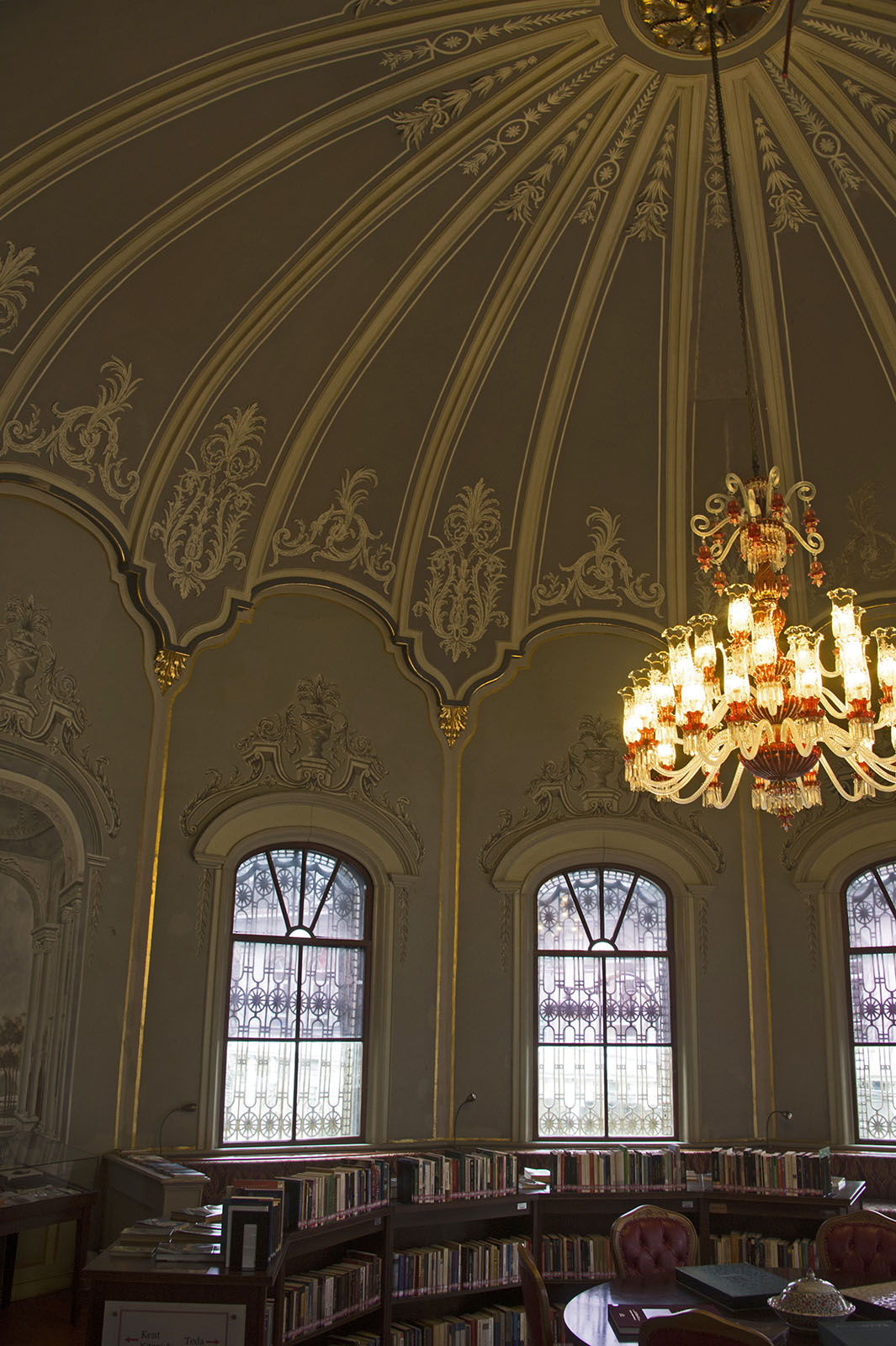
Procession kiosk Interior

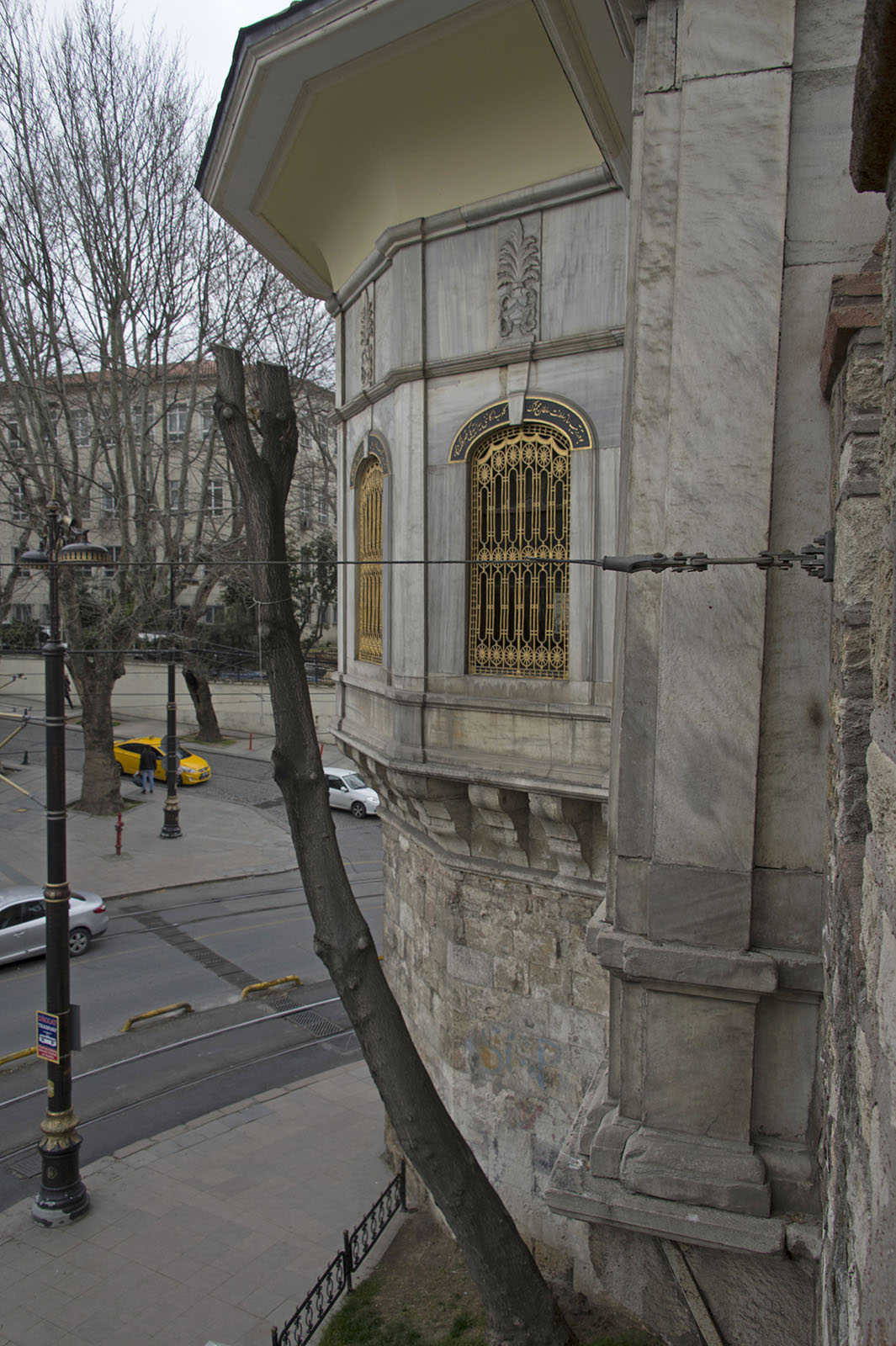
Procession kiosk exterior

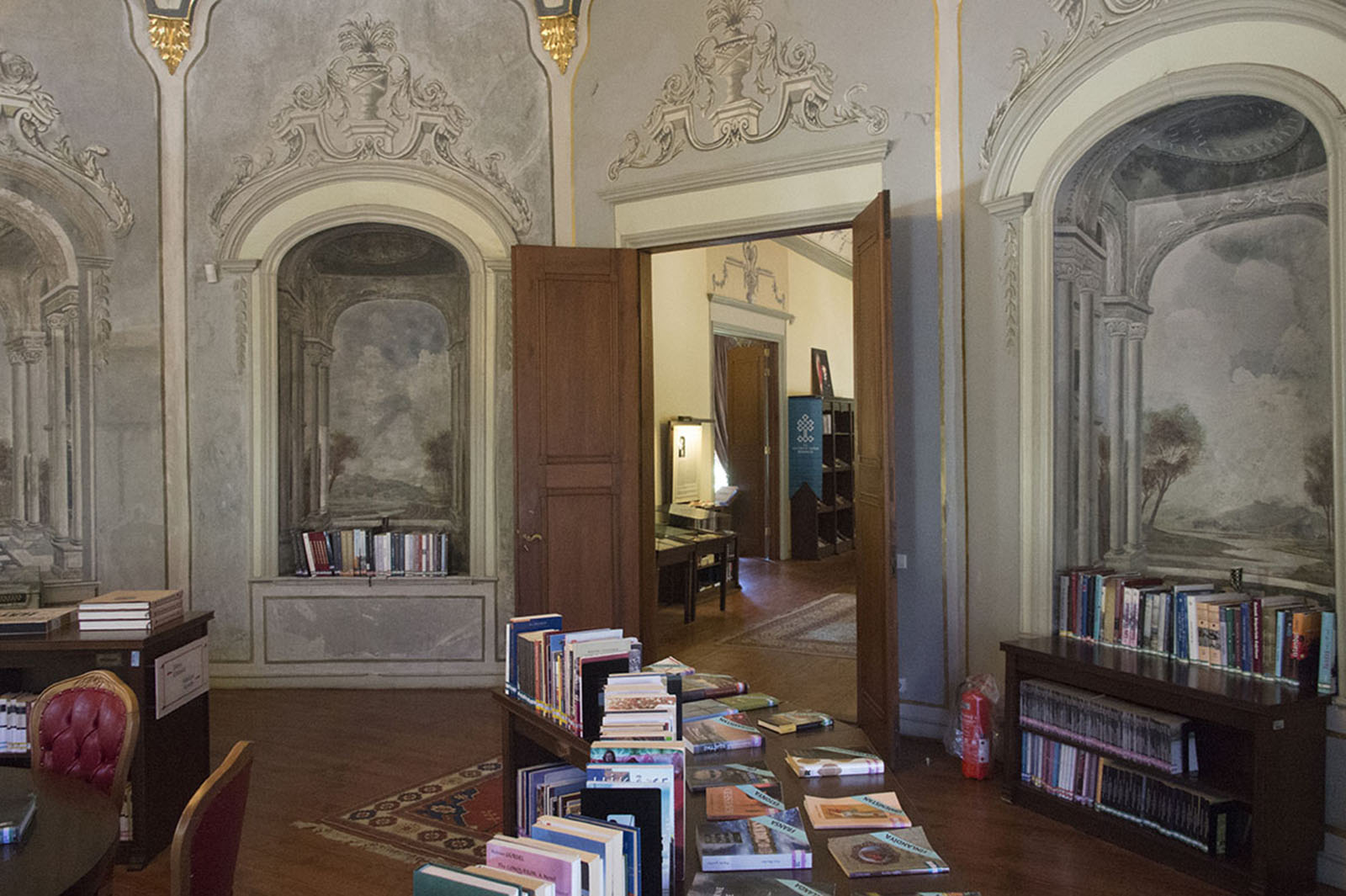
Procession kiosk interior

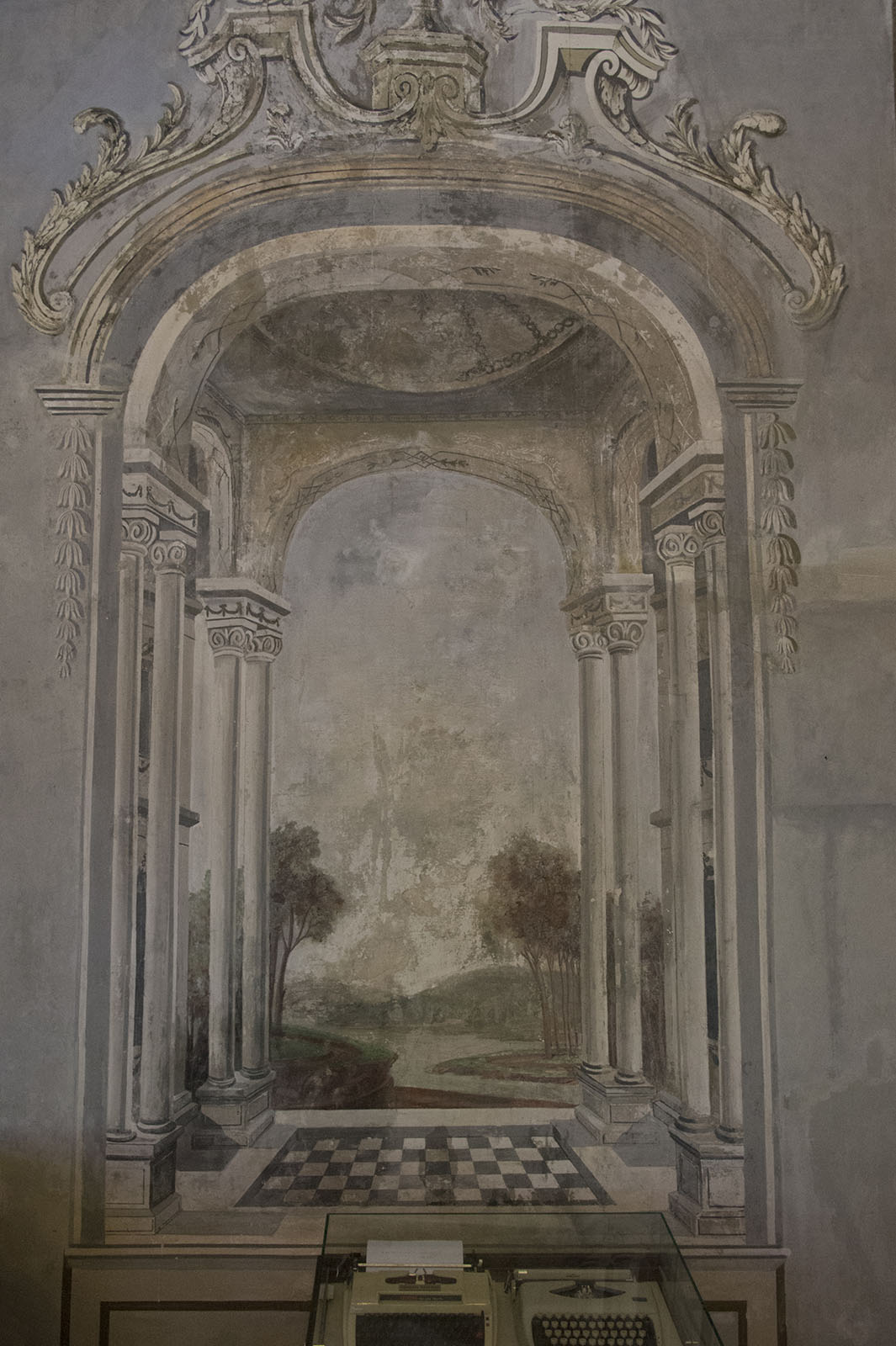
Procession kiosk Wall painting

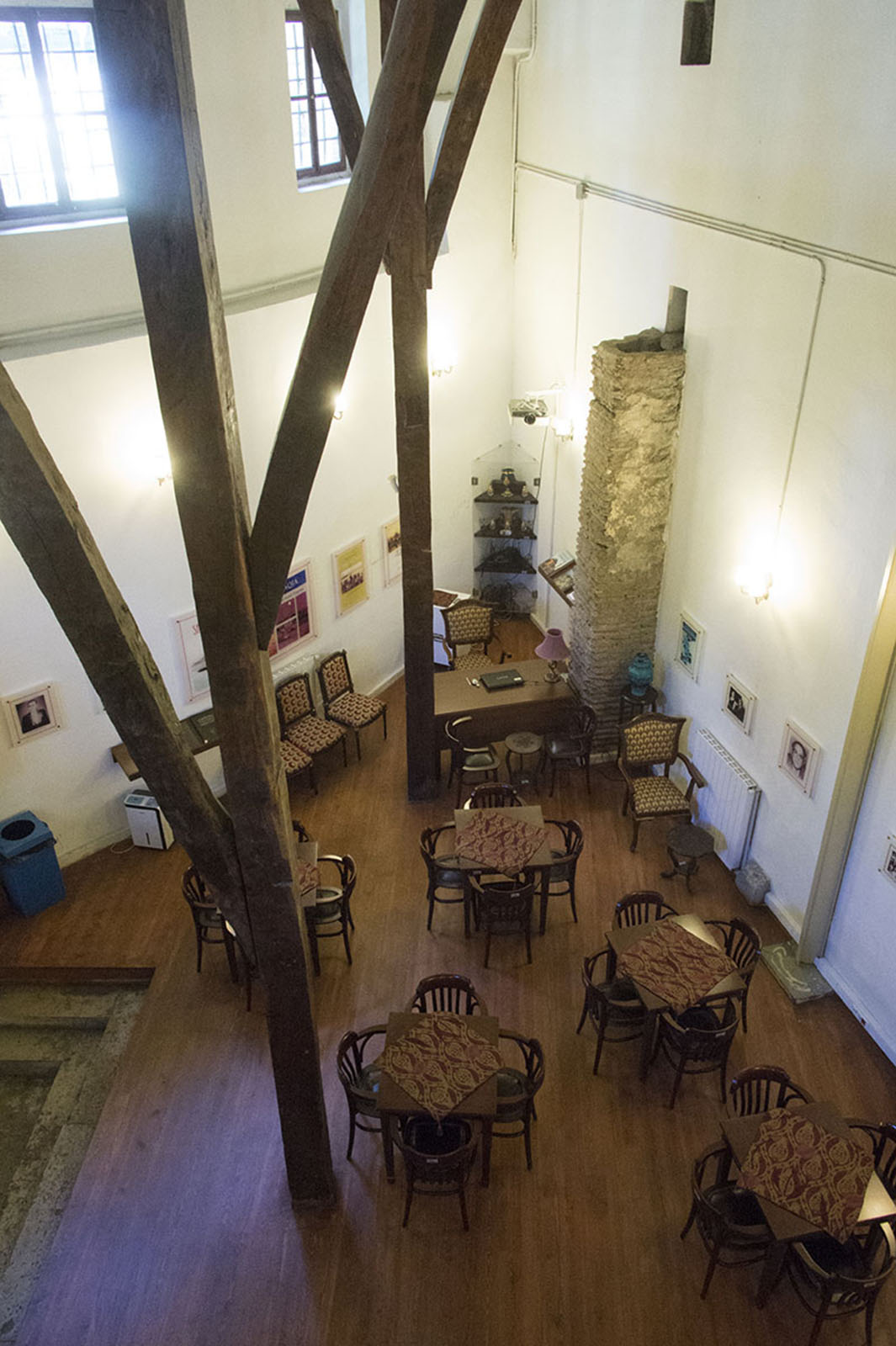
Procession kiosk Downstairs area

== See also ==
- Topkapı Palace

== Literature ==
- Fanny Davis. Palace of Topkapi in Istanbul. 1970. ASIN B000NP64Z2
- Necipoğlu, Gülru (1991). Architecture, ceremonial, and power: The Topkapi Palace in the fifteenth and sixteenth centuries. Cambridge, Massachusetts: The MIT Press. pp. 336 pages. ISBN 0-262-14050-0.
