= Cahit Sıtkı Tarancı Museum =

- Cahit Sıtkı Tarancı Evi Kültür Müzesi
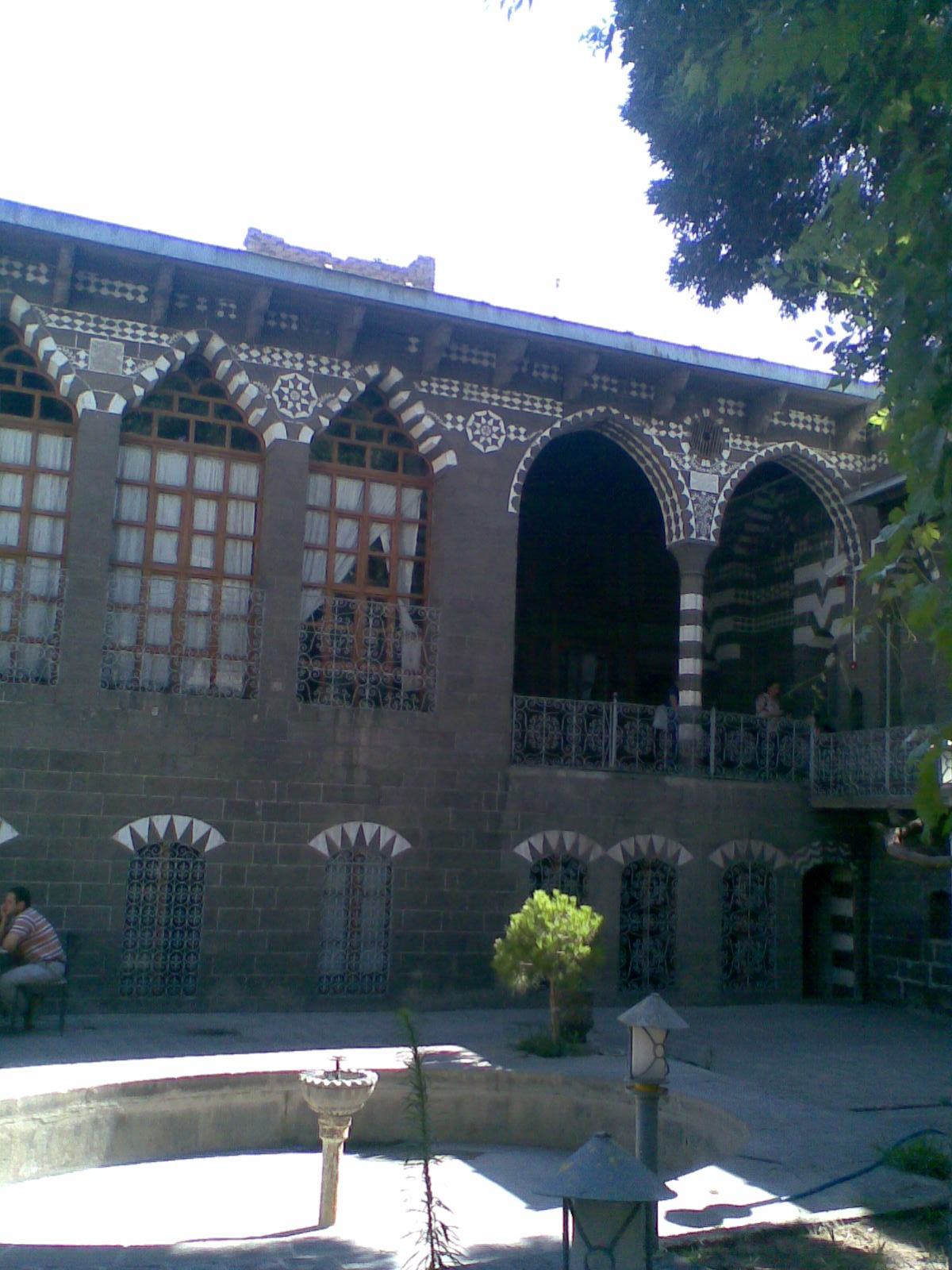
- Courtyard

- Cahit Sıtkı Tarancı Museum
- Established: 1973; 53 years ago
- Coordinates: 37°54′47″N 40°14′08″E
- Type: House Museum
- Owner: Ministry of Culture and Tourism

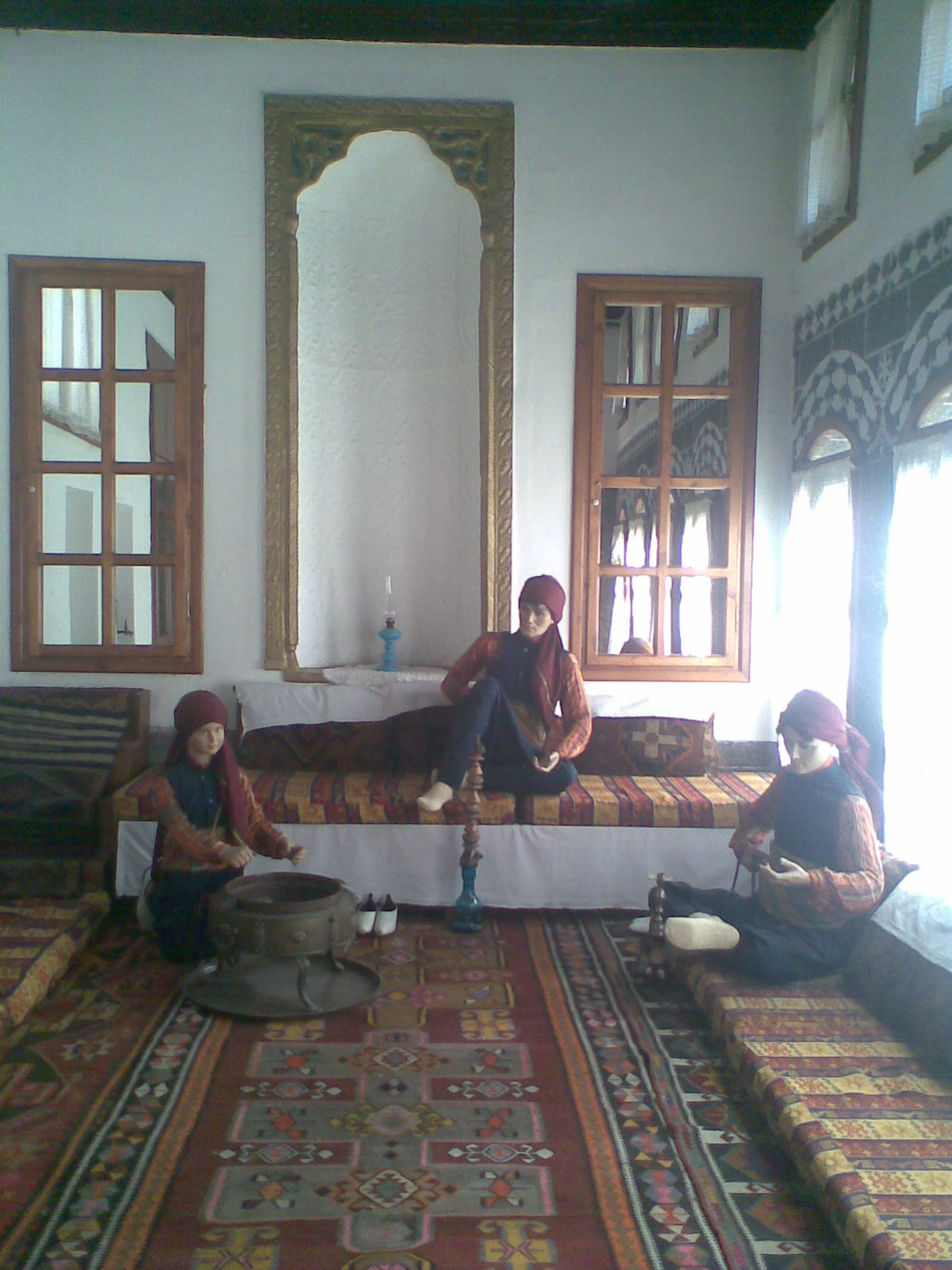
A typical room

Cahit Sıtkı Tarancı Museum (Turkish: Cahit Sıtkı Tarancı Evi Kültür Müzesi) is a historic house and museum dedicated to Cahit Sıtkı Tarancı in Diyarbakır, Turkey.

The museum is located in the historic Sur district of Diyarbakır, close to the Grand Mosque.

The museum building was the house where Cahit Sıtkı Tarancı (1910–1956), a well known poet, was born in. The building was constructed in 1733. It is a two-story house. The construction material is basalt stone. The building is composed of four symmetrical sections around a square courtyard. These parts are traditional living quarters in different seasons; north in summer, east in spring, south in winter and west in autumn. There are 14 rooms in the building. Cahit Sıtkı Tarancı was born in the biggest room, so called "başoda" (literally: main room), in the summer section.

In 1973, the house was purchased by the Ministry of Culture, and it was opened to visits on 29 October 1973, the 50th anniversary of the proclamation of the Republic. In 2003 it was restored.

The 152 exhibited items are the personal belongings of Cahit Sıtkı Tarancı and his family members.

== See also ==
- Ahmet Arif Literature Museum Library, a literary museum and archive dedicated to Turkish literature,
- Ziya Gökalp Museum, another historic house museum dedicated to Ziya Gökalp, a leader of the Turkish nationalist movement.
