= Yahya Kemal Beyatlı =

Turkish poet, author, politician and diplomat (1884-1958)

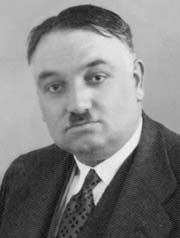
- Yahya Kemal Beyatlı, 1930s
- Born: Ahmet Âgâh; 2 December 1884; Skopje, Kosovo Vilayet, Ottoman Empire
- Died: 1 November 1958 (aged 73); Istanbul, Turkey
- Resting place: Aşiyan Asri Cemetery, Istanbul
- Occupations: Poet, politician, diplomat
- Writing career
- Pen name: Agâh Kemal, Esrar, Mehmet Agâh, and Süleyman Sadi

Yahya Kemal Beyatlı (born Ahmet Âgâh; 2 December 1884 – 1 November 1958), known by the pen name Yahya Kemal, was a Turkish poet, author, politician and diplomat.

== Early life and education ==
Yahya Kemal was born Ahmet Âgâh on 2 December 1884, in Skopje, then in the Kosovo Vilayet of the Ottoman Empire into an ethnic Turkish family originally from Anatolia. He wrote under pen names such as Agâh Kemal, Esrar, Mehmet Agâh, and Süleyman Sadi. He came from a prominent family, whose roots could be traced back to the Ottoman court, and he was educated at various private schools. He was a graduate of Vefa High School, Istanbul.

As he was about to start his higher education, severe disagreements between his parents kept him away from school for some time. When he tried to return to school, he was turned away because it was too late into the semester. His absence from school coincided with the oppressive regime of Abdülhamit II (reigned 1876–1909), and Yahya Kemal got involved in various anti-regime movements. To avoid getting arrested, he went to Paris in 1903. During his time abroad, he met other exiled Turkish intellectuals, politicians and writers. He traveled extensively in Europe, and was exposed to various cultures.

== Literary career ==
While in Paris, Yahya Kemal developed a fondness for literature and was influenced by the French romantic movement. He eventually decided that he wanted to write poetry, and he first studied the historical works of the French Parnasse poets. Consequently, he sought out a way to revitalize Turkish Divan poetry in order to create smooth and pure poetic lines.

Yahya Kemal's poetry is influenced by music, because he composed with concepts borrowed from Turkish music. While explaining the inner rhythm of the poetic language, he used musical terms such as Tınnet, which denoted the musical value of the sounds or words that pace a line of poetry. For Yahya Kemal this was the only method for creating internal harmony. He states, "Poetry is akin to music. Poetry is not made of couplets, but poetry is melody." For the most part, he was consistent and practiced what he preached; in his poetry, music and meaning go hand-in-hand.

The central thought that runs through his poems and prose is that the Turkish nation is fashioned with the sweat and tears of the heartland. Even his love poems featured stylized historical and cultural values. Another peculiarity in Yahya Kemal's poetry is the almost feminine sensibility that he displayed towards Islam. His explanation for this is that his father spent very little time with him, and that his first lessons in religion came from long hours spent talking with his mother. Yahya Kemal grew up in a household where hymns and chants were sung, where values of the past were kept alive, hence in his poems he used religion and esthetics together.

Writing about the loss of Ottoman lands like Thessaloniki, Bitola, Skopje and Pristina he wrote:

When I pass my youth in Balkan towns
I felt a yearning with every breath
I took. Byron's sad melancholy rules my heart then.
In youth's daydreams I roamed the mountains
Breathed the free air of Rakofça's fields.
I felt the passion of my raiding ancestors
Every summer, for centuries, a run to the North
That has left a thundering echo in my breast.
While the army was in defeat, the whole country in mourning
A conqueror's thought entered my dreams every night
Feelings of melancholy, a sad remnant of the flight."

When he returned to Istanbul in 1912, Yahya Kemal was already known as a master poet, and the change of regime in the country provided him with opportunities in various high-level governmental positions. By 1915, he came to know Halide Edib Adıvar as well as Yusuf Akçura, both renowned Turkish authors. In the same year, he also worked closely together with Ziya Gökalp at the Istanbul University, where he was nominated a professor for the History of Western Literature upon the recommendation of Gökalp.

Yahya Kemal founded a literary magazine, Dergâh, in 1921 together with another significant figure Ahmet Haşim.

== Political career ==
After the foundation of Turkey, Yahya Kemal became a member of parliament for the provinces of Urfa (1923–1926), Yozgat (1934), Tekirdağ and Istanbul (1943). After the Surname Law came into effect in 1934, he adopted the surname "Beyatlı".

In 1926, he was appointed ambassador to Poland, where he remained until 1929. He was ambassador to Portugal between 1930 and 1932, also acting as Envoy Extraordinary and Minister Plenipotentiary in Madrid. In 1947, he was appointed as the first Turkish ambassador to Pakistan.

== Illness and death ==
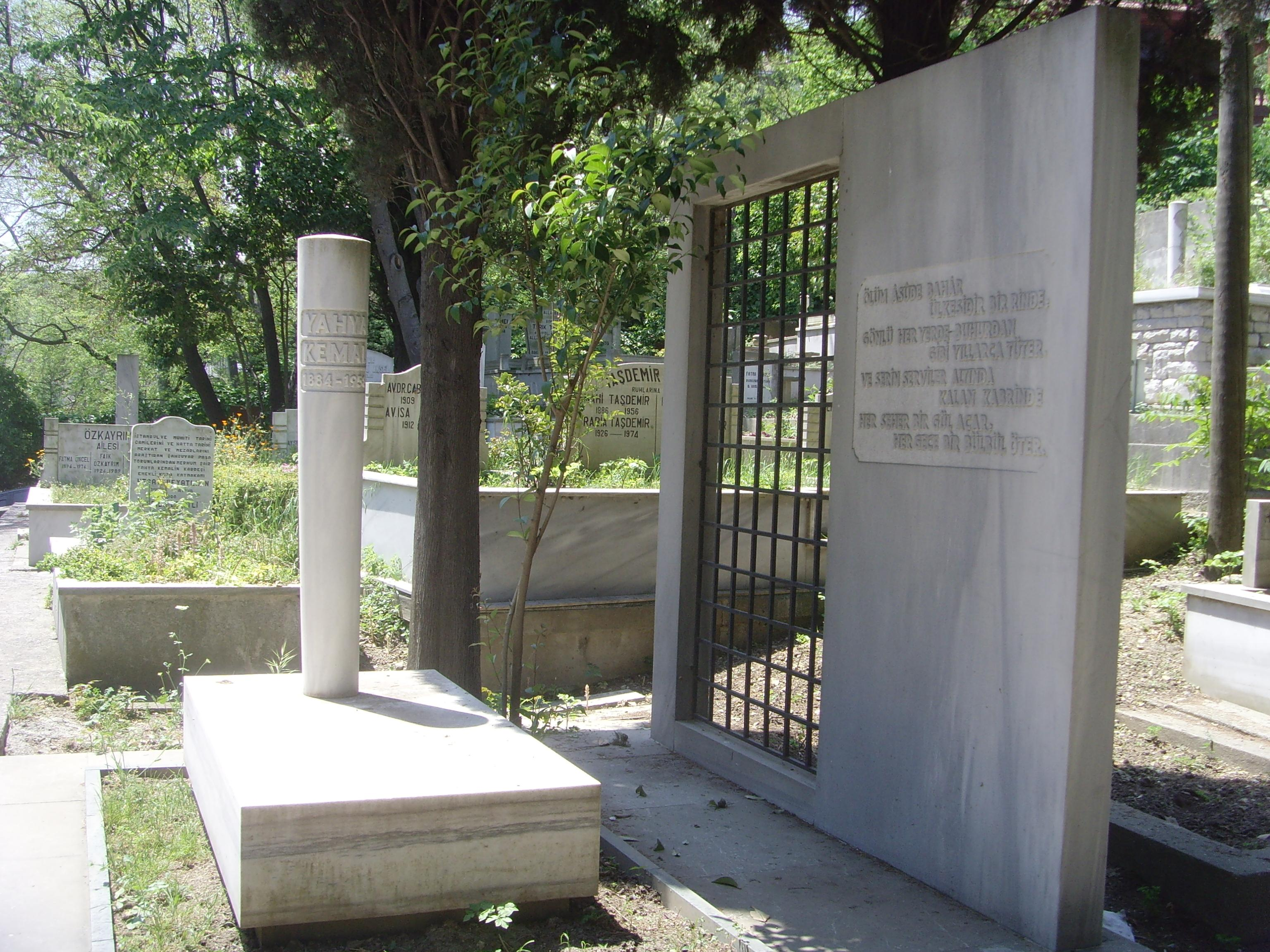
Yahya Kemal's grave in Aşiyan Asri Cemetery

While in Pakistan, Yahya Kemal's health got progressively worse, and he returned to Turkey in 1949. His medical condition was never properly diagnosed and his health was never fully restored.

He died on 1 November 1958, in Istanbul, and was buried in the Aşiyan Asri Cemetery.

== Works ==
Prose

- Aziz İstanbul (1964)
- Eğil Dağlar (1966)
- Siyasi Hikayeler (1968)
- Siyasi ve Edebi Portreler (1968)
- Edebiyata Dair (1971)
- Tarih Müsahabeleri (1975)
- Bitmemiş Şiirler (1976)

Memoirs

- Çocukluğum, Gençliğim, Siyasi ve Edebi Hatıralarım (1973)

Translations into English

- Selected Poems of Yahya Kemal. Trans. S. Behlül Toygar. Istanbul, 1962 (2nd ed., 1965).

== See also ==
- List of contemporary Turkish poets
- The Silent Ship
