= Ahmet Arif Literature Museum Library =

Literary museum and archive in Diyarbakır, Turkey

- Ahmet Arif Ersoy Edebiyat Müze Kütüphanesi
- Established: June 1, 2011; 15 years ago
- Location: Ziya Gökalp Sok., Sur, Diyarbakır, Turkey
- Coordinates: 37°54′46″N 40°14′08″E
- Type: Literary, biographical
- Owner: Ministry of Culture and Tourism

The Ahmet Arif Literature Museum Library (Turkish: Ahmet Arif Edebiyat Müze Kütüphanesi) is a literary museum and archive dedicated to Turkish literature and named after the poet Ahmet Arif (1927–1991). Located in Diyarbakır, Turkey, the museum was established by the Ministry of Culture and Tourism and opened on June 1, 2011.

The museum is housed in a historical house of typical-Diyarbakır architecture called the Hacı Halid Konağı (literally Hajji Halid Mansion), which is more than 120 years old. It is situated in Camii Kebir neighborhood of Sur district next to the Cahit Sıtkı Tarancı Museum. The 6-room building with stoa facing the center is designed in quadratic form surrounding a large courtyard. It covers an area of 360 m^{2} (3,900 sq ft) including the courtyard. The building is considered to have served as home of Ahmet Arif. The restoration of the building for this purpose cost ₺93,000 while another ₺75,000 were spent for its decoration and furnishing.

The museum is dedicated to the life and works of Ahmet Arif, of who some personal belongings are on display. In addition, photographs of notable authors from southeastern Anatolia are exhibited. The library accommodates more than 2,000 books and 60 periodicals, including books on history and literature. At the museum library, discussions on various authors, poetry performances and writing workshops are held. By nine months of the year, visitors are able to read their books under the huge walnut tree in the courtyard in the center of the building.

The museum library in Diyarbakır is part of a network of institutions which are named after notable writers native to the region.

== See also ==
- Cahit Sıtkı Tarancı Museum, Diyarbakır
- Mehmet Akif Ersoy Literature Museum Library, Ankara
- Ahmet Hamdi Tanpınar Literature Museum Library, Istanbul
