= Atatürk Monument =

Atatürk Monument (Turkish: Atatürk Anıtı) is a monument or memorial dedicated to Mustafa Kemal Atatürk, the founder of modern Turkey. It may refer to:

- Atatürk Monument (İzmir), a monument in İzmir, Turkey
- Atatürk Monument (Kadıköy), a monument in Istanbul, Turkey
- Atatürk Monument (Mersin), a monument in Mersin, Turkey
- METU Atatürk Monument, Ankara
- Mustafa Kemal Atatürk Monument, Baku in Azerbaijan
- Mustafa Kemal Atatürk Monument, Mexico City
- Mustafa Kemal Atatürk Monument, Santiago in Chile

== Other uses ==
- Kemal Atatürk Memorial, Canberra, a monument in Canberra, Australia
- Republic Monument, a monument in İstanbul, Turkey
- Statue of Honor, a monument in Samsun, Turkey
- Victory Monument (Ankara), a monument in Ankara, Turkey
- Atatürk and Şerife Bacı Monument, a monument in Kastamonu, Turkey

== See also ==
- Statue of Atatürk (disambiguation)
