= Statue of Atatürk =

Statue of Atatürk may refer to the following monuments to Mustafa Kemal Atatürk:

- Statue of Atatürk (Gülhane Park), in Istanbul
- Statue of Atatürk (Sarayburnu), in Istanbul
- Statue of Atatürk (Sheridan Circle), in Embassy Row, Washington, D.C.
- Statue of Atatürk (Turkish Embassy, Washington), in Massachusetts Avenue

== See also ==
- Atatürk Monument (disambiguation)
