= Emin Erkul =

Ottoman Turkish surgeon and politician (1881–1964)

Emin Erkul (Mehmet Emin Erkulseyitoğlu)
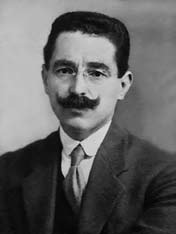
- Emin Erkul (before 1923)

Mayor of Istanbul
- In office 8 June 1924 – 12 October 1928
- Preceded by: Haydar Yuluğ
- Succeeded by: Mühittin Üstündağ

Personal details
- Born: Mehmet Emin; 1881 Grevena, Servia Sanjak, Ottoman Empire (today in Greece)
- Died: 3 June 1964 (aged 82–83) Istanbul, Turkey
- Resting place: Merdivenköy Cemetery, Kadıköy, Istanbul
- Education: Medicine
- Alma mater: Ottoman Military Medical Academy
- Occupation: Surgeon, civil servant, politician, executive
- Profession: Physician

Mehmet Emin Erkulseyitoğlu (1881, Grevena, Servia, Ottoman Empire – 3 June 1964, Istanbul, Turkey), best known as Emin Erkul, was an Ottoman Turkish military surgeon, national militia force member, parliament member, civil servant and mayor of Bursa and Istanbul.

== Personal life and education ==
Mehmet Emin was born to Yahya Arşivi and his spouse Hasbiye in Grevena district of Servia Sanjak, Ottoman Empire (today in Greece) in 1881. His father was a tax office manager in Erzurum vilayet and Edirne.

After completing his primary education in his hometown, he moved to Istanbul, and attended the military junior high school of Soğukçeşme and later the Military High School of Çengelköy. Then, he studied at the Ottoman Military Medical Academy, graduating in August 1905 in the rank of a Captain.

He was fluent in Greek, French, English and German languages.

== Career in medicine (1905–1918) ==
On 6 December 1905, he was appointed as an assistant physician to the Surgery Department at the Gülhane Military Hospital in Istanbul. He received a certificate of surgeon on 28 July 1906. He was appointed assistant to the German physician at the hospital, Georg Deycke (1865–1938), called Deycke Pasha, on 15 June 1908. He went in 1909 to Hamburg, Germany for specialization in surgery with encouragement by the German physician at the hospital, Julius Wieting (1868-1922), called Wieting Pasha. On the way of his journey, he attended the Budapest International Medical Congress. The cleaning method of surgical field with iodine he learned there was introduced into Turkish medical literature. After completing his specialist training, he returned to his country, and became a hospital surgeon on 12 November 1909. Afterwards, he was appointed as the second surgical diseases teacher at the Gülhane Military Hospital, and as an assistant surgical diseases teacher at the Ottoman Military Medical Academy, and he worked as a substitute teacher for about one and a half years.

In 1910, he resigned from military service citing health reasons, and repaid the costs of his military medicine education. He continued his medical career with the private hospital he opened in Afyonkarahisar, established a second private hospital in Konya due to the interest he received. He entered state service again when he was assigned to the Hospital of Red Crescent in Skopje during the Balkan Wars in 1912 and 1913. However, he could not start his duty because the city was no longer under Ottoman rule. In 1913, he was appointed as the health director of Bursa Province, where he would serve for many years. In 1914, he pioneered the establishment of the medical association called "Hüdâvendigar Etibba Cemiyeti" ("Court Physician Society") at Bursa Gureba Hospital (Hospital for the Poor), where he worked. In 1915, he assumed the duty of acting mayor of Bursa for about six months. During this short term as mayor, he provided important services to the city. In 1917, he was appointed as the chief physician of Bursa Gureba Hospital, and during the same period, he served as the chief physician of Bursa Military Convalescent and Range Hospital. Towards the end of 1917, he was dismissed from his duties as a physician and surgeon at Bursa Gureba Hospital, and was appointed as the Health Director of Batumi (today in Georgia) in 1918. However, he did not fulfill his duties in Batumi due to his resignation.

He was awarded many times by the Ottoman state for his successful activities in Bursa. He was awarded the gold Navy Medal twice for his contributions to the "Donanma-yı Osmanî Muavenet-i Millîye Cemiyeti" ("Association of National Assistance to the Ottoman Navy"), one of the important organizations of the Ottoman Empire. On the other hand, he was awarded the silver medal of "Osmanlı Hilâl-i Ahmer Cemiyeti" ("Ottoman Red Crescent Society"), of which he was the president of Bursa branch. In addition to the Navy and Red Crescent medals, he received the gold Medal of Merit for the successful surgery he performed on the Libyan Sheikh Senussi (1873–1933), the supreme leader of the Senussi order.

== National struggle period (1918–1920) ==
He assumed important duties during the transition from the Ottoman Empire to the Republic and the early years of the new Republic era.

He participated in the resistance movement that began after the Armistice of Mudros was signed on 30 October 1918 following the defeat of Ottoman Empire in World War I. In this context, he took his place on the front of the Turkish War of Independence. He was among the members of the Redd-i İlhak Cemiyeti (Society for Rejection of Annexation), founded in Bursa under the leadership of Colonel Bekir Sami (Günsav) after the occupation of İzmir by the Greek forces on 15 May 1919. He took part in the administrative board of the organization that was transformed into the Müdâfaa-i Hukuk Cemiyeti (Association for Defence of National Rights) after the Sivas Congress on 4 to 11 September 1919. Thus, he made significant contributions to the organization of the national struggle in Bursa Province.

== Politician (1920–1923) ==
He was nominated as the eighth candidate from Bursa for the assembly that was called the last Chamber of Deputies of the General Assembly of the Ottoman Empire in Istanbul and convened on 12 January 1920, however, he was not elected. In the election for the First Grand National Assembly in Ankara in 1920, where he was nominated again from Bursa, he was elected deputy by receiving the second highest number of votes in Bursa Province. He made 147 speeches in the parliament on various issues and submitted 13 parliamentary questions during the period. He was one of the most active deputies of the First Grand National Assembly in this context. Although some of his proposals and suggestions were subject to serious criticism at the time, it is seen that many of them were responded to by the new administration in the period after the proclamation of the Republic of Turkey on 29 October 1923.

He continued his political activities in the parliament with a political approach close to Mustafa Kemal Pasha during the national struggle period. He was a member of the "First Group" during the period when the parliament was divided into two ideological groups, and carried out his work in line with the aims of this group. He was also among the founders of the General Salvation Committee, which was implemented as one of the measures considered during the period when the discipline in the parliament was disrupted.

He assumed responsibilities on the military side of the national struggle as well as the political side. He had the opportunity to apply his military medical training on the fronts and, despite not having anymore military rank, he performed surgeries on wounded soldiers as the only operatosurgeon on the Western Front until the Second Battle of İnönü (23 March – 1 April 1921). On the other hand, he made efforts to meet the needs of the army for bayonet and other logistic in a small-scale production facility he established with some of his fellow deputies.

He was awarded many medals by the state in previous periods, and the Medal of Independence in the process following the declaration of the Republic. He was deemed worthy of the red-green-ribbon medal by the Grand National Assembly of Turkey both for being a deputy in the First Grand National Assembly and for his struggles under fire as the honorary surgical advisor and surgeon of the Western Front.

Although nominated by Mustafa Kemal Pasha himself, he was not able to enter the parliament in the elections of the Second Grand National Assembly on 28 June 1923. He continued his activities in Bursa, was elected for the second time as a member of the Bursa Provincial Administrative Council, and carried out works for the revival of the city that was liberated from Greek occupation.

== Mayor of Istanbul (1924–1928) ==
He became the first mayor appointed to Istanbul by the Republican regime on 5 June 1924, and continued this duty until 19 January 1926. Coming to power in Istanbul, the most established and populous city of Turkey, during a period described as the "preparatory phase" of the Republican municipality, he provided important services to the city by portraying an active administrative profile.

During his term, intensive efforts were made to meet the city's needs for sewage, water and health. A magazine called Istanbul Şehremaneti Mecmuası (Magazine of Istanbul City Hall) was published, and the works and operations related to city life were shared with the public. During this period when the world's municipality systems were constantly monitored, intensive efforts were made for Istanbul to rise to the status of developed cities, he translated Edouard Joyant's book Traite d'Urbanisme from French and published under the title Urbanizm. Furthermore, since this period coincided with the years of the young Republic full of successive reforms in political, economic and social aspects, in addition to his municipal services, he also undertook the task of preparing Istanbul for reforms in accordance with directives from Ankara. In this context, he was directly assigned by Mustafa Kemal Pasha to make the necessary preparations in Istanbul before the social reform for the change of headgear and dress. He issued a circular on 29 August 1925, stating that all municipal officials and members should abandon the fez, and come to work wearing hat. Thus, the officials working in the Istanbul Municipality started wearing hats almost three months before the "Hat Law" was published on 25 November 1925. He had given a motion to wear a hat instead of a fez during the period he was serving as a deputy in Ankara.

He commissioned the erecting of the Aatürk Monument at Seraglio Point, created by the Austrian sculptor Heinrich Krippel (1883–1945). It was opened on 3 October 1926 as the first monument of Mustafa Kemal Atatürk in Turkey.

He resigned from the Istanbul mayorship on 12 October 1928, citing health reasons, although the real reason was political.

== Executive and physician again (1928–1950) ==
He then became the chairman of the board of directors of the Yıldız Music Hall, which he had licensed during his term as mayor. After the closure of the music hall, he entered business life by opening an office. After a while, he closed it down and returned to his medical profession.

He treated his patients in his clinic in Çemberlitaş, Fatih, and performed his surgeries at the Italian Hospital near Tophane. On 3 March 1932, he was elected to the board of directors of "Milli Reasurans", a reinsurance company, which was established by the Türkiye İş Bankas in 1929 for the nationalization of insurance business. He served as a member, vice president, and president until 29 March 1950. On 1 January 1934, he was elected to the board of directors of the Ottoman Bank, and served in this position until 10 July 1953.

He was elected to the honorary membership of the Association of Military Surgeons of the United States (AMSUS) on 2 Ma 1939, and was presented with a certificate and medal of membership at a ceremony held in Washington D.C., United States. He was deemed worthy of the "Honorary Citizenship of Bursa" by the Bursa Municipality Council on 7 February 1947. He was among the founders of the Touring and Automobile Club of Turkey and the Turkish Chess Federation Association. He was also the owner of the Turkish Chess Magazine and, served as the editor-in-chief of the magazine. He was the representative and founder of the American College in Türkiye.

== Later years and death ==
Erkul wanted to continue his political activities that he had paused after his term as Mayor of Istanbul. In the 1950 Turkish general election, he ran for a seat in the parliament as an independent deputy from Bursa, but failed. Eleven years later, he tried to run for a seat in the 1961-established Senate of the Republic as an independent member from Istanbul. As he lost in the 1961 Turkish Senate election, he applied to the president Cemal Gürsel (in office 1960–1966), who had the right to appoint 15 quota members within his authority. Erkul stated that he was exposed to inequality of opportunity during the election process, and asked for a quota membership, which was rejected.

Erkul died in Istanbul on 3 June 1964. He was buried in the family grave at the Merdivenköy Cemetery following the religious service held at Osmanağa Mosque in Kadıköy, Istanbul.

== Bibliography ==
- İnal, Melih (1 April 2011). Op. Dr. Emin Erkul'un Milli Mücadele Anıları (in Turkish). Zeus Kitabevi. p. 178. ISBN 978-605-890-695-2.

Political offices
Preceded by Haydar Yuluğ	Mayor of Istanbul; 8 June 1924 – 12 October 1928	Succeeded by Mühittin Üstündağ
