= Tree of Science (sculpture) =

Coordinates: 39°54′29″N 32°47′02″E

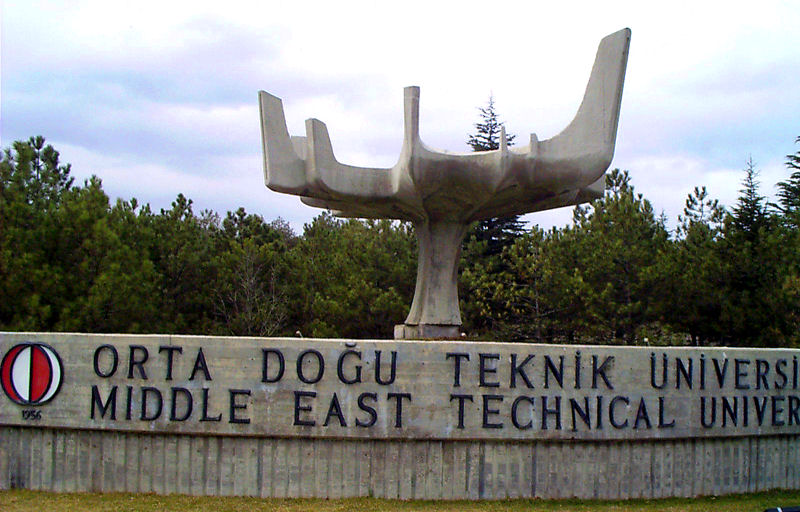
- Designer: Tamer Başoğlu
- Type: Sculpture

The Tree of Science (Turkish: Bilim Ağacı) is a Turkish sculpture at the Middle East Technical University Ankara Campus at the door of the monument Eskişehir Yolu. The sculpture was constructed through the second drop-Atatürk Monument Competition in 1966 and was made by Tamer Başoğlu.

At the time this sculpture was erected, much of the surrounding area was barren, but an intense forestation campaign was in progress, led by then university president Kemal Kurdas. Over the years around 12 million trees were planted on the 11,100 acre METU land. Thanks to this effort, the white Tree of Science is surrounded by the deep green of the forest that replaced arid brown hills. METU is now the largest green area around Ankara.

According to the Aga Khan Award for Architecture, shared in 1995 by Kemal Kurdaş and Behruz Çinici, the campus' planner and first architect, and Alattin Egemen, director of forestation, the forest helps mitigate the city's pollution.
