= Sarayburnu Park =

Park in Istanbul, Turkey

- Sarayburnu Parkı
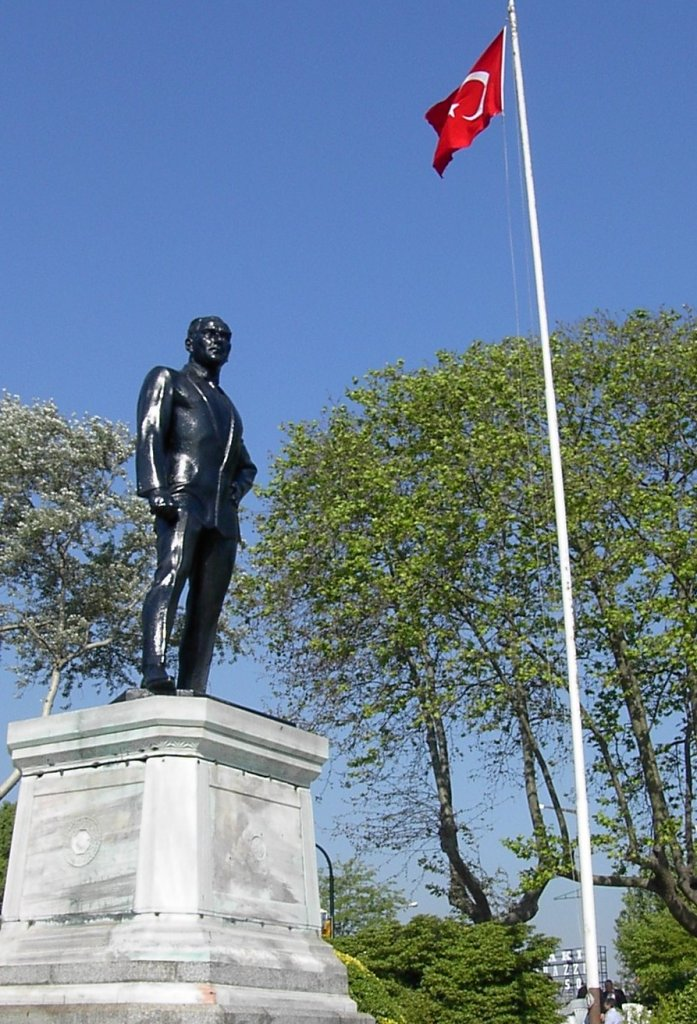
- The park's statue of Mustafa Kemal Atatürk
- Location: Istanbul, Turkey
- Coordinates: 41°01′00″N 28°59′11″E

Sarayburnu Park (Turkish: Sarayburnu Parkı) is a park in Istanbul, Turkey. The park has a statue of Mustafa Kemal Atatürk.

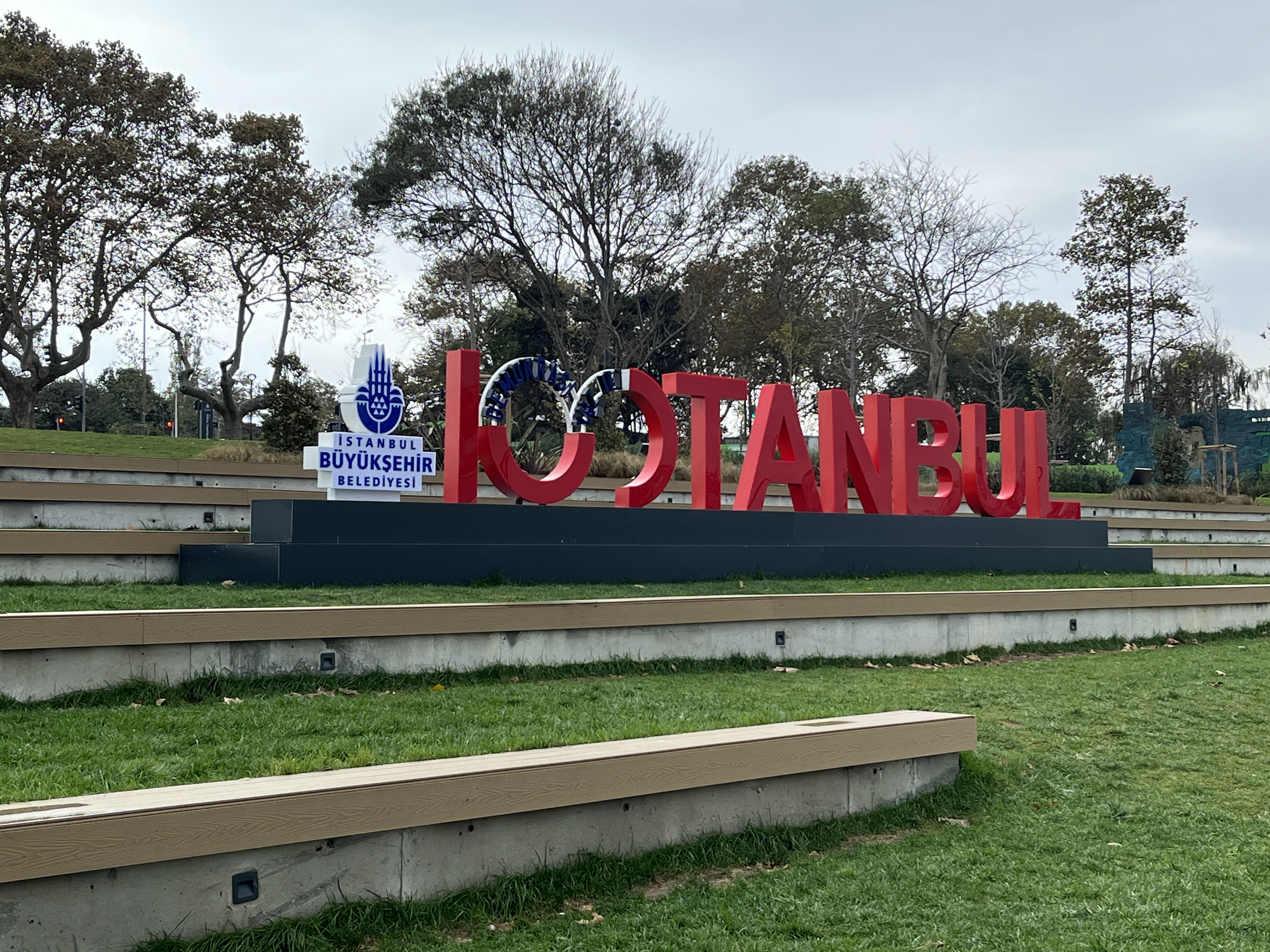

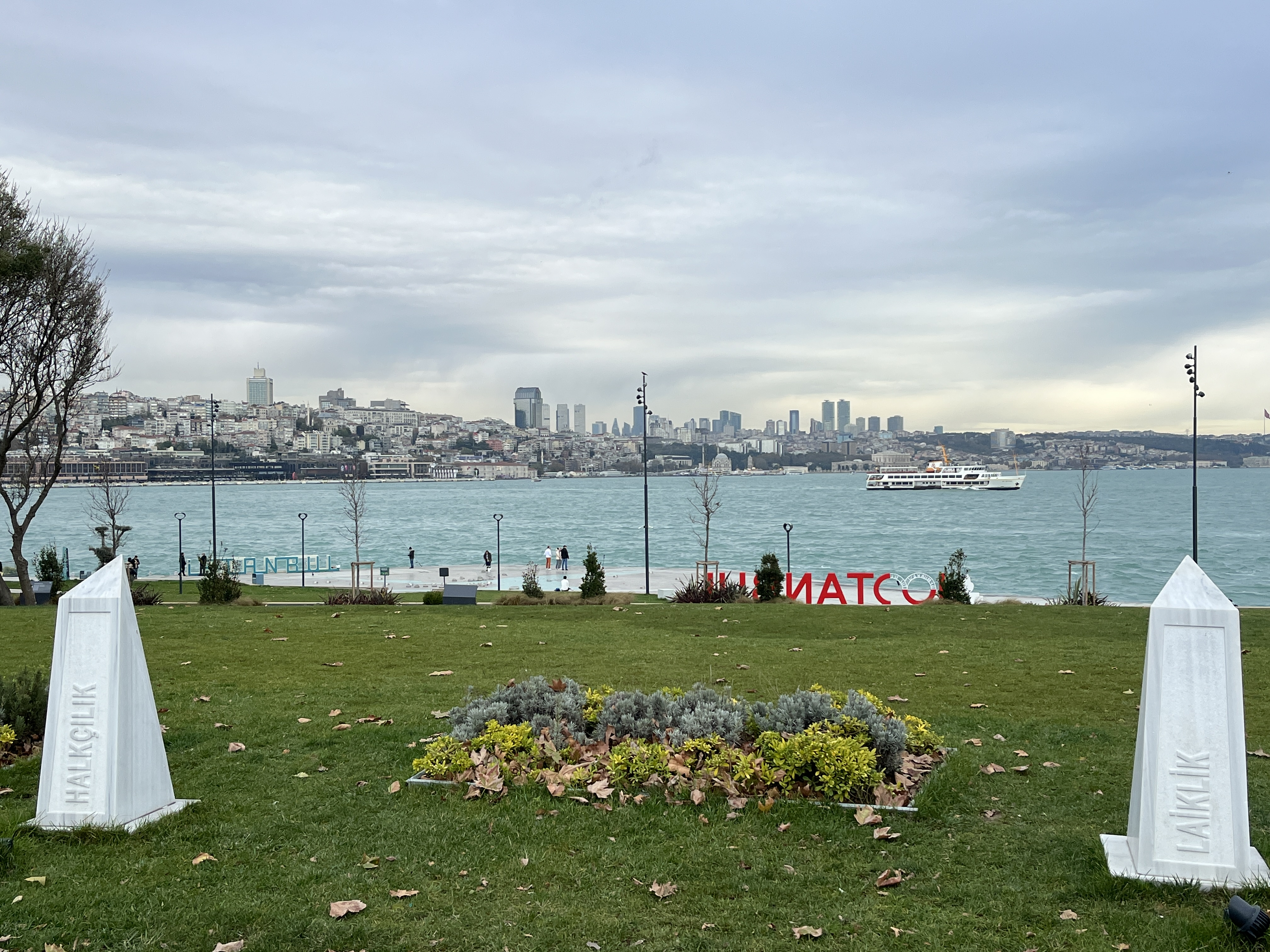
