= Ulus Square =

Square in Ankara, Turkey

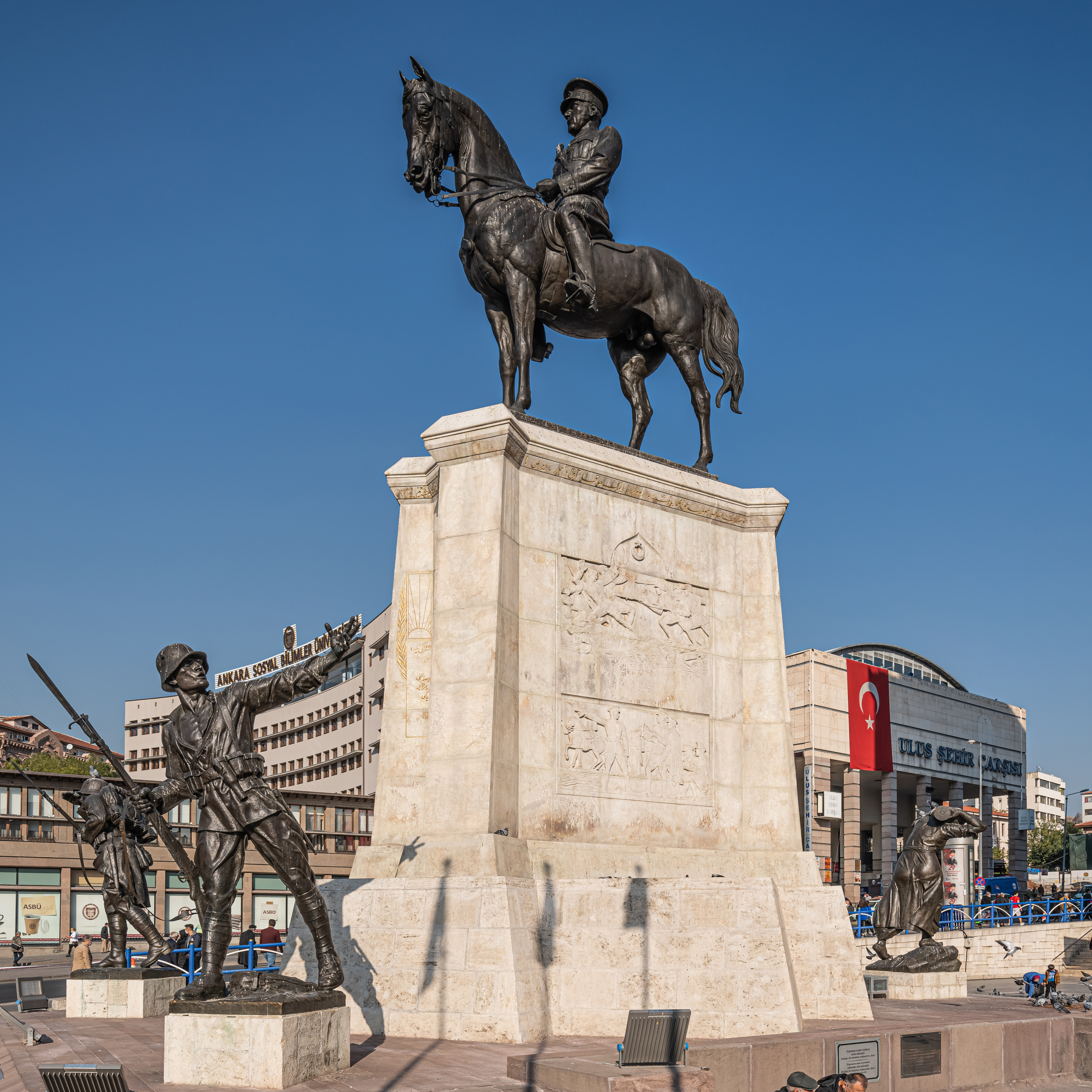
Statue of victory to the east of the square

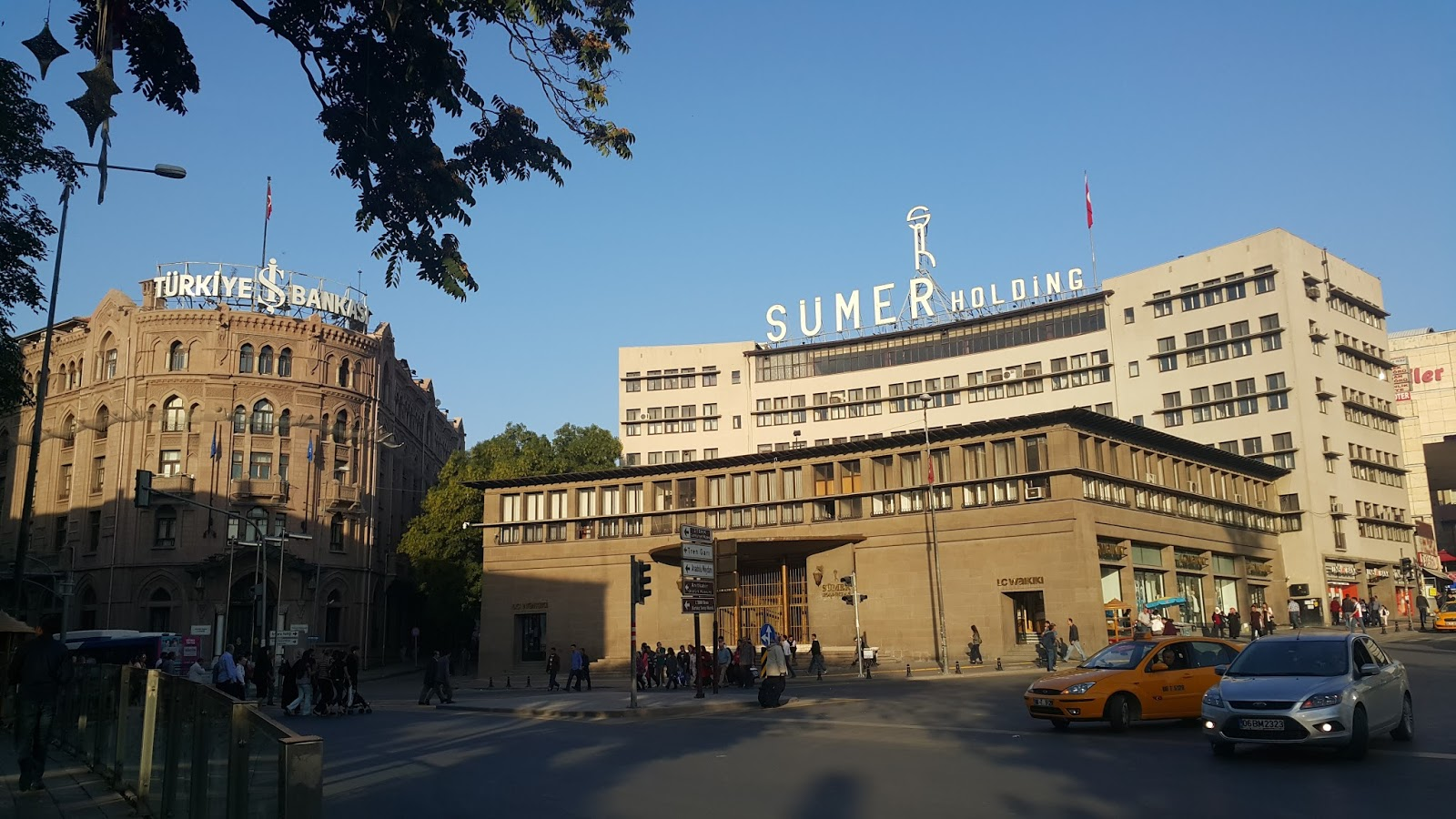
Opera Street and Ulus Square

Ulus Square (Turkish: Ulus Meydanı) is a square in Ankara, Turkey. "Ulus" is the Turkish word for "Nation".

== Geography ==
The square is actually a crossroad of four streets at about 39°56′30″N 32°51′16″E. The boulevard to south is Atatürk Boulevard and the street to the north which is the continuation of Atatürk Boulevard is Çankırı Street. The street to the south west is Cumhuriyet Street and the street to the east is Anafartalar Street. (Atatürk is the founder of modern Turkey, Çankırı is the name of a city to the north of Ankara, Cumhuriyet means Republic and Anfartalar was the location of a critical battle during the Gallipoli Campaign.) The only open area of the square is an area allocated to the Statue of Victory to the east of the square.

== History ==
Before the formation of Republic of Turkey, Ankara was a typical Anatolian town. The only important trade center of Ankara was Taşhan (i.e., "Stone inn") which was built in 1880s. The neighborhood around Taşhan was also called Taşhan. After Ankara was included in the railroad network in 1892, Taşhan became one of the most important quarters of Ankara and after the Young Turk Revolution the Committee of Union and Progress built its Ankara branch office building to the west of Taşhan. During the Turkish War of Independence this building was used as the parliament of Turkish nationalists. After the war a square was built to the east of the parliament building . The earlier name of the square was Hakimiyet'i Milliye ("National sovereignty") but eventually the name Ulus came into use. A statue was erected in the center of the square. The statue which was called Statue of Victory was designed by Austrian sculptor Heinrich Krippel was completed on 24 November 1927. In 1960s however the square was redesigned and the boulevard was shifted slightly to west, so that now the statue is to the east of the boulevard. After the passing of the surname law in 1934, the famous Taşhan family got their last name due to the "Stone Inn" that was located in the center of the square.

== Transportation ==
All public buses from center to north pass through Ulus Square. Although there is also a subway station named Ulus actually it is about 400 metres (1,300 ft) south of the square.

== Gallery ==
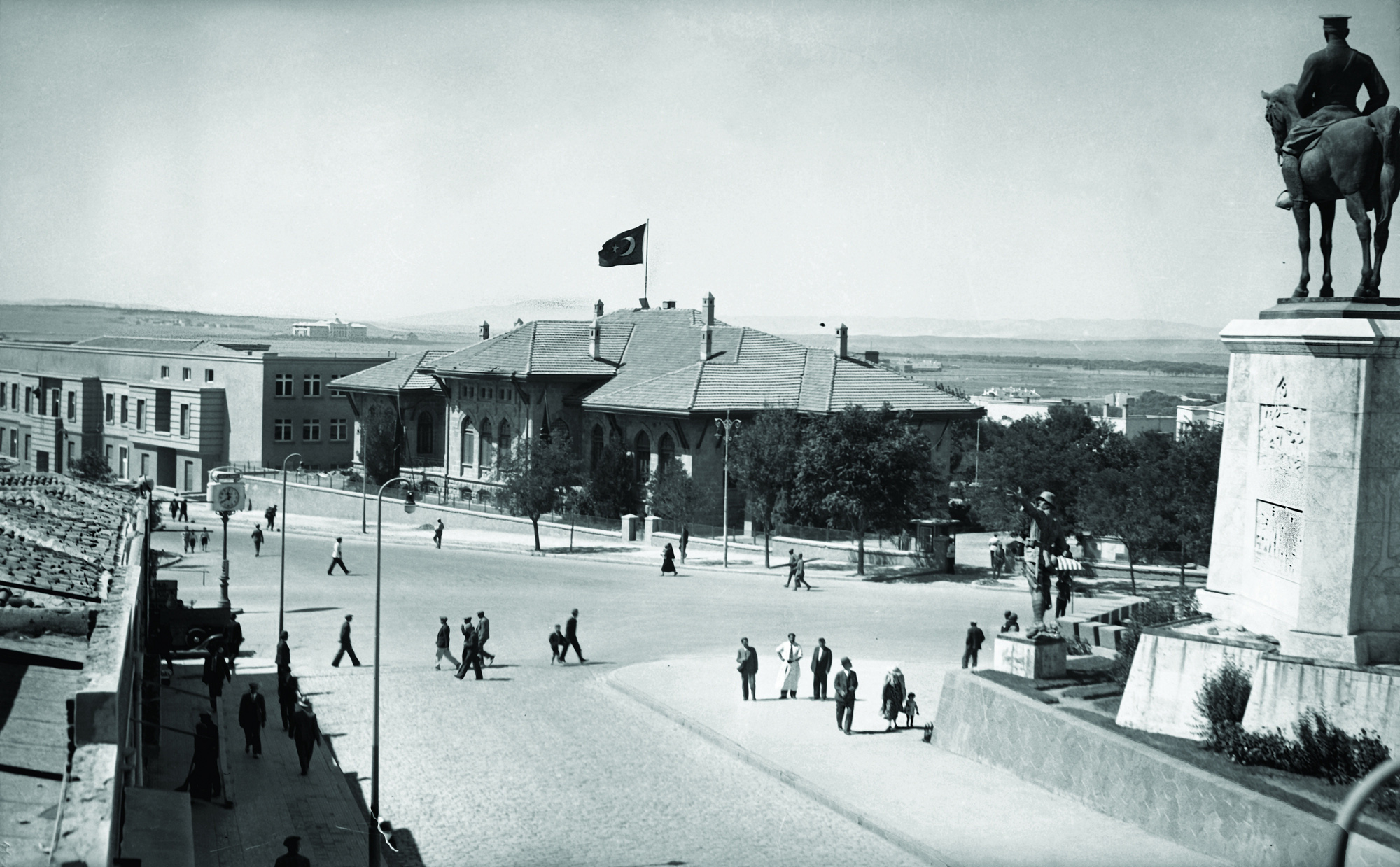
Ulus Square in 1930s

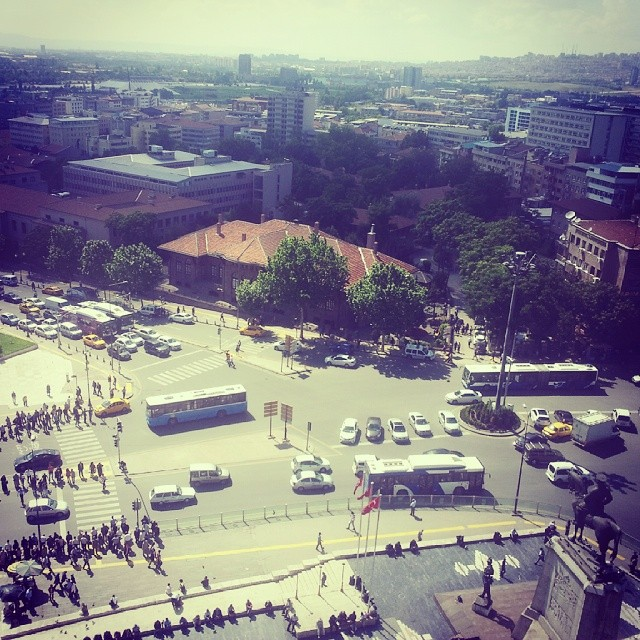
Former Parliament building to the west of the square

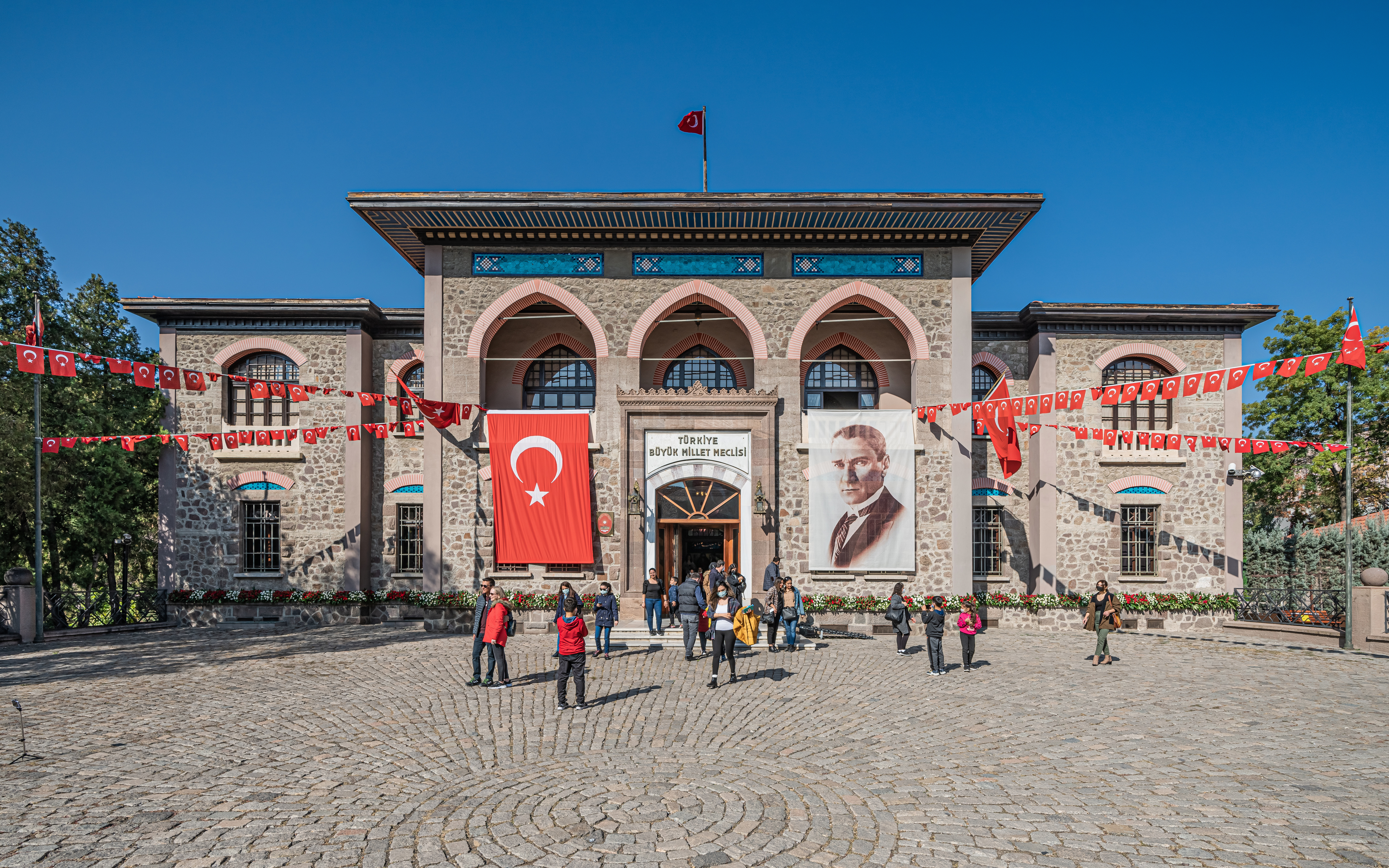
Former Parliament building to the west of the square

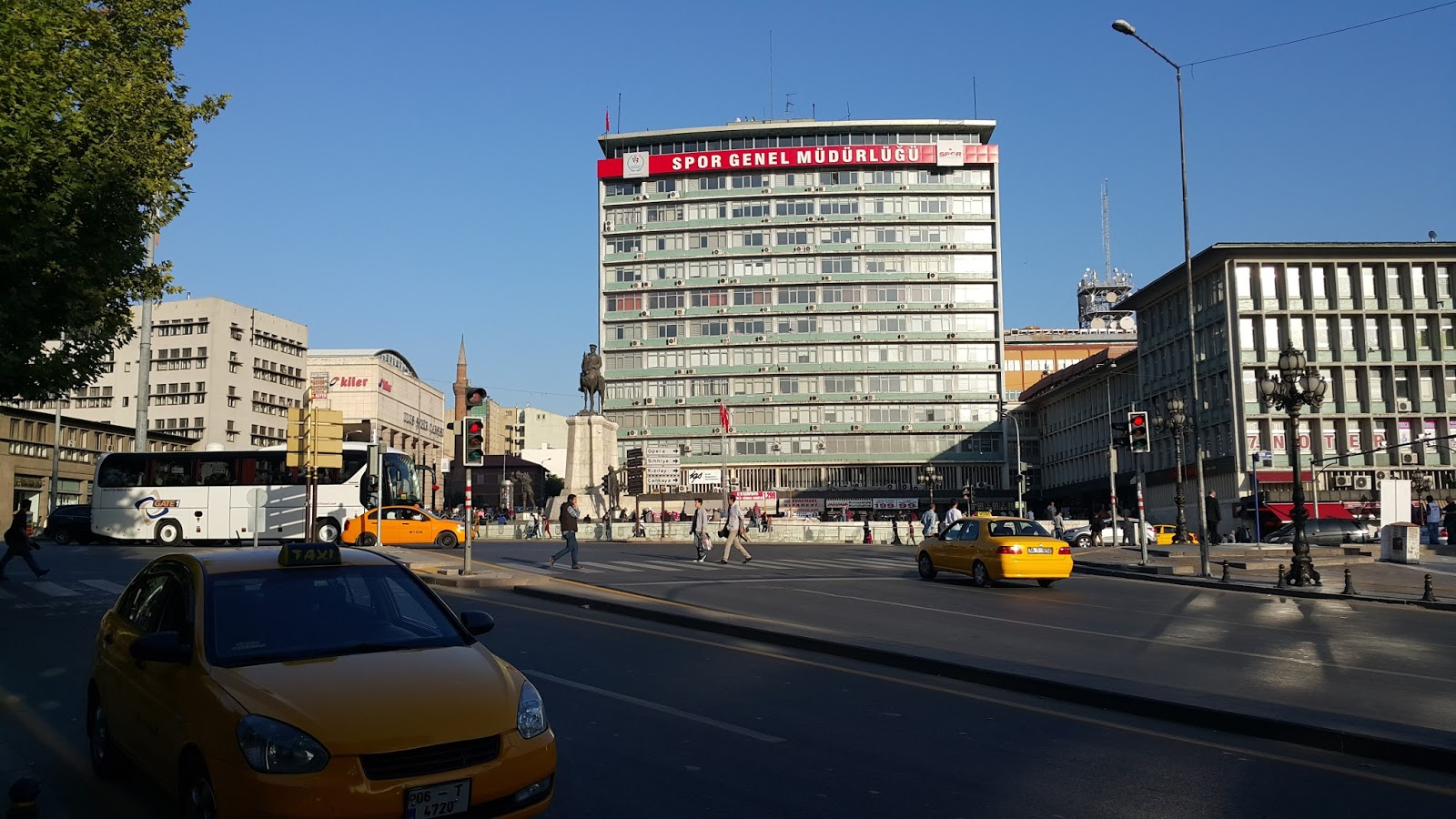
Ulus Square in 2015

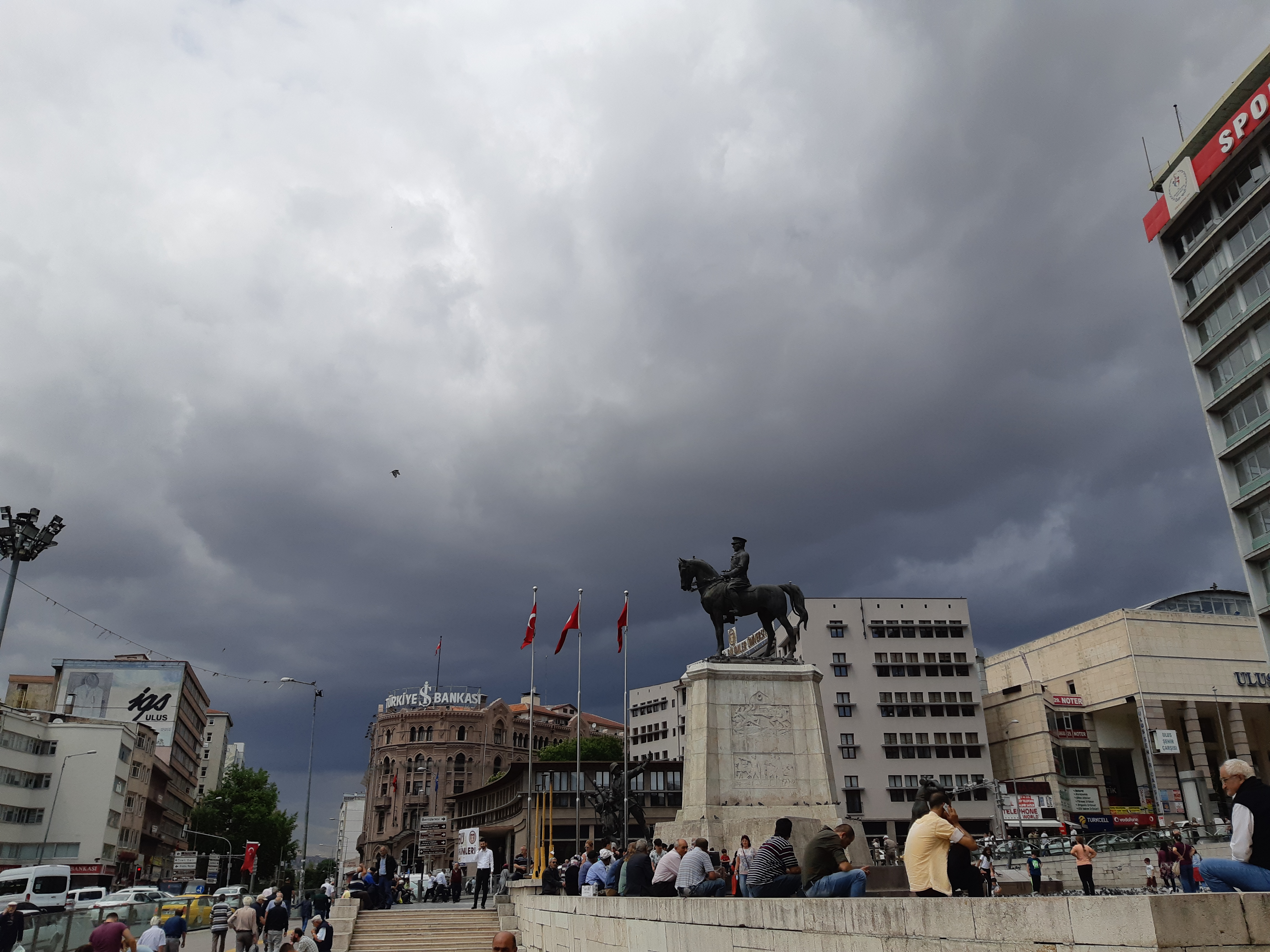
Ulus Square and Türkiye İş Bankası building in 2019
