= Statue of Atatürk (Sheridan Circle) =

Statue in Washington, D.C., U.S.

Mustafa Kemal Atatürk
- The statue in 2018
- Artist: Jeffrey L. Hall
- Year: 2013
- Type: Sculpture
- Medium: Bronze
- Subject: Mustafa Kemal Atatürk
- Dimensions: 200 cm (79 in)
- Location: Washington, D.C., United States; 38°54′42.33″N 77°03′02.85″W

A bronze statue of Mustafa Kemal Atatürk by the US artist Jeffrey L. Hall was installed in 2013 outside the Turkish Ambassador's Residence (1606 23rd Street NW), on the periphery of Sheridan Circle, in Embassy Row, Washington, D.C., United States. The building was formerly the Embassy of Turkey in Washington, D.C., from 1936 to 1989.

A second statue of Atatürk stands in Washington, D.C.: a fiberglass statue painted bronze, installed behind iron railings in front of the Embassy of Turkey, which is also located in Embassy Row.

== Description ==
The statue stands before a semicircular stone balustrade which bears a quotation from Atatürk: "Peace at Home / Peace in the World". Rather than depicting Atatürk in military uniform, the statue depicts Atatürk standing bare-headed in Western-style business dress of the 1930s, with a three-piece suit and necktie, pocket watch, and wingtip shoes, as if delivering a speech. He is holding the book Nutuk ("The Speech") in his left hand, with the title marked on the cover. The closed book is resting on his left hip, with one finger of the left hand marking his place, while he makes a pointing gesture with his right hand. His tie has the American-style stripes that Atatürk wore, running from the right shoulder to the lower left, and a military medal is emerging discreetly from behind his right lapel.

== History ==
Working at his studio in Virginia, Hall created three clay models of the statue, starting with a 12 in (30 cm) maquette, which he enlarged to a 34 in (86 cm) model, and then a full-size 6 ft 7 in (201 cm) model. Hall also made a full-size bust. The bronze was cast in several pieces and then welded together at the Laran Bronze foundry outside Philadelphia.

The statue was unveiled by the Atatürk Society of America (ASA) on November 10, 2013, commemorating the 90th anniversary of the founding of Republic of Turkey in 1923, and the 75th anniversary of Atatürk's death on November 10, 1938. The installation was supervised by Turkish-American architect Nuray Anahtar.

== See also ==
- 2013 in art
