= Statue of Honor =

Monument at Atatürk Park in İlkadım district of Samsun, Turkey

- Onur Anıtı
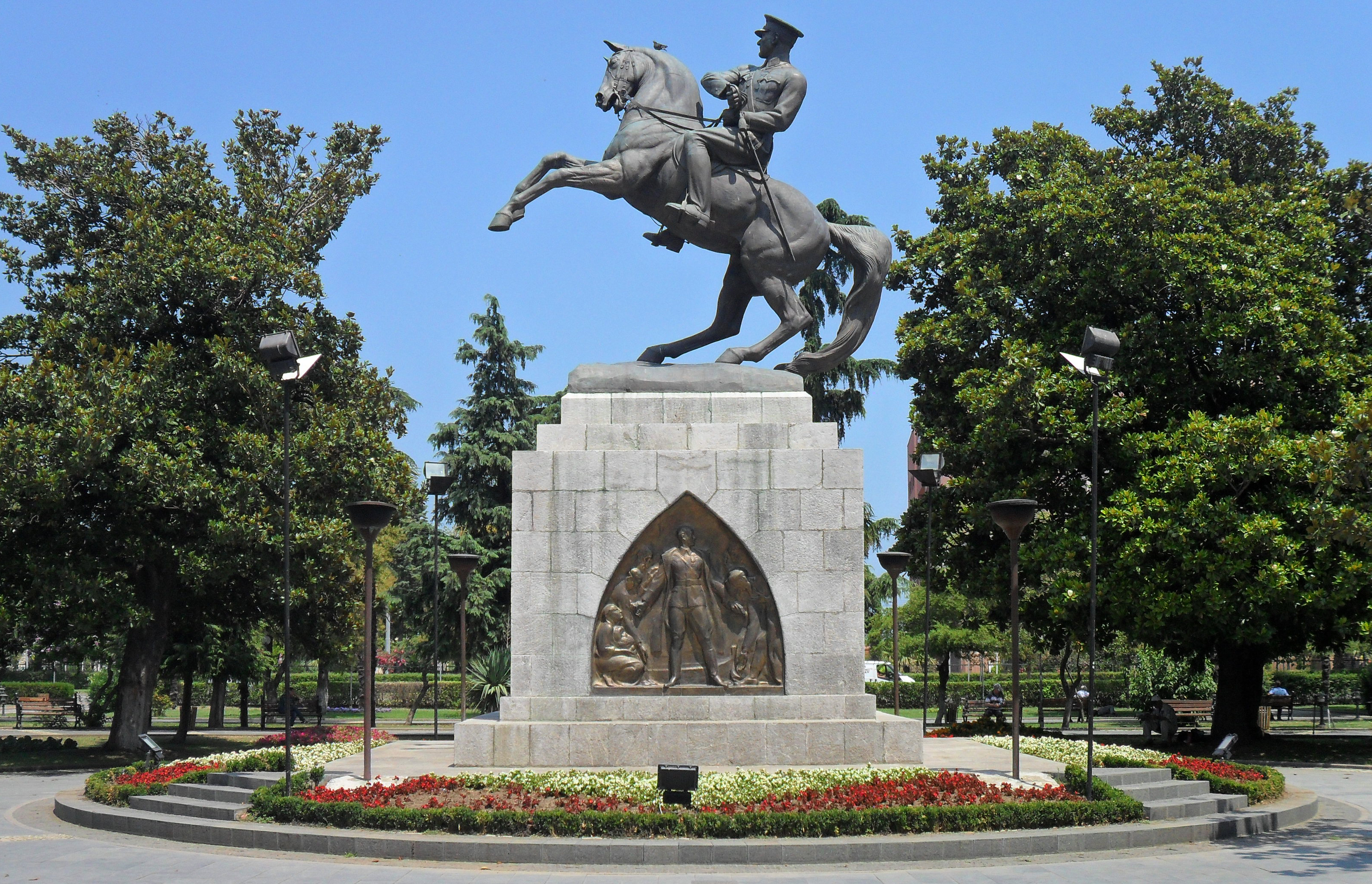
- Statue of Honor in Samsun
- Interactive map of Statue of Honor
- Location: İlkadım, Samsun, Turkey
- Coordinates: 41°17′20.6″N 36°20′11.3″E
- Designer: Heinrich Krippel
- Type: Equestrian statue
- Material: Bronze on marble base
- Height: 8.85 m (29.0 ft)
- Beginning date: 1927
- Completion date: October 29, 1931
- Opening date: January 15, 1932; 94 years ago
- Dedicated to: Landing of Mustafa Kemal Atatürk initiating the Turkish War of Independence on May 19, 1919

Statue of Honor (Turkish: Onur Anıtı), aka Atatürk Monument, is a monument situated at Atatürk Park in İlkadım district of Samsun, Turkey dedicated to the landing of Mustafa Kemal Atatürk in Samsun initiating what is later termed the Turkish War of Independence. The monument became a landmark of Samsun.

== History ==
The equestrian statue of Mustafa Kemal Atatürk was commissioned in 1927 by the province governor of Samsun, Kâzım Pasha (İnanç) to the Austrian sculptor Heinrich Krippel, who had won the juried art competition to create the Victory Monument in Ankara depicting equestrian Atatürk. The construction of the bronze statue took place in Vienna from 1928 to 1931. It was mounted on its base in Samsun on October 29, 1931, the Republic Day. The monument was officially inaugurated on January 15, 1932. It is the thirteenth monument to Atatürk and Krippel's fourth artwork in Turkey.

The bronze statue depicting equestrian Mustafa Kemal Atatürk is 4.75 m (15.6 ft) high while the total height of the monument is 8.85 m (29.0 ft). In addition to the honorary to the artist of US$5,500, the construction of the monument cost US$37,000.

The statue's metal casting process was carried out at Vereinigte Metallwerke in Austria.

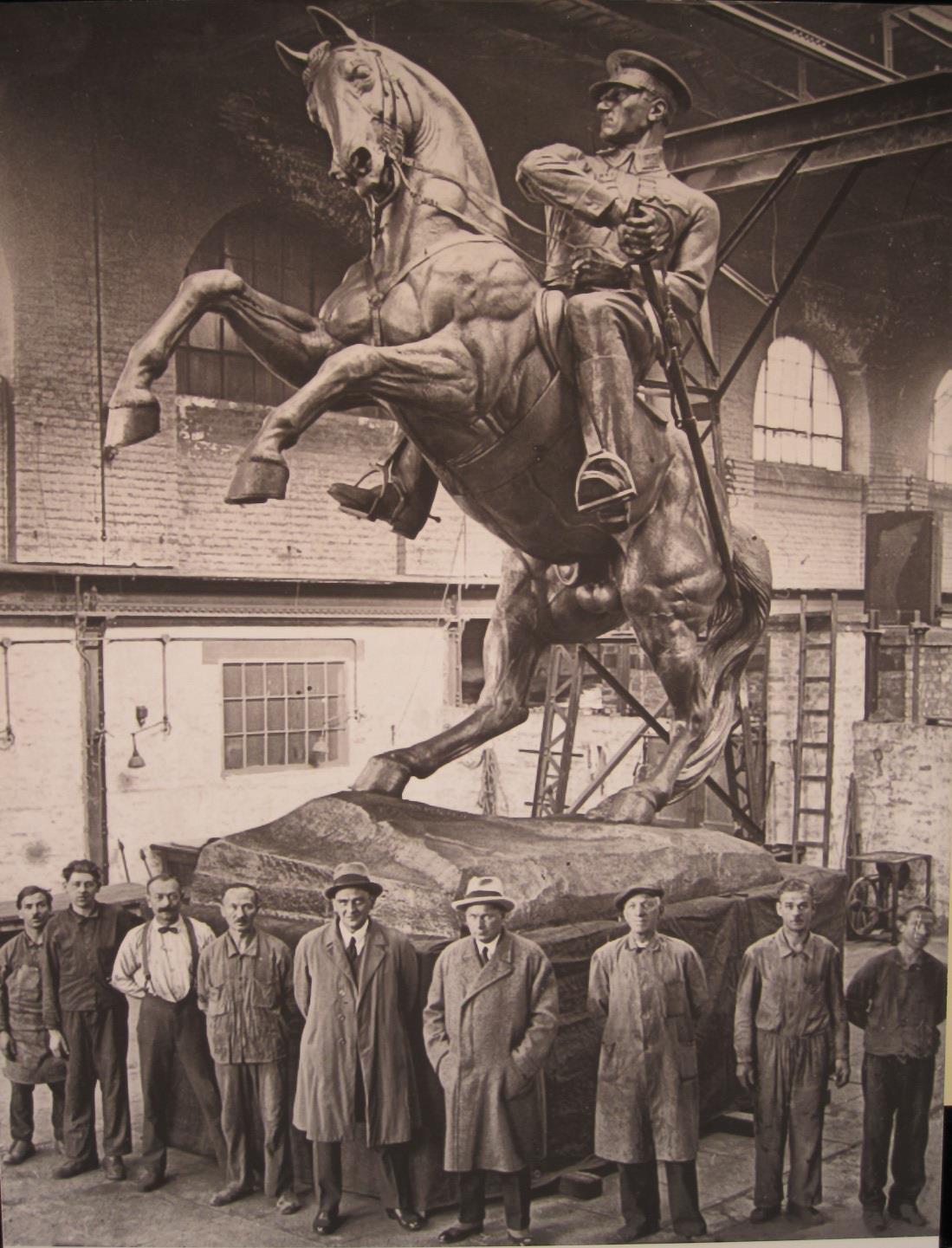
Heinrich Krippel's Atatürk Honor Monument after casting at Vereinigte Metallwerke in Austria.

The 32 pieces were transported in boxes from Hamburg, Germany to Turkey aboard SS Nicea of the Deutsche Levante-Linie arriving in Samsun on October 15, 1931.

== See also ==
- Atatürk monuments and memorials

== Bibliography ==
- Osma, Kıvanç (2003). Cumhuriyet Dönemi Anıt Heykelleri (1923–1946) (in Turkish). Ankara: Atatürk Araştırma Merkezi. ISBN 9751616786.
- Aslanapa, Oktay (1993). Türkiye'de Avusturyalı Sanat Tarihçileri ve Sanatkarlar (in Turkish). İstanbul: Eren Yayıncılık.
