= Kenan Yontunç =

Turkish sculptor

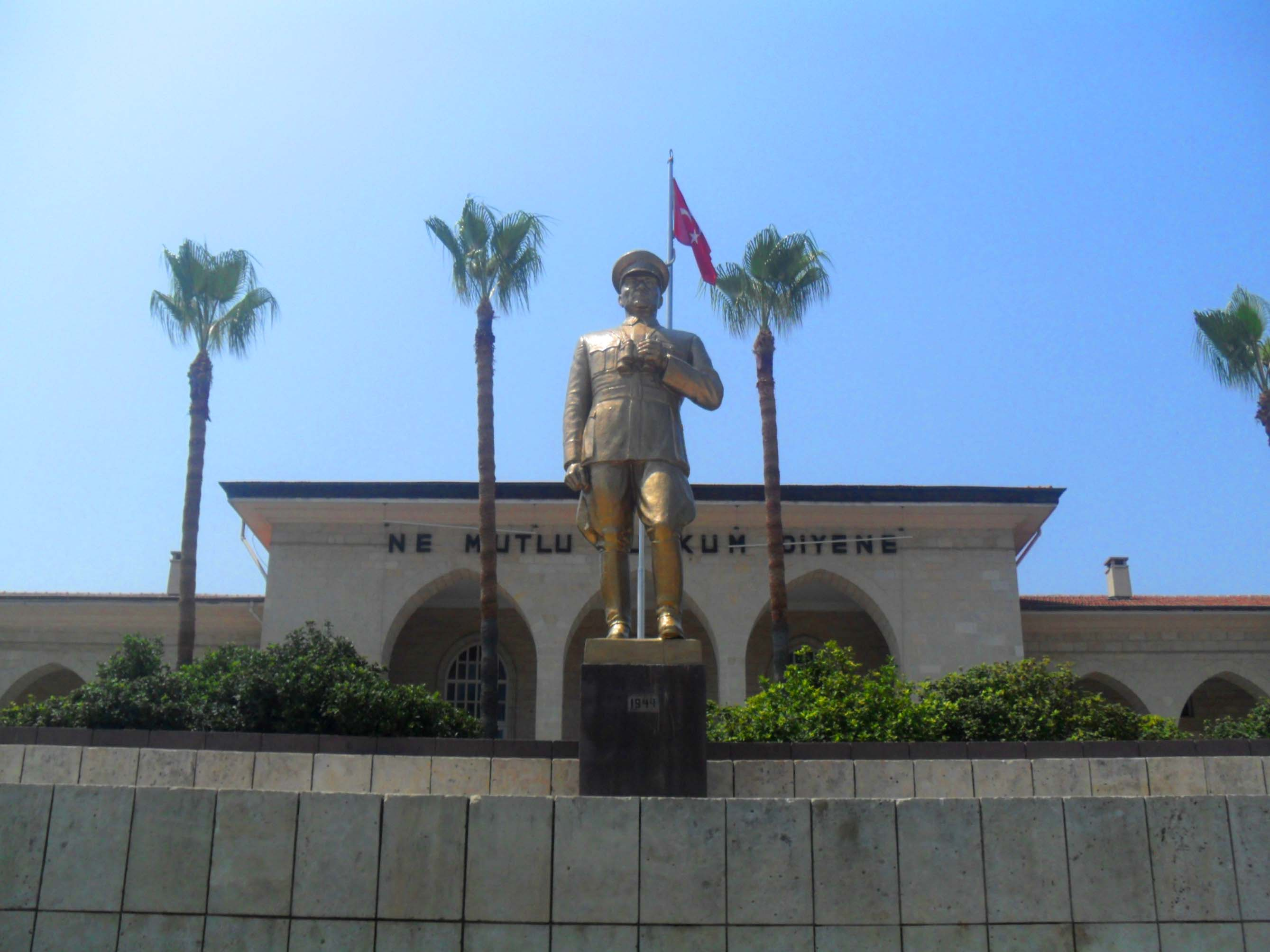
- Atatürk Monument in Mersin. Kenan Yontunç.
- Born: 1904; Constantinople, Ottoman Empire
- Died: 1995 (aged 90–91); Istanbul, Turkey
- Education: Mimar Sinan University
- Known for: Sculpture
- Notable work: Mostly Atatürk sculptures
- Spouse: Feriha Sevüktekin

Kenan Yontunç (1904–1995) was a Turkish sculptor.

== Life ==
Ahmet Kenan Yontunç was born in Constantinople in 1904. He studied in the Sanayi'i Nefise Academy (later renamed Mimar Sinan University) and in 1923 travelled to Germany for further studies. He then returned to Istanbul and in 1930 he was appointed as an art teacher. In 1940 he was promoted to the rank of professor. When surname became compulsory in 1934 by the Surname Law, he chose the name Yontunç ("sculptor"). He was married to Feriha, the daughter of Kâzım Sevüktekin, a general of the Turkish War of Independence.

== Works ==
In 1927 he created his first bust, a bust of Atatürk, the founder of Turkish Republic. He continued to create other sculptures of Atatürk. He was specialized in Atatürk sculptures and busts, partially because he was an acquaintance of Atatürk. In many Turkish cities such as Amasya, Tekirdağ, Kırklareli, Çorum, Edirne, Silifke, Elazığ, Isparta, Kastamonu, Mersin, Kayseri and Tarsus the Atatürk monuments in the main meeting squares of the city have been created by Yontunç. One of his most notable busts is Atatürk's mask created just after the death of Atatürk in 1938. This mask became very popular and copies of it were sold nationwide.

In the 1940s, he also created a number of sculptures of İsmet İnönü the second president of Turkey. In 1950s during the construction of Anıtkabir, he created both the reliefs and the dais.

== Trivia ==
Fashion designer, Eda Taşpınar is Kenan Yontunç's grand-granddaughter.
