= Statue of Atatürk (Gülhane Park) =

Sculpture in Istanbul, Turkey

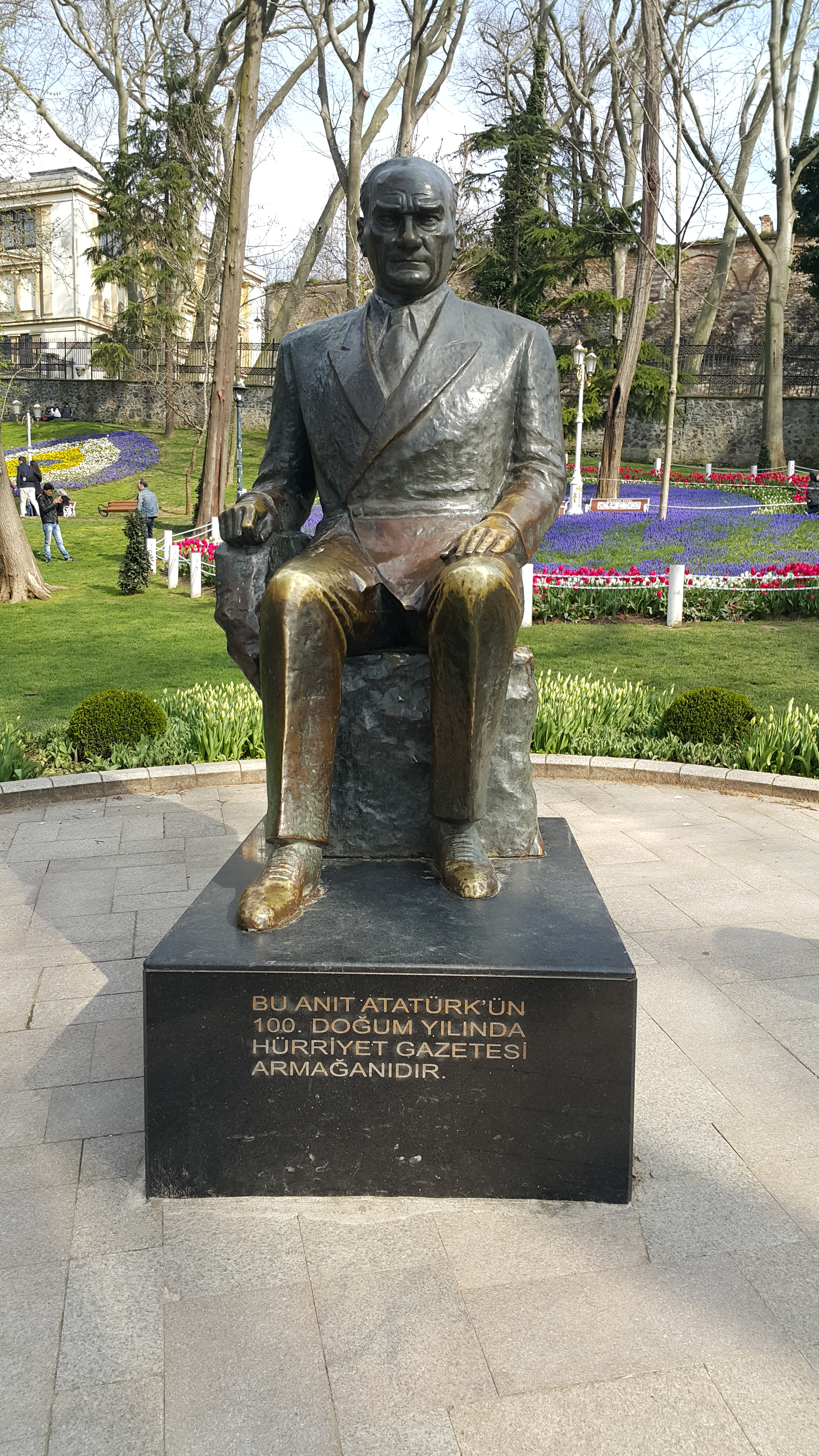
- The statue in Gülhane Park, 2015
- Subject: Mustafa Kemal Atatürk
- Location: Istanbul, Turkey

A statue of Mustafa Kemal Atatürk is installed in Istanbul's Gülhane Park, in Turkey.

== See also ==
- List of public art in Istanbul
- Statue of Atatürk (Sarayburnu)
