= Embassy of Turkey, Washington, D.C. =

Diplomatic mission of the Republic of Turkey to the United States

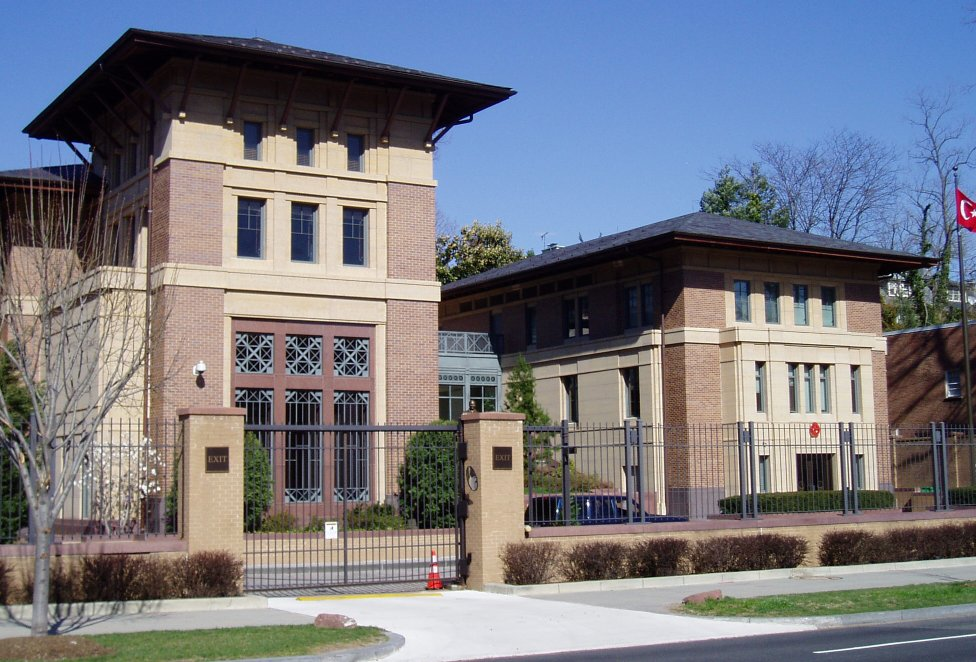
- Location: Washington, D.C.
- Address: 2525 Massachusetts Avenue, N.W.
- Coordinates: 38°54′59.3″N 77°03′21.45″W
- Ambassador: Sedat Önal
- Website: washington.emb.mfa.gov.tr

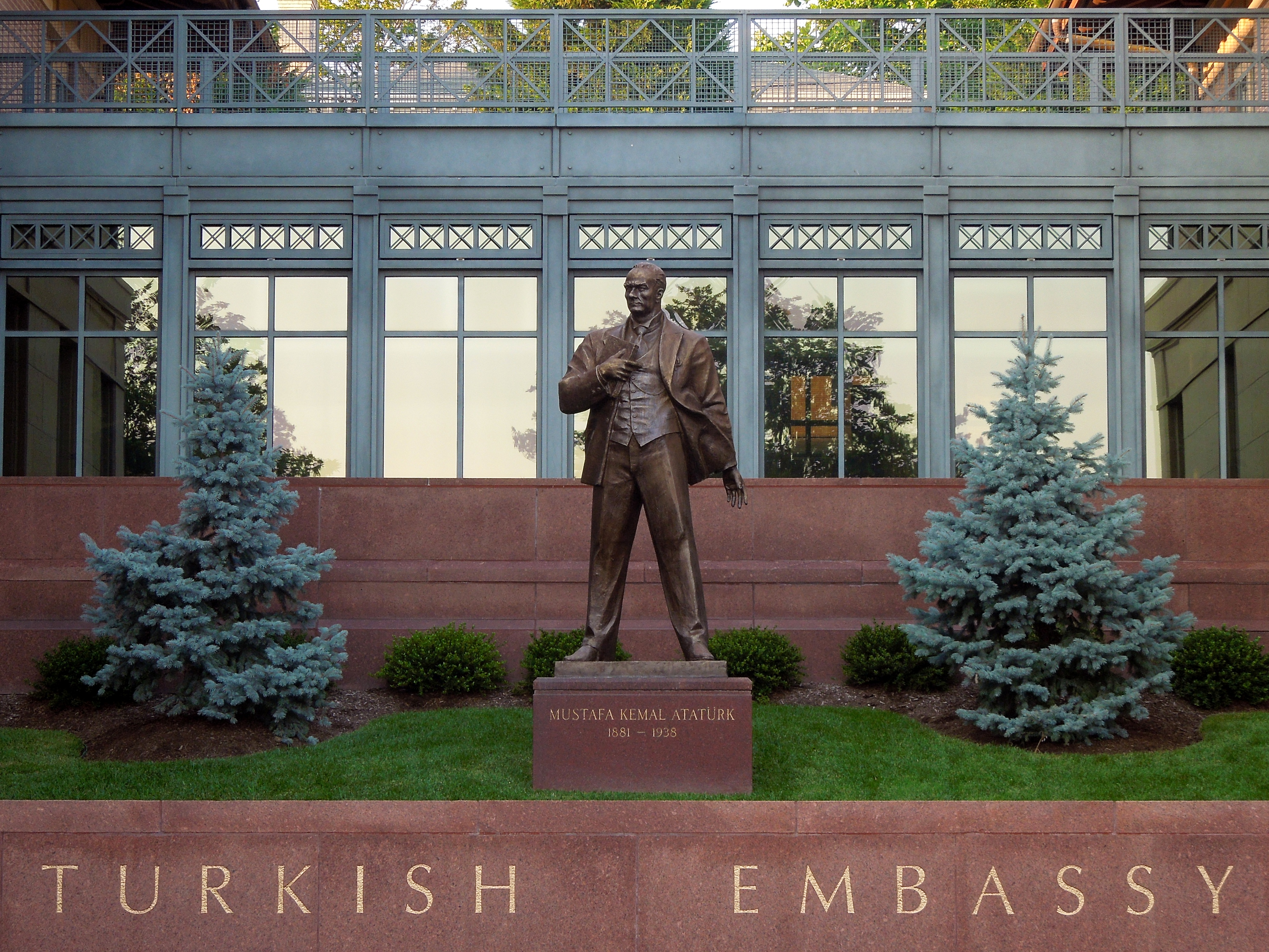
The statue of Mustafa Kemal Atatürk in Turkish Embassy, Washington D.C.

The Embassy of Turkey in Washington, D.C. is the diplomatic mission of the Republic of Turkey to the United States. It is located at 2525 Massachusetts Avenue, Northwest in the Embassy Row neighborhood.

== History ==
Previously, the embassy had been housed in a mansion farther south, at Sheridan Circle and 23rd Street, N.W. The building today serves as the Turkish ambassador's residence. It was originally built for Edward Hamlin Everett, a bottling millionaire, in 1915. The Everett House was designed by George Oakley Totten Jr., a Washingtonian who had spent a brief period in Turkey as the official architect for Ottoman Sultan Abdul Hamid II. The Turkish government leased the building in 1932 and purchased it four years later.

In the 1930s and 1940s, the embassy held numerous parties and musical sessions for famous jazz artists, such as Duke Ellington's band, organized by Ahmet and Nesuhi, the sons of then-ambassador Munir Ertegun and later the founders of Atlantic Records. Notably, these sessions were not racially segregated, with both black and white musicians being invited, and the Ertegun brothers also managed D.C.'s first integrated public concert in 1942.

In the 1980s, planning began to replace the chancery due to size concerns, with a new design that utilized Turkish vernacular architecture being proposed. However, there was considerable local opposition due to the historic status of the old building and concerns it would not fit in with the rest of the Sheridan-Kalorama neighborhood. The first design was rejected by zoning authorities, so Turkey commissioned Shalom Baranes Associates for a new plan that had a smaller footprint and fit in better. Reportedly, local approval was gained in January 1991 during the first night of the Gulf War air campaign, where Turkey used its support of coalition forces as leverage. The new chancery was inaugurated by Turkish President Süleyman Demirel on April 23, 1999.

=== 2017 violent clashes ===
On May 16, 2017, armed Turkish security forces attacked pro-PKK protesters demonstrating on behalf of the North American Kurdish Alliance outside the ambassador's residence during a visit by President Recep Tayyip Erdoğan, forcing intervention by the Metropolitan Police Department of the District of Columbia. On March 31, 2016, Turkish security forces had attacked protesters and journalists further down Embassy Row during a speech by President Erdoğan at the Brookings Institution.

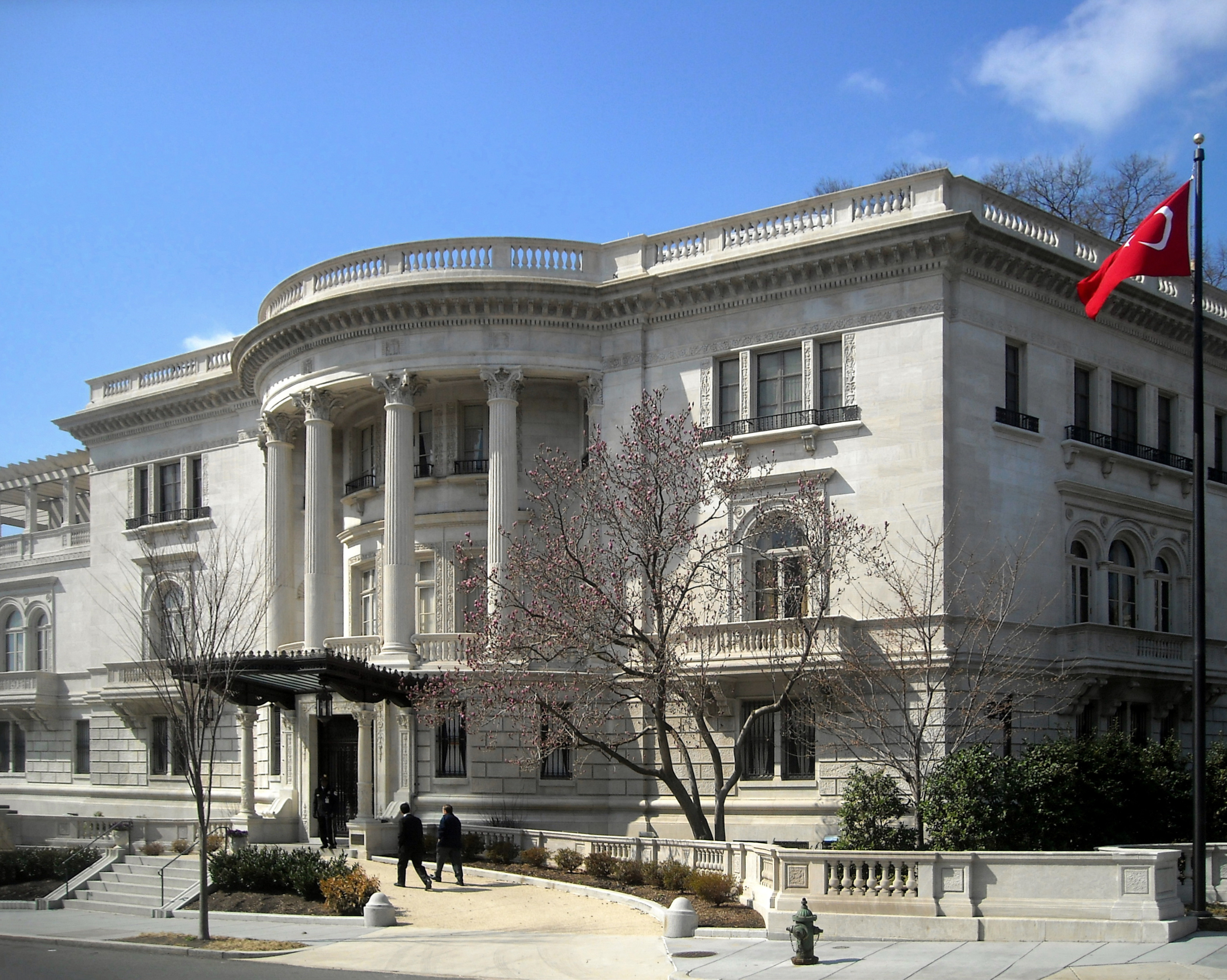
Turkish ambassador's residence in Washington, D.C.

== See also ==
- Turkey–United States relations
- Ambassadors of Turkey to the United States
- Ambassadors of the United States to Turkey
- Diplomatic missions of Turkey
