= Statue of Atatürk (Sarayburnu) =

Statue of Atatürk in Istanbul, Turkey

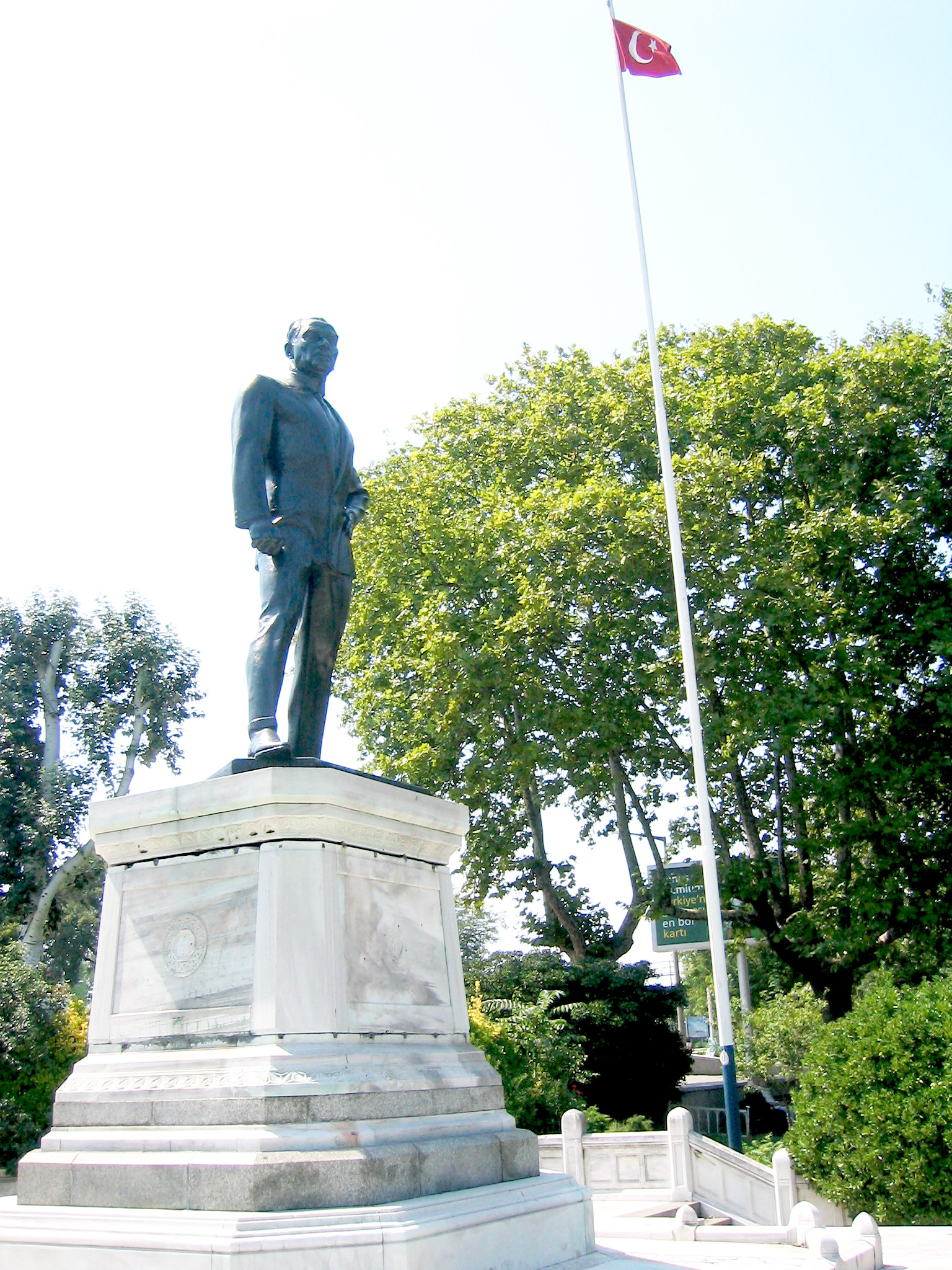
- Statue of Atatürk at Sarayburnu (Seraglio Point), Istanbul
- Interactive map of Statue of Atatürk (Sarayburnu)
- Location: Istanbul, Turkey
- Coordinates: 41.01544°N 28.98510°E
- Designer: Heinrich Krippel (1883–1945)
- Type: Statue
- Material: Bronze
- Beginning date: 25 August 1925
- Opening date: 3 October 1926; 99 years ago
- Dedicated to: Mustafa Kemal Atatürk

The Statue of Atatürk at Sarayburnu (Turkish: Sarayburnu Atatürk Heykeli) is a monument of Mustafa Kemal Atatürk, the founder of the Republic of Turkey, located at Sarayburnu (Seraglio Point) in Istanbul, Turkey. It was commissioned by the Mayor of Istanbul Emin Erkul, created by the Austrian sculptor Heinrich Krippel (1883–1945) and opened on 3 October 1926. It was the first monument of Atatürk in Turkey.

== Background ==
The art of sculpture was considered a sin in the Islamic faith during the Ottoman era. Its entering into social life in Turkey without any obstacles was only possible after the Turkish War of Independence (1919–1922). Following the victory of the final battle in the War of Independence, the Battle of Dumlupınar (26–30 August 1922), known as Field Battle of the Commander-in-Chief, a campaign was launched to honor the commander Ghazi Mustafa Kemal Pasha with an equestrian statue at Ulus Square before the parliament building in Ankara. Subsequently, a parliamentary commission was formed consisting of Hamdullah Suphi Tanrıöver, Fuat Umay, Ali Rıza Bebe and Eyüp Sabri Akgöl led by Yunus Nadi Abalıoğlu to build monuments and make paintings. In his speech, Mustafa Kemal Pasha held in Bursa on 22 January 1923, emphasized that building monuments and statues would not contradict the religion of Islam. Following the proclamation of the Republic of Turkey on 29 October 1923, Work has been initiated in almost every city in Turkey to build monuments, busts and statues of Atatürk.

Istanbul acted more quickly than other cities in these initiatives. One of the main reasons for this could be the desire to re-strengthen the bond between Ghazi Mustafa Kemal Pasha and Istanbul as the capital of the Ottoman Empire that had weakened during the years of the War of Independence. After the victory, Istanbul, which wanted to preserve its former influence and status as the capital city, sought ways to strengthen its relations with the leader of the national struggle. However, the statements made by Gazi Mustafa Kemal Pasha in İzmit on 16 January 1923 gave the first signs that, contrary to what was thought, Istanbul would not be made the center of government as it was in the past. On 28 February 1923, Ghazi Mustafa Kemal Pasha was granted honorary citizenship of Istanbul by the "Cemiyet-i Umûmiye-i Belediye" (Association of Municipalities), thus demonstrating the love and loyalty of the people of Istanbul to him. However, this kind gesture was not enough for Istanbul to retain its status as the capital, as of 13 October 1923, the new administrative center of the state became Ankara. On the other hand, although Ghazi Mustafa Kemal Pasha was invited to Istanbul for various reasons starting in 1923, he did not visit the city until 1 July 1927. While this issue occupied the public agenda for four years, the city administrators claimed that this was a mere coincidence.

Another reason that accelerated the construction of the Atatürk statue in Istanbul was the perspective of the then the Mayor of Istanbul Emin Erkul on the art of sculpture. Before his duty as the Mayor of Istanbul, Emin Erkul, a former military surgeon, served in the National struggle period (1918–1920) and in the parliament as a deputy (1920–1923). He considered the development of sculpture to be a part of civilization and in his statements to newspapers he expressed his desire to build statues he had encountered in the European cities he had previously traveled to. When all these were combined with the importance that the Republic administration and especially Atatürk gave to the fine arts within the framework of their modernization goals, the Istanbul Municipality accelerated its work to become the first city, where a statue of Gazi Mustafa Kemal Pasha was erected.

== Building of the statue ==
In this context, it was decided to build an Atatürk statue at Sarayburnu (Seraglio Point). A commission was established within the municipality to carry out the construction work. The mayor asked for the permission of the Pasha in a meeting in Ankara. In the beginning, the Pasha was not satisfied with the place as Sarayburnu. He accepted the place when Emin Erkul told that the back of the statue will be facing Topkapi Palace, the long-time seat of the Ottoman sultans. This will symbolize that the Ottoman sultanate has become history.

As the sculptor, Austrian Heinrich Krippel (1883–1945) was chosen, whom the mayor has met in Hungary during a sewage project investigation of the municipality. Krippel went to Istanbul on 7 June 1925. He then travelled to Ankara on 9 June to see Ghazi Mustafa Kemal Pasha in Çankaya Mansion personally, and to take the poses necessary for the production of the sculpture. Having completed his work in Ankara, Krippel decided to go back to Istanbul with the samples of the models he had made, and exhibit his work at the Galata Central Dock on 18-19 July 1925. On this occasion, he announced that the Sarayburnu statue would depict Ghazi Mustafa Kemal Pasha in civilian clothes. Krippel travelled to Vienna, Austria, towards the end of July 1925 to build the statue. The foundation laying ceremony for the statue was held by the Istanbul Municipalityattended by high officials and politicians on 25 August 1925. To be used as an inscription of the statue, a document with following text was signed by the attendees: "In the name of the greatest Ghazi, who saved the homeland from collapse and the Turks from misery and humiliation, the official dedication of this monument was made in the name of his excellency, Ghazi Mustafa Kemal Pasha. Tuesday, 25 August AH 1341 (1925) 10:00". It was put in a contain while he was in r and placed in the foundation. The ceremony was telegraphed to the Ghazi, who thanked the next day while in İnebolu for the introduction of the reform of headgear change.

Krippel visited the site several times in about 14 months to examine the statue base, which was constructed by a stonemason of the municipality. The bronze statue, completed in Vienna, was brought to Istanbul. After its erecting, the monument was inaugurated with a ceremony attended by high officials and politicians along with nearly five hundred citizens on 3 October 2026. The statue base had inscriptions on four sides written in Ottoman Turkish alphabet by calligrapher Kâmil Akdik (1861–1941): AH 1336 Tarih-i İstihlas (1920 Liberation), AH 1342 Heykel’in Tarih-i Rekzi (1926 Opening Date of the Statue), AH 1338 Muzafferiyet-i Kat’iye (1922 Definitive Victory) and AH 1339 Cumhuriyet’in İlânı (1923 Proclamation of the Republic). In addition, there were bronze medallions on the base of the statue, which was surrounded by a marble platform inlaid with bronze on all four sides. The inauguration was telegraphed to the Ghazi, who thanked to the citizen of Istanbul on 6 October 1926, on the third anniversary of the Liberation of Istanbul from the Allied troops. The cost was given to one source as ₺15,000, and to another source as ₺45,230.

== See also ==
- List of public art in Istanbul
- Statue of Atatürk (Gülhane Park)
