= Statue of Atatürk (Turkish Embassy, Washington) =

Statue in Washington, D.C., U.S.

Mustafa Kemal Atatürk
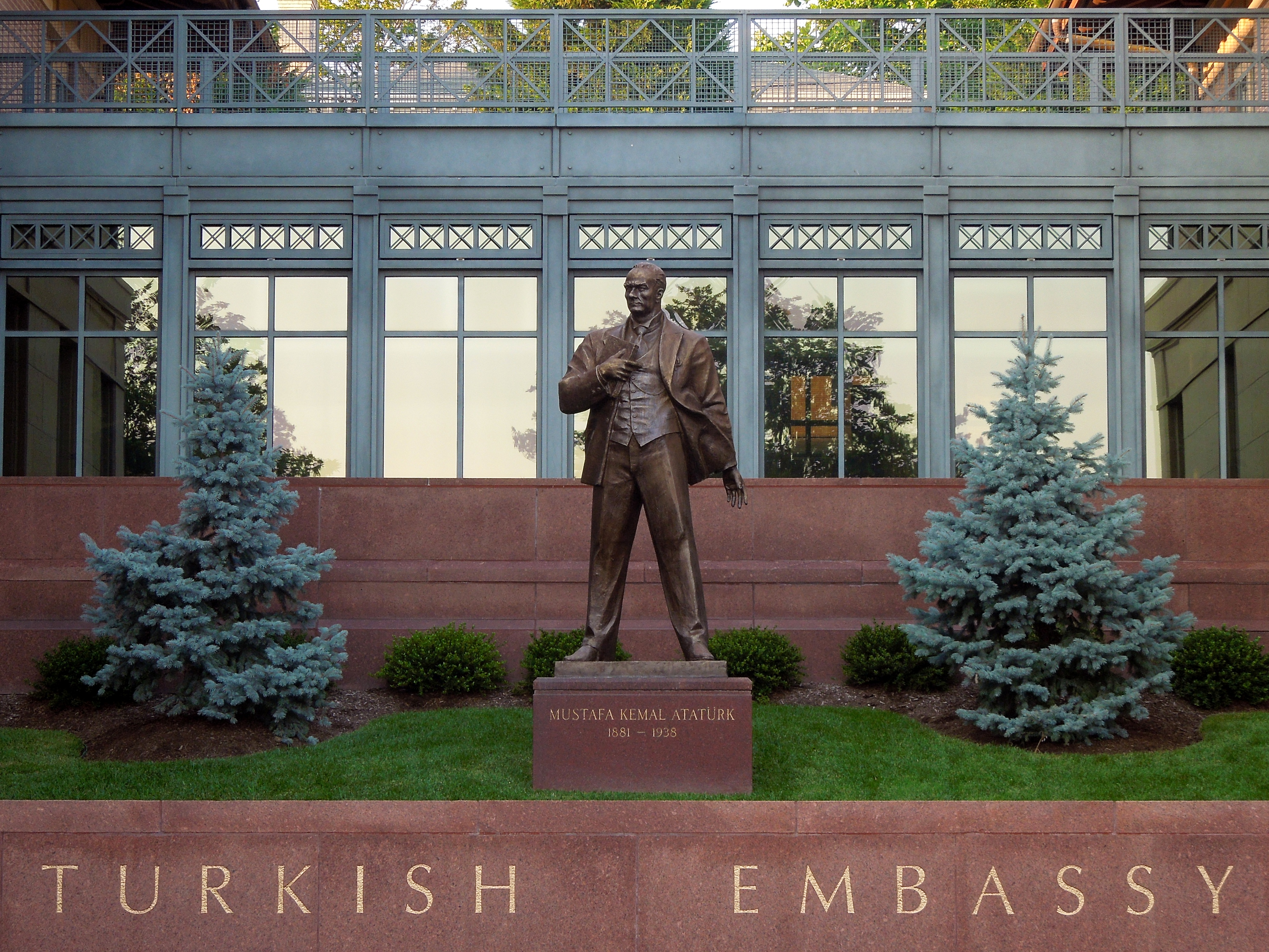
- The sculpture outside the Embassy of Turkey, Washington, D.C. in 2012
- Type: Sculpture
- Subject: Mustafa Kemal Atatürk
- Location: Washington, D.C., United States; 38°54′59.3″N 77°03′21.45″W

Mustafa Kemal Atatürk is an outdoor sculpture of Mustafa Kemal Atatürk, installed outside the Embassy of Turkey, Washington, D.C. (1625 Massachusetts Avenue), in the United States. It is one of two statues in Embassy Row depicting Kemal Atatürk; the other was installed outside the Turkish Ambassador's Residence (1606 23rd Street NW), on the periphery of Sheridan Circle, in 2013.
