= Atatürk Monument (Mersin) =

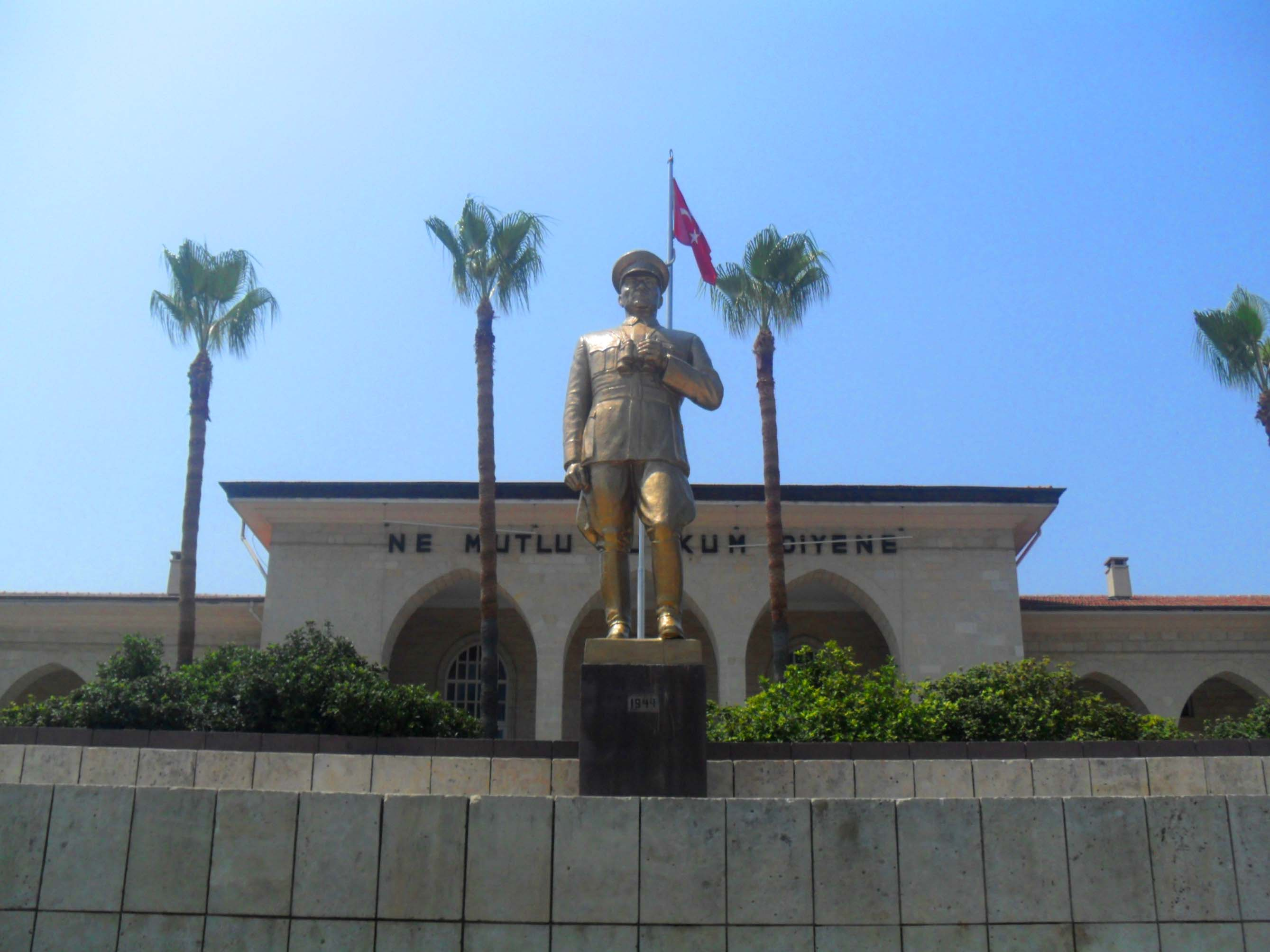
- Monument; Halkevi in the background
- Interactive map of Atatürk Monument
- Location: Mersin, Turkey
- Coordinates: 36°47′37″N 34°37′32″E
- Designer: Kenan Yontuç
- Type: Statue
- Material: Bronze
- Opening date: 1944

Atatürk Monument is a statue depicting Mustafa Kemal Atatürk, the founder of the Republic of Turkey, in Mersin, Turkey.

== Geography ==
The monument is situated in the Cumhuriyet Square (Republic square) in Mersin at 36°47′37″N 34°37′31″E. Mersin Halkevi is to the northwest and İsmet İnönü Boulevard is to the southeast of the square. Up to the 1960s, the Mediterranean Sea coast was just to the south, but after the construction of Mersin Harbor now the distance to seaside is about 250 metres (820 ft).

== History ==
Tevfik Sırrı Gür, the governor of Mersin Province in office between 1943 and 1947, was instrumental in building the monument. It was erected in 1944 on 23 April, the 24th anniversary of the foundation of Turkish parliament. Its creator was Turkish sculpture professor Kenan Yontunç, who had created a number of Atatürk statues before.

== Technical details ==
The monument is a composed of a marble dais and a bronze statue of Atatürk, the founder of modern Turkey in military uniform. The height of the statue is 3.3 metres (11 ft). The dais is a raised platform which is situated in front of the statue.
