= Atatürk and Şerife Bacı Monument =

- Atatürk ve Şerife Bacı Anıtı
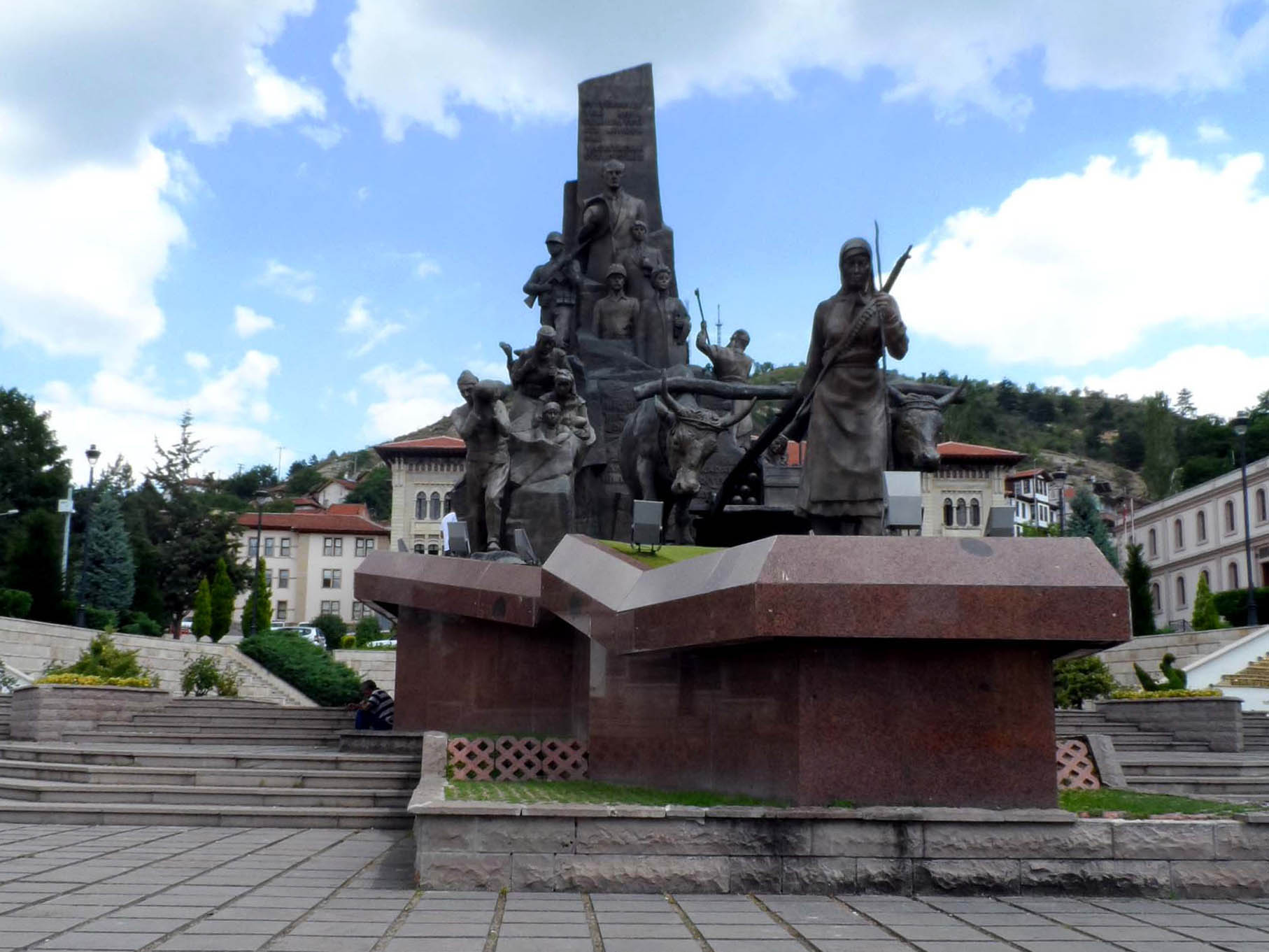
- Monument; Kastamonu Governor’s Building in the background
- Interactive map of Atatürk and Şerife Bacı Monument
- Location: Kastamonu, Turkey
- Coordinates: 41°22′35″N 33°46′38″E
- Designer: Tankut Öktem
- Type: Group of Statues
- Opening date: 1990

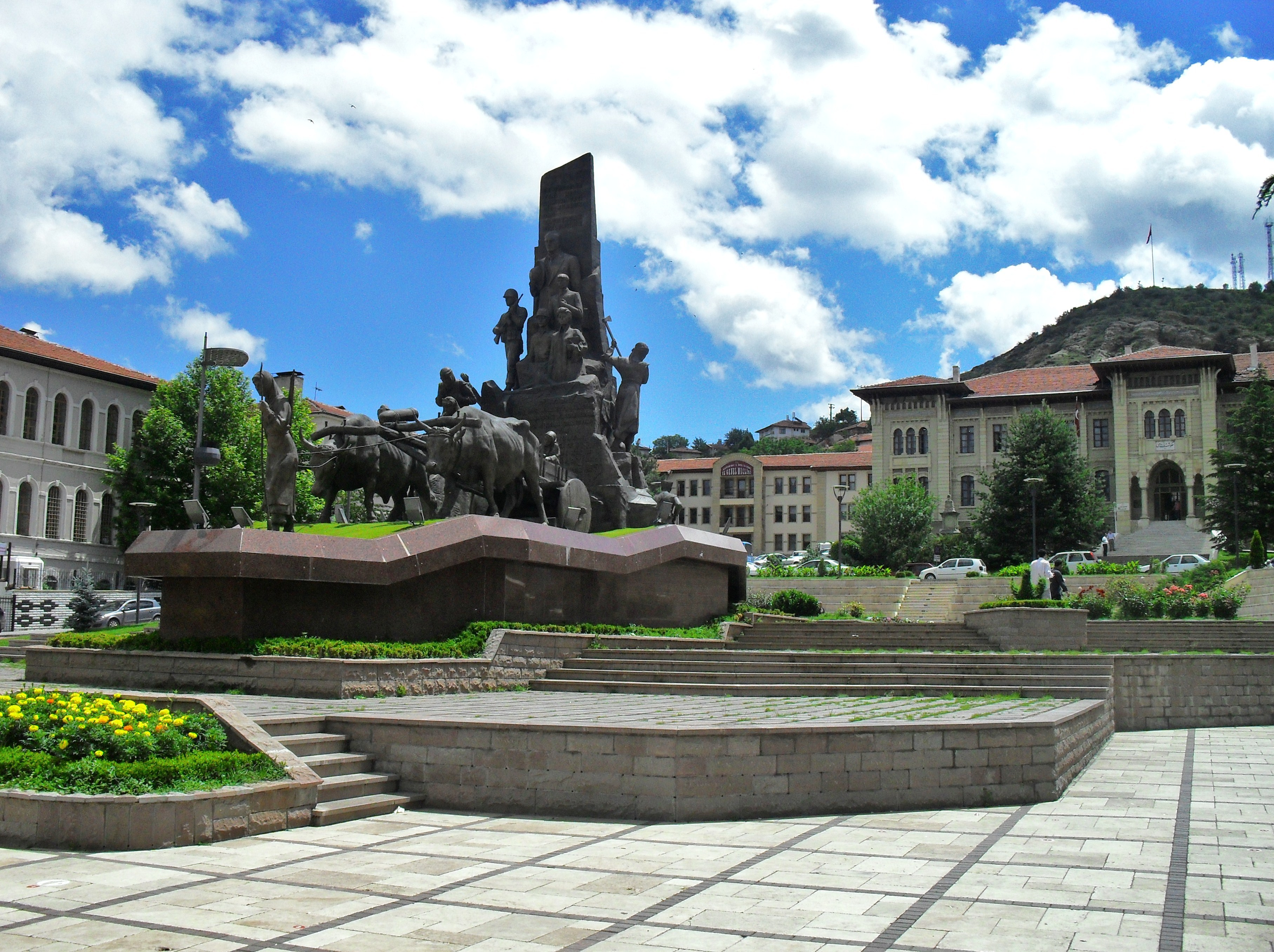
Atatürk and Şerife Bacı Monument in Kastamonu depicting armed Şerife Bacı (front left) driving an ox cart and standing Mustafa Kemal Atatürk (back middle) flanked by soldiers in the Turkish War of Independence.

Atatürk and Şerife Bacı Monument is a monument in Kastamonu, Turkey.

== Geography ==
The monument is in the Cumhuriyet square in front of Kastamonu Governor's Office at 41°22′35″N 33°46′40″E.

== Atatürk and Şerife Bacı ==
Atatürk (1881–1938) was the founder of the Turkish Republic. He was also the high commander of the Turkish army in the Turkish War of Independence (1919–1923).

Şerife Bacı (literally Sister Şerife) (1900–1921) was a heroine in the Turkish War of Independence. She was a village woman from Seydiler, who took part in the arms transportation service. Any weapon or ammunition from Istanbul to İnebolu port (Kastamonu Province) had to be forwarded to Ankara by ox wagons (Turkish: kağnı). Since most of the men were drafted, women were responsible for transportation. In 1921 December Şerife with her new born baby volunteered to drive a wagon in the convoy. But she froze to death in the harsh winder conditions. Later it was revealed that she had laid her own coat over the ammunition. Her baby was rescued.

== The monument ==
In 1985 Kastamonu governor decided to erect a monument about Şerife Bacı. The monument was created by Professor Tankut Öktem (1940–2007) of the Marmara University in 1990. In 2005 the dais was renewed by using a basalt platform. The monument is actually a group of figures. These are Atatürk, Şerife Bacı, ox wagon and various soldiers.

== See also ==
- Atatürk monuments and memorials
