= Victory Monument (Ankara) =

Monument in Ankara, Turkey

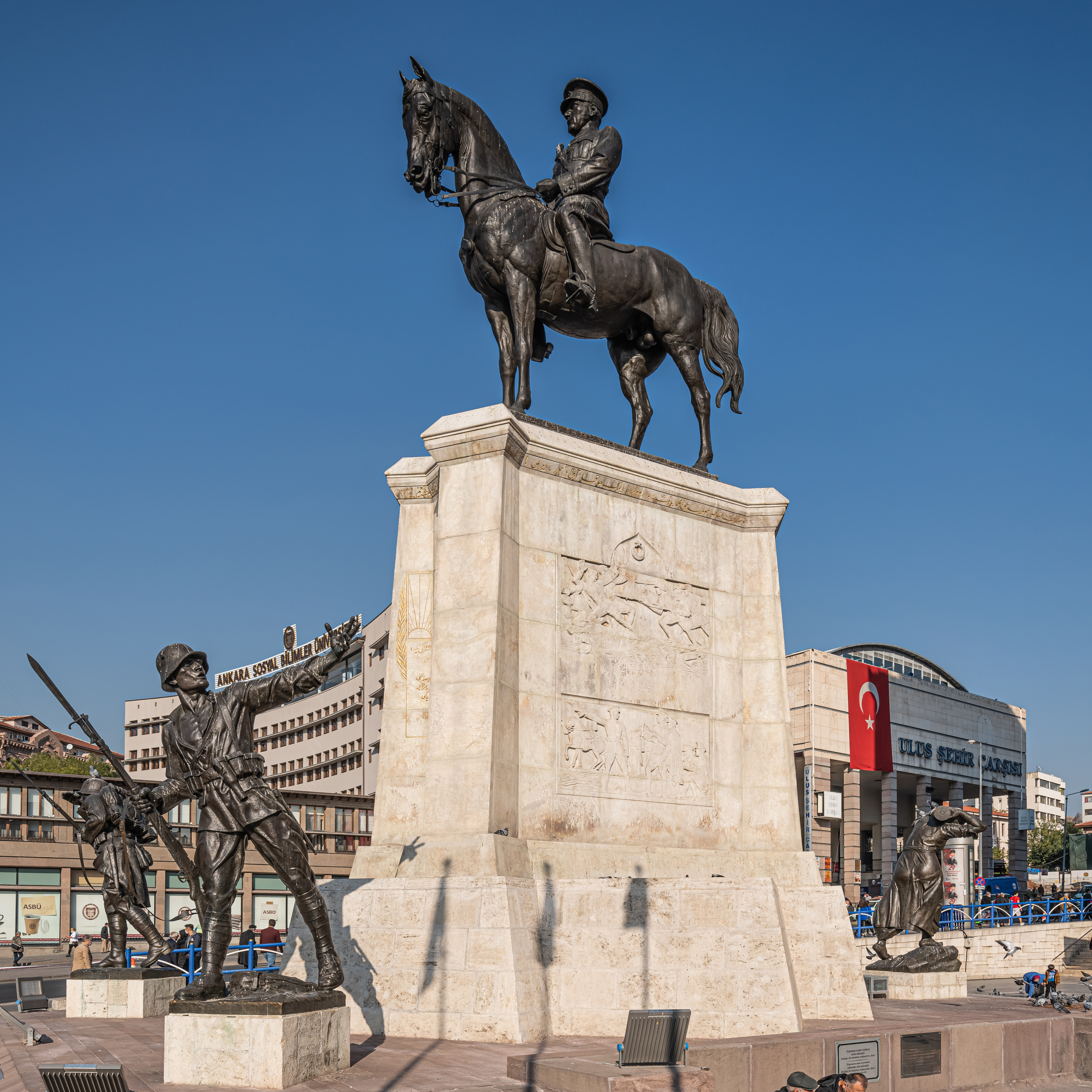
- Victory Monument with equestrian Mustafa Kemal Atatürk
- Interactive map of Victory Monument
- Location: Ankara, Turkey
- Coordinates: 39.9416°N 32.8548°E
- Designer: Henrich Krippel
- Type: Statue
- Material: Bronze
- Opening date: 1927

Victory Monument (Turkish: Zafer Anıtı, also known as Ulus Atatürk Anıtı) is a monument in Ankara, Turkey.

== Geography ==
The monument is in the Ulus Square which was the main square in Ankara before the 1950s. It is situated to the east of Atatürk Boulevard.

== History ==
The monument was a result of a nationwide fund drive organized by the journalist Yunus Nadi. After an international competition, the project of Heinrich Krippel from Austria was rewarded. The monument was inaugurated on 24 November 1927. It was restored in 2002.

== Technical details ==
The monument is actually a group of bronze statues. In addition to equestrian Atatürk in the center, there are three more figures; two soldiers and one woman. One soldier is calling his friend to the battlefront and the other one is observing the front. The woman is carrying a cannonball, as a reference to the contributions of the Turkish women during the Turkish War of Independence.

== See also ==
- Atatürk monuments and memorials
