= Heinrich Krippel =

Austrian artist

- Born: 27 September 1883; Vienna, Austria
- Died: 5 April 1945 (aged 61); Vienna, Austria
- Education: Academy of Fine Arts Vienna
- Known for: Statues of Mustafa Kemal Atatürk in Turkey

Heinrich Krippel (27 September 1883 – 5 April 1945) was an Austrian sculptor, painter, chalcographer and illustrator. He is best known for his creation of monumental statues of Mustafa Kemal Atatürk in Turkey.

He was educated at Academy of Fine Arts Vienna between 1904 and 1909.

== Notable works ==
- Atatürk Monument, Seraglio Point (Sarayburnu Atatürk Anıtı) (3 October 1926)
- Atatürk Monument, Konya (29 October 1926)
- Victory Monument, Ankara (Ankara Zafer Anıtı) (24 November 1927))
- Statue of Honor, Samsun (Onur Anıtı, Samsun) (15 January 1932)
- Monument of Great Triumph, Afyonkarahisar (Büyük Utku Anıtı) (24 March 1936)
- Monument of Sitting Atatürk, Ankara (Oturan Atatürk Anıtı) (1938)
