= METU Atatürk Monument =

- ODTÜ Atatürk Anıtı
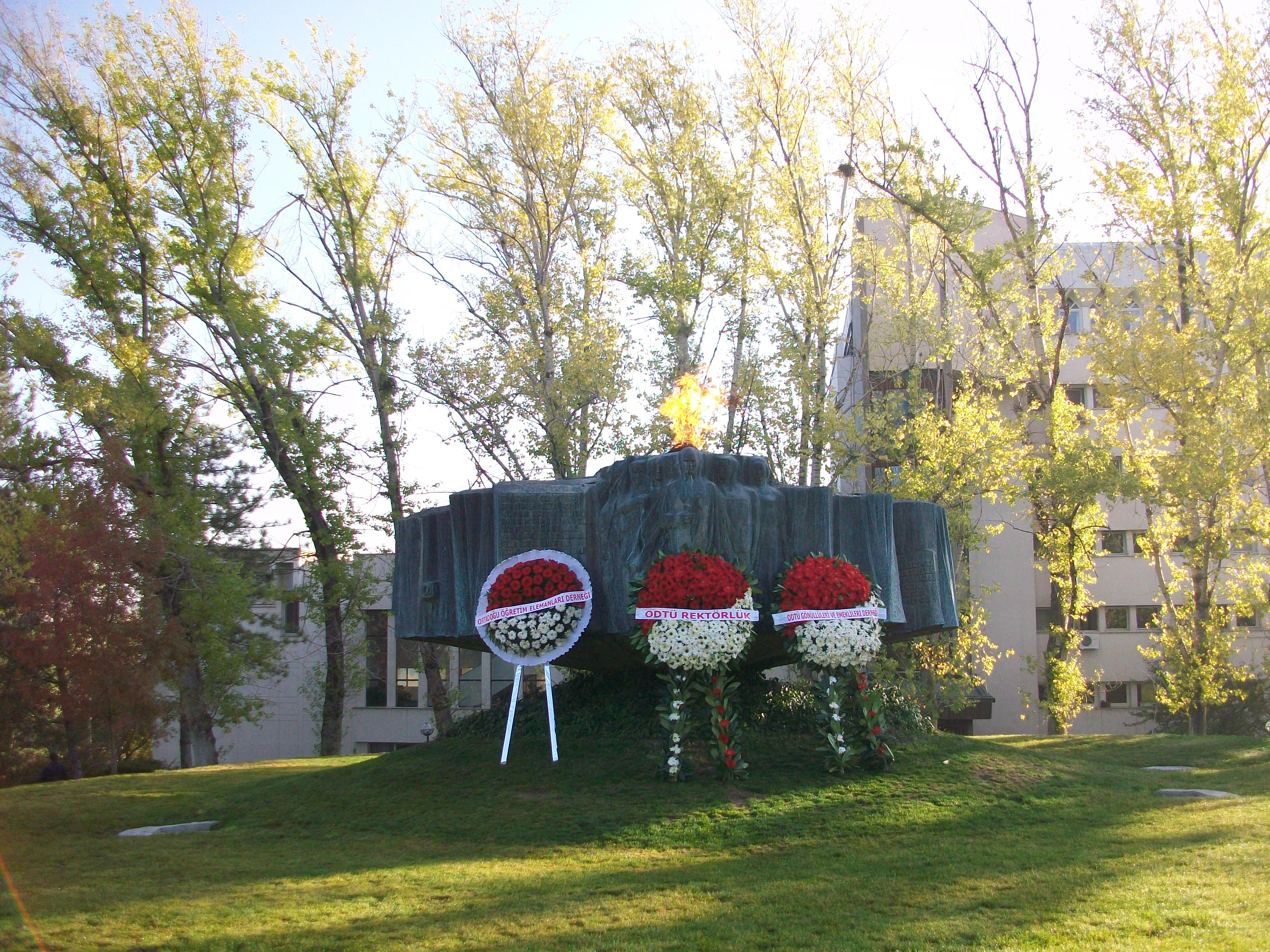
- November 10, the monument with wreaths in front of it.
- Interactive map of METU Atatürk Monument
- Location: Middle East Technical University
- Coordinates: 39°53′41.13″N 32°47′0.08″E
- Designer: Şadi Çalık
- Type: Sculpture
- Material: Bronze
- Opening date: 1966; 60 years ago
- Dedicated to: Mustafa Kemal Atatürk

The Atatürk Monument (Turkish: ODTÜ Atatürk Anıtı) is a monument in Turkey dedicated to Mustafa Kemal Atatürk, the founder of modern Turkey. It is situated on the Ankara Campus of the Faculty of Arts and Sciences at Middle East Technical University (METU). The monument's design was selected through a competition initiated in 1965, with Şadi Çalık’s submission securing first place. Completed in 1966, the bronze structure holds the distinction of being Turkey's first abstract monument dedicated to Atatürk.

Each November 10, on the anniversary of Atatürk's death, a commemoration is held by METU staff and students in front of the monument.
