= Harbiye, Şişli =

Harbiye
- Neighbourhood
- A map of neighbourhoods of Şişli

- Location in Turkey Harbiye (Istanbul)
- Coordinates: 41°02′43″N 28°59′27″E
- Country: Turkey
- Province: Istanbul
- District: Şişli
- Population (2022): 2,157
- Time zone: UTC+3 (TRT)
- Area code: 0212

Harbiye is a neighbourhood in the municipality and district of Şişli, Istanbul Province, Turkey. Its population is 2,157 (2022).

The neighbourhood takes its name from the Mekteb-i Harbiye (Ottoman War Academy) that functioned here for many years, albeit with intervals, in the 19th and 20th centuries.

Harbiye is separated from Kurtuluş to the west by busy Cumhuriyet Caddesi (Independence Street). To its north are the upmarket neighbourhoods of Nişantaşı and Teşvikiye, while to its east is leafy Maçka. To its south are the heavily built-up Elmadağ and Taksim neighbourhoods.

The nearest Metro station to Harbiye is Osmanbey on the M2 line but many buses and dolmuşes plough up and down Cumhuriyet Caddesi.

== Attractions ==
Harbiye's most important tourist attraction is the Military Museum (Askeri Müzesi), which is housed in the buildings of the old Mekteb-i Harbiye (Ottoman War Academy. It contains a fine collection of embroidered Ottoman war tents and paintings by the war artist Hasan Rıza Bey. It also preserves a classroom where Atatürk studied from 1899 to 1905. It is housed in a mid-19th-century building that replaces a slightly earlier one, lost to fire. It opened to the public in 1993.

The 19th-century French girls school, the Lycée Notre Dame de Sion Istanbul, stands on the western side of Cumhuriyet Caddesi. Inside the grounds are the Church of St Espirit, designed by Giuseppe Fossati in 1846 and a statue of Pope Benedict XV.

The Hilton Istanbul Bosphorus, Turkey's first five-star hotel, designed in 1955 by Sedad Hakki Eldem, is on the eastern side of Cumhuriyet Caddesi, surrounded by extensive grounds, a precious commodity in such a built-up part of town. The Istanbul Radio House is on the eastern side of the road on the site of a lost Armenian cemetery.

The Architecture Department of the Istanbul Technical University (İstanbul Teknik Üniversitesi) is housed in what was originally the Taskısla (Stone Barracks) building designed by British architect William James Smith between 1846 and 1852

There are a number of cultural institutions in Harbiye including the Harbiye Muhsin Ertuğrul Stage, the Cemal Reşit Rey Concert Hall, the Istanbul Congress Center and the Cemil Topuzlu Open-Air Theatre.

Most of Macka Park a large and very popular inner-city green space where concerts and festivals are held in summer, lies within the Harbiye area.

== Gallery ==
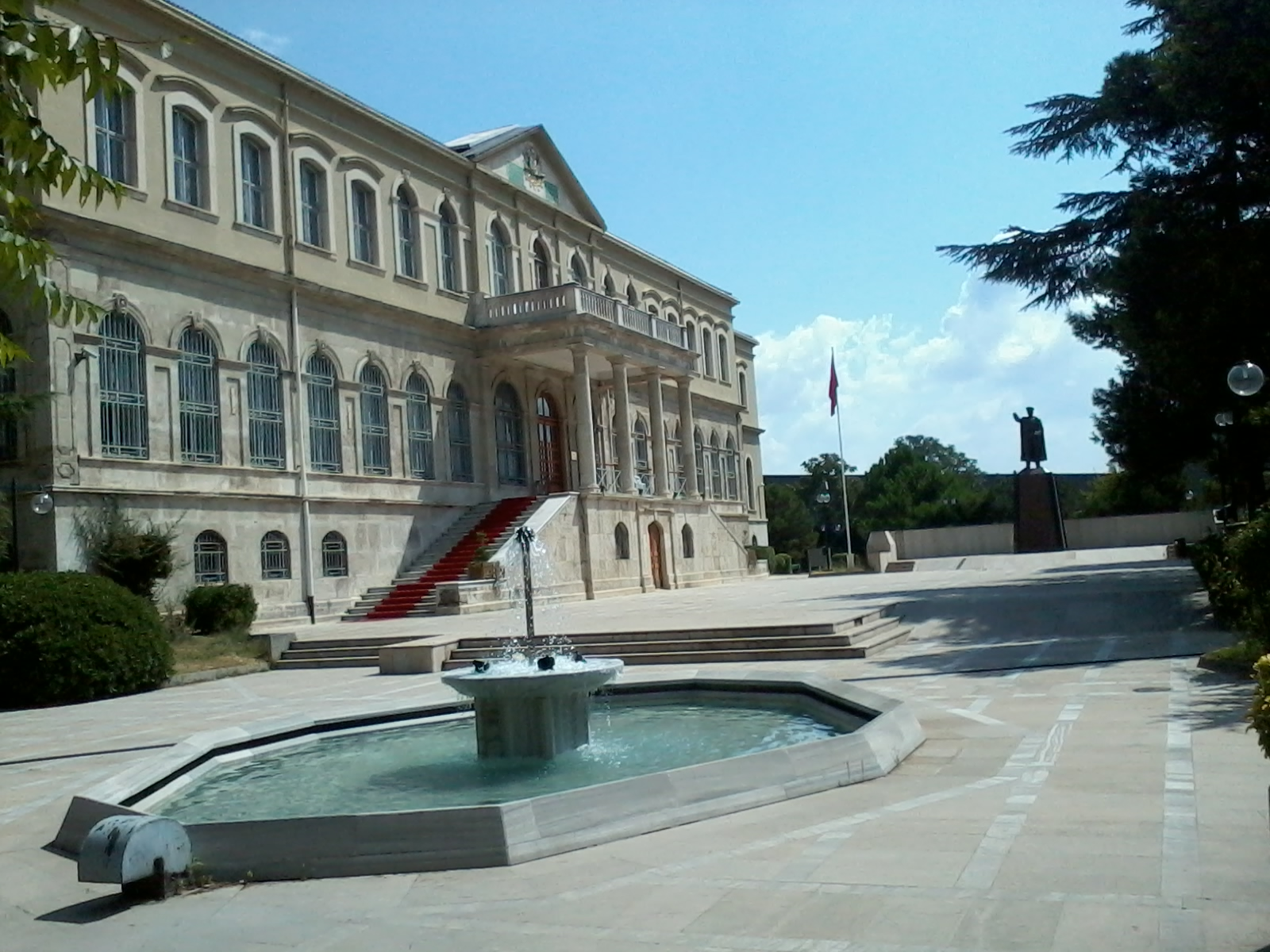
Maçka Kışlası (Barracks), now part of Istanbul Technical University

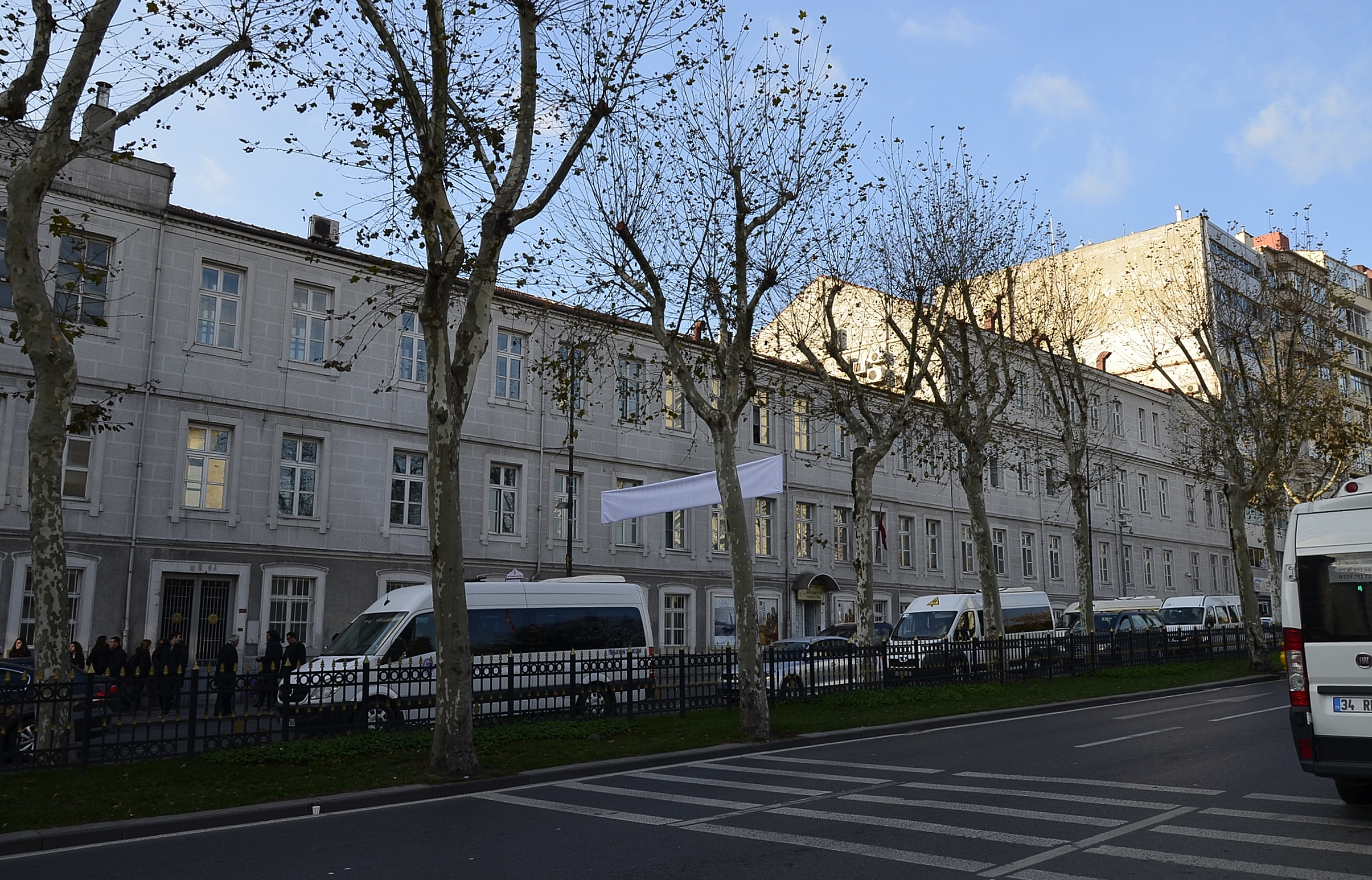
Lycée Notre Dame de Sion Istanbul

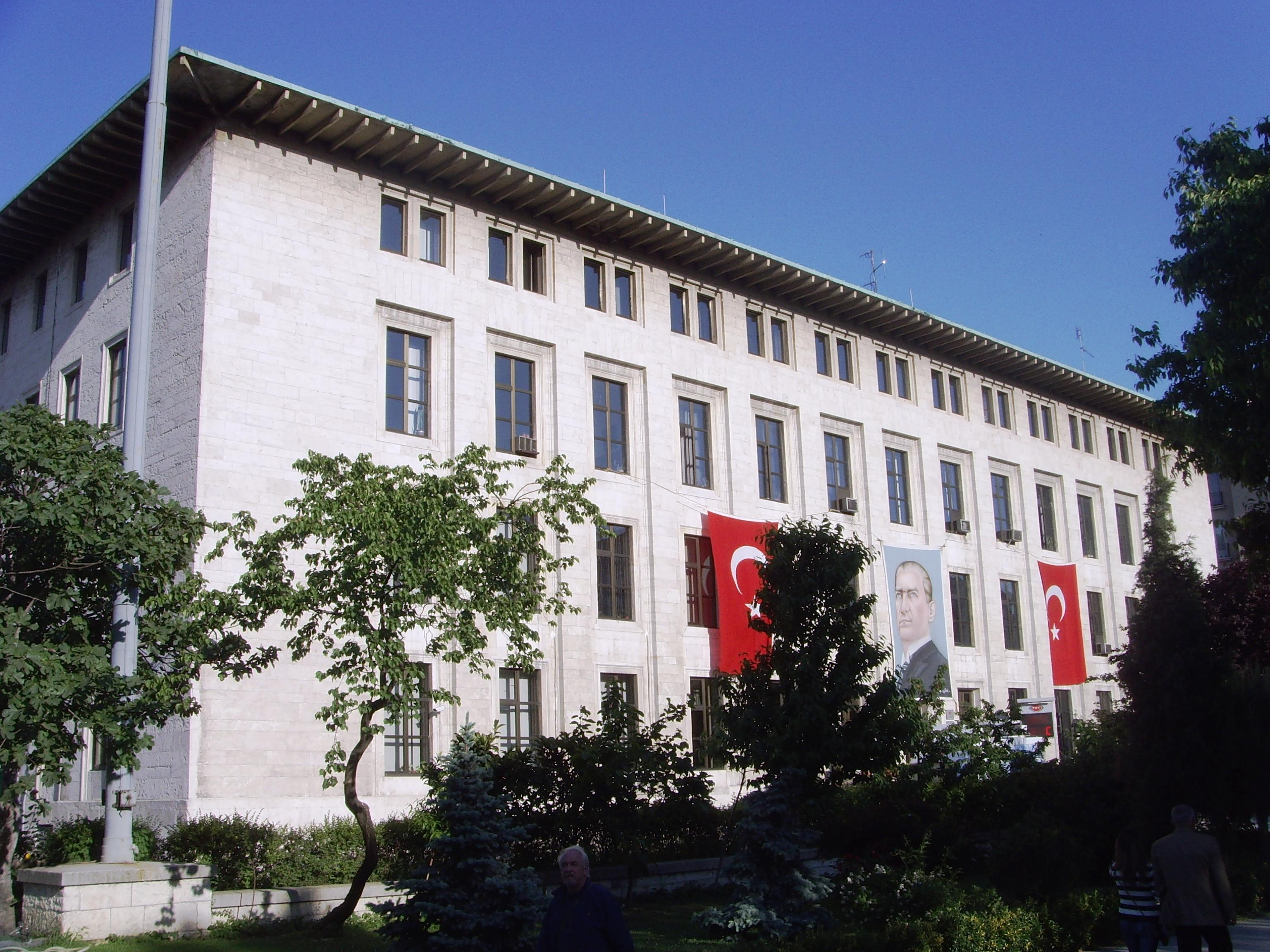
Istanbul Radio House

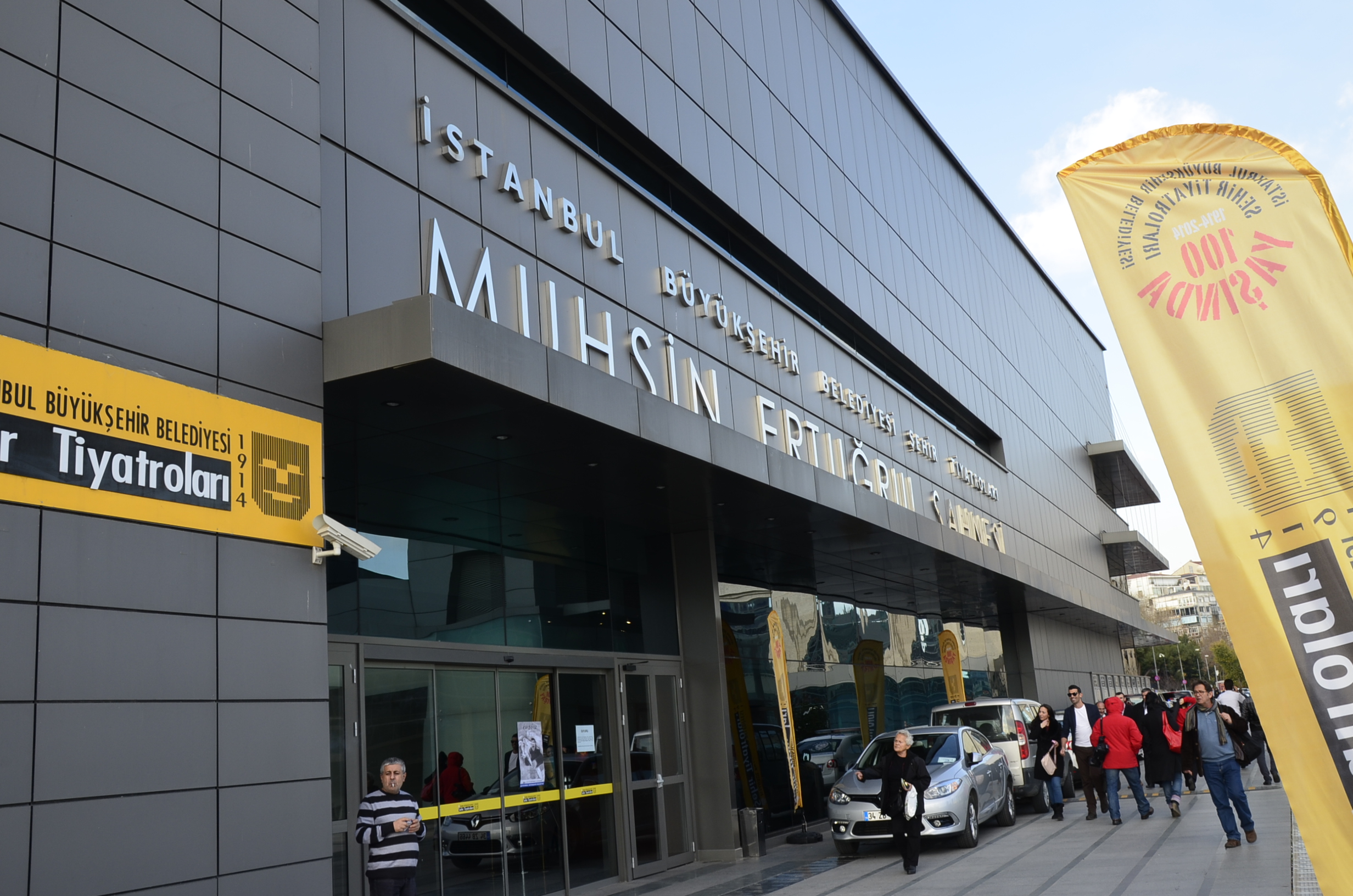
Harbiye Muhsin Ertuğrul Stage

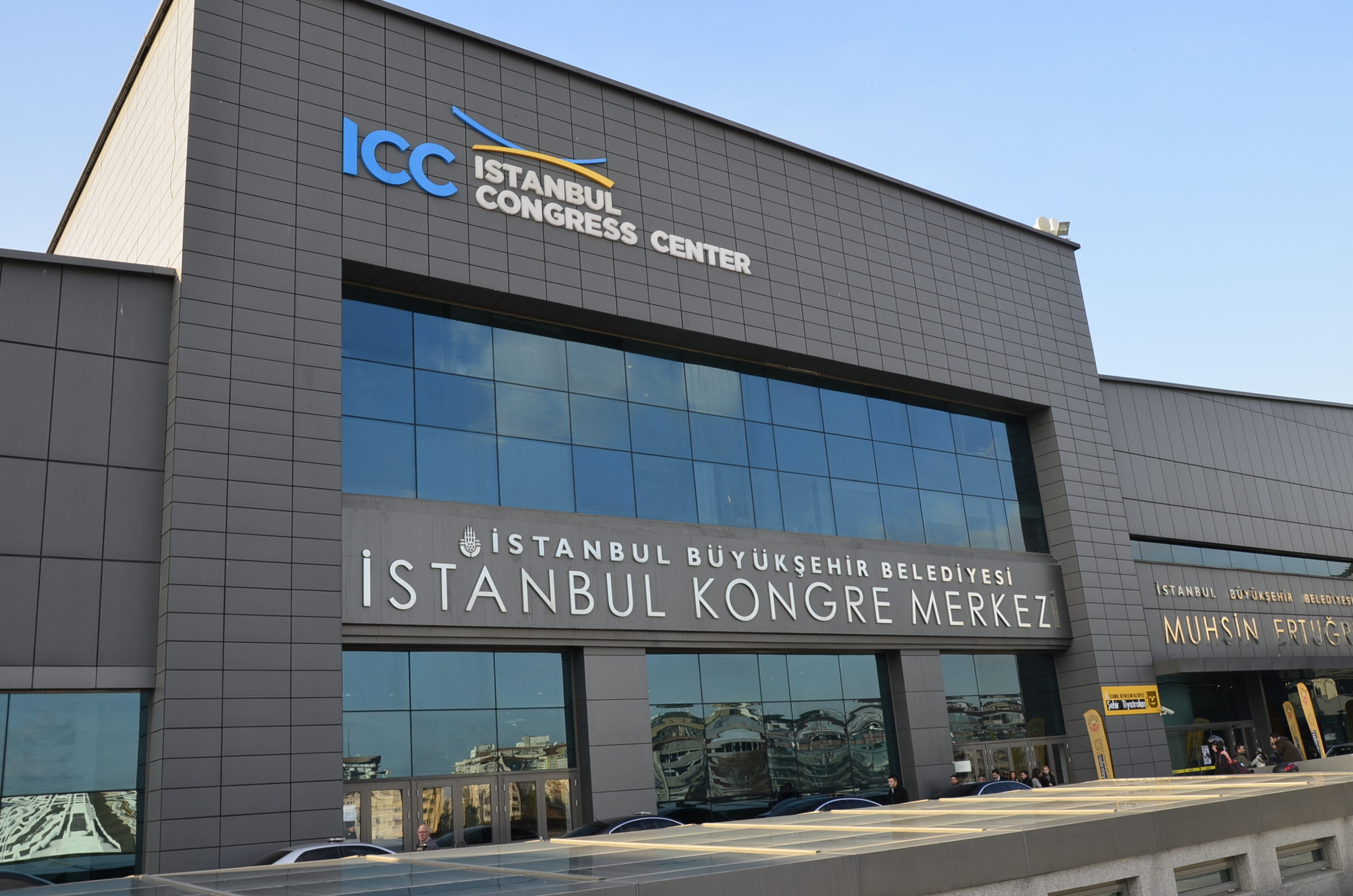
Istanbul Congress Center

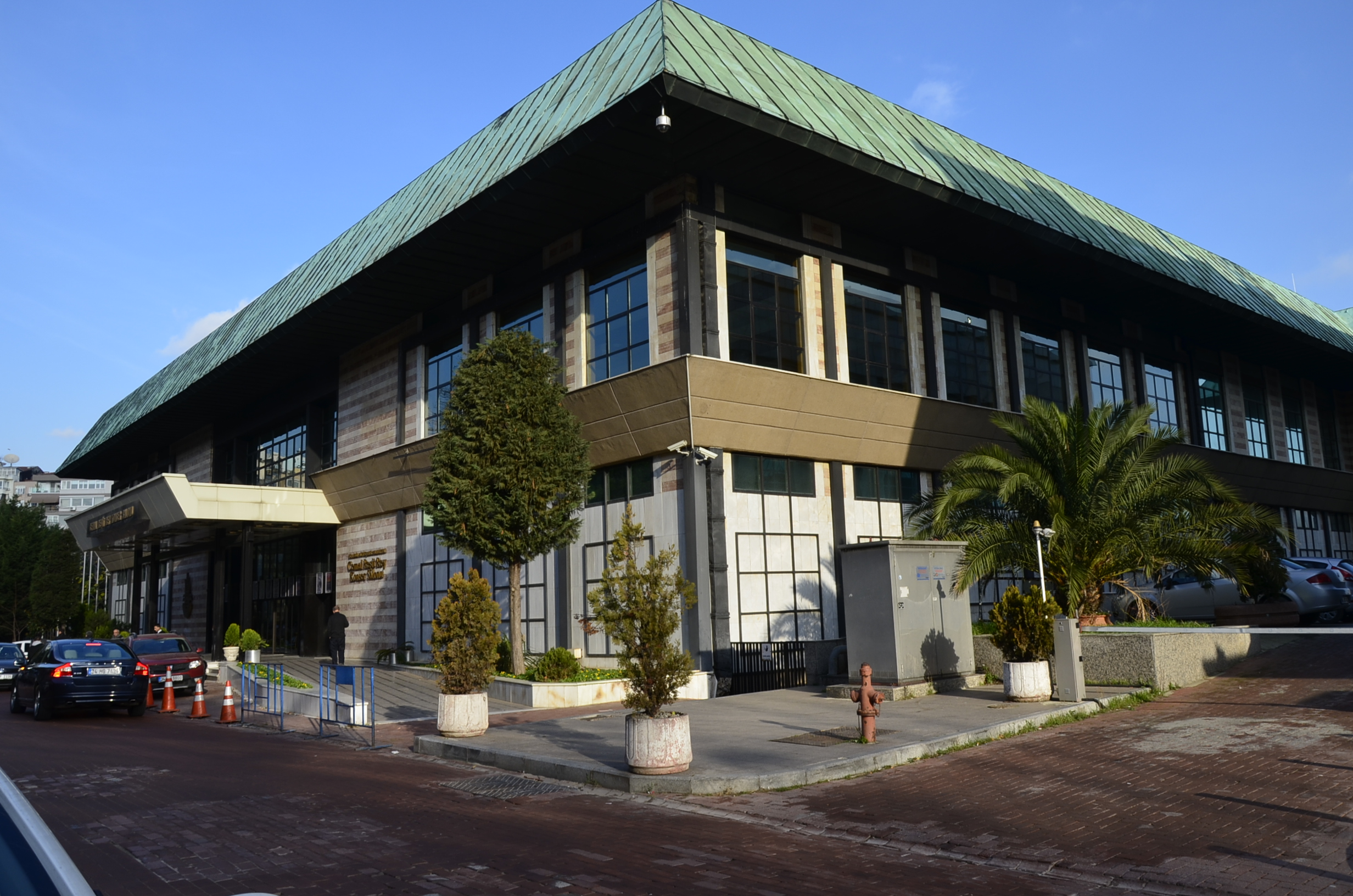
Cemal Reşit Rey Concert Hall

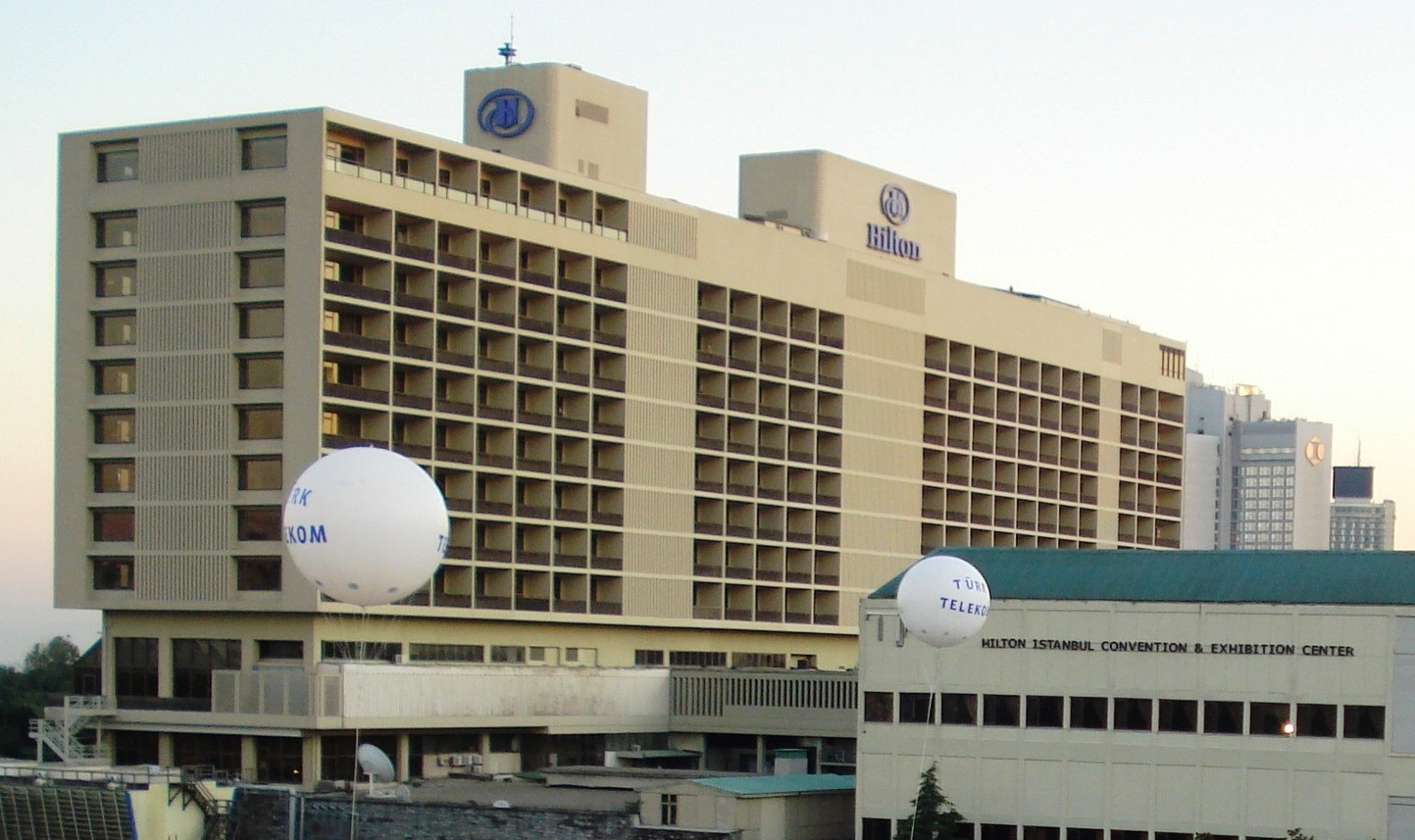
Hilton Istanbul Bosphorus

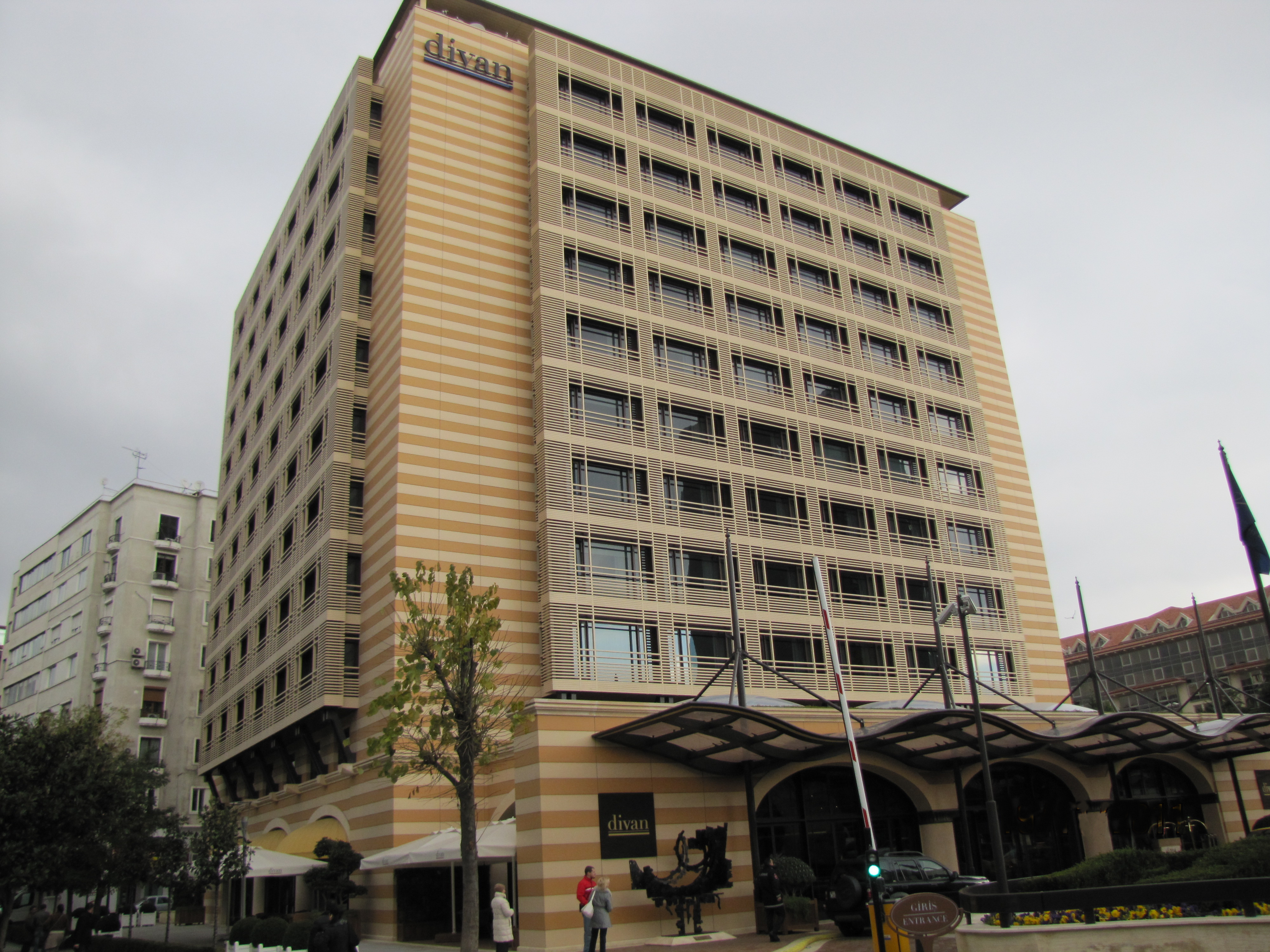
Divan Hotel
