= Istanbul Lütfi Kırdar International Convention and Exhibition Center =

Convention and exhibition center in Istanbul, Turkey

Istanbul Lütfi Kırdar International Convention and Exhibition Center (ICEC)
- İstanbul Lütfi Kırdar Uluslararası Kongre ve Sergi Sarayı
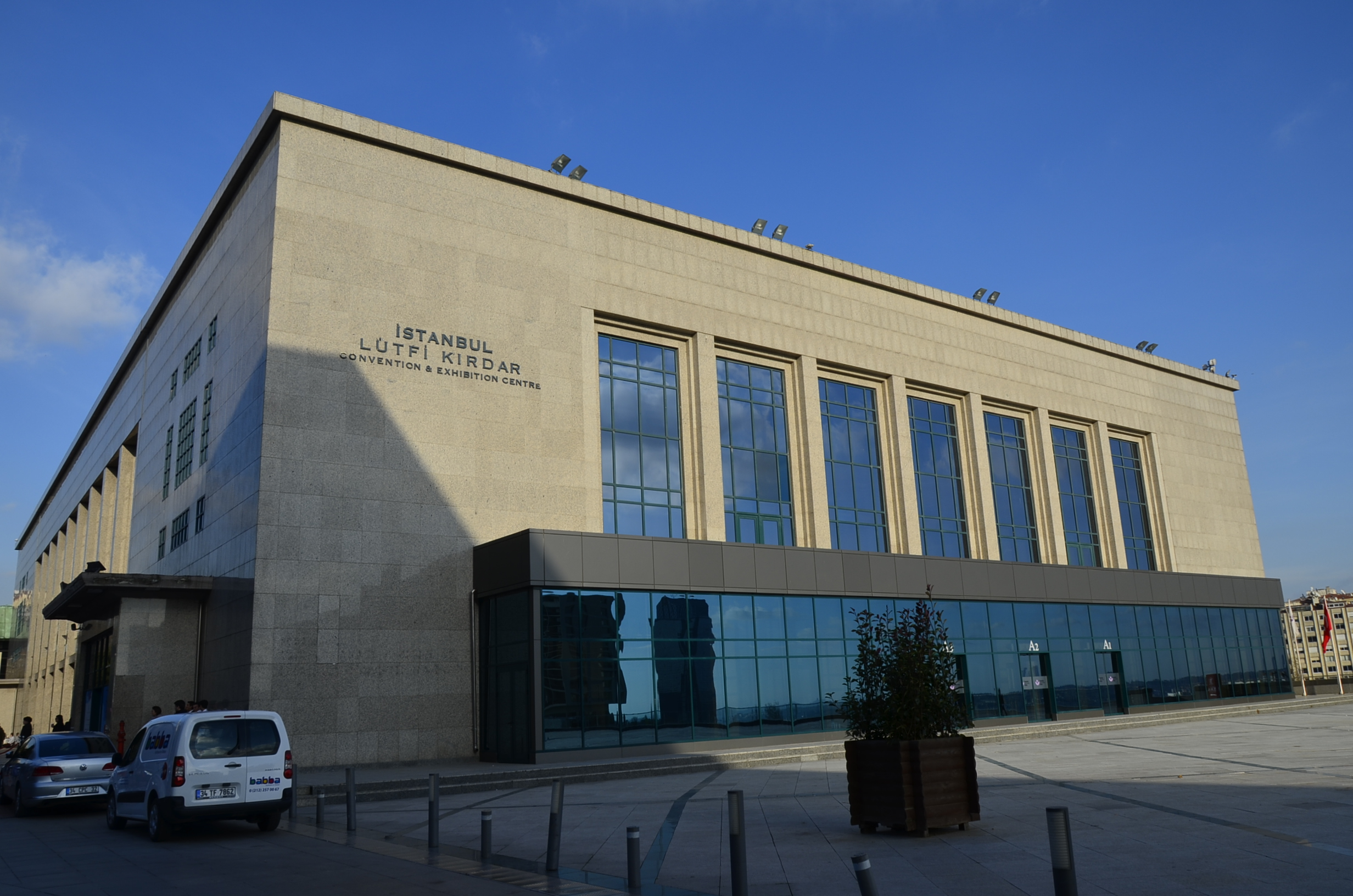
- Main building of Istanbul Lütfi Kırdar International Convention and Exhibition Center.

- Location within Istanbul
- Former names: Istanbul Sports and Exhibition Hall
- Alternative names: Istanbul Lütfi Kırdar ICEC

General information
- Location: Harbiye, Şişli, Gümüş Cad. 4, Istanbul, Turkey
- Coordinates: 41°02′52″N 28°59′22″E
- Groundbreaking: January 30, 1948
- Opened: June 3, 1949; 77 years ago
- Owner: Istanbul Metropolitan Municipality

Design and construction
- Architects: Paolo Vietti-Violi, Şinasi Şahingiray and Fazıl Aysu

Website
- www.icec.org

Istanbul Lütfi Kırdar International Convention and Exhibition Center, often referred as Istanbul Lütfi Kırdar ICEC, shortly ICEC, (Turkish: İstanbul Lütfi Kırdar Uluslararası Kongre ve Sergi Sarayı), formerly Istanbul Sports and Exhibition Hall (İstanbul Spor ve Sergi Sarayı), is a multi-purpose convention complex located in Harbiye neighborhood of Şişli district in Istanbul, Turkey.

Istanbul Lütfi Kırdar International Convention and Exhibition Center as the main building hosts along with its extension building, the "Rumeli Fair and Exhibition Center", important conventions, fairs, concerts, exhibitions as well as social and cultural events.

== History ==
Upon extraordinary success of the Turkish sport wrestlers achieved at the 1947 European Wrestling Championships and 1948 London Olympics, it was decided that the 1949 European Wrestling Championships take place in Istanbul. However, the city lacked an indoor sports venue appropriate for this event. Italian architect Paolo Vietti-Violi (1882-1965) and the Turkish architects Şinasi Şahingiray and Fazıl Aysu, who had designed also the Dolmabahçe Stadium in 1939, prepared the project.

The groundbreaking of the Istanbul Sports and Exhibition Hall building took place on January 30, 1948 in presence of the city's governor and mayor Lütfi Kırdar (1887-1961). Kırdar refused the proposal of the chairman of the Istanbul Soccer and Athletes' Federation made during the ceremony that the building to be named after him, with the rationale unethical while still alive and in office.

Right after the completion of the construction, it was opened on June 3, 1949 to host the European Wrestling Championships. The next event, which took place, was the Istanbul International Trade and Industry Fair held on October 2, 1949.

In the center's grand hall with a seating capacity of 7,000 people, many different national and international sports events took place, such as basketball, handball, volleyball, boxing, weightlifting, wrestling, ice skating, ice hockey and dancing competitions as well as circus shows. Remaining the country's only indoor sports and exhibition hall for many years, it hosted fairs, concerts, meetings and exhibitions by utilizing the other halls when needed.

On February 17, 1988, the hall was named in honor of Lütfi Kırdar at his 27th death anniversary. In 1996, the hall was transformed into a convention center to host the Habitat II, the Second United Nations Conference on Human Settlements, and was renamed then "Istanbul Lütfi Kırdar International Convention and Exhibition Center" (ICEC).

To meet the increasing demand in the sector, the venue was expanded with a new building in 2000, called "Rumeli Fair and Exhibition Center".

For hosting the 2009 IMF and World Bank Group Annual Meeting, the center was expanded with a nine-level underground submerged structure of 120,000 m^{2} (1,300,000 sq ft).

== Facilities ==
The Lütfi Kırdar Center as the main building of the complex consists of Anadolu Auditorium with a seating capacity of 2,000 people, Marmara Hall, two Topkapı halls, three Dolmabahçe halls, Galata Hall, Haliç Hall, three Sultan meeting rooms, three Barbaros meeting rooms, four Levent meeting rooms and VIP rooms.

The Rumeli Center offers a 7,000 m^{2} (75,000 sq ft) space as a preferred ballroom and fair area in central city. Upper Level is a 3,500-guest capacity activity area of 2,100 m^{2} (23,000 sq ft) divisible in four independent spaces with a 1,900 m^{2} (20,000 sq ft) foyer. Lower Level with separate entrance. Hisar meeting hall, small scale meeting rooms in the Mezzanine level and Rumeli Terrace are part of the building.

A restaurant with tradition, the Boğaziçi Borsa Restaurant, which is open seven days a week and capable of 250 guests, is housed within the Lütfi Kırdar Center.

The building is connected with a passage to Istanbul Congress Center and Harbiye Muhsin Ertuğrul Stage across the street, which is closed to traffic. A car park capable of 1,000 vehicles is available under this building complex.

== See also ==
- Istanbul Congress Center
