= Divan Istanbul =

Hotel in Istanbul, Turkey

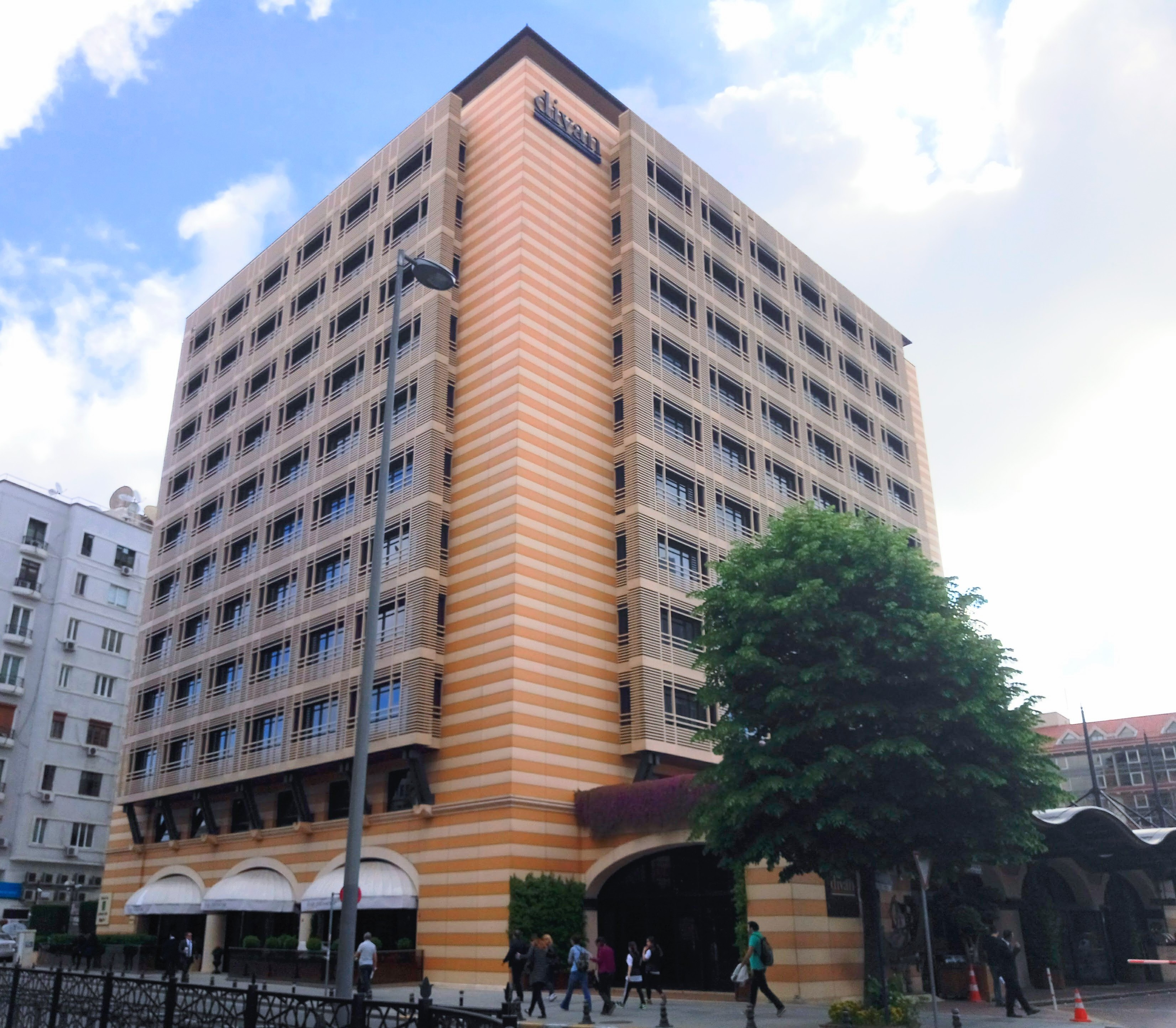

- Divan Istanbul in Istanbul

General information
- Location: Cumhuriyet Cad., Elmadağ, Şişli, Istanbul, Turkey
- Coordinates: 41°02′40″N 28°59′20″E
- Opening: 1956
- Owner: Divan Group

Technical details
- Floor count: 11

Other information
- Number of rooms: 191

Website
- www.divan.com.tr/divan-istanbul/en

The Divan Istanbul (Turkish: Divan İstanbul) is a five star hotel in Istanbul, Turkey. It is located next to Taksim Gezi Park in Elmadağ, Şişli, in walking distance from Taksim Square. Opened in 1956, it is the flagship of the Divan Group hotel chain.

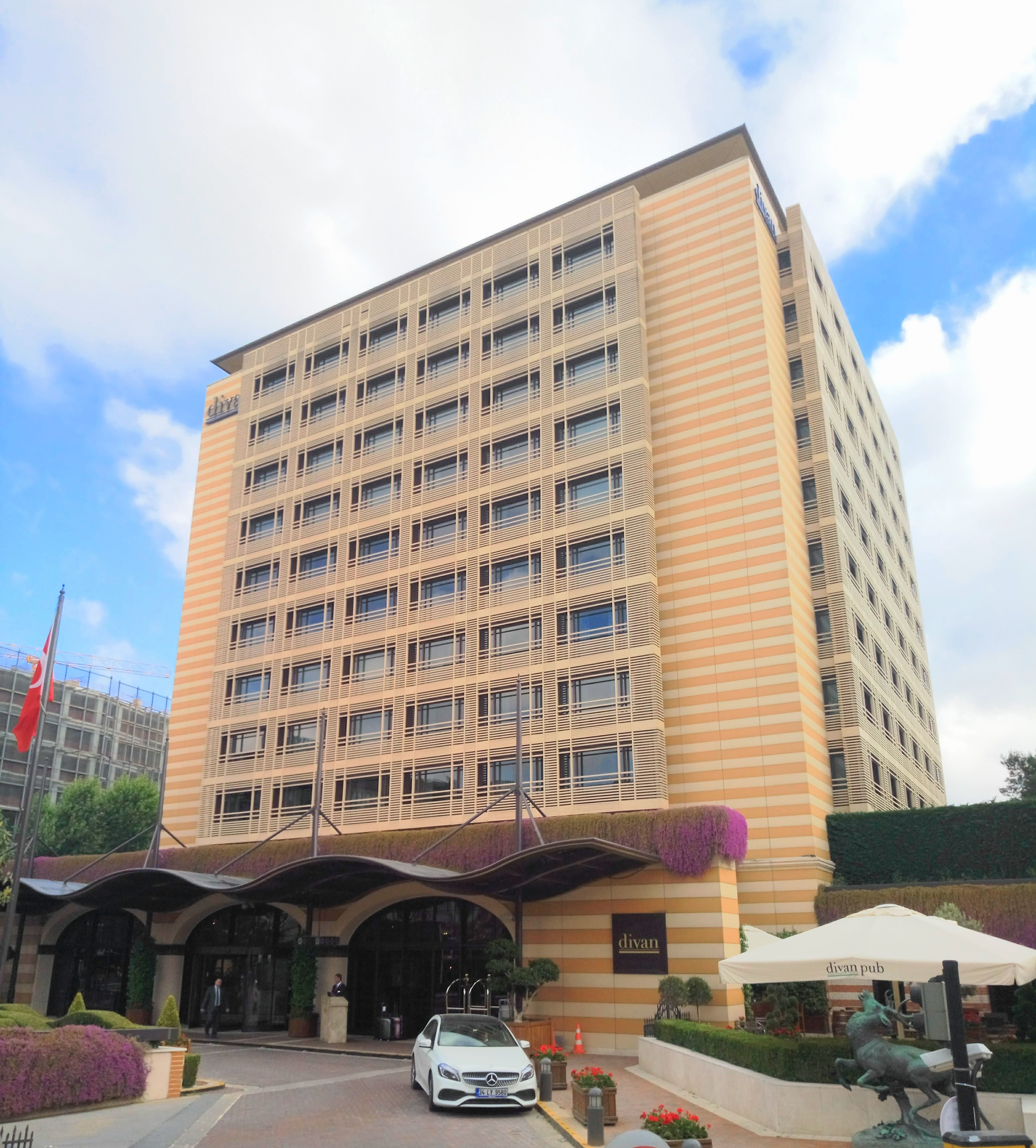
Entrance of Divan Hotel Istanbul

During the 2013 protests in Turkey it opened to injured protestors as well as those fleeing police attacks. During the night of 15/16 June, police repeatedly tear-gassed the lobby. As a result, according to Turkish Prime Minister Recep Tayyip Erdoğan, the hotel had helped criminals.

== See also ==
- Koç family
- Koç Holding
- Gezi Park protests
