= Sedad Hakkı Eldem =

Turkish architect (1908–1988)

- Portrait of Sedad Hakkı Eldem
- Born: Ömer Sedad Hakkı Eldem; August 31, 1908; Constantinople, Ottoman Empire
- Died: September 7, 1988 (aged 80); Istanbul, Turkey
- Occupation: Architect
- Awards: Aga Khan Award for Architecture (1986); National Architecture Awards (in Turkey) (Big Award) (1988)

Sedad Hakkı Eldem (31 August 1908 – 7 September 1988) was a Turkish architect known as a proponent of nationalized modern architecture in Turkey.

== Biography ==
Sedad Hakkı Eldem was born in Istanbul in 1908. He graduated from the Academy of Fine Arts, Department of Architecture. Between 1931 and 1932, he traveled to France, England, and Germany on a scholarship from the academy, exposing him to various architectural styles and movements.

In 1932, he opened his own office and began teaching at the Academy of Fine Arts, where he remained until his retirement in 1978. In 1934, he founded the National Architecture Seminar at the Academy, dedicated to the study and documentation of traditional Turkish houses. He argued that "these vernacular structures reflected modernist principles through the rationality of their floor plans and the clear structural logic of their timber-framed facades". Although much of the original research was lost in the Academy fire of 1948, it formed the foundation for his later works, including Türk Evi Plan Tipleri (1954; Plan Types of Turkish Houses) and the five-volume series Türk Evi (1984; The Turkish House). In 1938, he designed the Turkish Pavilion for the New York Exhibition.

Following World War II, Eldem represented Turkey at the International Union of Architects in Lausanne in 1948. The same year, Eldem collaborated with Emin Onat on the Istanbul Justice Palace. His work often involved studying the proportions and architectural features of 18th- and 19th-century Ottoman houses, palaces, and mansions.

He was a member of the Former Artefacts Maintenance Council (Eski Eserleri Muhafaza Encümeni) between 1941 and 1945 and also a member of the Supreme Council of Antiquities and Monument Real Estate (Gayrimenkul Eski Eserler ve Anıtlar Yüksek Kurulu) between 1962 and 1978.

Eldem sought to nationalise modern architecture, advocating for the adaptation of the international style to incorporate national and domestic elements rather than its uniform application.

In 1986, he received the Aga Khan Award for Architecture for the Zeyrek Social Security Facilities.

Eldem died on 7 September 1988 in Istanbul.

== Architecture ==
Eldem's architectural career can be divided into four main periods. The first period, from 1928 to 1934, is characterized by stylistic experimentation. This period is marked by his experimentation with different design elements, reflecting a search for a unique architectural identity. The second period, spanning from 1934 to 1952, is marked by modern adaptations of Ottoman architectural principles. From 1952 to 1962, his third period saw a decline in Ottoman influence and a move towards more modern designs. The final phase of his career, spanning from 1962 until his death in 1988, was characterized by a dual approach: one embracing monumental modernism, and the other integrating traditional Turkish architectural elements into contemporary contexts.

=== First period ===
The years between 1928 and 1934 are considered Eldem's formative years. During this time, he worked in Istanbul, Paris, and Berlin, but none of his architectural work from this period remains. The only structure built was a temporary Turkish pavilion for the Budapest Exhibition in 1931, offering limited insight into his architectural explorations. Eldem experimented with various contemporary approaches, attempting to combine elements from different architectural styles. For example, an embassy project in Paris shows the influence of Auguste Perret in its details, while its plan incorporates traditional middle "sofa" and "Eyvan" elements typical of Turkish architecture. He also drew inspiration from the Cihar-bağ scheme, common in Iran and the Middle East. During this period, he studied the styles of Art Deco, Le Corbusier, Hoffmann, Olbrich, Tessenow, and Webb. Despite his stylistic experimentation, he remained committed to researching traditional Ottoman civil architecture, utilizing styles that complemented it.

Returning from Europe to Istanbul did not immediately stabilise Eldem's architectural style. His early projects in Istanbul display diverse elements. The Ceylan Apartment (1933) exhibits traits of Art Deco, the S.A.T.İ.E. Store and Administration Building (1934) incorporates features of the International Style, and the Firdevs Hanım House (1934) includes elements of Le Corbusier. However, his focus shifted from large mansions to more modest houses and buildings, which were published in the journal Arkitekt.

=== Second period ===
Eldem's period of stylistic exploration is often considered to have ended with the Yalova Thermal Hotel (1934–1937) and the Ağaoğlu House (1936–1937) projects, marking a shift in his architecture. He began to gain recognition in Turkey for his approach to modern architecture. The Yalova Thermal Hotel is noted as an early example of nationalized modern architecture in Turkey. During these years, there was significant discussion about interpretation in modern architecture, and Eldem became a key figure advocating for the idea of nationalized modern architecture.

From 1934 to 1952, Eldem experimented with incorporating traditional Ottoman house plans and exterior elements into modernised designs, drawing on his research. He sought to "invent the tradition" within the modern context by incorporating traditional floor plan elements. For example, the Ağaoğlu House features an elliptical sofa (a central hall), the Safyurtlu House (1942) includes a middle sofa, and the Ayaşlı Mansion (1938) is designed with a karnıyarık ("split from the middle") type sofa, a layout where the central hall divides the structure symmetrically. Some of his projects connected international style and domestic tradition, while in others, traditional Turkish elements were subtle. The Taşlık Coffee House (1947–1948) was designed with a traditional T-shaped plan, minimizing international elements. In contrast, the Admiral Bristol Hospital and Nursing House (1943) has an exterior appearance informed by national elements, while the faculty buildings of Ankara University (1943–1945) and Istanbul University (1942–1947) were noted as being inspired by elements of Nazi Germany, with Turkish influence being a minor aspect of the designs.

=== Third period ===
Between 1952 and 1962, Eldem's architecture incorporated fewer Ottoman civil architectural characteristics. The Florya Facilities (1955–1959) and Rıza Derviş House (1956–1957) were built in a rationalized modernist style influenced by "California modernism". The design of the Istanbul Hilton (1952–1955) is often noted as showing little of Eldem's architectural style, its standard American appearance being attributed to the collaboration with Skidmore, Owings & Merrill (SOM), specifically Gordon Bunshaft, a leading figure in American modernist architecture. The Second Safyurtlu House (1952) is considered an example of late modernist architecture.

=== Final period ===
The years after 1960 are recognized as a period of change for both Eldem and the Republic of Turkey. Eldem adopted two distinct approaches during this time. The first was characterized by large, monumental forms, moving away from traditional styles, as seen in the Akbank Administration Building and Ayazağa Office Buildings. The second approach, deemed to be more characteristic of Eldem's later work, featured eclectic designs and new interpretations of Ottoman civil architecture, resulting in a recognizable vocabulary. This refers to Eldem's architectural style that blends modernist design with reinterpretations of traditional Ottoman civil architecture, featuring elements like horizontal roof lines, wide canopies, and proportioned windows and cantilevers. It included features such as horizontal roof lines, wide canopies, and well-proportioned windows and cantilevers, as seen in the designs of the Zeyrek Social Security Facilities (1962–1964), India Embassy Residence (1965–1968), Kıraç Mansion (1965), and Sirer Mansion (1966–1967).

== List of significant works ==
- First period (1928–1934)
  - 1931: Turkish Pavilion in Budapest Exhibition, Budapest
  - 1932: Ceylan Apartment in Taksim, Istanbul
  - 1932: S.A.T.İ.E. Store and Administration Building in Fındıklı, Istanbul
  - 1934: Firdevs Hanım Apartment in Maçka, Istanbul
  - 1934: Thermal Hotel in Yalova
  - 1936: Ağaoğlu House in Teşvikiye, Istanbul
- Second period (1934–1952)
  - 1938: Ayaşlı Mansion in Beylerbeyi, Istanbul
  - 1942: Safyurtlu Villa in Beşevler, Ankara
  - 1942: Istanbul University, Faculty of Science in Beyazit, Istanbul
  - 1943: Ankara University, Faculty of Science in Beşeveler, Ankara
  - 1943: Admiral Bristol Hospital and Nursing House in Teşvikiye, Istanbul
  - 1947: Taşlık Coffee House in Maçka, Istanbul
- Third period (1952–1962)
  - 1952: Second Safyurtlu House in Yeniköy, Istanbul
  - 1955: Florya Facilities in Florya, Istanbul
  - 1955: Istanbul Hilton, Istanbul (in collaboration with Gordon Bunshaft of SOM)
  - 1956: Rıza Derviş House in Büyükada, Istanbul
  - 1956: Uşaklıgil House in Emirgan, Istanbul
- Fourth period (1962–1988)
  - 1960: India Embassy Residence in Cinnah Street, Ankara
  - 1962: Social Security Facilities in Zeyrek, Istanbul
  - 1964: Siner Mansion in Yeniköy, Istanbul
  - 1965: Kıraç Mansion in Vaniköy, Istanbul
  - 1966: Akbank Administration Building in Fındıklı, Istanbul
  - 1973: Netherlands Embassy in Ankara
  - 1975: Koç House in Tarabya, Istanbul
