= Şişli =

- District and municipality
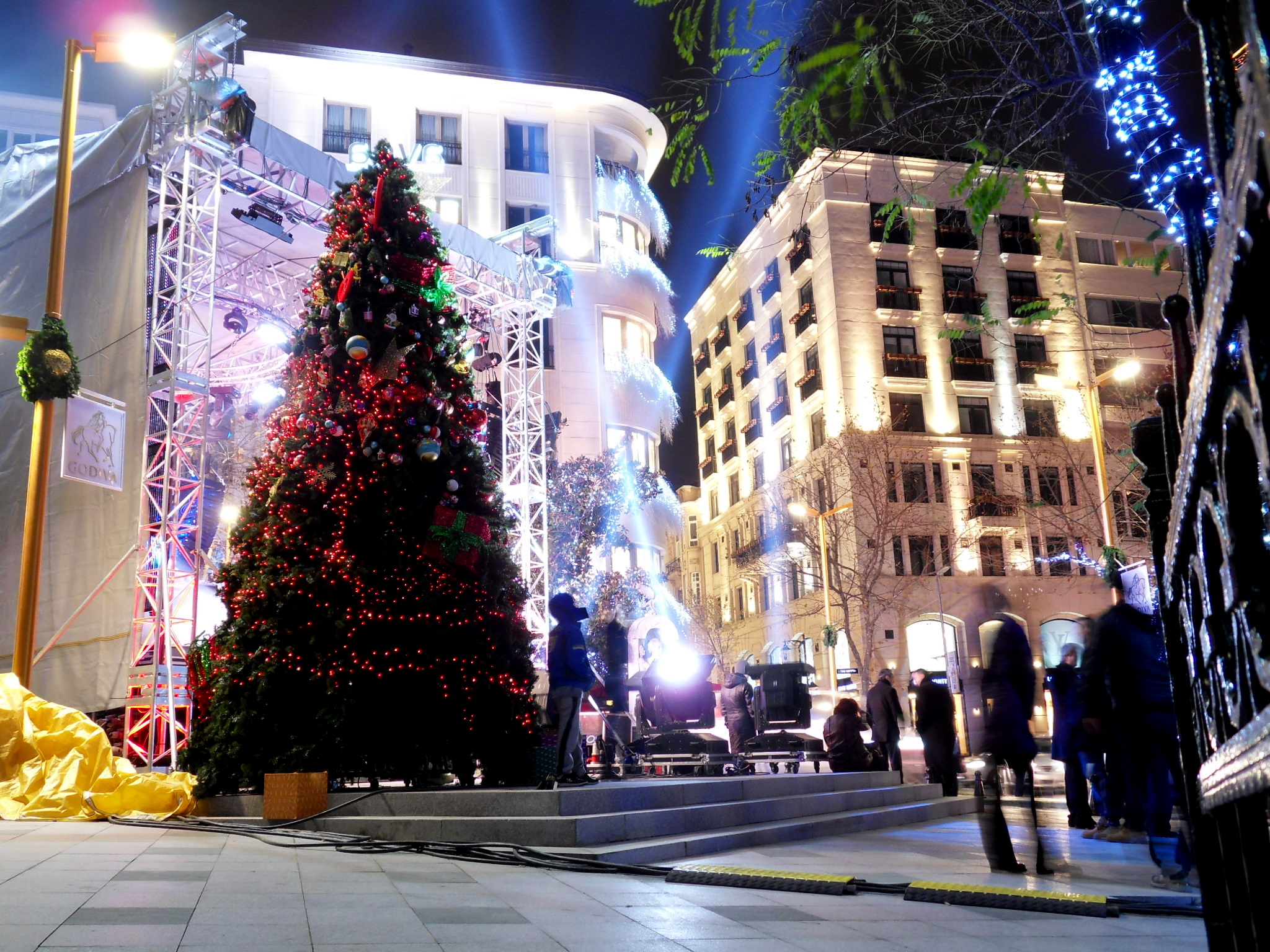
- New Year's Eve decorations at the Nişantaşı quarter

- Logo

- Map showing Şişli district in Istanbul Province

- Location within Turkey Location within Istanbul
- Coordinates: 41°03′37″N 28°59′16″E
- Country: Turkey
- Province: Istanbul

Government
  - Mayor: Cevdet Ertürkmen (State Appointment)
- Area: 10 km^{2} (3.9 sq mi)
- Highest elevation: 140 m (460 ft)
- Lowest elevation: 70 m (230 ft)
- Population (2022): 276,528
  - Density: 28,000/km^{2} (72,000/sq mi)
- Time zone: UTC+3 (TRT)
- Postal code: 34360, 34371, 34373, 34375, 34377, 34379, 34380, 34382, 34394, 34396
- Area code: 0212
- Website: www.sisli.bel.tr

Şişli (pronounced [ˈʃiʃli]) is a municipality and district of Istanbul Province, Turkey. Its area is 10 km^{2}, and its population is 276,528 (2022). Located on the European side of the city, it is bordered by Beşiktaş to the east, Sarıyer to the north, Kağıthane to the west, and Beyoğlu to the south. It is also the name of a specific area of Şişli district centered on the Sişli Mosque.

== History ==
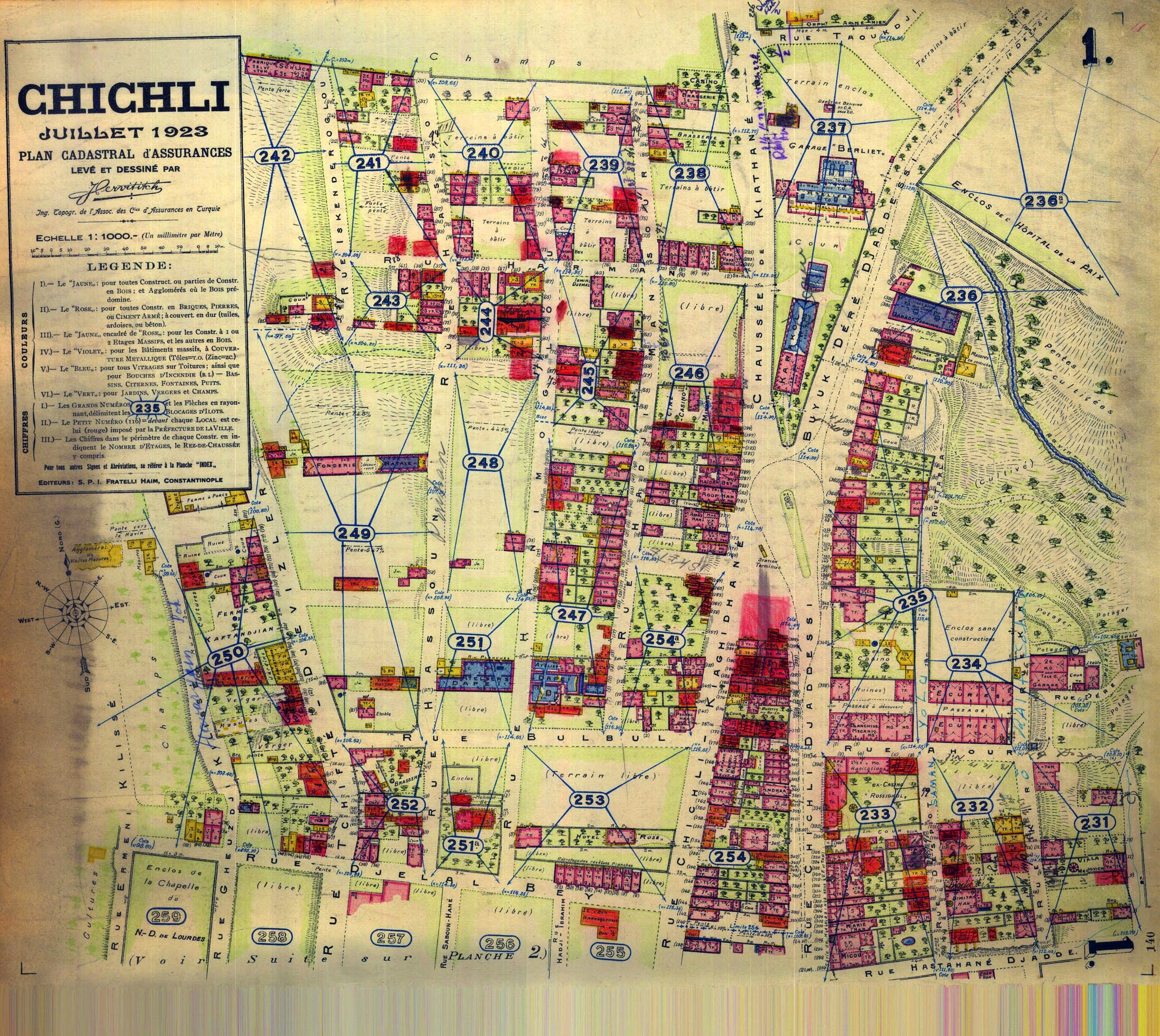
Historic map of early Şişli

Until the 1800s, Şişli was open countryside, used for hunting, agriculture and leisure. It was developed as a middle class residential district during the last years of the Ottoman Empire and the early years of the Turkish Republic (the late 19th-early 20th centuries). French culture was an important influence in this period and the wide avenues of Şişli were lined with large stone buildings with high ceilings and Art Nouveau wrought-iron balconies, which often had little elevators on wires in the middle of the stairways. This trading middle-class was composed of Jews, Greeks and Armenians, as well as some Turks, many of whom built homes in Şişli after a large fire devastated the neighbouring district of Pera (now Beyoğlu) in 1870. To this day, several families from Istanbul's local Armenian community live in the Kurtuluş neighbourhood of Şişli. The area was also popular with the Catholic Levantine trading families of this period who settled in Istanbul for trade or were contracted by the Ottoman Empire. Şişli also attracted migrants from former possessions in Greece and the Balkans. In the late 19th century, Şişli was one of the first areas supplied with tramlines, electricity and natural gas. The Darülaceze orphanage and the large Şişli Etfal Hospital were built here in this period, as well as the French schools of St. Michel and Notre Dame de Sion.

Following the founding of the Turkish Republic in the 1920s, larger and larger buildings were built along wide avenues such as Halaskargazi Caddesi, the main road that runs through the middle of Şişli, with its little arcades of shops below tall apartment and office buildings. In the republican era, the area was still popular with the middle classes but also attracted a growing population of traders. Writers and poets also favoured the area, and Şişli acquired theatres, cafes and other cultural amenities. The Hilton Istanbul Bosphorus was built here in the 1950s and many others followed.

From the 1950s onwards people from Anatolia began to migrate to Istanbul in search of work. In most cases they built themselves illegal squats on unclaimed or government-owned land (see gecekondu). Some of these people settled in parts of Şişli in the 1950s and 1960s, especially in the northern sections of the district, around Mecidiyeköy.

=== Centre of Şişli today ===
Now that the wealthy elite of central Şişli has moved into less central suburbs of the city, the large buildings on the grand avenues are occupied by offices, banks, and big shops, forming the largest part of the Istanbul Central Business District. Since the 1970's, most older buildings have been pulled down and replaced with newer, and less traditional, multi-storey structures. The back streets are still residential, and many working-class families and students have settled there. There are plenty of shops, cafés, pubs, and other amenities. Although Şişli is not a wealthy district today, its central location still makes it a desirable place to live by many.

== Business and shopping ==
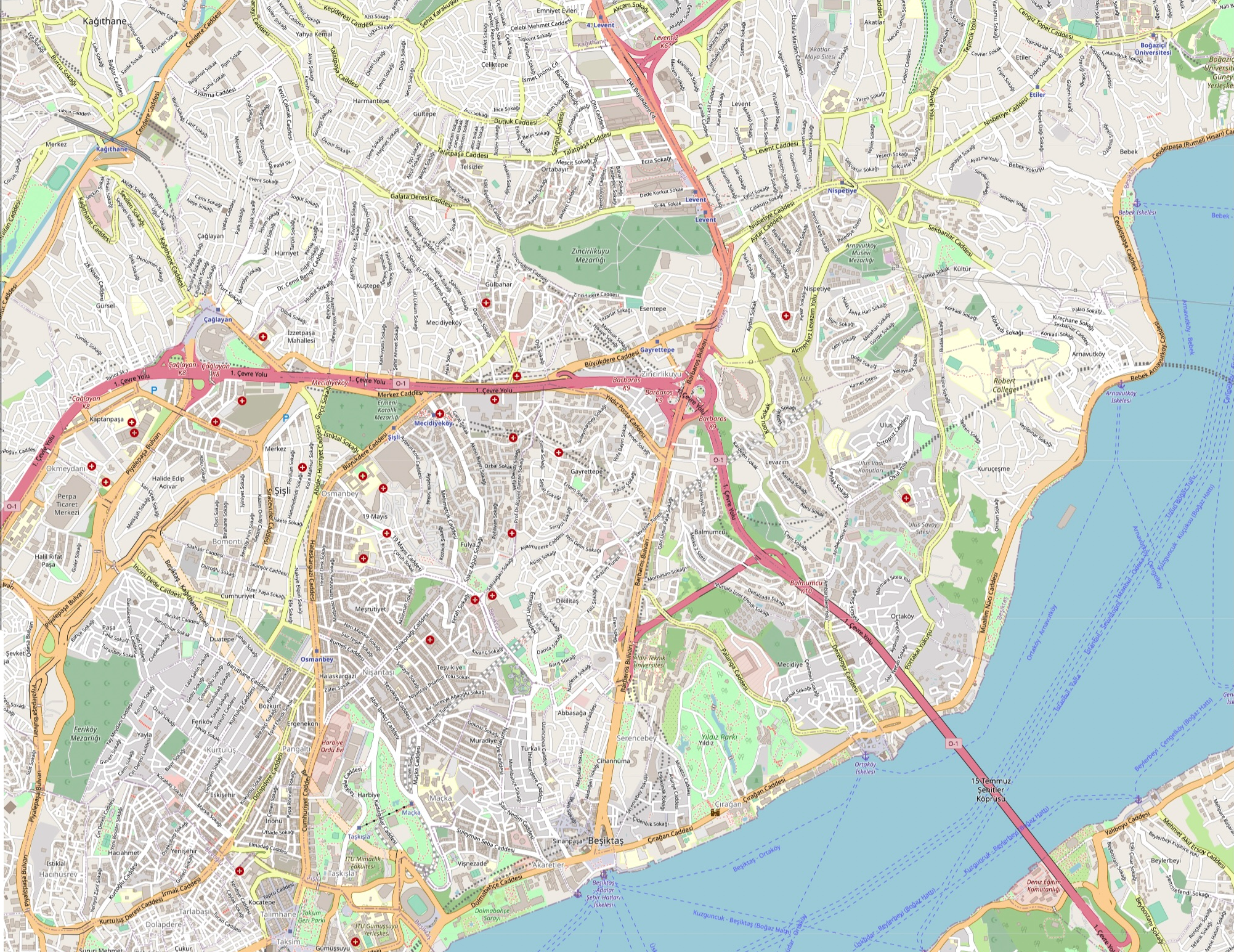
Map showing Şişli's key business and shopping centers, universities, and selected metro stations and landmarks

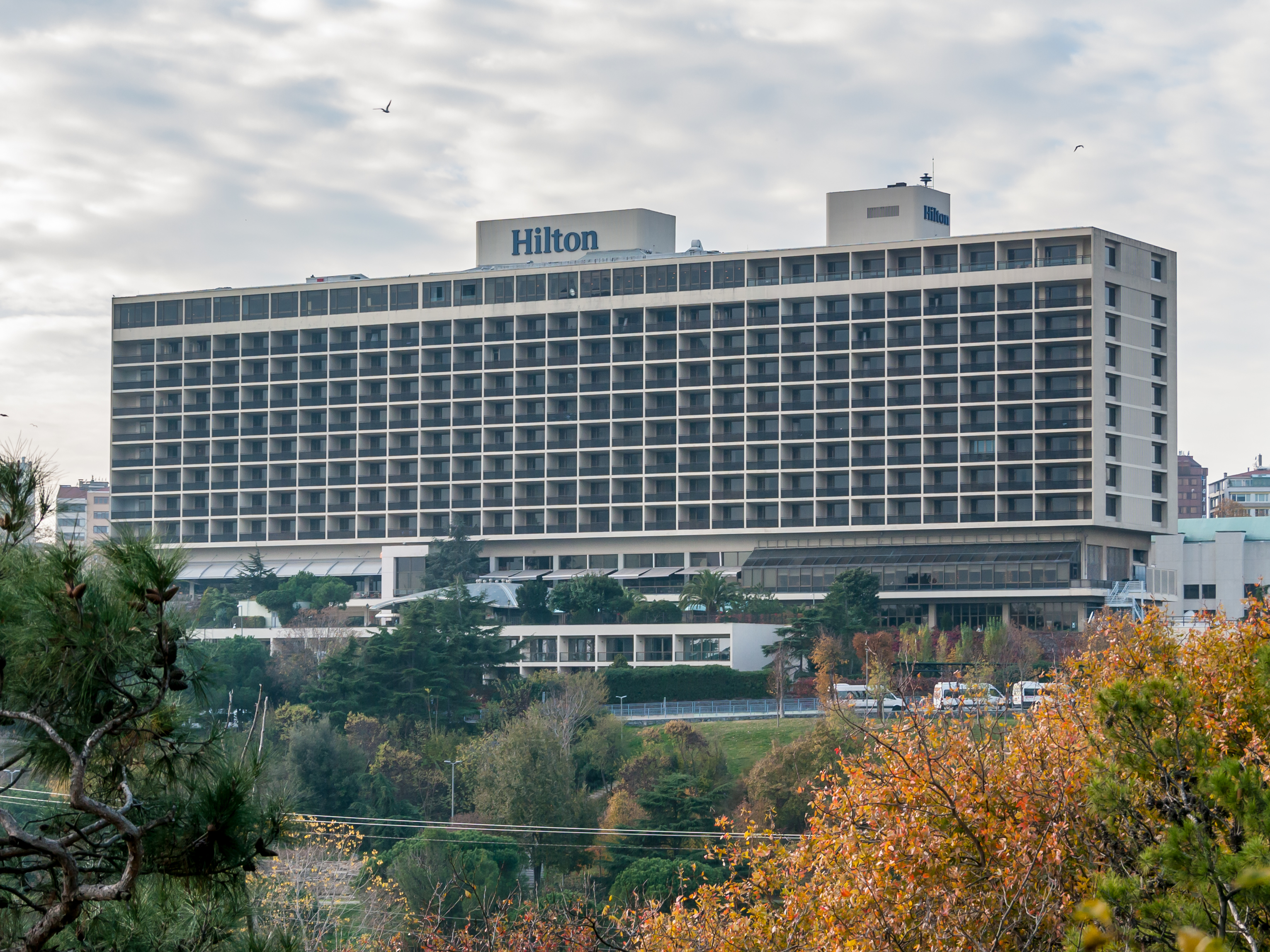
Hilton Istanbul Bosphorus (1955), first Hilton in Europe, longest serving Hilton outside the U.S., location in the James Bond film From Russia with Love (1963)

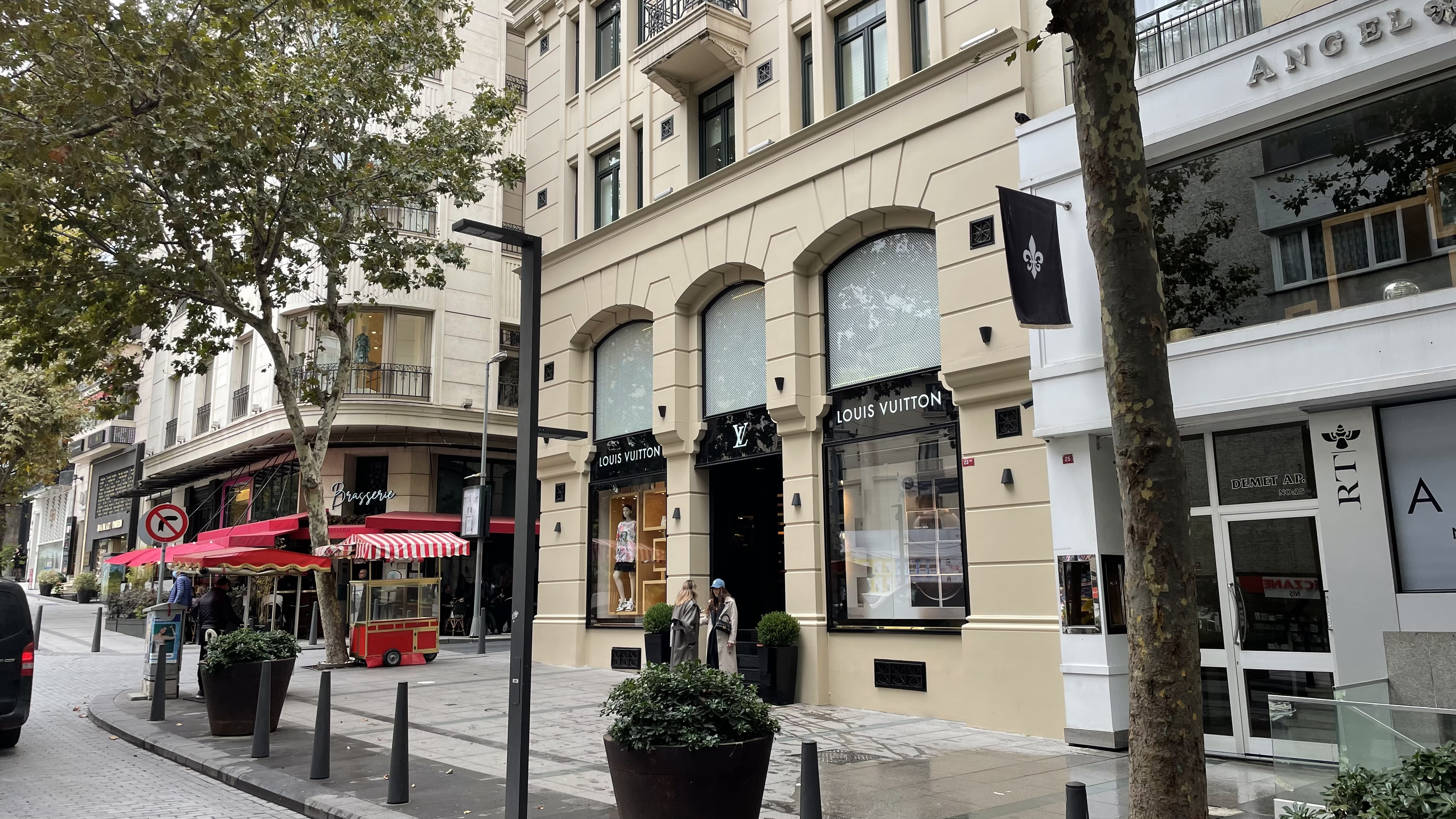
Abdi İpekçi Street in the Nişantaşı quarter of Şişli district is one of the premier shopping streets of Istanbul.

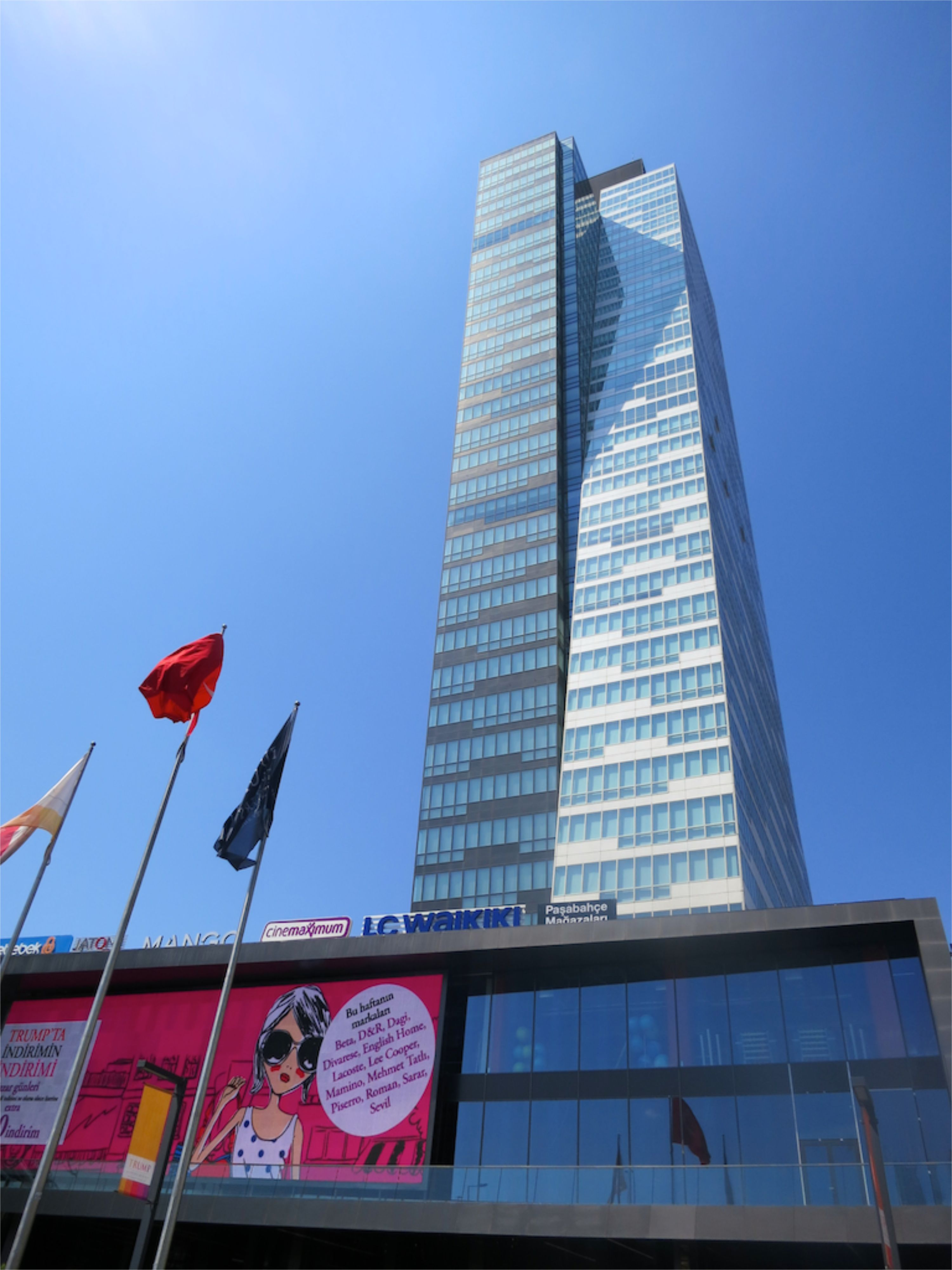
Trump Towers Istanbul (2012) in Mecidiyeköy, designed by Brigitte Weber Architects, is the first Trump building in Europe.

Being a central area well-served with public-transport and other infrastructure, Şişli is a center of trade and shopping. The main road through Şişli up to the skyscrapers of Mecidiyeköy, Gayrettepe, Levent and beyond is now lined with office blocks. Europe's largest and the world's second largest (urban-area) shopping mall, Cevahir İstanbul, is situated here. Due to Şişli's middle-class past and the enduring quality of some neighbourhoods the area is home to many upmarket shops mainly in the affluent Nişantaşı area. Parking is an enduring problem, especially in the narrow side-streets.

People also come to Şişli for schooling; this city-centre area has some well-known high schools and a great number of dersane (preparatory courses for the annual university entrance exams), evening and weekend schools where people come to cram for university or high school entrance examinations, or to learn English.

There are many well-established cafes and restaurants.

== Politics ==
The last elected mayor of Şişli was Muammer Keskin from the secularist Republican People's Party. He was deposed by the government on 23 March 2025, and the kaymakam (sub-governor) of Şişli, Cevdet Ertürkmen, was appointed as mayor of Şisli.

== Neighbourhoods ==
Officially designated neighborhoods of Şişli. Some unofficial ones such as Bomonti are not shown.

There are 25 neighbourhoods in Şişli district:

- 19 Mayıs
- Bozkurt
- Cumhuriyet
- Duatepe
- Ergenekon
- Esentepe
- Eskişehir
- Feriköy
- Fulya
- Gülbahar
- Halaskargazi
- Halide Edip Adıvar
- Halil Rıfat Paşa
- Harbiye
- İnönü
- İzzet Paşa
- Kaptanpaşa
- Kuştepe
- Mahmut Şevket Paşa
- Mecidiyeköy
- Meşrutiyet
- Paşa
- Şişli Merkez
- Teşvikiye
- Yayla

== Important quarters ==
- Şişli Merkez (lit. "Şişli Center") and Cumhuriyet Avenue (Cumhuriyet Caddesi) to its south, commonly called Bomonti after the former Bomonti Brewery, now repurposed as the Bomontiada arts center, including the Babylon event venue featuring regular live music. There is also a presidential museum, and photography on display at the Ara Guler Museum. The name Bomonti is referenced in the name of the Bomonti Hilton hotel, the 39-story Bomonti Park tower, etc.
- Esentepe - home to the Municipality of Şişli and Zincirlikuyu Cemetery. Neighboring Gayrettepe and Levent neighborhoods of Beşiktaş district and Mecidiyeköy neighborhood, Esentepe also covers the west side of Büyükdere Street at Levent, where most of the plazas are located.
- Kurtuluş – formerly Tatavla (Greek: Ταταύλα, "horse stable") in the Ottoman period, was home to a Greek and later Armenian community. The district had mostly wooden houses until the fire on April 13, 1929. Afterwards, it was rebuilt in narrow stone streets and, over time, concrete buildings, lined with cafés, patisseries, and shops. This cosmopolitan district has a long history, and has been home to many singers, artists, and actors. There are a small number of old apartment buildings. It was also known mainly for its traditional carnival, which was organized every year before Lent. The peak of the carnival, on the last day of Lent, took place in Kurtuluş and was known as Baklahorani. After the riots of 1955, the Greek community left the area; however, their churches are open on religious holidays.
- Teşvikiye – uphill from Beşiktaş, an area with many classic European-style buildings as well as a busy high-class shopping district. Since the 19th century, Teşvikiye has been home to many writers (including journalist Abdi Ipekçi, who was assassinated here in 1979), politicians and a great number of prominent business families and still holds a well-established middle-class, including some descendants of Levantine and Jewish families that built many of the stone apartment buildings of Teşvikiye in the Ottoman period. Prominent buildings include the Milli Reasürans building, and the neo-Baroque Teşvikiye Mosque, who established the neighbourhood by building the mosque and the nearby historic Teşvikiye Police Station, encouraging citizens of Istanbul to settle in this new district (hence the name Teşvikiye, from teşvik, encouragement in Turkish.) Abdi İpekçi Avenue. There are a number of well-known schools, including some buildings of Marmara University and Işık Lisesi.
- Nişantaşı – neighbourhood encompassing Teşvikiye and Harbiye, famous for its many Art Nouveau apartment buildings. The American Hospital, one of the city's best hospitals, is also located here. Nişantaşı is famous for high-end shopping along Abdi İpekçi Caddesi, Turkey's most expensive street in terms of lease prices, and the city's Nişantaşı mall.
- Mecidiyeköy – Business and shopping district north of the O-1 highway; Istanbul's main market for computer equipment. Narrow streets of tall office buildings. Home of Galatasaray football club's Ali Sami Yen Stadium. The Profilo Shopping Center, with its food court, cinemas and bowling alley, is here. Mecidiyeköy Antikacılar Çarşısı (Mecidiyeköy Antiques Bazaar), a large multi-storey building with dozens of antiques shops (the largest of its kind in Istanbul) is located at the eastern edge.
- Harbiye - An Ottoman military district home to the Ottoman War Academy (Mekteb-i Harbiye). The academy is the Istanbul Military Museum today. The neighborhood is known for the cultural institutions located in it including the Harbiye Muhsin Ertuğrul Stage,the Cemal Reşit Rey Concert Hall, the Istanbul Congress Center and the Cemil Topuzlu Open-Air Theatre. The Maçka Park, the architecture faculty of the Istanbul Technical University and the Hilton Istanbul Bosphorus are also located in the neighborhood.
- Okmeydanı – in the north of Şişli, home to some large hospitals. This was the archery practice ground of the Ottoman armies (hence the name, lit. the square of arrows), an Ottoman mosque was built here. Later the land was planted with fruit trees, and in the 1960s turned over to developers for building as the city expanded. Darülaceze, the Ottoman-period orphanage, is here, built in 1896.
- Kuştepe – north of the O-1 highway, a gecekondu (illegally built) district of poor housing traditionally occupied by the Romani people in Turkey community and recent migrants from the countryside. Trump Tower and AVM (mall) are located here along the O-1.
- Pangaltı - home to Saint James Armenian Hospital and Cathedral of the Holy Spirit.

== Places of interest ==
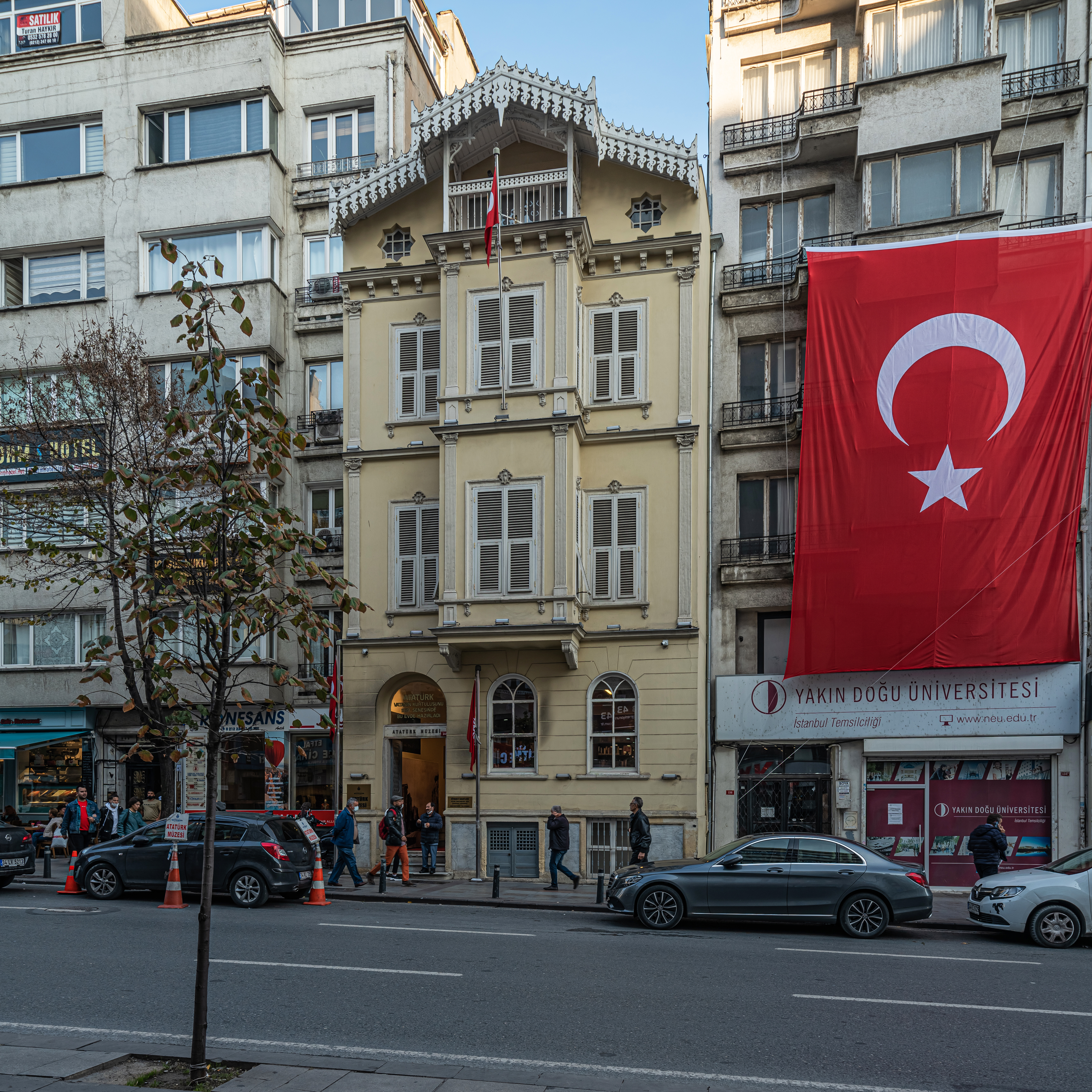
The house of Mustafa Kemal Atatürk, today the Atatürk Museum, in central Şişli.

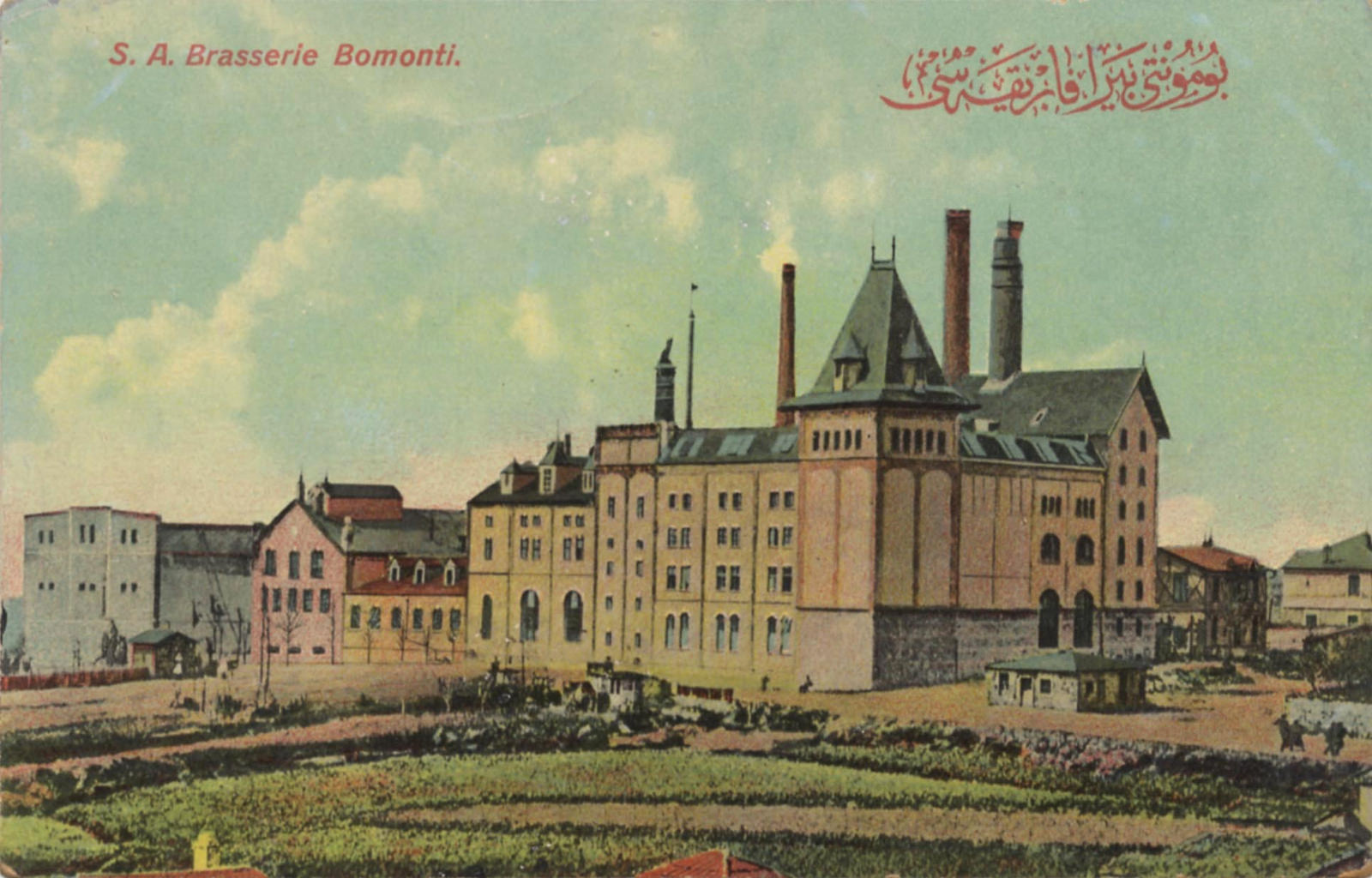
The Bomonti Beer Factory in 1902. Portions are now part of the Bomontiada arts venue.

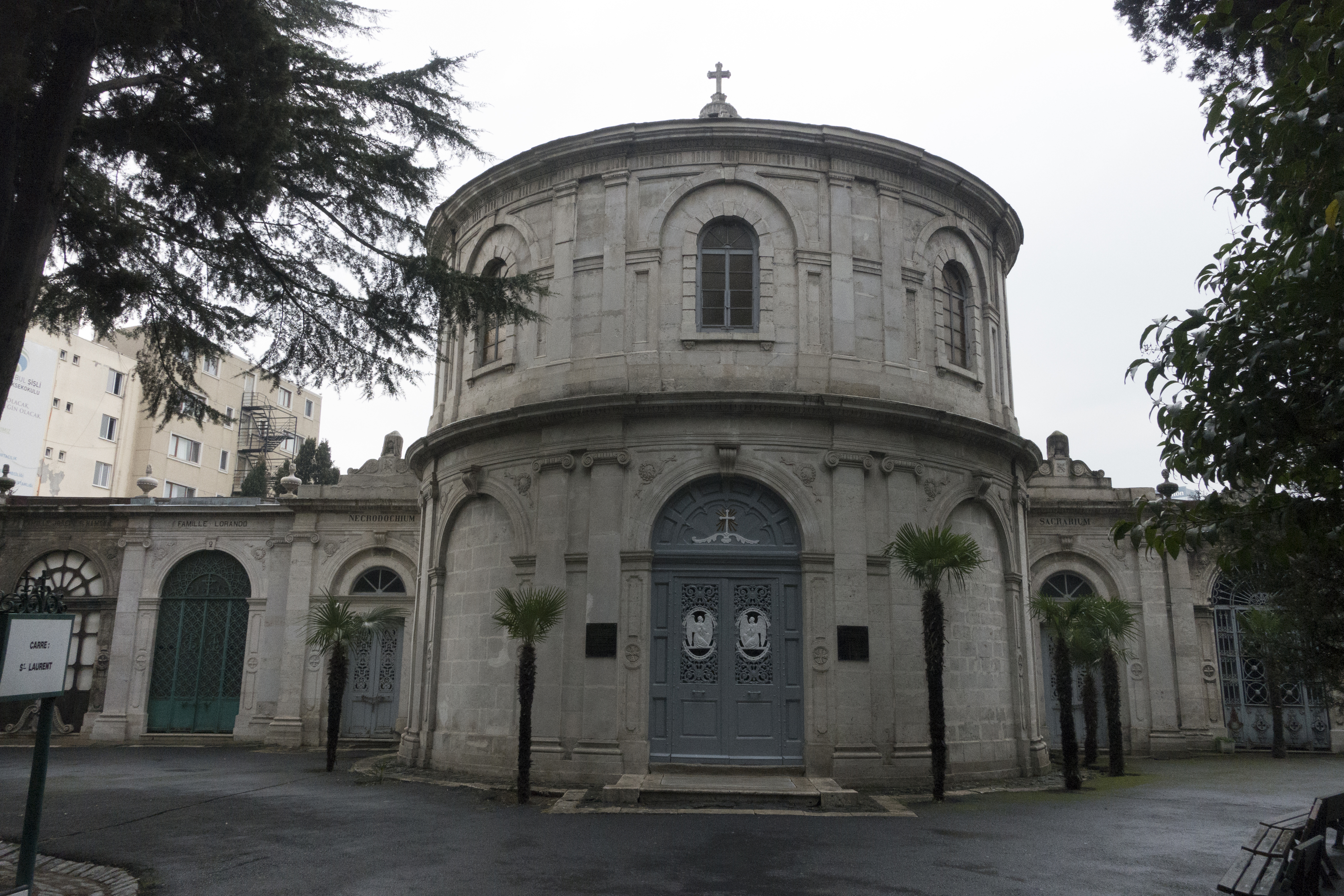
Pangaltı Catholic Cemetery

=== Arts, entertainment, and sports venues ===
- Bomontiada, incorporating parts of the former Bomonti Brewery^{(tr)}
- Cemal Reşit Rey Concert Hall
- Cemil Topuzlu Open-Air Theatre
- Türk Telekom Stadium

=== Museums and historical places ===
- Istanbul Military Museum
- Atatürk Museum
- Ihlamur Palace
- Monument of Liberty

=== Religious buildings ===
- Şişli Mosque
- Teşvikiye Mosque
- Cathedral of the Holy Spirit

=== Cemeteries ===
- Pangaltı Catholic Cemetery
- Şişli Armenian Cemetery
- Zincirlikuyu Cemetery

=== Shopping malls ===
- Cevahir Mall
- Kanyon Shopping Mall
- MetroCity AVM
- Profilo Shopping Center

=== Skyscrapers ===
- Diamond of Istanbul
- Istanbul Sapphire
- Sabancı Center
- Şişli Plaza
