= Pangaltı Armenian Cemetery =

Former Armenian Cemetery in Istanbul

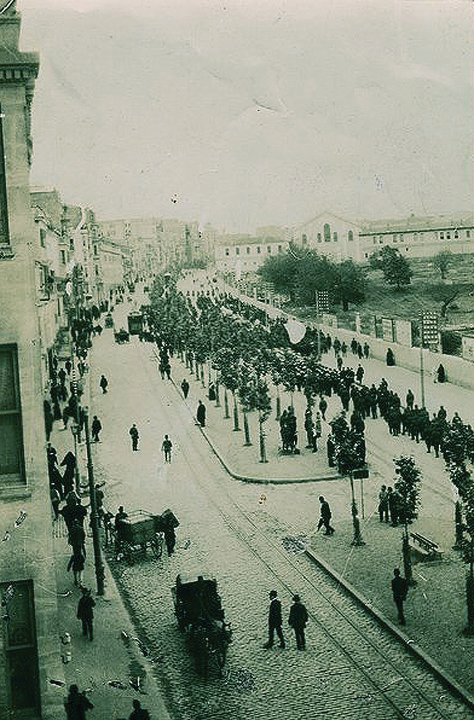
- A funeral procession in front of the Pangalti Armenian Cemetery, 1913
- Interactive map of Pangaltı Armenian Cemetery

Details
- Established: c. 1560 - 1930
- Location: Istanbul, Turkey
- Country: Turkey
- Coordinates: 41.04225°N 28.98825°E
- Type: Private Armenian cemetery
- Owned by: Surp Agop Armenian Hospital

The Pangaltı Armenian Cemetery was a cemetery in Istanbul, Turkey, located in the Pangaltı quarter, near Taksim Square. Founded in 1560, the cemetery ceased to be used for burials in 1865, and was demolished in the 1930s.

== History ==
The Pangaltı cemetery was founded in 1560 after an epidemic caused the Armenian community of Constantinople to petition Sultan Suleyman. It was enlarged in 1780 and enclosed by a wall in 1853. The cemetery was located in the Pangaltı quarter, near Taksim Square, and originally belonged to the Surp Agop Armenian Hospital.

The Pera district was very close to the cemetery, so an outbreak of cholera in 1865 led the government to ban burials and allocate them to the Şişli Armenian Cemetery instead.

In the 1930s, it was demolished and was replaced with the Taksim Gezi Park, Divan Hotel, Hilton Hotel, Hyatt Regency Hotel, and the TRT Radio Buildings. and in 1939 its marble tombstones were sold. Gezi Park's fountains and stairs were built from the cemetery.

Other parts of the cemetery were used to construct Eminönü Square which was, along with Gezi Park, designed by city planner Henri Prost.

In 1932, Mesrob Naroyan, the Armenian Patriarchate of Constantinople, filed a lawsuit for the return of the property, but the Istanbul Municipality argued that he had been a legal non-entity in Turkey since 1916 (the position of Armenian Patriarchate had been officially suspended in 1916 as part of the Armenian genocide) and therefore had no title to the land, even though he still functioned at the Armenian Patriarchate of Constantinople in Kumkapı, Istanbul. The Patriarchate acknowledged the lack of title, but argued legitimacy to represent the cemetery on behalf of both the Armenian Catholic Community and the Surp Agop Armenian Hospital. The commission investigated land ownership and found the Patriarch's claims groundless, so title remained with the Istanbul municipality and the third party owners.

Armenian tombstones of the cemetery discovered in 2013 during excavations at Gezi Park

In 2013, during excavation work for the reconstruction of Taksim Square, 16 tombstones from the Armenian cemetery were discovered.

== Significance ==
Pangaltı Armenian Cemetery is considered to have been the largest non-Muslim cemetery in Istanbul's history.

== See also ==
- Armenians in Turkey
- Confiscated Armenian Properties in Turkey
