= Olbricht =

Olbricht is a surname. Notable people with the surname include:

- Alexander Olbricht (1876–1942), German artist
- Bernd Olbricht (born 1956), East German sprint canoeist
- Friedrich Olbricht (1888–1944), German general during World War II
- Thomas H. Olbricht (1929–2020), American religion academic

== See also ==
- Olbrich
