= Profilo =

Turkish company

- Founded: 1977; 49 years ago in Turkey
- Headquarters: Turkey
- Brands: Profilo Shopping Center; Profilo Telra
- Owner: Jak Kamhi
- Website: www.profilo.com

Profilo Durable Household Appliances, or shortly Profilo, is a Turkish white goods and electronic products manufacturer founded in Istanbul in 1976. It is included in the BSH group.

It was founded by the famous Jewish Turkish businessman Jak Kamhi. Since 1995, it has been operating under BSH. White goods, built-in appliances, vacuum cleaners, air conditioners, water heaters and small household appliances constitute the main product network.

== See also ==
- BSH group
