= Surp Agop Hospital =

Hospital in Istanbul, Turkey

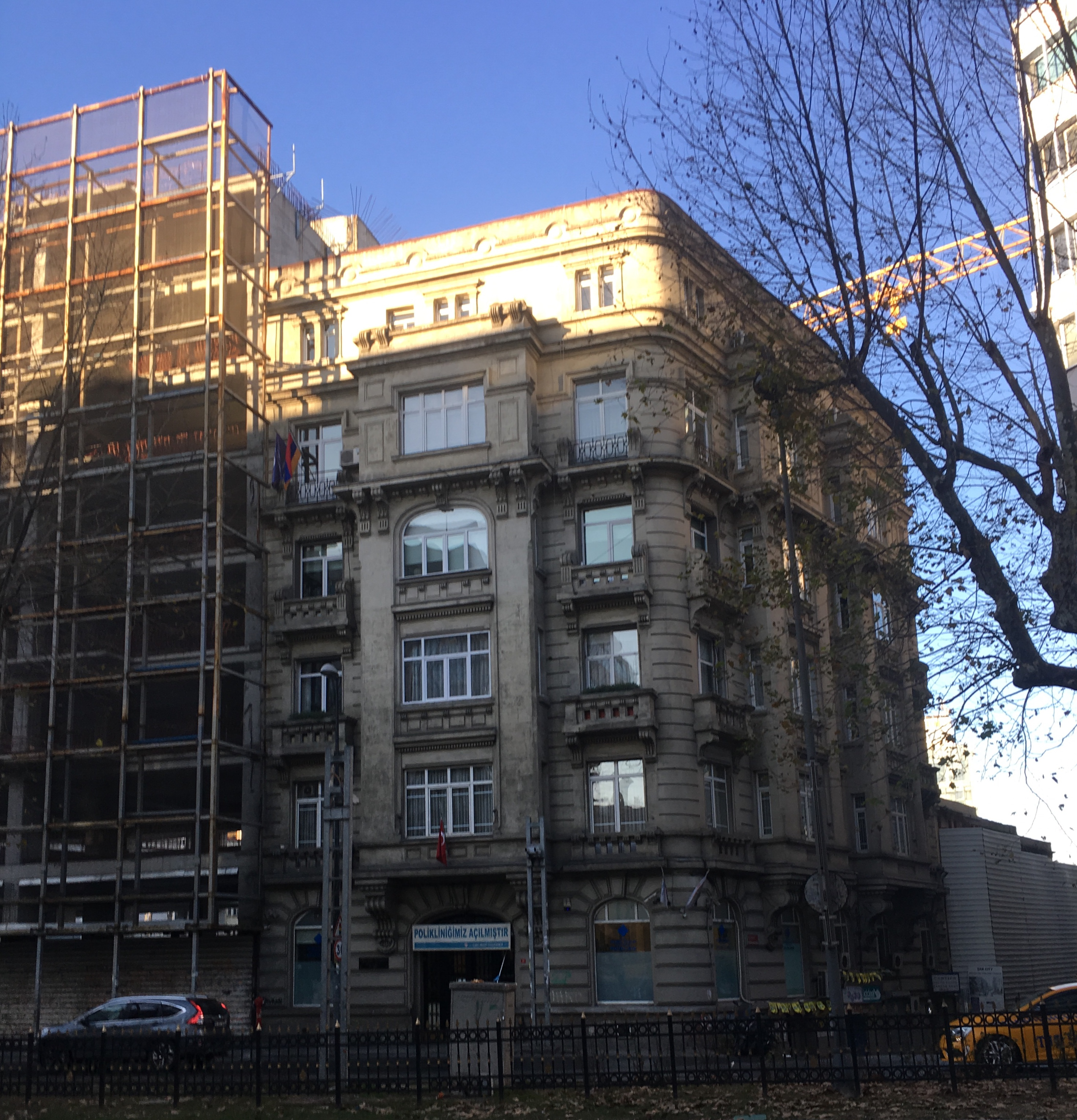
- Exterior view of Surp Agop Hospital, January 2020

Geography
- Location: Elmadağ, Şişli, Istanbul, Turkey
- Coordinates: 41°02′28″N 28°59′08″E

Organisation
- Religious affiliation: Catholic church

History
- Former names: Saint Jacob Armenian Hospital, "The hospital Sourp-Agop of Pancaldi above Pera.
- Opened: 1837

Links
- Lists: Hospitals in Turkey

Surp Agop Hospital (Turkish: Surp Agop Hastanesi) or Saint Jacob Armenian Hospital is a hospital in the Elmadağ neighborhood of Şişli district of Istanbul which was established in 1837 and continues to be operated by the Armenian Catholic community of Turkey. The hospital also owned all rights of the Pangaltı Armenian Cemetery which was destroyed in the 1930s.

The hospital was widely noted before and after World War I for its work. Using the names of the districts of the time it was known as "The hospital Sourp-Agop of Pancaldi above Pera." Armenian fundraising for the hospital continued after World War II. Today it is a private hospital which caters also to the Turkish Social Security Agency (Sosyal Güvenlik Kurumu - SGK) continuing to serve the public in Istanbul.
