= Istanbul Congress Center =

Convention center in Istanbul, Turkey

- İstanbul Kongre Merkezi
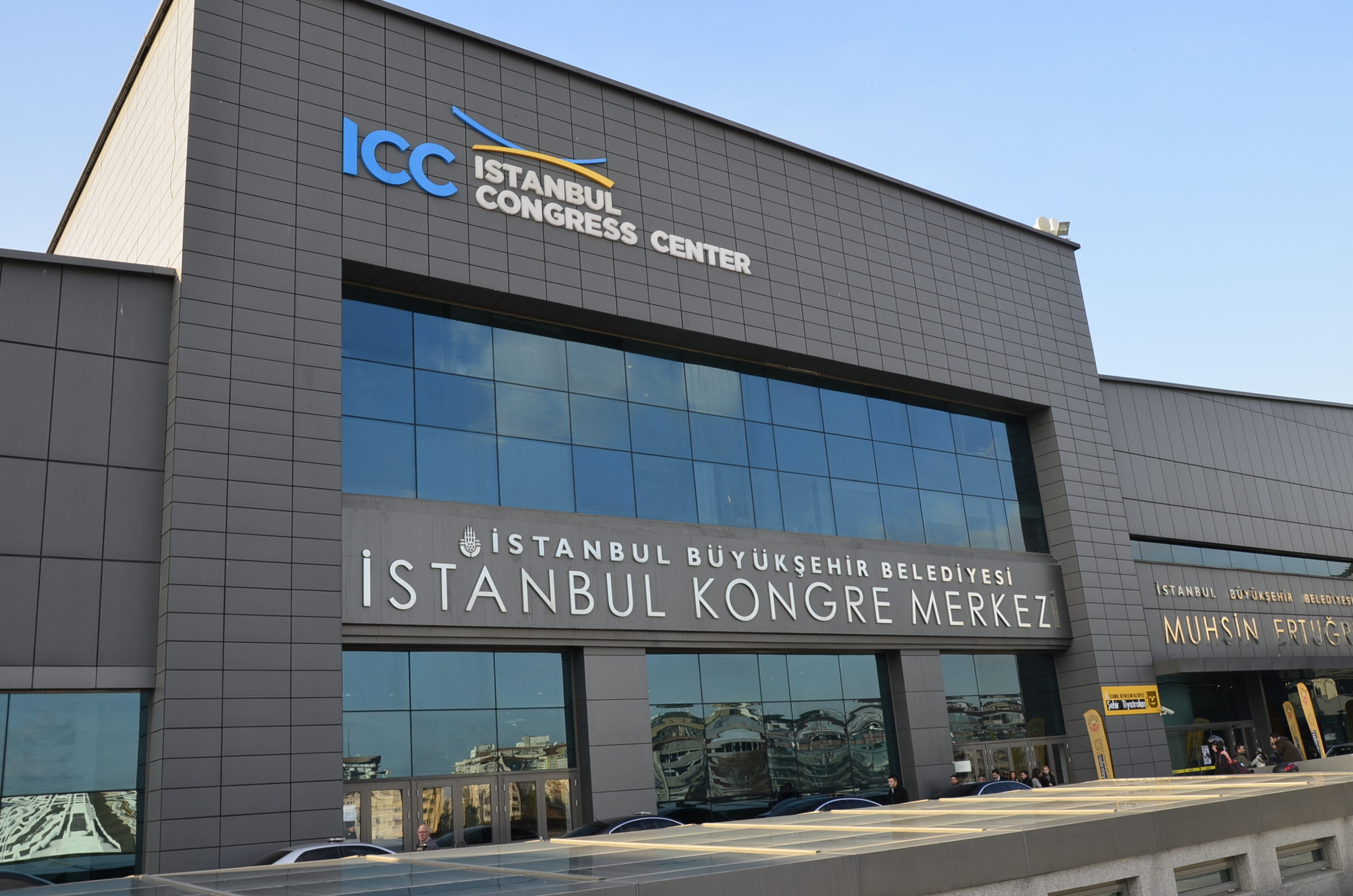
- Istanbul Congress Center.

- Location within Istanbul

General information
- Location: Harbiye, Şişli, Istanbul, Turkey
- Coordinates: 41°02′45″N 28°59′18″E
- Opened: October 17, 2009; 16 years ago
- Owner: Istanbul Metropolitan Municipality

Website
- www.iccistanbul.com

Istanbul Congress Center (ICC; Turkish: İstanbul Kongre Merkezi) is a convention center located at Harbiye neighborhood of Şişli district in Istanbul, Turkey. Opened on October 17, 2009, it is owned by Istanbul Metropolitan Municipality.

Situated adjacent to Harbiye Muhsin Ertuğrul Stage, it is a multi-level complex, which was built to host the 2009 IMF and World Bank Group Annual Meeting. The building has a foyer at ground level, several meeting halls in different sizes in five underground levels and a car park in the lowest two levels.

== Facilities ==
At the first basement level B1, there are seven meeting halls of a total area 509 m^{2} (5,480 sq ft) and total seating capacity of 488 people. The congress center's biggest meeting space with an area of 3,028 m^{2} (32,590 sq ft) and 2,192 to 3,705-person seating capacity, the Harbiye Hall, occupies three levels. Its entrance is situated at level B2. The level B2 hosts another eight halls in sizes ranging between 87–1,300 m^{2} (940–13,990 sq ft) with seating capacities from 104 to 1,404. Four of these halls are divisible in two or three smaller spaces by soundproof panels. The basement level B3 holds a total of 90 smaller rooms for workshop meetings in the range of 20–100 m^{2} (220–1,080 sq ft). The levels B4 and B5 are exhibition halls in the sizes of 4,278 m^{2} (46,050 sq ft) and 5,753 m^{2} (61,920 sq ft) with 4.00 m (13.12 ft) ceiling height as well as another bigger one of 6,065 m^{2} (65,280 sq ft) with 7.20 m (23.6 ft).

The levels B6 and B7 are designed as car park capable of 850 vehicles in total. The center is connected with a passage to Istanbul Lütfi Kırdar Convention and Exhibition Center across the street, which is closed to traffic.

== Notable events ==
- 2009 IMF and World Bank Group Annual Meeting
- 2013 Turkey Innovation Week
- 2014 7th World Congress on Pediatric Intensive and Critical Care
- 2015 ABU TV Song Festival
- 2015 ACI AIRPORT EXCHANGE, hosted by İGA Havalimanı İşletmesi A.Ş
- 2023 Ethereum Devconnect, hosted by the DevCon team

== See also ==
- Istanbul Lütfi Kırdar Convention and Exhibition Center
