= Divan Group =

- Industry: Hotel management
- Genre: Hotels
- Founded: 1956
- Founder: Vehbi Koç
- Headquarters: Taksim Gezi Park, Elmadağ, Şişli, Istanbul
- Area served: Worldwide
- Revenue: US$114.63 million (2023)
- Parent: Koç family
- Website: www.divan.com.tr

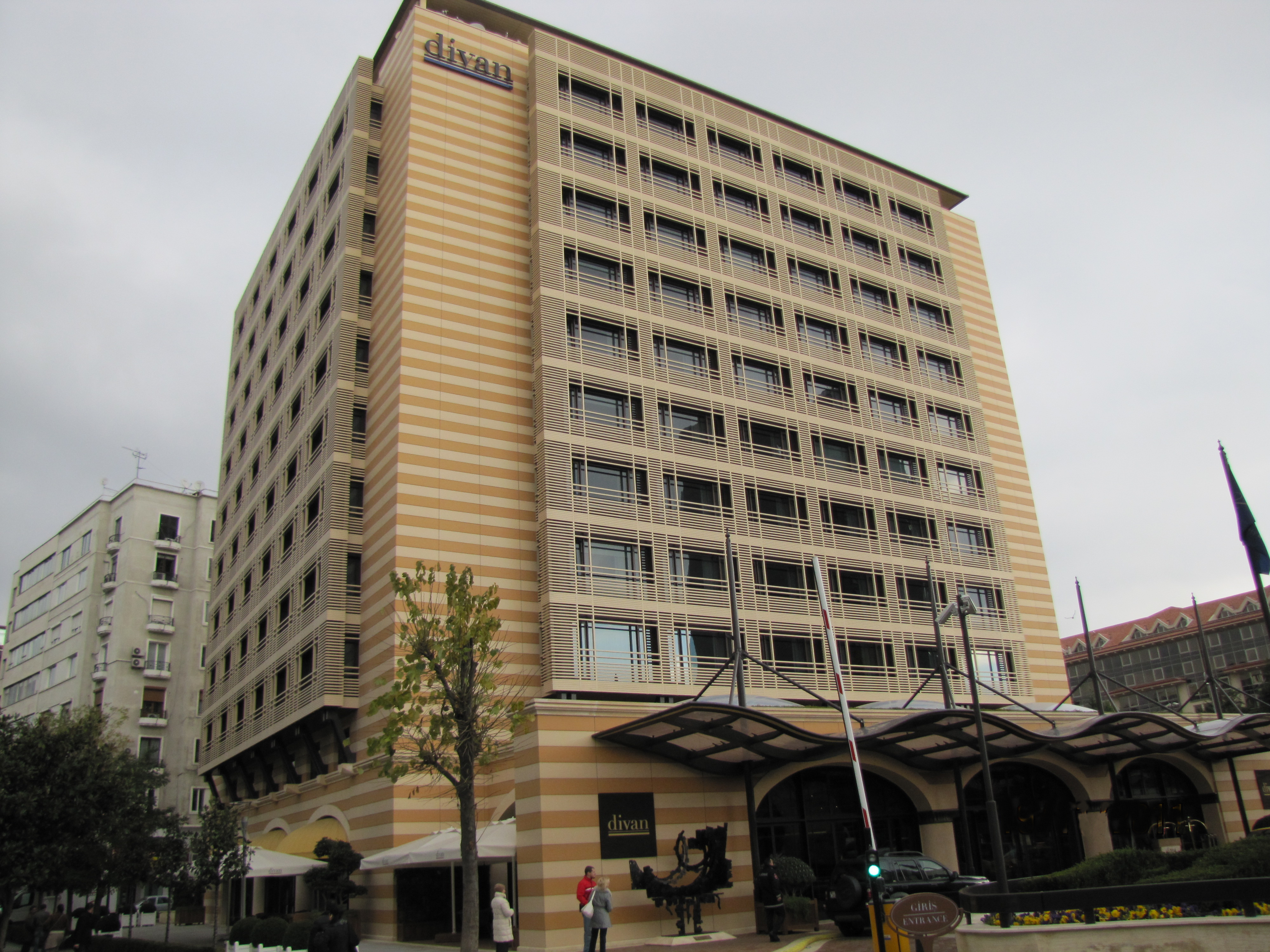
Divan Istanbul in Elmadağ, Şişli, Istanbul, next to Taksim Gezi Park

Divan Group is a hotel group based in Turkey; its flagship is the Divan Istanbul next to Taksim Gezi Park. Founded in 1956, it is part of the Koç family's Koç Holding. In 2015 the Group had 15 hotels in Turkey, Iraq, Azerbaijan, and Georgia, with 6 more hotels in pipeline and plans to expand overseas to locations including New York City and London. It is affiliated to the Preferred Hotel Group.

The Group also includes Divan Residence (apartment management) and Divan Patisseries.
