= Hilton Istanbul Bosphorus =

Five star hotel in Istanbul, Turkey

Coordinates: 41.0445°N 28.9891°E

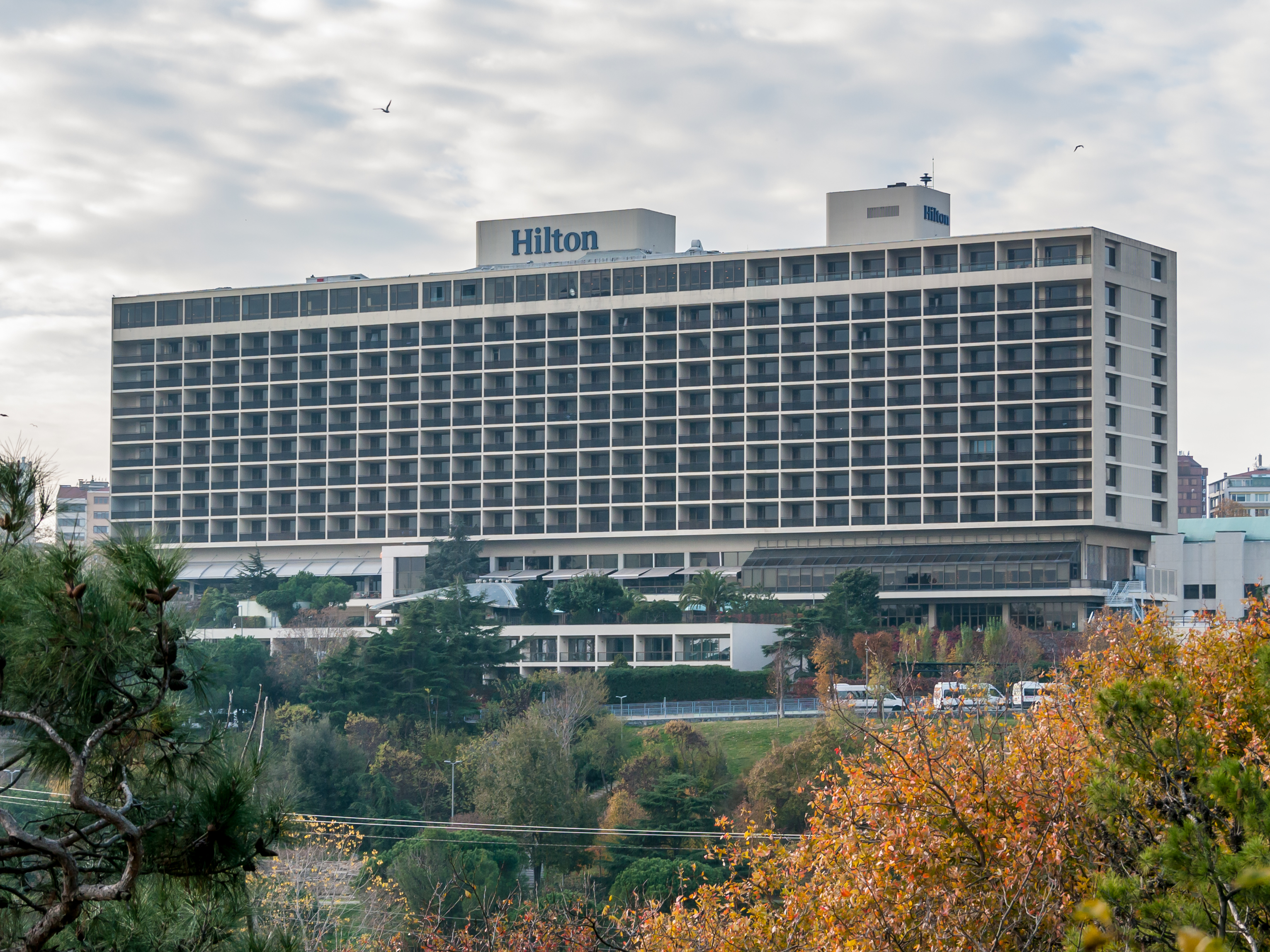
- Hilton Istanbul Bosphorus (2019)

General information
- Classification: 5 stars
- Location: Cumhuriyet Cad., Elmadağ, Şişli, Istanbul, Turkey
- Opening: June 10, 1955; 71 years ago
- Owner: Emekli Sandığı (Pension Fund)
- Operator: Hilton Hotels

Technical details
- Floor count: 11

Design and construction
- Architects: Skidmore, Owings and Merrill (SOM), USA; Sedat Hakkı Eldem, Gordon Bunshaft

Other information
- Number of rooms: 499
- Number of suites: 13
- Number of restaurants: 6

Website
- https://www.hilton.com/en/hotels/isthitw-hilton-istanbul-bosphorus/

The Hilton Istanbul Bosphorus (Turkish: Hilton İstanbul Bosphorus) is a five-star hotel in Istanbul, Turkey. Designed by Skidmore, Owings & Merrill, it opened in 1955 as the Istanbul Hilton and is the longest operating Hilton Hotel outside the United States.

== Project ==
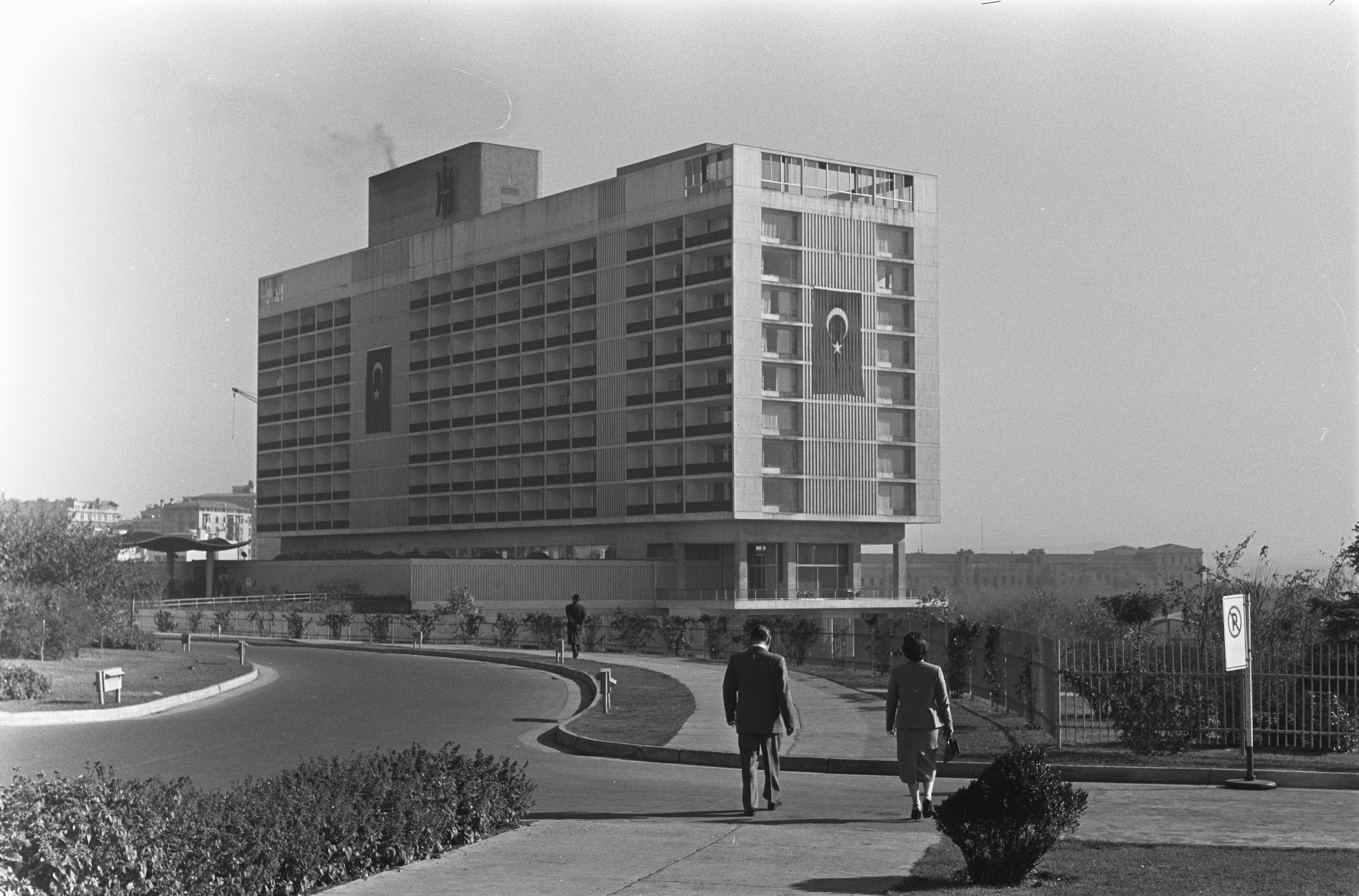
The original Istanbul Hilton, before later additions, on Republic Day 1959

On December 19, 1950, Conrad N. Hilton revealed to the New York Times that he had recently reached an agreement with the Turkish government to build a new Hilton hotel in Istanbul with 300 rooms costing a total of US$5 million. The U.S. governmental agency Economic Cooperation Administration (ECA) was the main financier of an investment project. Hilton would raise the operation's capital and run the hotels while keeping one third of the profits.

At the time, Istanbul was growing in tourism, economy, and commerce. The total number of rooms in Istanbul conforming to internationally acceptable comfort standards was 290. The project would more than double the city's accommodation capacity at the international level.

John Wilson Houser, vice-president of Hilton International, wrote a letter to Conrad N. Hilton on June 23, 1951 about the Soviet Union's intention to build a 1,000-room hotel in Istanbul similar to the Waldorf-Astoria Hotel in New York City, plans of which he had seen. The Istanbul Hilton project thus became a factor in the Cold War US–Soviet rivalry.

The final contract between the Turkish Government and Hilton Hotels was signed on August 9, 1951. The necessary land and US$3 million of the investment capital were provided by Emekli Sandigi, the Turkish Pension Fund, and the remaining US$2 million by the ECA. Hilton International secured the initial operating rights for 20 years.

While being financed by Emekli Sandigi, which was the Turkish Pension Fund, and the U.S government through the Economic Cooperation Administration, securing this funding had called for other projects like The Park hotel of Istanbul, a subsidiary of Pan Am, and the Inter-Continental Hotels Cooperation to be bypassed.

== Architecture and construction ==
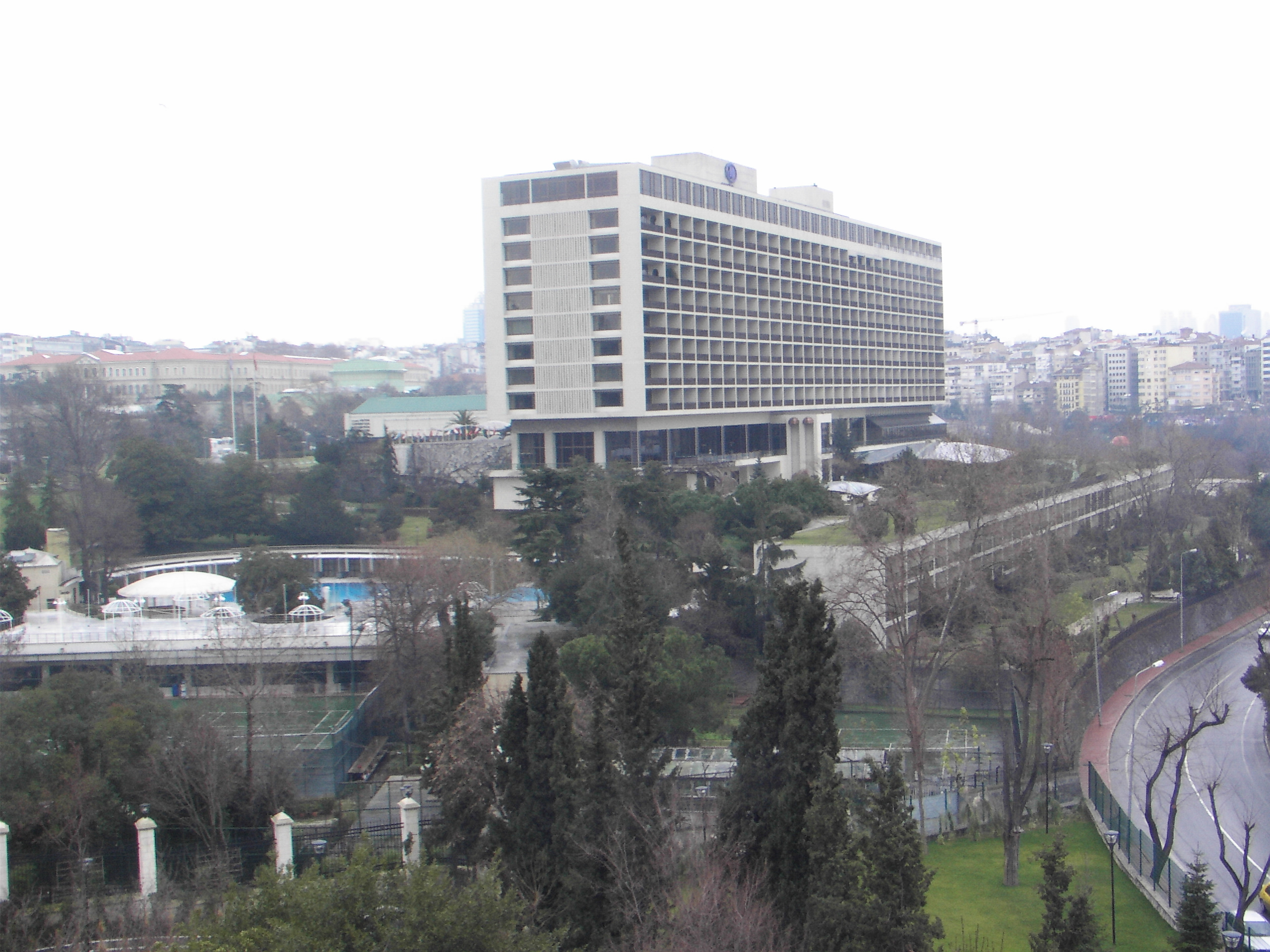
Hilton Istanbul Bosphorus Hotel seen from south (2007)

The hotel was designed by the American architectural and engineering firm Skidmore, Owings and Merrill (SOM). Turkish architect Sedat Hakkı Eldem was appointed as an advisor. The design of the Istanbul Hilton was a joint collaboration by Sedat Hakkı Eldem (Turkish architect) and Gordon Bunshaft. They both come from the American firm called SOM.

The Istanbul Hilton was built upon the confiscated property of a former Armenian cemetery. The groundbreaking took place in the summer of 1952. German company Dyckerhoff, Widmann & Julius Berger was signed for the construction. The labor at the construction site was carried out by about 500 Turkish workers and engineers. White Portland cement, glass and structural steel came from Germany, marble and ceramic fittings from Italy, and aluminium window castings, air-conditioning units and elevators from the United States.

The eleven-story building, in the form of a rectangular prism with dimensions of 21 m × 100 m (69 ft × 328 ft), represents modern architecture. The building was erected on a green hillside with a panoramic view of the Bosphorus and is very close to the busy Taksim Square. The building is a combination of the modern lines of Gordon Bunshaft with the rich artistic and romantic elements of Ottoman and Turkish architecture, implemented by its architect, Sedat Hakkı Eldem. As an example of Orientalism, the roof of the main entrance, designed by Eldem, resembles a flying carpet. The decorative tiles came from Kütahya, and the carpets for the rooms covering 12,500 m^{2} (135,000 sq ft) were woven in Konya by hand.

After completing the construction work in a record time of 21 months, the hotel became the largest in Eastern Europe and the Middle East.

The hotel was temporarily opened on May 20, 1955. The official opening of the Istanbul Hilton took place in a ceremony on June 10, 1955 in presence of Conrad N. Hilton, Fahrettin Kerim Gökay, Governor and Mayor of Istanbul, as well as American guests and celebrities, who came the day before on a chartered flight. Among them were Terry Moore, Olivia de Havilland, Mona Freeman, Irene Dunne, Sonja Henie, Diana Lynn, Merle Oberon, Ann Miller, Lon McCallister, Keefe Brasselle, Leo Carrillo, and Elaine Shepard.

== Rooms, restaurants and facilities ==
The Hilton Istanbul Bosphorus contains 499 rooms of 5 m × 6 m (16 ft × 20 ft), each with a private balcony. In addition, the hotel offers 158 executive rooms and 13 suites. Restaurants at the hotel offer various dishes such as Indian cuisine, "Veranda Grill & Bar" for organic food and fish, "Bosphorus Terrace", "Lobby Lounge & Bar", "Pool Café" and "Dragon" which offers classical Chinese cuisine. Further facilities of the hotel are a "Turkish bath" (currently closed for refurbishment), Jacuzzi, sauna and steam room for relaxing.

== Special events and projects ==
The award ceremony by the 40th Istanbul film festival which had been put together by the Istanbul Foundation for culture and arts along with tourism ministry and the contributions of the culture, had been held at the Hilton Istanbul Bosphorus. It was in fact closed with this ceremony that was held at the Hilton Istanbul Bosphorus. Before the Covid-19 pandemic had sprung, There was a project initiated by the Hilton Istanbul Bosphorus Hotel in 2018, titled “Yerel Mutfak-Global Lezzet,” which translates to “Local Kitchens-Global Tastes.” This project was organised to support seven women organisations coming from seven regions, and seven provinces. This project was made with a goal to incorporate regional Turkish cuisines as an addition to the hotel's kitchen, adding inclusivity for international guests. They hosted many events, each time capturing a different region in their restaurant, while inviting aunties to teach the hotel's chefs the art of home cooking in the hotel kitchen. This was effective in capturing the authentic taste of their local cuisines. The main masterminds behind this project idea was Sule-Kadak, who was a communication consultant, and Ferah Diba Yağan, who was the commercial director of the Hilton Istanbul Bosphorus. This project would've served as a brilliant addition to the hotel to further incorporate regional cuisines but unfortunately had to come to a halt due to the Covid-19 pandemic.

== Notable guests ==
Hilton Istanbul Bosphorus hosted following important heads of state apart from numerous nobilities, politicians, sportspeople and celebrities:

- King Faisal II, Iraq
- King Hussein, Jordan
- Queen Elizabeth II, United Kingdom
- Charles de Gaulle, France
- Muhammad Zia-ul-Haq, Pakistan
- Mohammad Reza Pahlavi, Iran
- Rainier III, Prince of Monaco
- George W. Bush, USA

== In popular culture ==
The hotel is recognisable in Jules Dassin's 1964 film "Topkapi", in an exterior shot that shows the hotel in which the main characters are staying as they plan their heist.
