= Olbrich =

Olbrich is a German surname. Notable people with the surname include:

- André Olbrich (born 1967), German guitarist, Blind Guardian
- Erhard Olbrich (1941–2016), German psychologist (de)
- Herbert Olbrich (1897–1976)), Luftwaffe Generalleutnant
- Johanna Olbrich (1926–2004), East German spy
- Joseph Maria Olbrich (1867–1908), Austrian architect
- Jürgen O. Olbrich (born 1955), artist (de)
- Lachlan Olbrich (born 2003), Australian basketball player
- Marina Olbrich (born 1969), Russian-born German chess player

== See also ==
- Olbrich Botanical Gardens, a botanical garden in Madison, Wisconsin, U.S.A.
- Olbricht
