= Profilo Shopping Center =

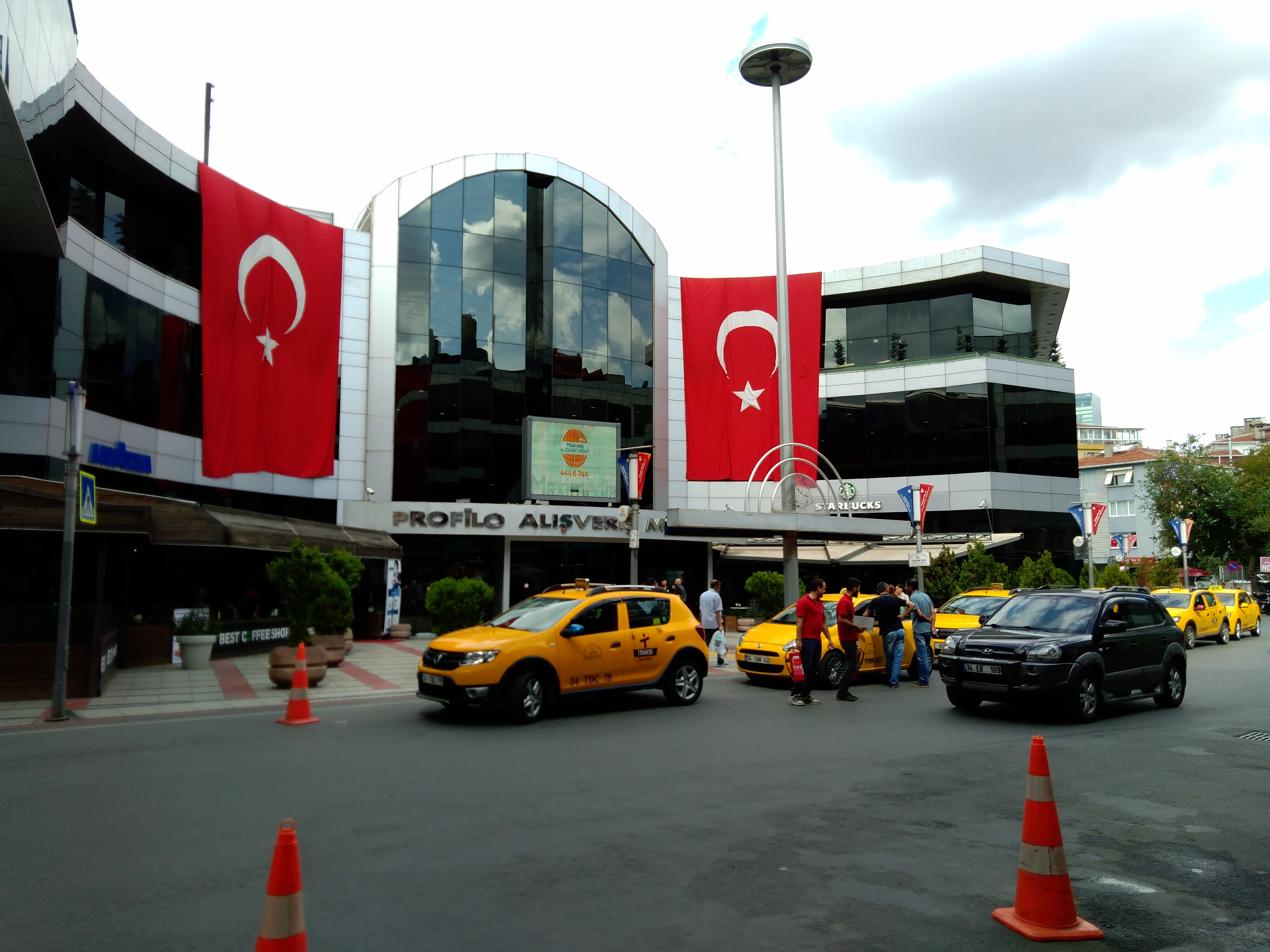
- Location: Mecidiyeköy, Istanbul, Turkey
- Coordinates: 41°04′13″N 29°00′07″E
- Opened: May 9, 1998; 28 years ago
- Closed: 2024
- Developer: Profilo Group
- Num. of stores: 239
- Num. of anchor tenants: 8
- Floor area: 15,963 m^{2} (171,820 sq ft)
- Floors: 6
- Parking: 1,500
- Website: www.pam.com.tr

Profilo Shopping Center (Turkish: Profilo Alışveriş Merkezi, PAM), was a shopping mall at Mecidiyeköy district in Istanbul. The construction of the mall began in 1995 and it was opened in 1998. Initially the site covered an area of 18.53 acres (75,000 m^{2}), later, it was expanded to 28.91 acres (117,000 m^{2}). PAM was sold to İşbank in 2021, and it was closed in 2024. The mall was demolished in the same year for a housing project.

== See also ==
- List of shopping malls in Istanbul
