= Elmadağ, Şişli =

Elmadağ
- Quarter
- Location of Şişli in Istanbul
- Coordinates: 41°03′5.94″N 28°59′15.2376″E
- Country: Turkey
- Province: Istanbul
- District: Şişli
- Time zone: GMT +2
- Area code: (+90) 212

Elmadağ is a quarter in Şişli, Istanbul, Turkey.

Among well-known buildings in the quarter are five-star hotels like Ritz-Carlton and Hilton Istanbul Bosphorus, and along Cumhuriyet Caddesi many foreign airlines have their offices. The Surp Agop (Saint Jacob) Armenian Hospital is also on the same avenue.
