= December 22 (Eastern Orthodox liturgics) =

Day in the Eastern Orthodox liturgical calendar

Eastern Orthodox liturgical calendar
December 21	December 22	December 23
December 22 O.S. ≍ January 4 N.S. December 22 N.S ≍ December 9 O.S.

An Eastern Orthodox cross

December 22 in Eastern Orthodox liturgical calendars is a feast day and a day of commemoration of saints and martyrs. Although some Orthodox churches use the Revised Julian Calendar and others use the traditional Julian calendar, the fixed commemorations for their respective December 22 are broadly the same, no matter which calendar is used. (Note: Despite the dates being the same, the days to which they refer typically differ by 13 days. The notation Old Style or O.S. is sometimes used to indicate a date in the traditional Julian Calendar (the "Old Calendar"). The notation New Style or N.S. indicates a date in the Revised Julian calendar (the "New Calendar").)

== Feasts ==
- Forefeast of the Nativity of Christ (Note: The Forefeast of the Nativity of the Lord begins on December 20. From now on, most of the liturgical hymns will be concerned with the birth of the Savior.)

== Saints ==
- Great Martyr Anastasia of Rome and Sirmium, the Deliverer from Bonds and Poisons, and:

- her teacher Martyr Chrysogonus, and with them:
- the Martyrs Theodota, Evodos (Evodus, Evodias, Evodius), (Note: Saint Evodus was the eldest son of St. Theodota. He, his mother, and his two brothers stood bravely before the judge and endured beatings without protest. After lengthy torture, they were all thrown into a fiery furnace and so received the crown of martyrdom.) Eutychianus, Zoilos, and others, (Note: One hundred and twenty men became Christians when they witnessed the miraculous deliverance of the Great Martyr Anastasia and St. Eutychianus from a sinking boat. St. Theodota appeared and steered the ship to shore. These 120 martyrs were baptized by St. Eutychianus and St. Anastasia, then were captured and put to death for confessing Christ.) who suffered under Diocletian (304)

- Hieromartyr Zoilus, Priest, under Diocletian (304) (Note: He suffered martyrdom under Diocletian, when together with the holy Virgin Martyrs Agape, Irene, and Chionia (see April 16), he recovered the relics of Saint Chrysogonous (whose memory is honored today) from the sea.)

== Pre-Schism Western saints ==
- Martyrs Demetrius, Honoratus and Florus, in Ostia in Italy (see also: November 21)
- Thirty Holy Martyrs of Rome (c. 303) (Note: A group of thirty martyrs who suffered in Rome under Diocletian and were buried on the Via Lavicana.)
- Martyr Flavian, former Prefect of Rome (362) (Note: An ex-prefect of Rome, branded on the forehead as a slave and exiled to the village of Acquapendente in Tuscany in Italy by Julian the Apostate. He reposed there while in prayer.)
- Saint Hunger (Hungerus Frisus), Bishop of Utrecht in the Netherlands from 856; during the Norman invasion he fled to Prüm in Germany where he died (866)
- Saint Amaswinthus of Málaga, Monk and Abbot for forty-two years at a monastery in Silva de Málaga in Spain (982)

== Post-Schism Orthodox saints ==
- Saint Boris Talantov of Kostroma, Soviet teacher, participant in the dissident movement in the USSR, church publicist and political prisoner (1970–1971) (Note: See also: (in Russian) Талантов, Борис Владимирович. Википедии. (Russian Wikipedia).) (Note: Boris Talantov's essay on the subject of the Russian Orthodox Church under the Communist Yoke is available at the Orthodox Christian Information Center: Boris Talantov. The Moscow Patriarchate and Sergianism. August, 1967 (Signature: B. V. Talantov).; IN: Ivan Andreyev. Russia's Catacomb Saints. Platina, CA: St. Herman of Alaska Press, 1982, 463–486. (pdf))

=== New martyrs and confessors ===
- New Hieromartyrs Dimitry (Demetrius) Kiranov, Archpriest of Yaroslavl, and Theodore Poroikov, (Note: See: (in Russian) Поройков, Фёдор Николаевич. Википедии. (Russian Wikipedia).) Archpriest of Yalta (1937–1938)

== Other commemorations ==
- Commemoration of the Thyranoixia (consecration) of the "Great Church of Christ", the Hagia Sophia.
- Repose of Monk Dositheus, hermit of the Roslavl Forests and Optina Monastery (1828)

== Icon gallery ==
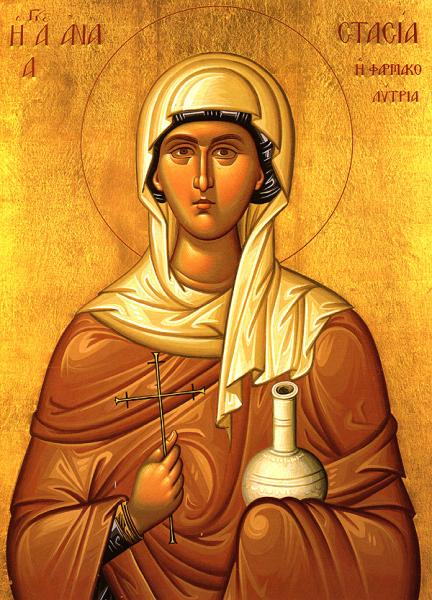
Great Martyr Anastasia, Deliverer from Bonds.

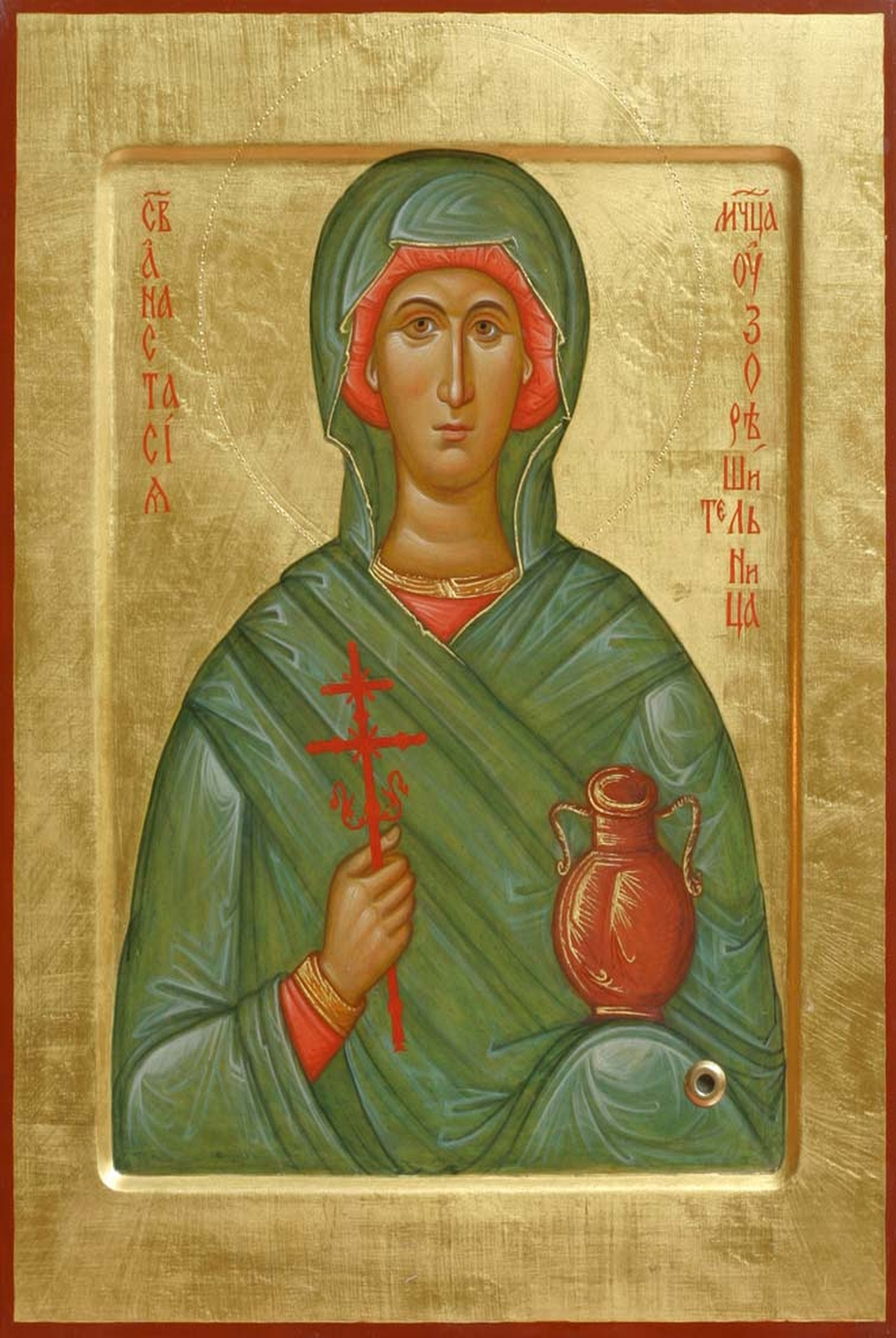
Great Martyr Anastasia, Deliverer from Bonds.

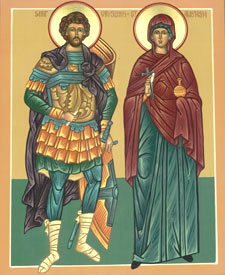
St. Chrysogonus and St. Anastasia.

Martyrdom of St. Chrysogonus.
(Menologion of Basil II, 10th century).

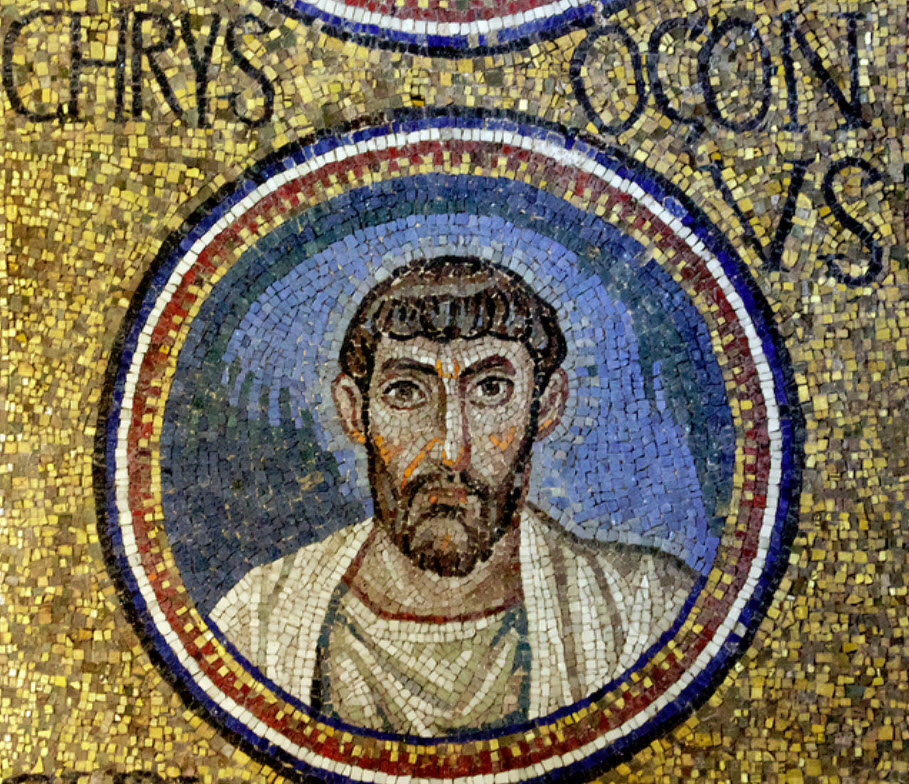
St. Chrysogonus.
(Archiepiscopal Chapel, Ravenna).

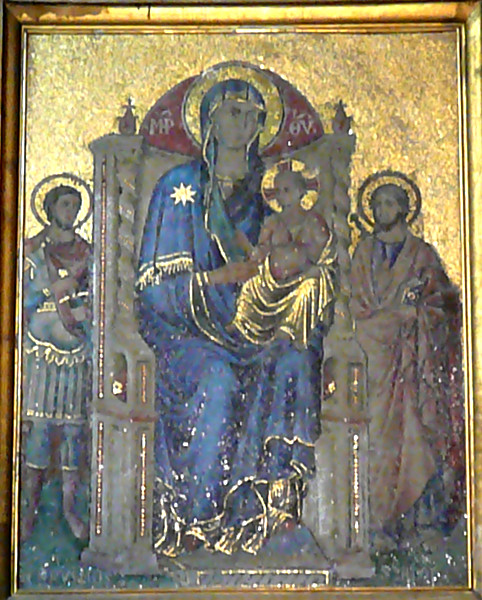
Mosaic of Virgin and Child with St. Chrysogonus (left) and St. James the Greater (right).
(Church of San Crisogono, Rome, c. 1273–1308).

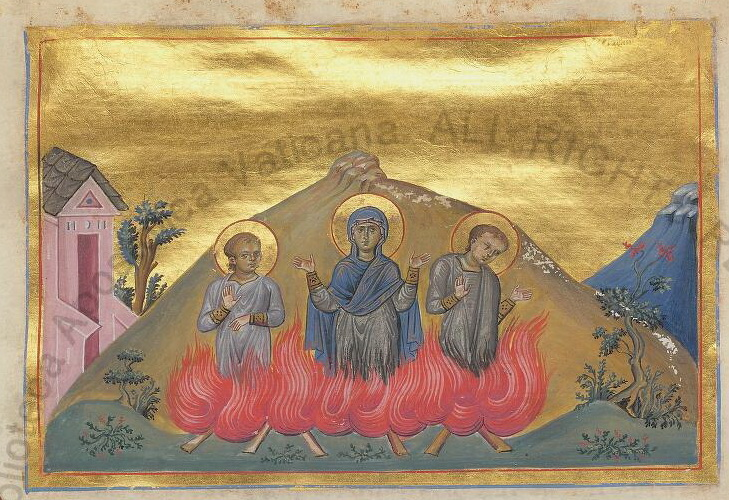
St. Theodota of Nicaea with her children.
(Menologion of Basil II, 10th century).

== Sources ==
- December 22/January 4. Orthodox Calendar (PRAVOSLAVIE.RU).
- January 4 / December 22. HOLY TRINITY RUSSIAN ORTHODOX CHURCH (A parish of the Patriarchate of Moscow).
- December 22. OCA - The Lives of the Saints.
- The Autonomous Orthodox Metropolia of Western Europe and the Americas (ROCOR). St. Hilarion Calendar of Saints for the year of our Lord 2004. St. Hilarion Press (Austin, TX). p. 1.
- December 22. Latin Saints of the Orthodox Patriarchate of Rome.
- The Roman Martyrology. Transl. by the Archbishop of Baltimore. Last Edition, According to the Copy Printed at Rome in 1914. Revised Edition, with the Imprimatur of His Eminence Cardinal Gibbons. Baltimore: John Murphy Company, 1916.

Greek Sources

- Great Synaxaristes: (in Greek) 22 ΔΕΚΕΜΒΡΙΟΥ. ΜΕΓΑΣ ΣΥΝΑΞΑΡΙΣΤΗΣ.
- (in Greek) Συναξαριστής. 22 Δεκεμβρίου. ECCLESIA.GR. (H ΕΚΚΛΗΣΙΑ ΤΗΣ ΕΛΛΑΔΟΣ).

Russian Sources

- (in Russian) 4 января (22 декабря). Православная Энциклопедия под редакцией Патриарха Московского и всея Руси Кирилла (электронная версия). (Orthodox Encyclopedia - Pravenc.ru).
- (in Russian) 22 декабря (ст.ст.) 4 января 2015 (нов. ст.). Русская Православная Церковь Отдел внешних церковных связей. (DECR).
