= Church of St. Donatus =

Church in Zadar, Croatia

Coordinates: 44°6′56.96″N 15°13′28.11″E

Church of Saint Donatus
- Crkva svetog Donata
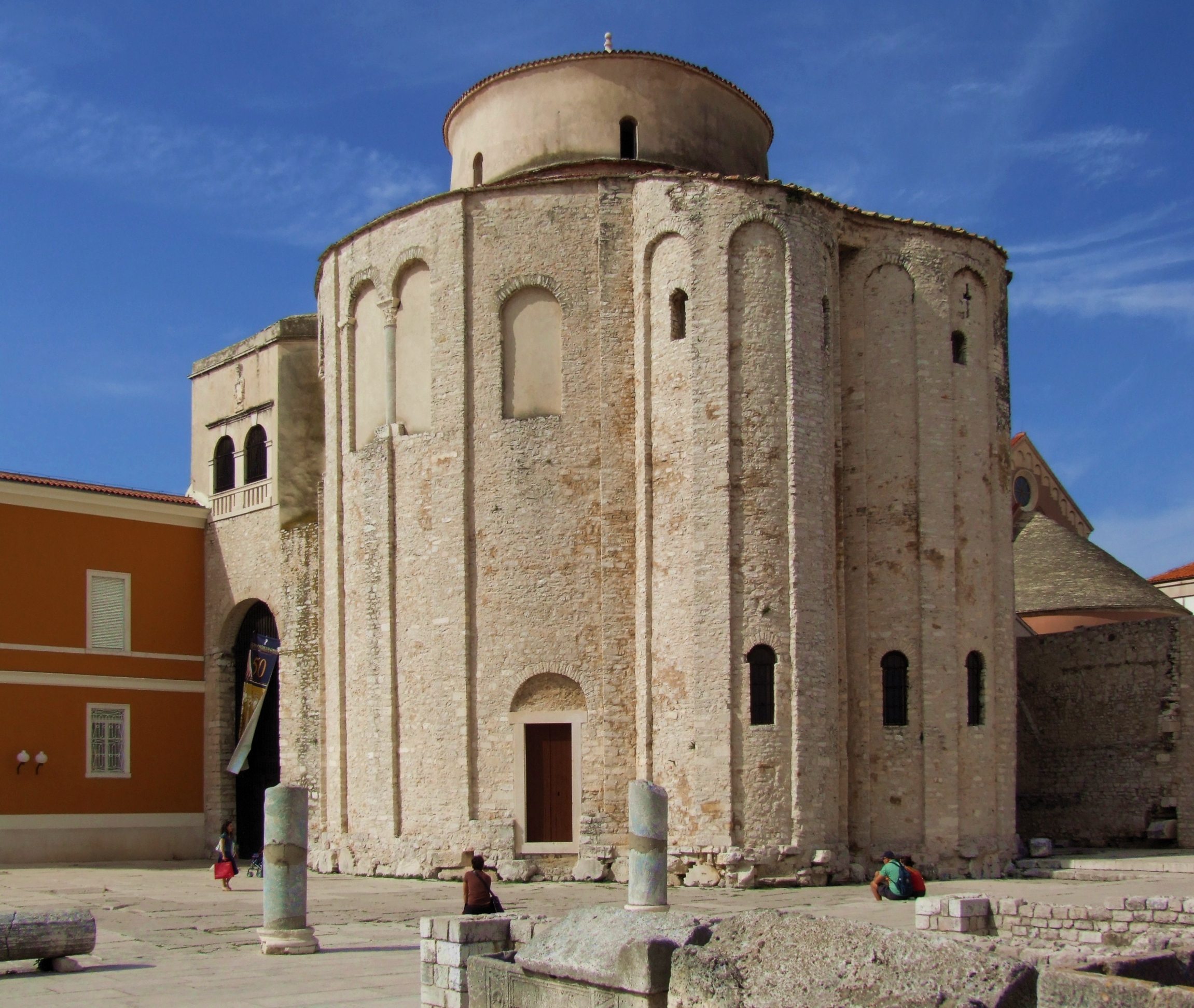
- Church of St Donatus, Zadar
- Church of Saint Donatus
- Location: Zadar, Croatia
- Country: Croatia
- Denomination: Roman Catholic

History
- Former name: Church of the Holy Trinity
- Founded: 9th century
- Founder: Donatus of Zadar

Architecture
- Style: Pre-Romanesque

The Church of St. Donatus (Croatian: Crkva sv. Donata) is a Catholic church located in Zadar, Croatia. Its name refers to Donatus of Zadar, who began construction on this church in the 9th century and ended it on the northeastern part of the Roman forum.

Originally named Church of the Holy Trinity, in the 15th century it was re-dedicated to St Donatus. The church is the largest Pre-Romanesque building in Croatia. It is also an example of the centralised type of the Carolingian period in Europe.

== History ==
The beginning of the building of the church was placed to the second half of the 8th century, and it is supposed to have been completed in the 9th century. The Zadar bishop and diplomat Donatus of Zadar (8th and 9th centuries) is credited with the building of the church. He led the representations of the Dalmatian cities to Constantinople and Charles the Great, which is why this church bears slight resemblance to Charlemagne's court chapels, especially the one in Aachen (now Aachen Cathedral), and also to the Basilica of San Vitale in Ravenna. It belongs to the Pre-Romanesque architectural period.

The circular church, formerly domed, is 27 m high and is characterised by simplicity and technical primitivism. It has three radially situated apses and an ambulatory around the central area, surmounted by circular gallery. The circular shape is typical of the early medieval age in Dalmatia. It was built on the Roman forum, and materials from buildings in the latter were used in its construction. Among the fragments which are built into the foundations it is still possible to distinguish the remains of a sacrificial altar on which is written IVNONI AVGUSTE IIOVI AVGUSTO.

The use of the church has varied during its lifetime; during the rule of the Republic of Venice it was a warehouse, as well as during the Napoleonic (French) occupation and under the Austria-Hungary. After the city was annexed to Yugoslavia, it served as an archaeological museum for a short period of time. The building is currently used as the concert venue for the annual International Festival of Medieval Renaissance Music (Musical Evenings in St Donatus) because of its acoustics.

== Gallery ==
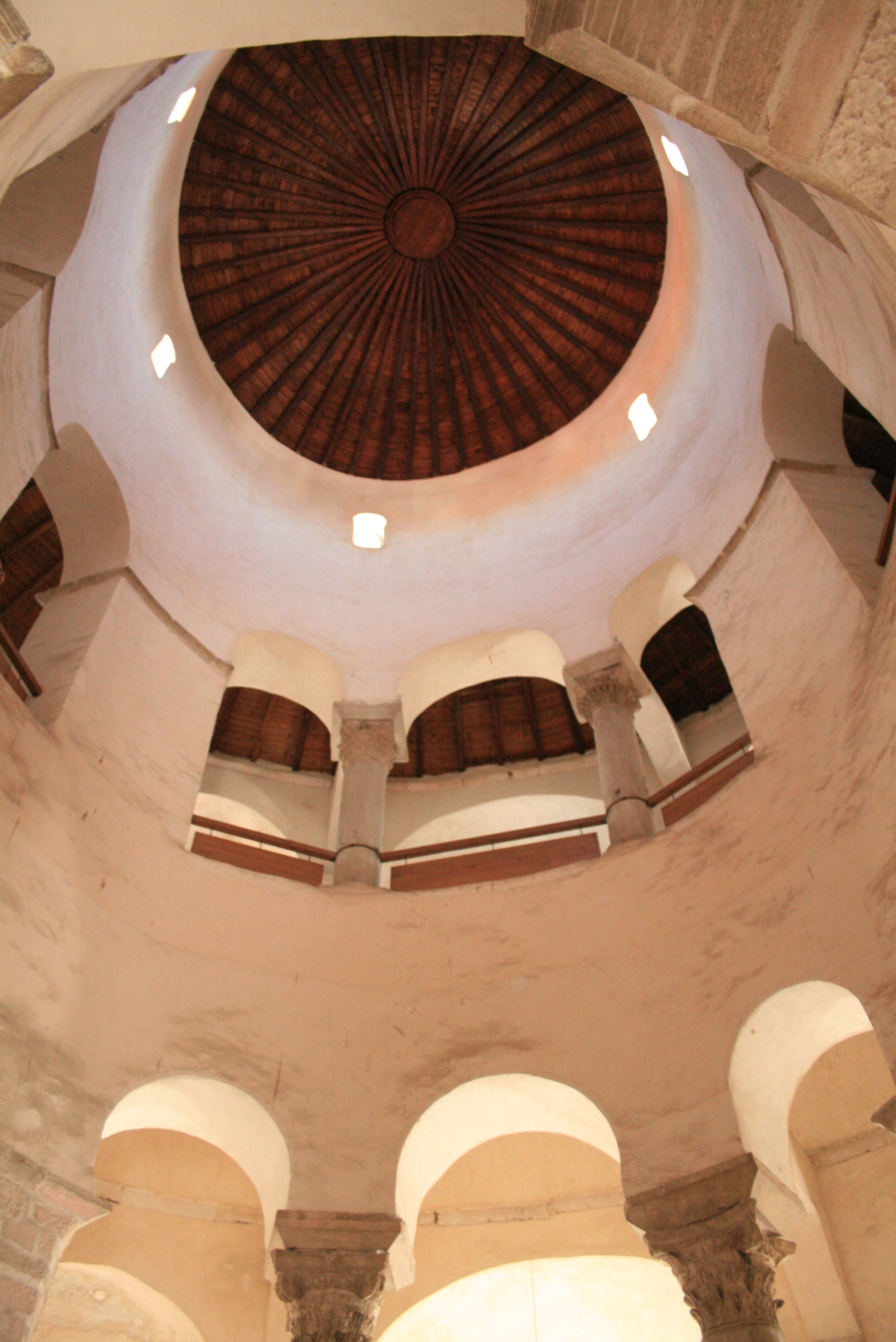
Interior

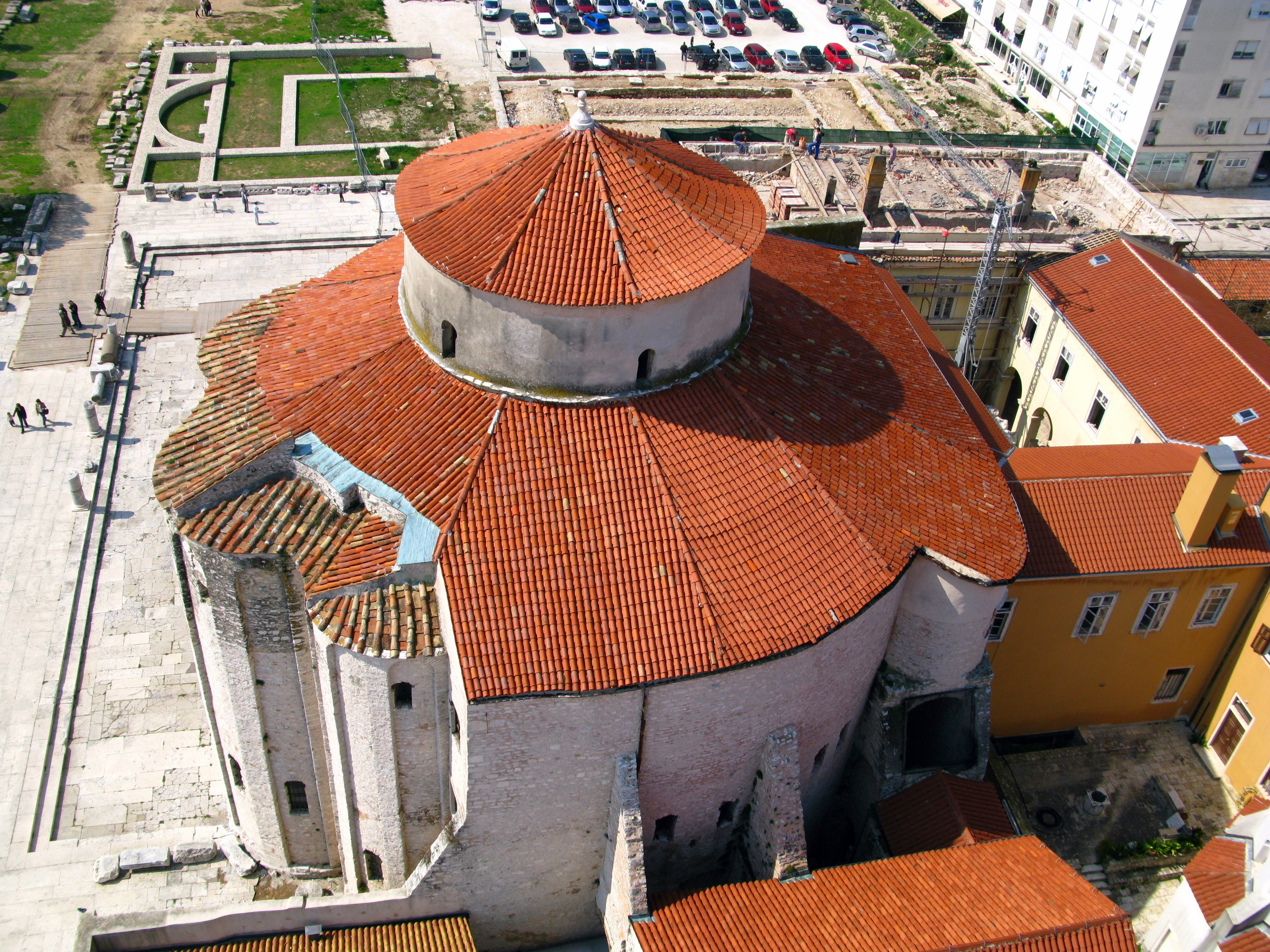
Aerial view

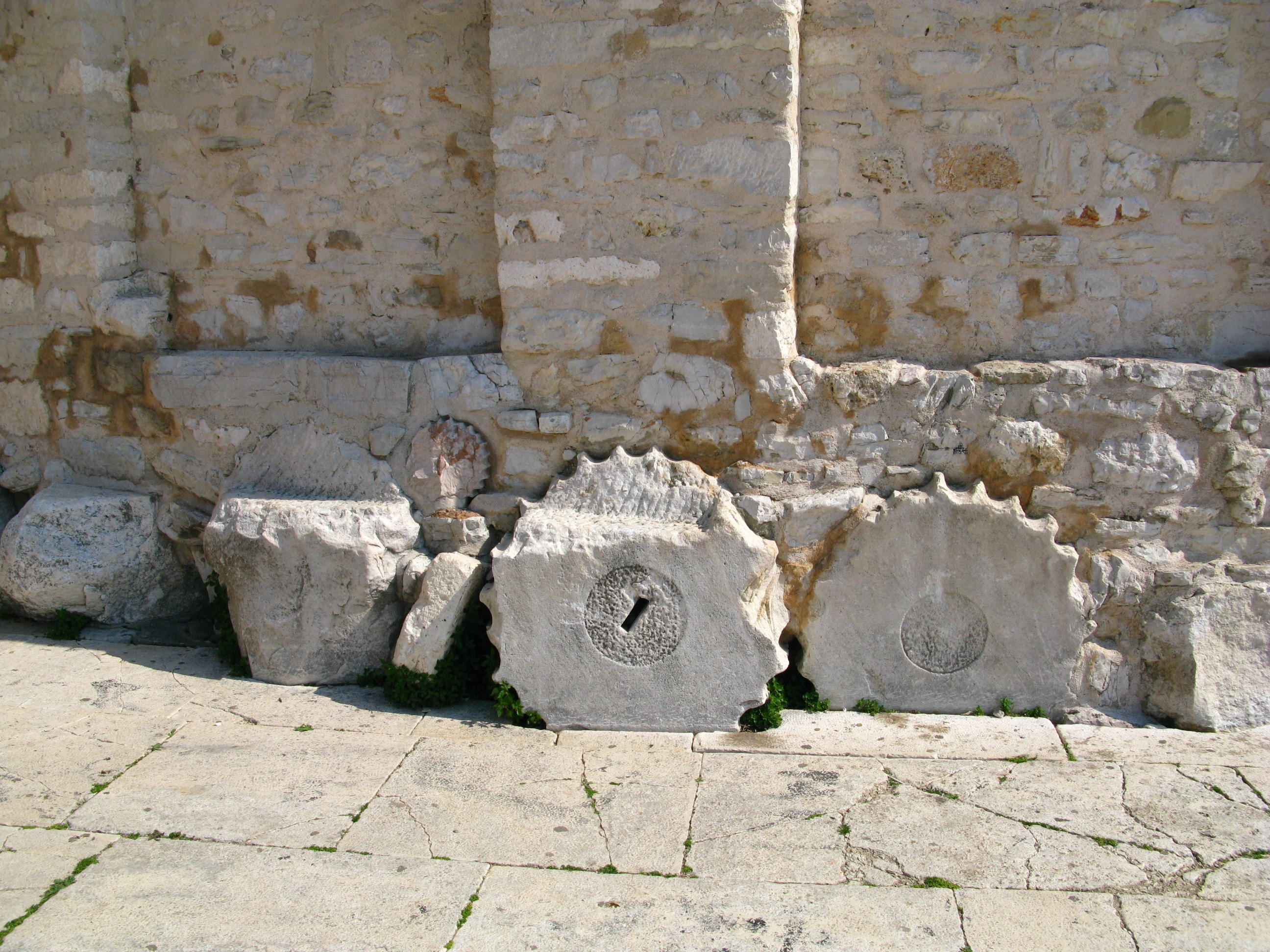
Detail

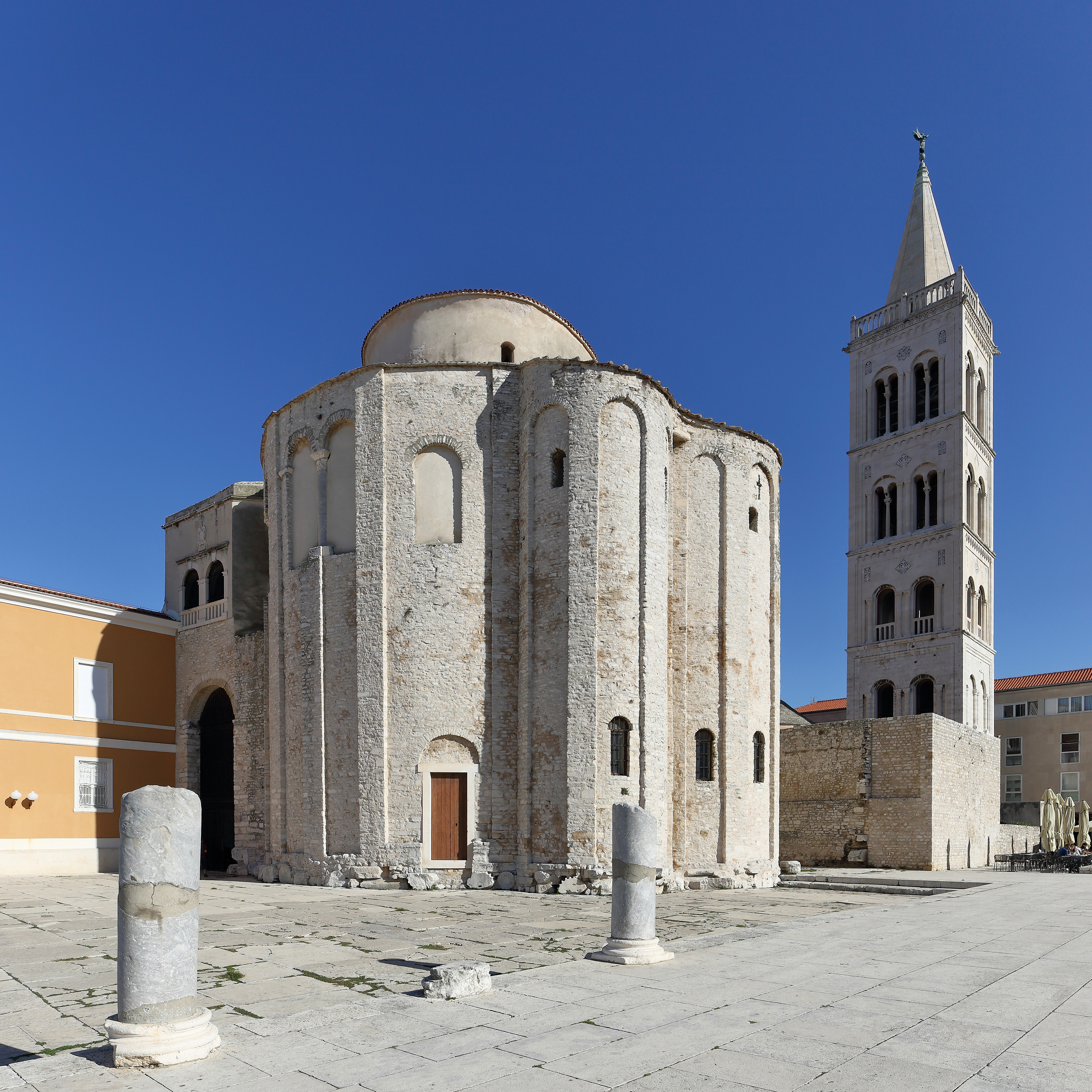
With the belltower of Zadar Cathedral

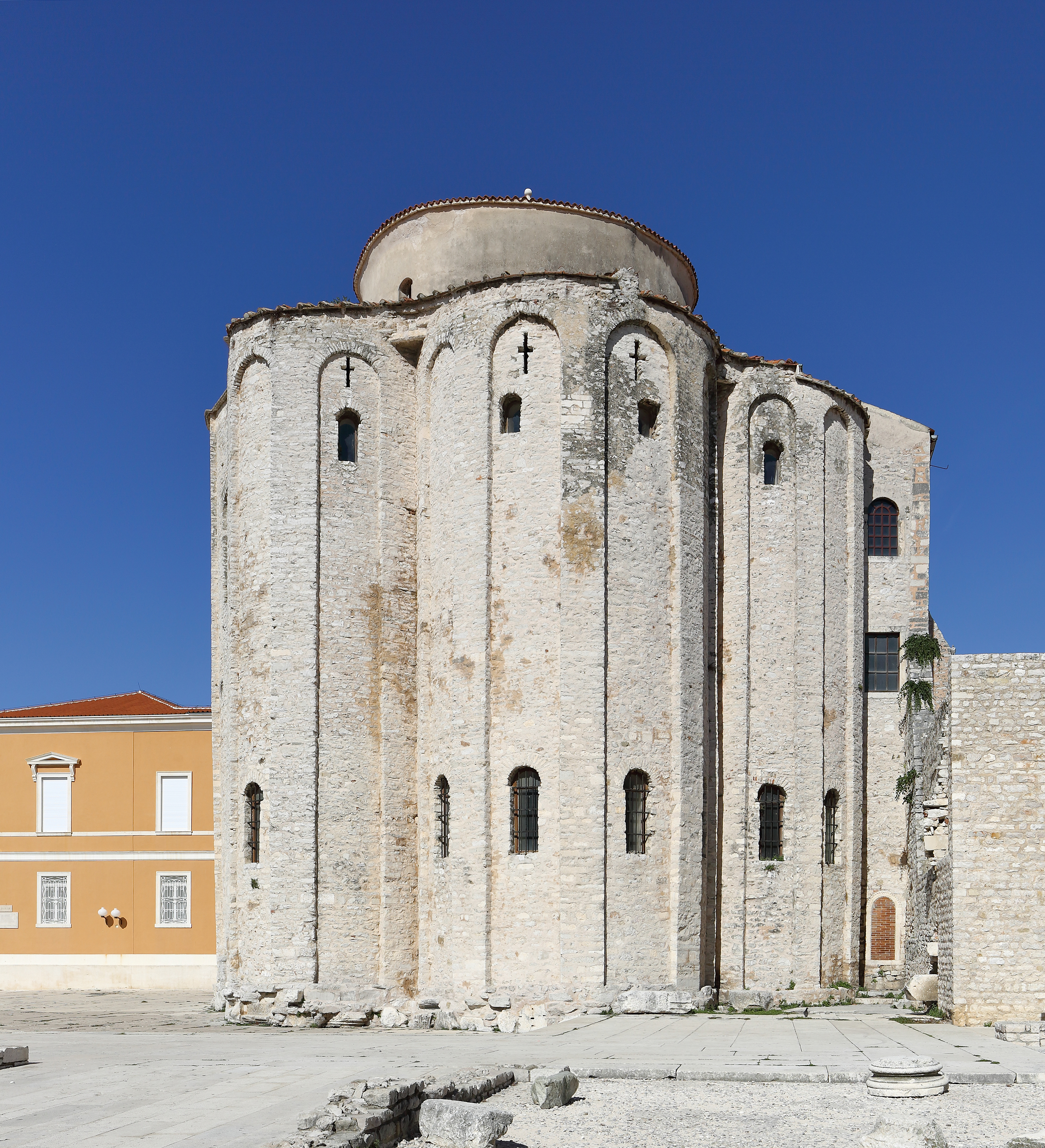
As seen in the morning

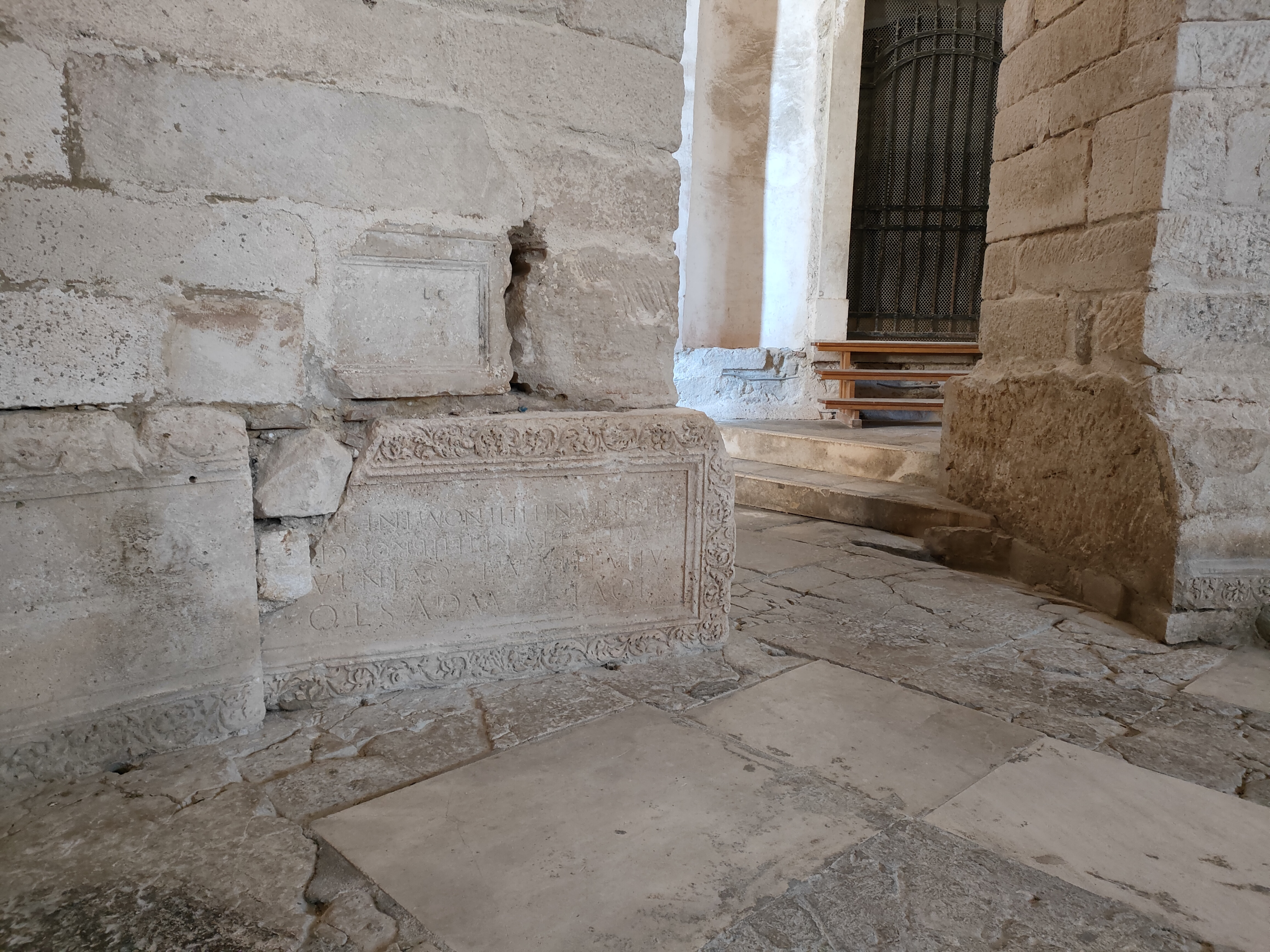
Roman temple ruins used in the foundation

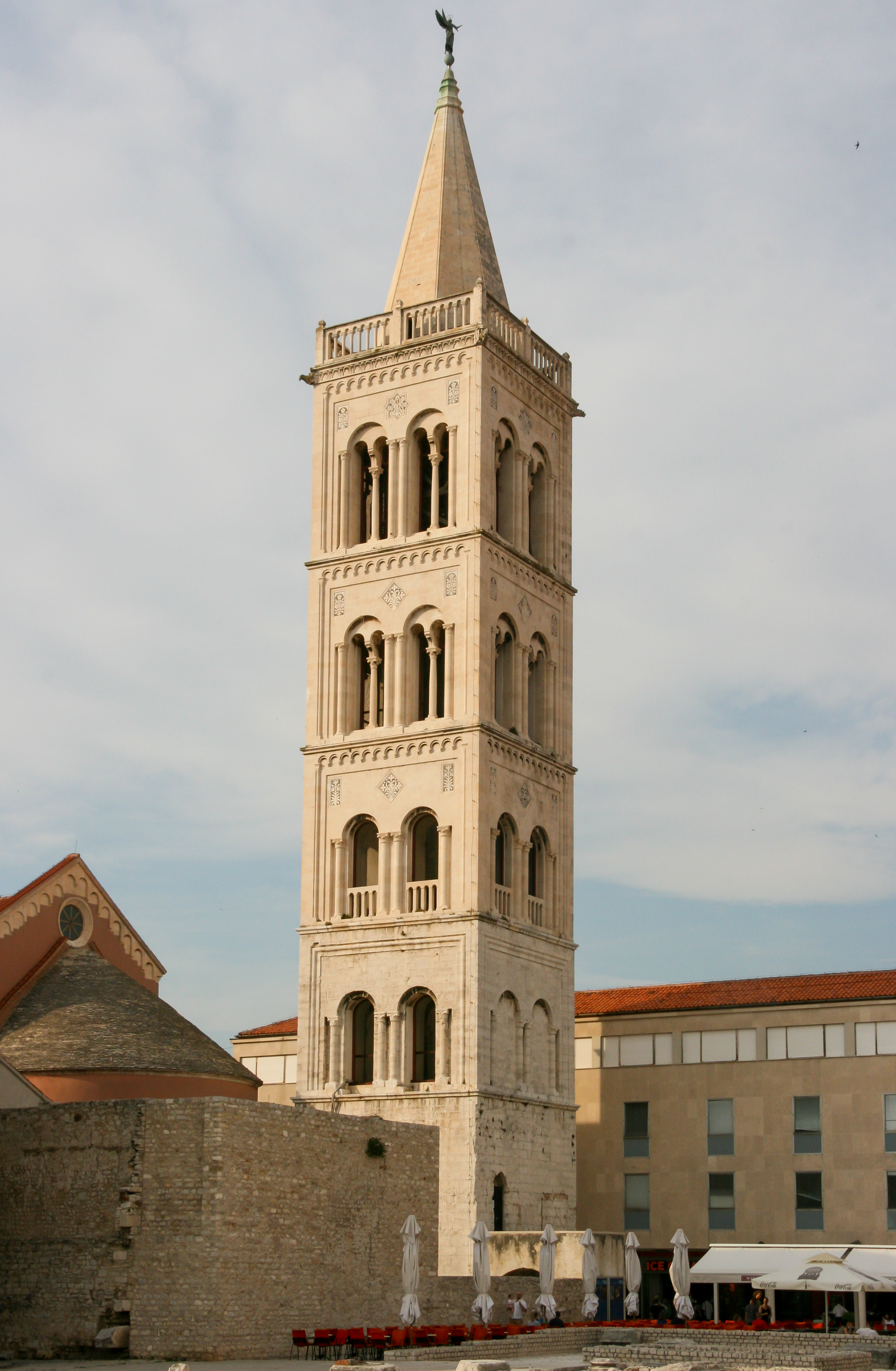
Bell tower

== See also ==
- Architecture of Croatia
- Church of Holy Salvation
- Church of Holy Cross in Nin
- Pre-Romanesque art and architecture

== Sources ==
- Damjanov, Jadranka. 1971. Likovna umjetnost 1 [Fine arts 1] (in Croatian), Školska knjiga: Zagreb. ISBN 953-0-20109-5
- Ivančević, Radovan. 1986. "Treso r Artistique de la Croatie" [Artistic treasure of Croatia], Jugoslovenska revija: Motovun.
- Karaman, Antun. 2004. Opća povijest umjetnosti [General art history] (in Croatian), Školska knjiga: Zagreb. ISBN 953-0-21319-0
