= Koksayek =

Village in Tole Bi, Kazakhstan

Coordinates: 42°15′22″N 69°58′36″E

Koksaek (Kazakh: Көксаяқ, Georgievka until 1994) is a village located in the Tole Bi District of the Turkestan region of Kazakhstan, and the administrative center of Koksaeksky rural district.

== History ==
The original village of Georgievka was founded in the 1890s along with the Church of the Great Martyr George the Victorious, erected in 1896. In 1945-1956 Georgievka was the center of the Georgievsky district. In 1994, the village was renamed Koksaek.

== Etymology ==
Many residents and historians associate the old name of the village Georgievka with the Church of the Great Martyr George the Victorious, which was built in the village at the expense of parishioners. There is also another version that the descendants of the first settlers of the village claim that there was a land surveyor Georgy, who honestly measured the land to the settlers. And as a gratitude, residents named the village after him.

== Geography ==
The village is located 40 kilometers away from the city of Shymkent. Further from Georgievka is the Kaskasu gorge with a famous mountain resort. The Sairam-su river, of glacial origin, flows through the village and originates on the northern slope of the Ugam ridge in the mountain system of the western Tian Shan.

== Demographics ==
In 2019, more than 13,000 people lived in the village. The majority of the population consists of Kazakhs, Russians and Uzbeks nations.

== Sightseeing ==
The main attraction of the village is the famous Temple of the Great Martyr George the Victorious located on the main street of the village. It gained wide popularity thanks to the life-giving source located in the immediate vicinity of the church. They say that water from the spring can cure many ailments: infertility, skin diseases and even paralysis.

In general, the dense population of immigrants from the Russian provinces during the time of the Russian Empire influenced the culture and construction of the village.

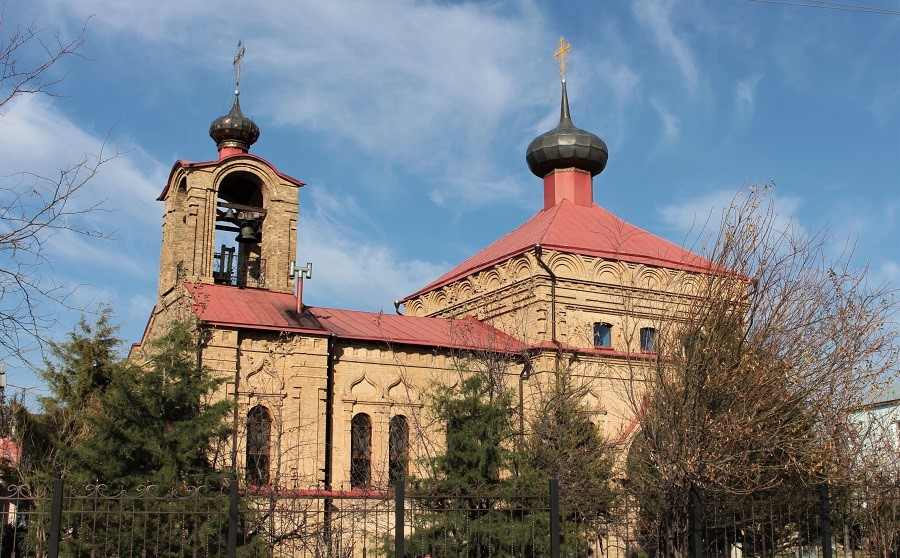
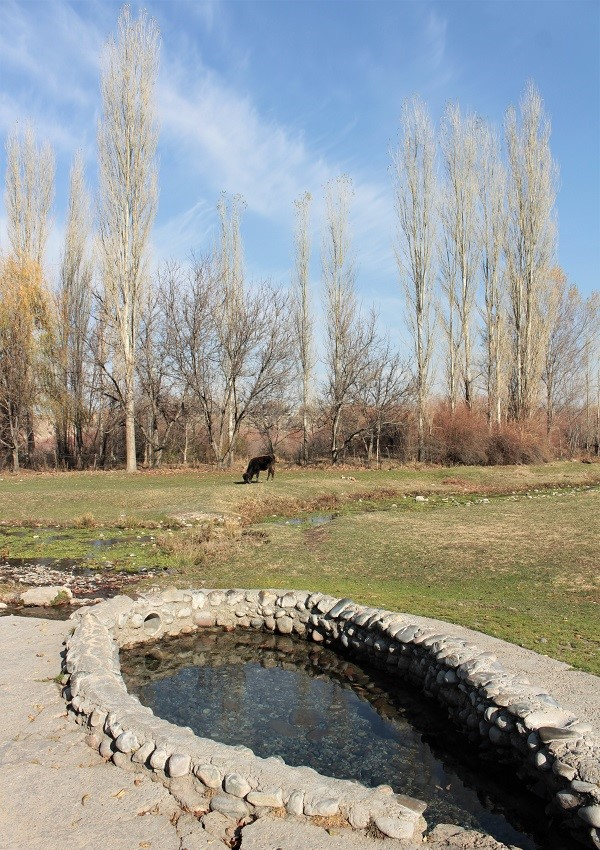

== Climate ==
The climate in the village is continental, characteristic of the entire South Kazakhstan. Winter is moderately warm - cooling down to –15 °C; and summers are hot and long, with an average temperature of 27 °C.

The village is located in a foothill strip of land well irrigated by the nearby Sairam-su river. Vegetable gardens grow in the fertile territory, and pastures are located in the high meadows. During heavy rain in the mountains, the water level in the Sairam-su river rises, and subsequently floods nearby buildings.
