= Saint Chrysogonus =

Martyr and saint, bishop of Aquileia before 302/304

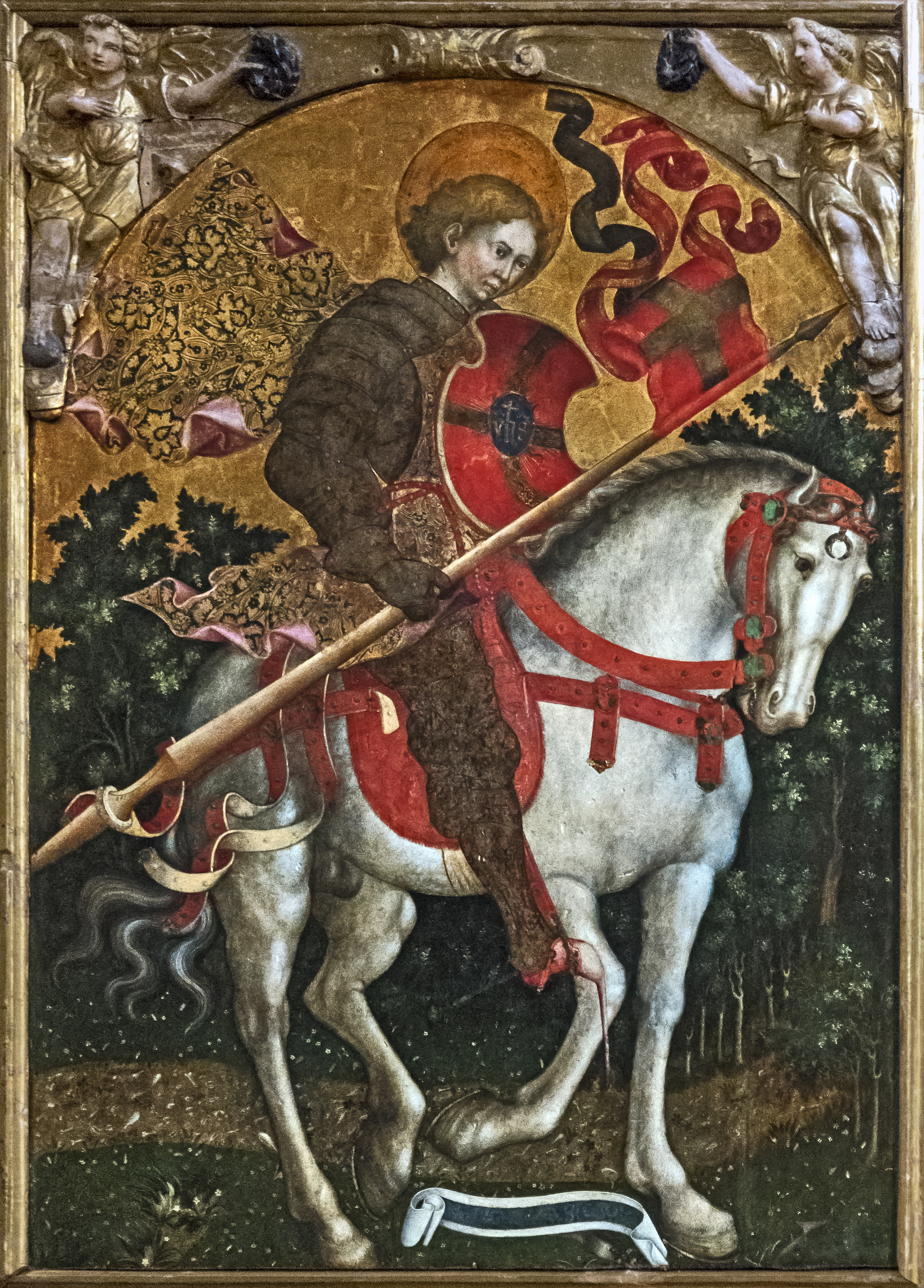
- San Crisogono, by Michele Giambono (San Trovaso, Venice)

Martyr
- Died: early 4th century Aquileia, Roman Empire (in modern Friuli-Venezia Giulia, Italy)
- Venerated in: Catholic Church; Eastern Orthodox Church
- Major shrine: San Crisogono, Rome
- Feast: 24 November (Catholic); 22 December (Orthodox)
- Attributes: Bearded young man dressed as a Roman military officer
- Patronage: Zadar

Saint Chrysogonus (Italian: San Crisogono, Croatian: Krševan) was an early Christian martyr. According to holy tradition, he was a knight in the Roman army. In exchange for abandoning Christianity, Roman emperor Diocletian offered him the position of prefect of a province. Chrysogonus declined the offer and was executed as part of the persecution.

Chrysogonus was martyred at Aquileia, probably during the Diocletianic Persecution (303–311 AD), was buried there, and publicly venerated by the faithful of that region. He is the patron saint of Zadar. His name is found in the Martyrologium Hieronymianum on two different days, 31 May and 24 November, with the topographical note "in Aquileia". The name derives from the Ancient Greek “Chrysógonos (Χρυσόγονος)”, composed of the elements: the “khrūsós (χρῡσός)” (golden, gold, something dear or precious) plus “génnēsis (γέννησις)” (birth). Thus the meaning of Chrysogonus is a dear or precious birth.

Very early indeed the veneration of this martyr of Aquileia was transferred to Rome, where in Trastevere a titular church bears his name. This church ("Titulus Chrysogoni") is first mentioned in the signatures of the Roman Synod of 499, but it probably dates from the 4th century. It is possible that the founder of the church was a certain Chrysogonus, and that, on account of the similarity of name, the church was soon devoted to the veneration of the martyr of Aquileia, In a similar way the veneration of Saint Anastasia of Sirmium was transplanted to Rome. It is also possible, however, that from the beginning, for some unknown reason, it was consecrated to Saint Chrysogonus and does take its name from him.

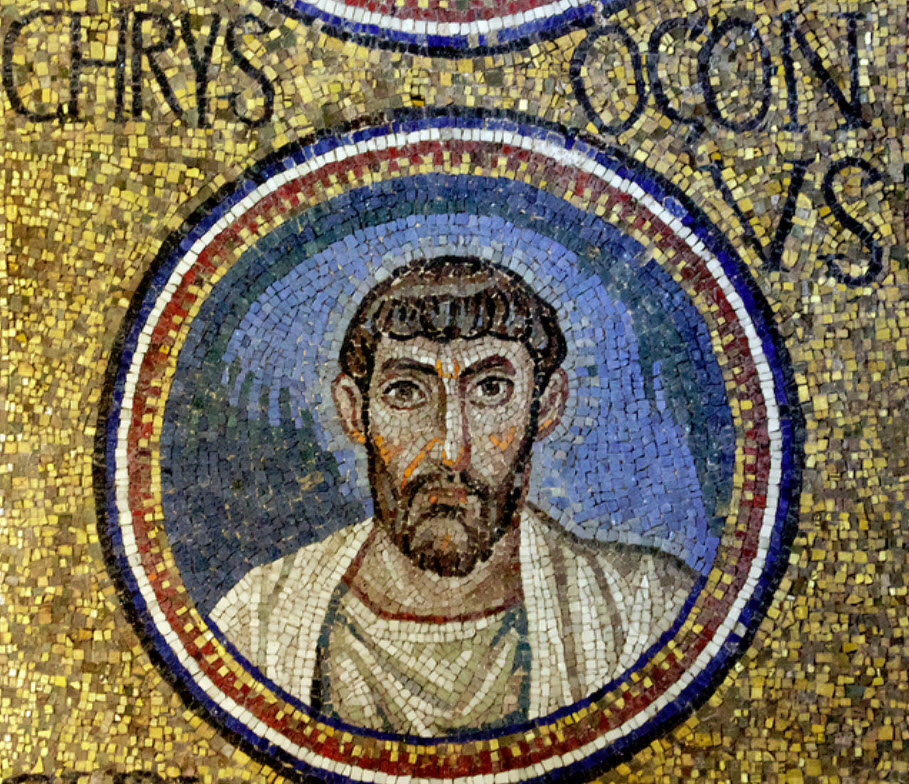
A mosaic of Saint Chrysogonus

About the 6th century arose a legend of the martyr that made him a Roman and brought him into relation with Saint Anastasia, evidently to explain the veneration of Chrysogonus in the Roman church that bears his name. According to holy tradition, Chrysogonus was a knight in the Roman army and functionary of the vicarius Urbis, and the Christian teacher of Anastasia, the daughter of the noble Roman Praetextatus. Being thrown into prison during the persecution of Diocletian, he comforted by his letters the severely afflicted Anastasia. By order of Diocletian, Chrysogonus was brought before the emperor at Aquileia, condemned to death, and beheaded. His corpse, thrown into the sea, was washed ashore and buried by the aged priest Zoilus who is also the patron saint of Zadar. In the legend the death of the saint is placed on 23 November. The Catholic Church celebrates him on 24 November, the anniversary of the dedication of the church that bears his name. The Eastern Orthodox Church celebrates his feast day on 22 December together with his spiritual daughter Saint Anastasia of Sirmium.

St Chrysogonus is one of the saints mentioned during the Commemoration of the Living in the Roman Canon. He is invoked in the Canon of the Mass in the prayer known as the Communicantes (from the first Latin word of the prayer):
"In communion with the whole Church, they venerate above all others the memory of the glorious ever-virgin Mary, Mother of our God and Lord, Jesus Christ, then of blessed Joseph, husband of the Virgin, your blessed Apostles and Martyrs, Peter and Paul, Andrew, James, ...Chrysogonus, John and Paul, Cosmas and Damian and all your Saints: grant through their merits and prayers that in all things we may be defended by the help of your protection."
