= Fausta of Sirmium =

Saint Fausta
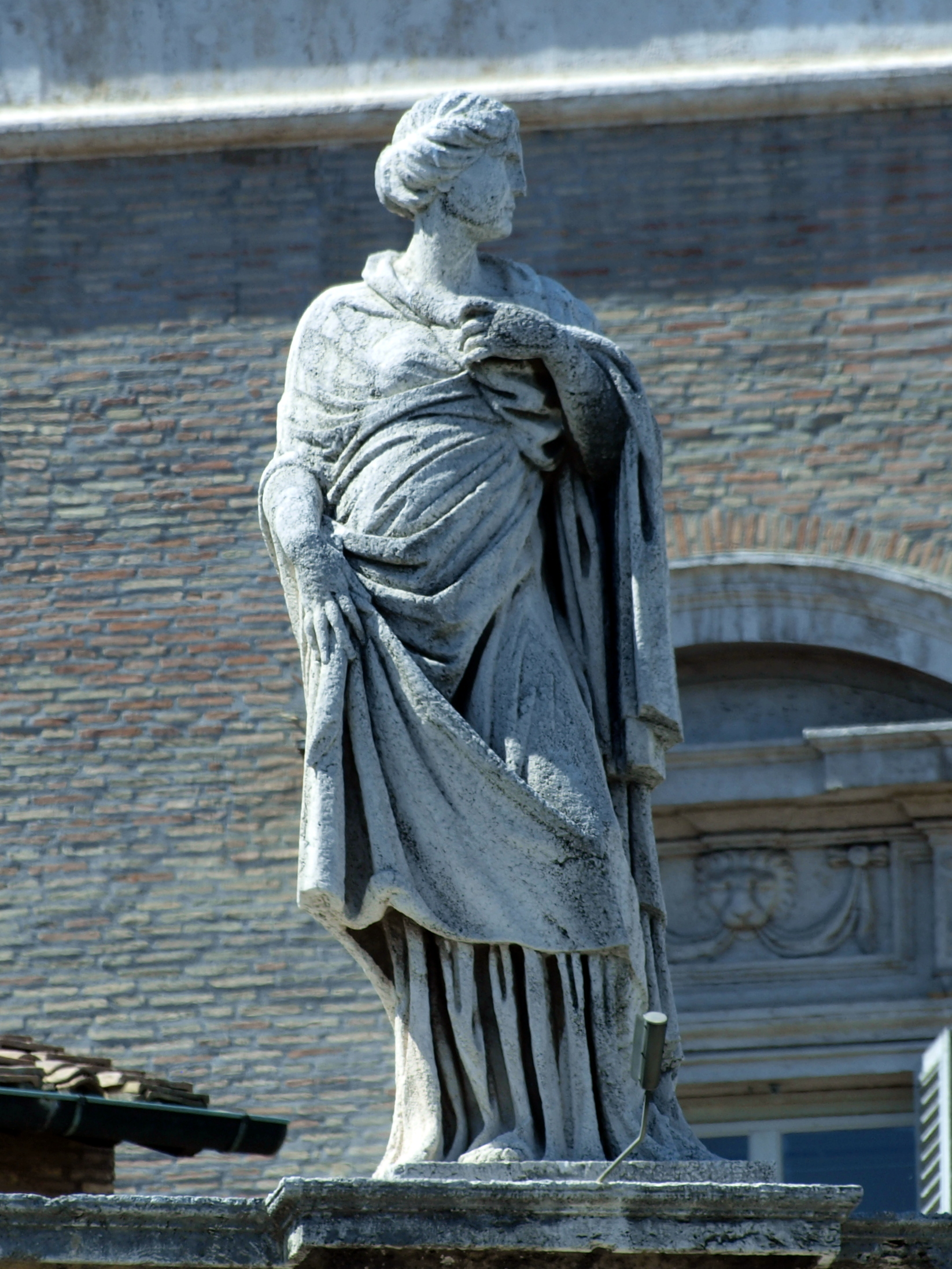
- Died: 3rd Century
- Venerated in: Roman Catholic Church, Eastern Orthodox Church
- Canonized: Pre-Congregation
- Feast: 19 December

Fausta, was the mother of St. Anastasia of Sirmium. Fausta was a model mother having had the virtue raising a saintly daughter.

Fausta is one of the 140 Colonnade saints which adorn St. Peter's Square.
