= Baklahorani =

Recurring event

Baklahorani Μπακλαχοράνι
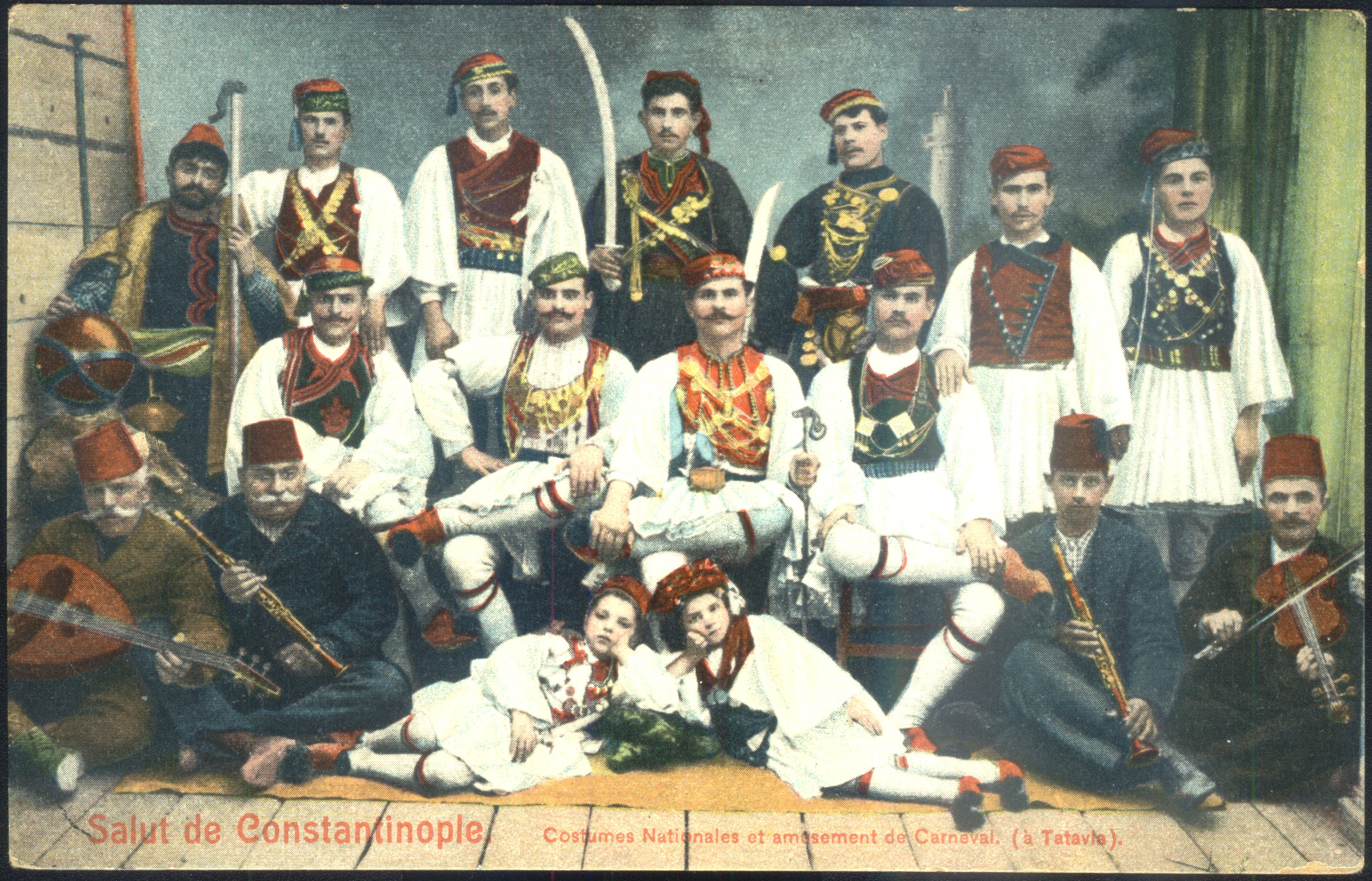
- People of Tataula (now Kurtuluş) dressed in traditional costumes during the carnival, 1930s.
- Date: Shrove Monday
- Frequency: Annual
- Locations: Tataula (now Kurtuluş), Istanbul, Turkey
- Inaugurated: again in 2010 after 66 years of ban

Location of Kurtuluş in Istanbul

Baklahorani (alternatively, Bakla Horani; Greek: Μπακλαχοράνι) or Tatavla carnival (Greek: Αποκριές στα Ταταύλα) was a carnival traditionally celebrated annually in Istanbul, Turkey, by members of the local Greek Orthodox community on Clean Monday, the last Monday before Lent. It took place during 19th century and perhaps earlier, but was banned by the Turkish authorities in 1943. In 2010 the carnival was revived in a watered-down version unlike the licentious original. This has now become a regular event on the local calendar.

== Carnival ==
For almost five centuries, the Greek communities throughout Istanbul (former Constantinople) celebrated pre-Lent festivals with colourful events that included bawdy parades and parties held indoors and in the street. These lasted for weeks before the 40-day Lent period. Baklahorani, on Clean Monday, the last day of the carnival season before Lent, became the culminating event in the mid-19th century.

The name of the event literally translates as 'I eat beans', a reference to Lenten dietary restrictions. Although the event was led by local Greeks, the celebrations were not limited to the Greek community, but were open to everyone. It was an opportunity to bring people from various neighbourhoods together, while they gathered for the final celebrations.

Events kicked off with a masked parade that proceeded through Istanbul's Greek neighbourhoods, beginning in Pera and gathering people along the way. The parade was accompanied by people dancing tsamiko and Anatolian folk dances, and playing traditional instruments, including drums, zurnas, clarinets and mandolins. Residents of Bakırköy, Samatya, Fener and Balat crossed the Golden Horn via the Galata and Unkapanı bridges, and, joining the revellers from Pera, gathered to danced in the large square outside Saint Demetrius Church in Kurtuluş, a neighbourhood in Şişli district at that time known as Tatavla and nicknamed Little Athens. Meanwhile people from neighbourhoods along the Bosphorus, and from Şişli and Kemerburgaz gathered in front of the Pangaltı Catholic Cemetery and marched through the main street to the same square, where the celebrations culminated. Young Greek men often wore the traditional fustanella costume, put on fake beards or moustaches, and painted their faces with flour or coal powder. Women often dressed in low-cut garments.

Maria Iordanidou described Bakalahorani in her 1963 novel Loxandra, which tells the story of a young Greek woman of Constantinople in the earliest years of the 20th century. According to her, people "from all over Istanbul" gathered in Tatavla, singing folk songs along their route. She wrote that: "Groups of young girls sang songs and children swung on gondolier swings or rode merry-go-rounds decorated with bands and flags. The young men of Tatavla would give displays of their unique dances and games."

The carnival was at its most popular after World War I, during the years of the Allied Occupation of the city (1918–1922). It continued after the establishment of the Republic of Turkey until World War II.

== Prohibition and revival ==
Bakalahorani was one of the most famous Christian festivals of Istanbul until its last celebration in 1941. After that, the Greeks, along with the city's other non-Muslim communities, were subject to social and financial discrimination. A law banning people from wearing masks ended the original Baklahorani carnival in 1943.

In 2010, nearly 70 years after the last celebration, the historical carnival was revived by a group of Greeks and Turks who sang, danced and paraded in costumes through the streets of Şişli . The driving forces behind the carnival's reincarnation were Hüseyin Irmak, a researcher who was born in Kurtuluş, and Haris Theodorelis Rigas, a Greek who now lives in Istanbul, where he plays music in taverns, specialising in a "near-extinct" style of music blending Greek and Turkish influences. Irmak and Rigas see the reestablishment of the carnival as an opportunity for people to rediscover Turkey's multicultural past, while adding colour to people's lives. Due to concerns about security, the 2010 celebration was conducted on a small scale without advance announcements, but the 2011 celebration was a full-scale public event.
