= Zadar Polyptych =

Polyptych by Vittore Carpaccio

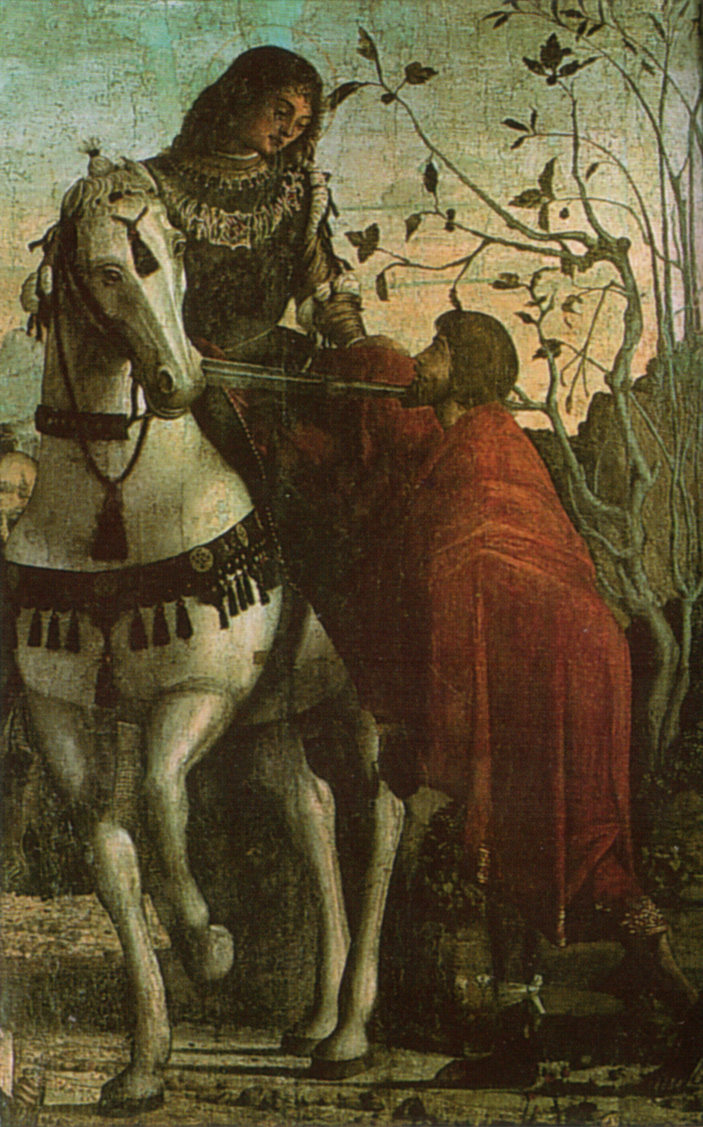
- Saint Martin and the Beggar from the Zadar Polyptych
- Artist: Vittore Carpaccio
- Year: c. 1480-1490
- Type: Oil on panel
- Location: Museum of Sacred Art, Cathedral, Zadar

The Zadar Polyptych is an oil-on-panel by Italian artist Vittore Carpaccio, painted around 1480–1490. It is now in the Museum of Sacred Art of the Zadar Cathedral, in southern Croatia. It was commissioned by Martin Mladošić, canon, notary and archpresbyter of Nin from Zadar, for the altar of St. Martin in Zadar Cathedral.

== Description ==
The polyptych includes six panels in two orders. In the central part of the lower register is the titular of the polyptych, St. Martin, flanked by patron saints of Zadar, St. Anastasia and St. Simeon. The upper register consists of paintings of St. Peter, St. Paul, and St. Jerome. According to records from 1746, during visitation by the archbishop Mate Karaman, it can be assumed that a painting of the Blessed Virgin Mary was once in the uppermost register, but it has since been lost. Ornamental frame, originally connecting polyptych paintings, was created by a local master Ivan of Korčula.

The figures are painted on a background with rocky hills, with no unitary treatment of the landscape based on geometric perspective but, as in Gentile Bellini's works, with a series of separate blocks.

== World War Two ==
The paintings were damaged during World War Two when they were moved from a humid shelter to a dry attic. Large portions of paint were lost due to sudden changes in humidity and temperature. Therefore the polyptych was restored two times by the Restoration Institute of the Yugoslav Academy of Sciences and Arts in Zagreb, which occurred in 1948 and 1963 respectively

== Gallery ==
Upper panels

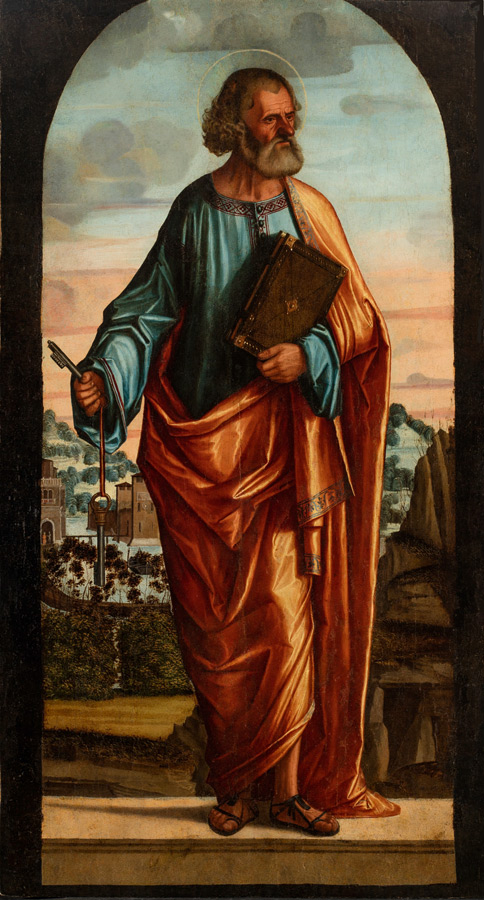
St Peter

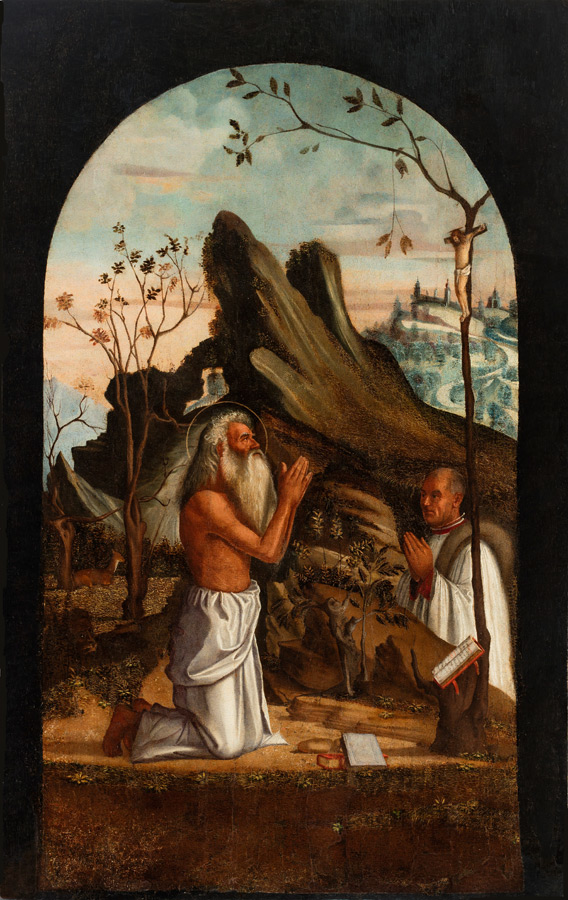
St Jerome with kneeling donor

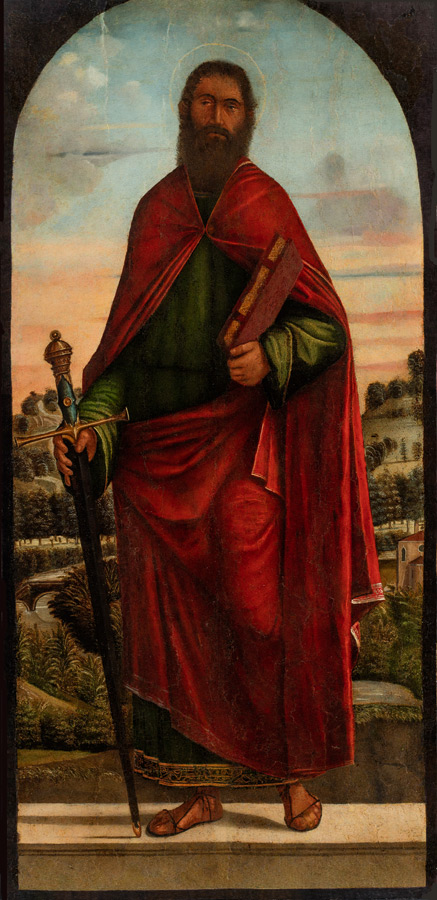
St Paul
Lower panels

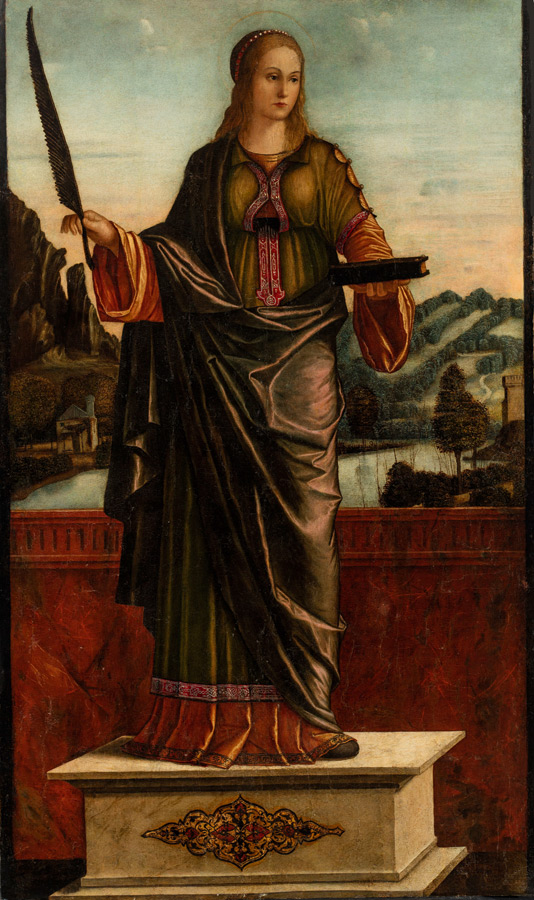
St Anastasia

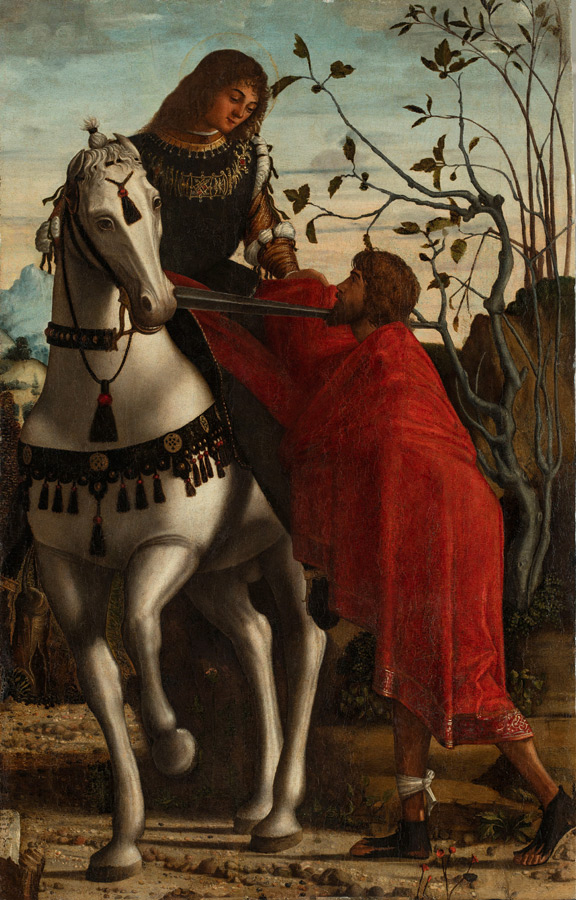
St Martin and the Beggar

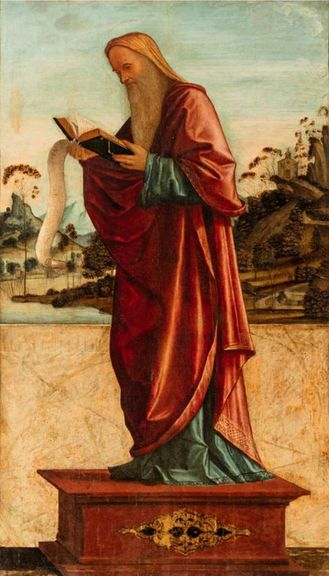
St Simeon

== See also ==
- Venetian school (art)

== Sources ==
- Peter Humfrey, Carpaccio, Chaucer Press (2005)
- Jadranka Baković, Conservation and Restoration of the Polyptych of St. Martin by Vittore Carpaccio, Croatian Conservation Institute (2017)
