= Donatus of Zadar =

Dalmatian saint, bishop and diplomat

Saint Donatus of Zadar

Bishop
- Born: Jadera / Zara, Byzantine Empire (now Zadar, Croatia)
- Died: c. 811 AD
- Venerated in: Eastern Orthodox Church; Roman Catholic Church
- Major shrine: Cathedral of St. Anastasia
- Feast: 25 February
- Patronage: Zadar

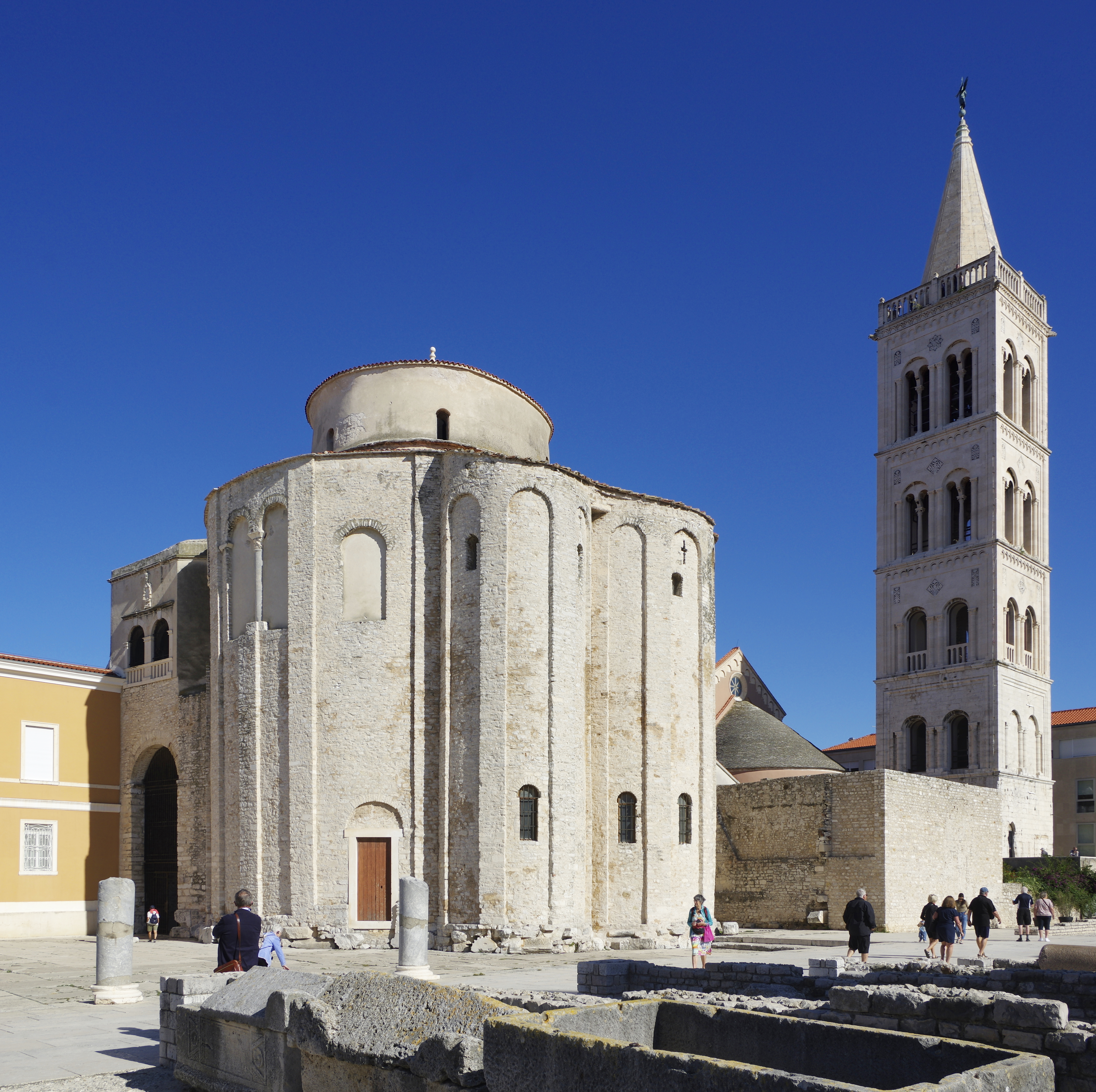
Church of St. Donatus in Zadar

Donatus (second half of 8th century Zadar – first half of 9th century), also called Donato of Zara, was a Dalmatian saint who became a bishop and a diplomat for the Dalmatian city-state of Zadar (Zara). His feast day is celebrated on 25 February.

Donatus is mentioned in Frankish annals from 805 as an ambassador of the Dalmatian cities to Charlemagne in Thionville. Donatus is credited for initiating either construction or expansion of the Church of the Holy Trinity. The church was completed in the beginning of the 9th century and in the 15th century. Its name was later changed by the Venetians to the Church of St. Donatus.

== Donatus's Church ==
The church is the largest Pre-Romanesque building in Croatia, and was built upon the ruin of the old Roman forum, part of the forum's foundations can be seen today.

The marble sarcophagus in the cathedral preserves the relics of the Sirmian martyr Anastasia with an inscription dating from Donatus' time. According to tradition, Donatus brought the relics to Zara from Constantinople, when he was there with the Venetian duke Beato. They had been ordered by Charlemagne to negotiate the border between the Byzantine Empire and the Croatian territories that were under the dominion of Charlemagne's Frankish Empire.

Donatus died around 811, and was buried in his Church of the Holy Trinity (today the Church of St. Donatus). After 1809, following the French occupation of Zadar, his bones were transferred to the Cathedral of St. Anastasia where they lie to this date, and mass has not been celebrated at the church for around two centuries.
