= Kurtuluş =

- Neighborhood
- Location of Kurtuluş in Istanbul
- Coordinates: 41.04845°N 28.98095°E
- Country: Turkey
- Region: Marmara
- Province: Istanbul
- District: Şişli
- Time zone: UTC+3 (TRT)
- Postal code: 34375, 34377, 34379
- Area code: 0212

Kurtuluş is a neighbourhood of the Şişli district of Istanbul that was originally called Tatavla, meaning 'stables' in Greek (Greek: Ταταύλα). The modern Turkish name means "liberation", "salvation", "independence" or "deliverance". On 13 April 1929, six years after the Republic of Turkey was founded, a fire swept through the neighbourhood and largely destroyed it, with 207 houses going up in flames. The name was changed to Kurtuluş to mark the rebuilding of the area.

Once a predominantly Greek Orthodox and Armenian neighbourhood, its population today mostly consists of Turks who moved there after the Republic of Turkey was founded in 1923. There is still a small population or Greeks, Armenians and Jews, as well as some Kurds who are relatively recent economic migrants.

Kurtuluş is served by the Osmanbey Metro station and innumerable buses from Taksim. It is adjacent to Pangaltı, Feriköy and Dolapdere.

== History ==
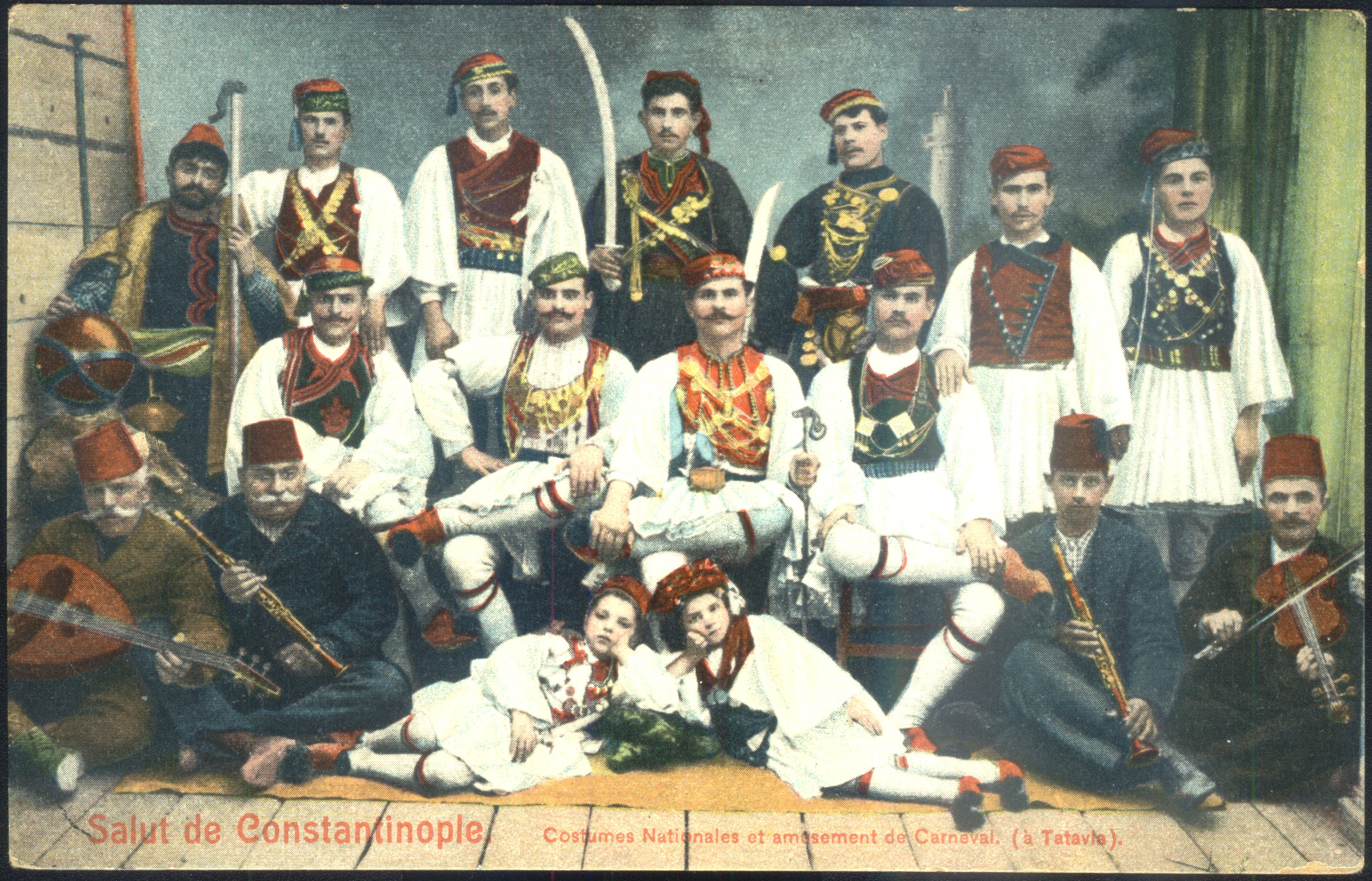
Greeks of Tataula (now Kurtuluş) dressed in traditional costumes during the carnival (Baklahorani), 1930s.

The quarter started life in the 16th century as a residential area for Greeks from the island of Chios who were settled here to work in the principal dockyards of the Ottoman Empire in the neighbouring Kasımpaşa quarter; they originally lived in Kasımpaşa but retreated uphill to a new area when their church there was turned into a mosque. In 1793 Sultan Selim III decreed that only Greeks would be allowed to live in Tatavla, a distinction it shared with the small Aegean town of Ayvalık.

In 1832, a fire completely destroyed the neighbourhood, with 600 houses and 30 shops going up in flames. During the 19th century Tatavla's population reached around 20,000 and it hosted several Orthodox churches (Hagios Demetrios, Hagios Georgios and Hagios Eleftherios), schools and tavernas; it was nicknamed Little Athens because of its Greek character. It was typically a residential area for Greeks of more modest income. Nevertheless, a number of grand houses were built in the late 19th century, some of which still stand today, especially along Kurtuluş Caddesi.

Despite the turmoil of the Balkan War, followed by World War I and the Greco-Turkish War (1919–1922) and then the devastating fire, the neighbourhood continued to be home to a large Greek population (as well as a significant Armenian and Jewish population). However, the riots of 1955 persuaded most of the Greeks that the time had come to emigrate.

== Culture ==
Tatavla used to be famous for the lively Baklahorani carnival, an annual event organised by the Greek Orthodox community on Clean Monday, the last Monday before Lent. It took place during 19th century and perhaps earlier. This was banned by the Turkish authorities in 1943, but was revived in 2010.

A vivid description of pre-First World War Tatavla is to be found in Maria Iordanidou's 1963 novel Loxandra, which is based on the experiences of her grandmother.

== See also ==
- Apostolos the New
