= Great martyr =

Classification of saints in Eastern Christianity

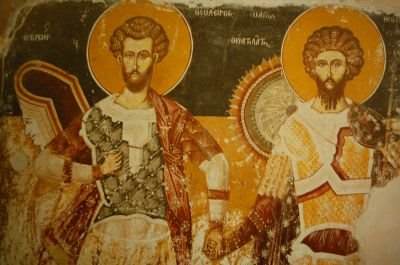
Icon of Great-Martyrs Theodore Tiron and Theodore Stratelates, 16th century, Monastery of the Transfiguration, Prilep (North Macedonia)

A great martyr (also spelled greatmartyr or great-martyr) or megalomartyr (from Byzantine Greek μεγαλομάρτυς, megalomártus, from μέγας, mégas 'great' + μάρτυς, mártus 'martyr'; Church Slavonic: великомꙋ́ченикъ; Romanian: mare mucenic; Georgian: დიდმოწამე) is a classification of saints who are venerated in the Eastern Orthodox Church and those Eastern Catholic Churches which follow the Rite of Constantinople. The term is also used in Malta, especially by parishes dedicated to Saint George in reference to him (San Ġorġ Megalomartri).

Generally speaking, a greatmartyr is a martyr who has undergone excruciating tortures—often performing miracles and converting unbelievers to Christianity in the process—and who has attained widespread veneration throughout the Church. These saints are often from the first centuries of the Church, before the Edict of Milan. This term is normally not applied to saints who could be better described as hieromartyrs (martyred clergy) or protomartyrs (the first martyr in a given group).

== List ==
- Anastasia of Sirmium
- Apostolos the New
- Artemius
- Barbara of Nicomedia
- Prince Bidzin, Prince Elizbar, and Prince Shalva of Georgia
- Catherine of Alexandria
- Charalambos
- Christina of Bolsena
- Demetrius of Thessaloniki
- Euphemia
- Eustace
- George of Lydda
- George the New of Sofia (1515)
- Gobron
- Irene of Macedonia
- James of Persia
- John the New of Suceava
- Ketevan of Mukhrani
- Konstanti Kakhi
- Kyriaki of Nicomedia
- Lazarus of Serbia
- Marina the Martyr
- Menas of Egypt
- Mercurius of Caesarea
- Pantaleon of Nicomedia
- Paraskevi of Rome
- Phanourios the Newly-Revealed
- Procopius of Scythopolis
- Sabbas the Goth
- Theodore Gavra of Atran in Chaldea
- Theodore Stratelates
- Theodore Tiron
- Tryphon of Campsada
- Xenia of Peloponnesus

== See also ==
- Hieromartyr
