= Zadar Cathedral =

- Cathedral of Saint Anastasia
- Katedrala svete Stošije
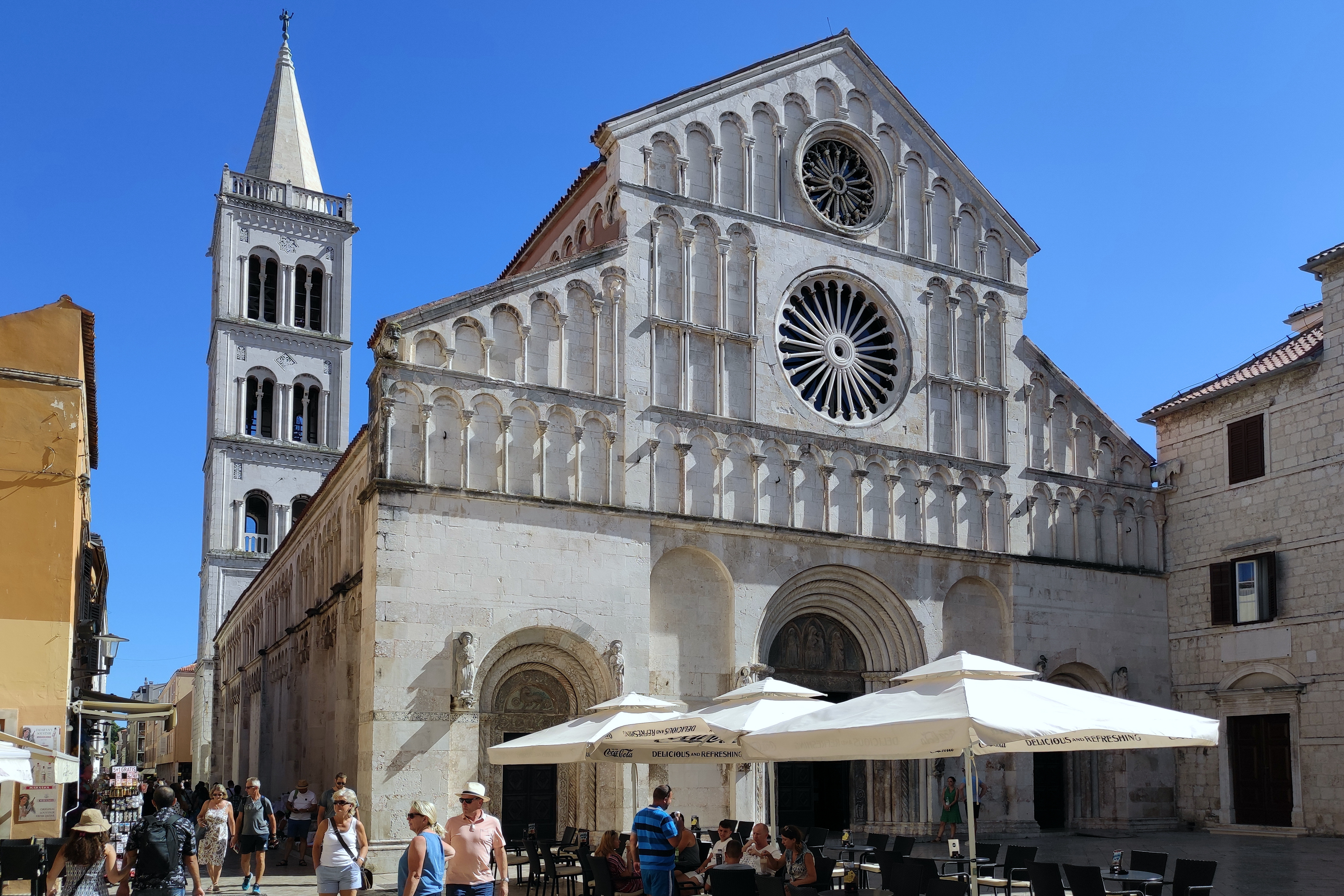

- Location within Croatia
- 44°6′58.5″N 15°13′28″E
- Location: Zadar
- Country: Croatia
- Denomination: Roman Catholic

History
- Status: Cathedral

Architecture
- Functional status: Active
- Style: Romanesque; Gothic (some parts)
- Years built: 4th & 5th centuries 12th & 13th centuries

Administration
- Archdiocese: Zadar

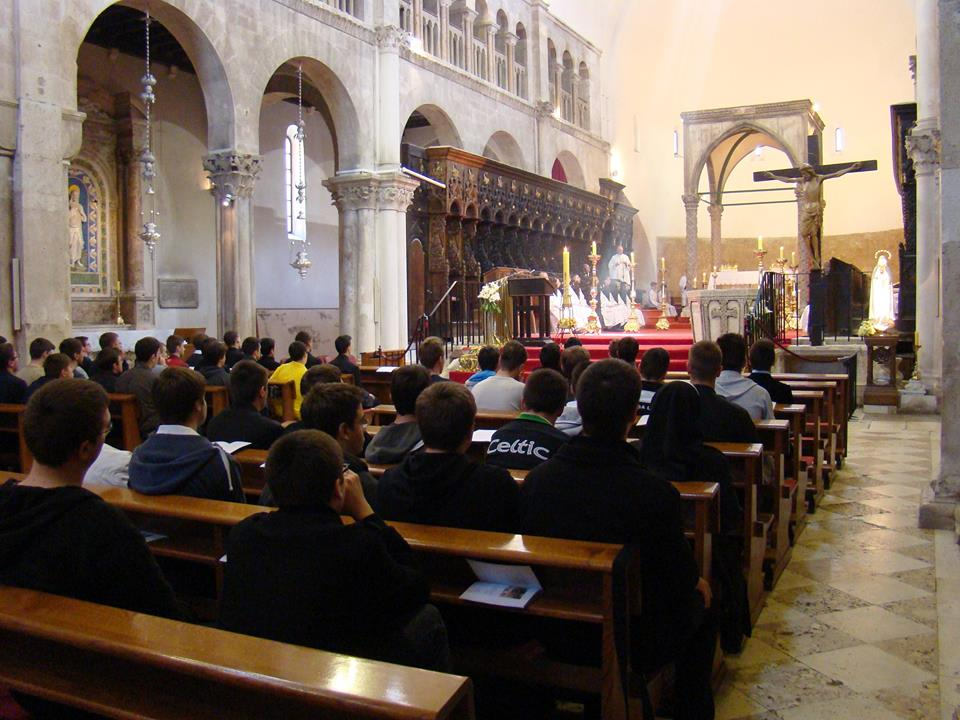
Cathedral interior, 2015

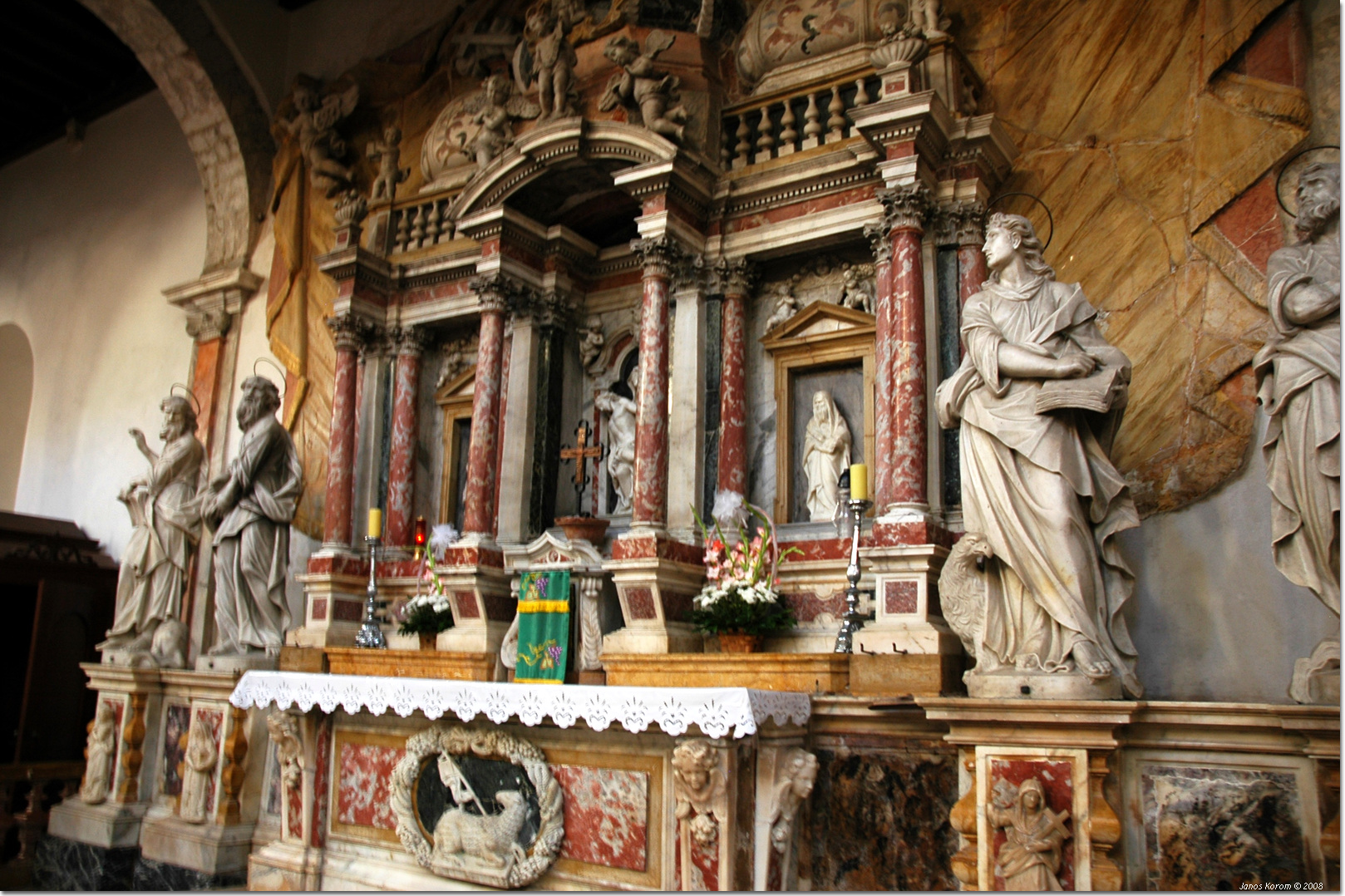
Cathedral's side altar with tabernacle

The Cathedral of St. Anastasia (Croatian: Katedrala sv. Stošije) is the Roman Catholic cathedral of Zadar, Croatia, seat of the Archdiocese of Zadar, and the largest church in all of Dalmatia.

The church's origins date back to a Christian basilica built in the 4th and 5th centuries, while much of the currently standing three-nave building was constructed in the Romanesque style during the 12th and 13th centuries. The site has been submitted to UNESCO's Tentative List of World Heritage Sites.

== History ==
The first known bishop in Zadar was Felix. He attended two church councils, the first in Aquileia in 381 and the second in Milan in 390. The basilica's original patron was St. Peter. During the time of bishop Donatus, the diocese received the ashes of Saint Anastasia of Sirmium from Emperor Nikephoros I, whom the cathedral took as patron. Donatus commissioned a sarcophagus for the remains, which are still held in the cathedral. The church was largely remade in the 11th-12th centuries, and reconsecrated by Pope Alexander III in 1177.

During the siege of Zadar by the Venetians and Crusaders in 1202, the cathedral was heavily damaged. For the entire 13th century the building was under repair. It was reconsecrated on 27 May 1285, although the new building, designed in a fashion similar to the Santa Maria della Piazza church in Ancona, was completed only in 1324.

Ground floor and first floor of the bell tower were built in 1452. To complete the construction, Sir Thomas Graham Jackson was hired and the tower was finished in 1893.

Pope John Paul II came to the cathedral on June 9, 2003, on one of his last international travels.

== Description ==
The façade, completed in 1324, has two orders: the lower and more massive one has three portals, the central one being crowned by a bas-relief of Madonna and Child with Sts. Crisogonus and Anastasia; the upper one culminates in a triangular pediment, and is decorated with four orders of Lombard bands. These include a large Romanesque-style rose window and a smaller one in Gothic style. The left edge of the façade is decorated with a statue of a lion, and the right edge with a statue of a bull: these are symbols of the evangelists Mark and Luke, respectively. The richly decorated main portal contains a bas relief of the four apostles. The lunette of the left portal is decorated with a statue of the mystical lamb, while the consoles near the vault contain statues of angel Gabriel and Virgin Mary, which are older than the portal.

The interior has a nave and two aisles, the former three times larger than the latter, which are separated by alternately arranged stone pillars and pylons. The presbytery is elevated; the 12th century crypt is located under it. In the presbytery are choir stalls, executed in Gothic style by 15th century master Matej Morozan; above the main altar is the early Gothic ciborium from 1322, while beyond it is a stone seat made for the archbishop. On the northern wall of the marble altar are pictures of St. Dominic and the Sacred Heart. The altar was transferred from the eponymous church. The second altar is dedicated to the souls in Purgatory and was built by the Venetian stonemason Peter Onega in 1805. The altarpiece is a work of art by Josip Palma Jr. At the end of the nave is a marble altar with a marble paneling depicting the Sacred Heart, while the apse houses a marble sarcophagus with the relics of St. Anastasia with the inscription by Bishop Donat (9th century). There are also fragments of medieval frescoes in the cathedral.

The southern aisle is home to a marble altar used for storing relics. Next to it is the altar of St. Sacrament, by sculptor A. Viviani from the year 1718. The altar has rich decorations with columns and statues. Above the tabernacle is the statue of the Madonna with the dead Christ lying in her lap, with statues of Moses and Elijah on the sides. On the altar wings there are larger statues of the four evangelists, and, below them, figures of virtues and, on an antependium, a statue of the Lamb of God. The southern aisle ends with an apse housing remains of frescoes. Above the aisles is a matroneum.

The church has a hexagonal baptistery that dates back to the 6th century, located on the south side of the cathedral. The original baptistery was destroyed in the bombing of Zadar of December 16, 1943, and was restored in 1989.

The walls and the apse of the sacristy, also known as the chapel of St. Barbara, belong to the oldest parts of the cathedral, along with the floor mosaic depicting two deer (early 5th century).

The museum of art of the church houses the Zadar Polyptych, an early work by Venetian painter Vittore Carpaccio.

The bell tower was built in two stages. The ground floor and first floor were built in 1452 during the reign of Archbishop Vallaresso, while the upper floors date from 1890 to 1894 under design by the English architect and art historian Thomas Graham Jackson. The three upper floors, with four sides, are decorated with double mullioned windows. A flat wall surface is stylized with a floral mosaic, while the wreaths that separate floors are highlighted with a fretwork. At the top is an octagonal pyramid with a brass statue of an angel which rotates according to the direction of the wind.

== See also ==
- Tentative list of World Heritage Sites in Croatia
- List of cathedrals in Croatia
- List of tallest structures built before the 20th century
- List of tallest buildings in Croatia
