= Anastasia of Sirmium =

Christian saint and martyr (died 304)

Saint Anastasia
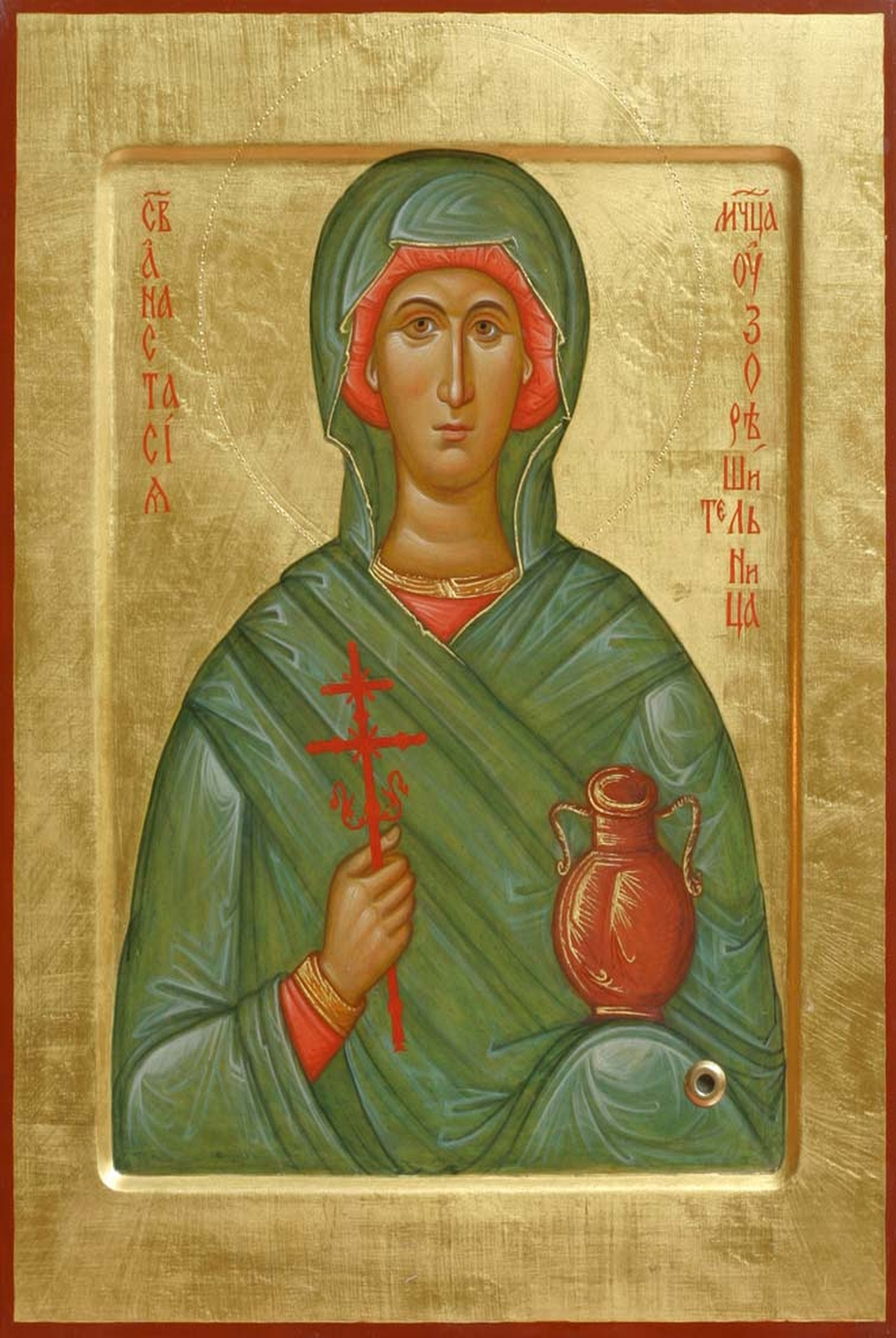
- Great Martyr Anastasia, the Deliverer from Potions (Byzantine icon, 14th-15th century, State Hermitage Museum, Saint Petersburg, Russia)

Virgin and martyr
- Born: 281 AD; Rome
- Died: 25 December 304 AD; Pannonia Secunda (modern Serbia) or Palmaria
- Venerated in: Catholic Church; Oriental Orthodox Churches; Eastern Catholic Churches; Eastern Orthodox Church
- Canonized: Pre-Congregation
- Major shrine: Cathedral of St. Anastasia, Zadar
- Feast: 25 December (Catholic); 22 December (Greek Orthodox) 28 September (Syriac Orthodox)
- Patronage: Pharmacists, Doctors, apothecaries, healers

Saint Anastasia (died 25 December 304 AD) is a Christian saint and martyr who died at Sirmium in the Roman province of Pannonia Secunda (modern Serbia). In the Eastern Orthodox Church, she is venerated as St. Anastasia the Pharmakolytria, i.e. "Deliverer from Potions" (Ἁγία Ἀναστασία ἡ Φαρμακολύτρια). This epithet is also translated as "One who Cures (Wounds)" in Lampe's A Patristic Greek Lexicon.

Concerning Anastasia, little is reliably known, save that she died in the persecutions of Diocletian; most stories about her date from several centuries after her death and make her variously a Roman or Sirmian native and a Roman citizen of patrician rank. One legend makes her the daughter of a certain Praetextatus and the pupil of Saint Chrysogonus. Catholic tradition states that her mother was St. Fausta of Sirmium.

Anastasia has long been venerated as a healer and exorcist.

She is one of seven virgins and martyrs who, along with Blessed Virgin Mary, are commemorated by name in the Roman Canon of the Mass.

== Hagiography ==
Before the liturgical reforms of the twentieth century, this martyr enjoyed the distinction, unique in the Roman liturgy, of having a special commemoration in the second Mass on Christmas Day. This daytime Mass was originally celebrated not in honour of Christ's birth but rather in commemorating this martyr, and towards the end of the 5th century, her name was also inserted in the Roman Canon.

A "Passio" not earlier than the 6th century, gives a legendary account that makes Anastasia a Roman without claiming that she suffered martyrdom in Rome. The same legend connects her name with that of St. Chrysogonus, put to death in Aquileia, though the San Crisogono church in Rome is dedicated to him.

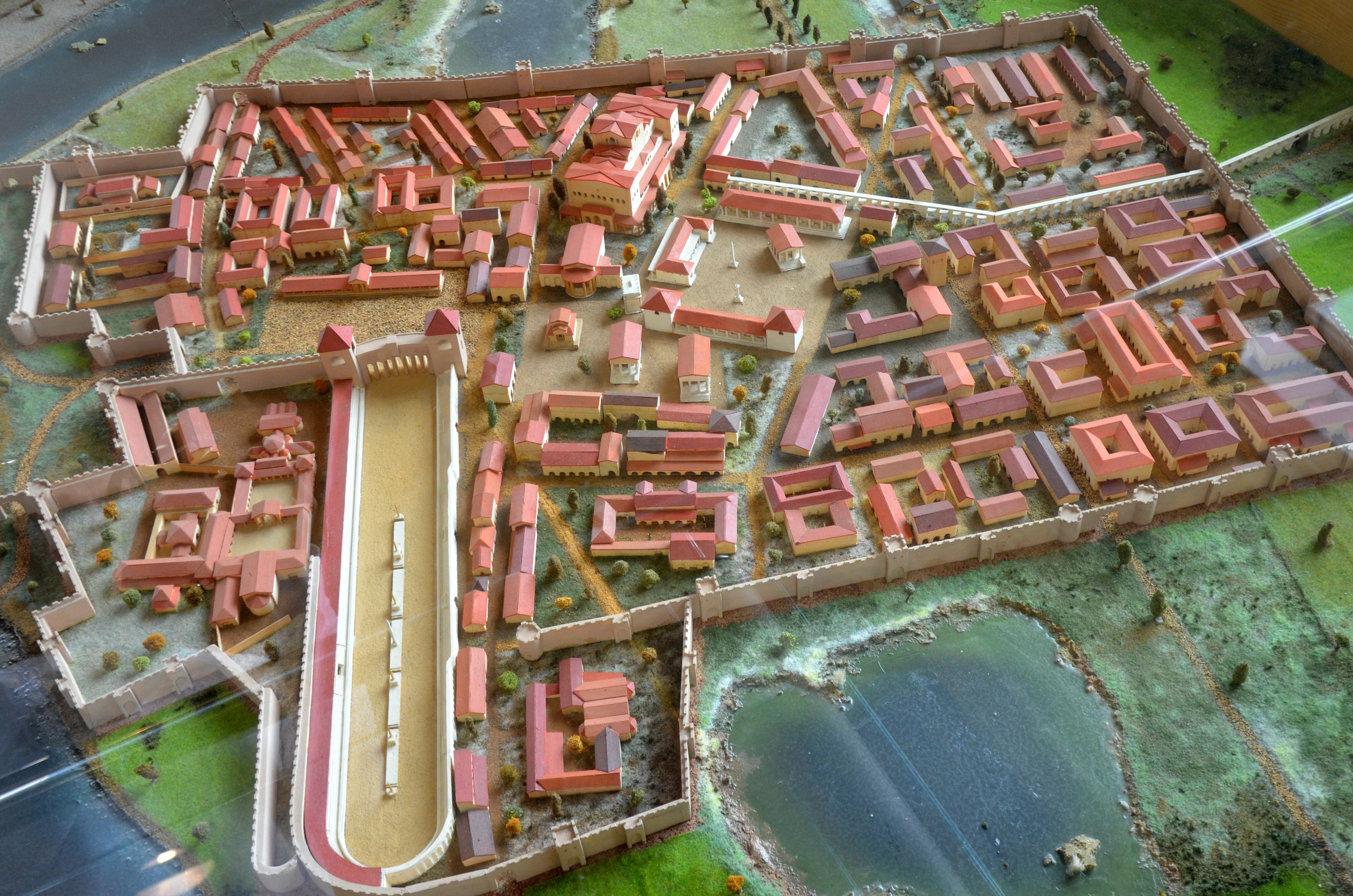
A scale model of Sirmium in Sremska Mitrovica, Serbia

The legend makes Anastasia the daughter of Praetextatus, a Roman vir illustris, and affirms that she had Chrysogonus as a teacher. Early in the persecution of Diocletian, the Emperor summoned Chrysogonus to Aquileia where he suffered martyrdom. Anastasia, having gone from Aquileia to Sirmium to visit the faithful of that place, was beheaded on the island of Palmaria, 25 December. Her body was interred in the house of Apollonia, which had been converted into a basilica.

The whole account is purely legendary and rests on no historical foundations. All that is certain is that a martyr named Anastasia gave her life for the faith in Sirmium and that her memory was kept in that city. In Rome, a church in ancient times bore the name of a certain Anastasia and is listed under the name Titulus Anastasia in the acts of the 499 Roman synods. At some point in history, this church came to be seen as dedicated to this martyr of the same name. It has the rank of a basilica and is one of the titular churches of Rome assigned to a cardinal-priest.

== Basilica ==
The basilica of Sant'Anastasia al Palatino in Rome was built in the late 3rd century – early 4th century, possibly by a Roman woman named Anastasia. Later the church was entitled to the martyr with the same name, Anastasia of Sirmium.

=== In the West ===
The Martyrologium Hieronymianum records her name on 25 December, not for Sirmium alone, but also for Constantinople, a circumstance based on a separate story. According to Theodorus Lector, during the patriarchate of Gennadius (458-471) the body of the martyr was transferred to Constantinople and interred in a church which had hitherto been known as "Anastasis" (Gr. Anastasis, Resurrection); thenceforth the church took the name of Anastasia.

Similarly, veneration of St. Anastasia was introduced into Rome from Sirmium by means of an already existing church. As this church was already quite famous, it brought the feast day of the saint into especial prominence. There existed in Rome from the 4th century, at the foot of the Palatine Hill and above the Circus Maximus, a church which had been adorned by Pope Damasus (366-384) with a large mosaic. It was known as "titulus Anastasiae", and is mentioned as such in the Acts of the Roman Council of 499. There is some uncertainty as to the origin of this name; either the church owes its foundation to and was named after a Roman matron Anastasia, as in the case of several other titular churches of Rome (Duchesne), or it was originally an "Anastasis" church (dedicated to the Resurrection of Christ), such as existed already at Ravenna and Constantinople; from the word "Anastasis" came eventually the name "titulus Anastasiae" (Grisar). Whatever way this happened, the church was an especially prominent one from the 4th to the 6th century, being the only titular church in the centre of ancient Rome and surrounded by the monuments of the city's pagan past.

Within its jurisdiction was the Palatine where the imperial court was located. Since the veneration of the Sirmian martyr, Anastasia, received a new impetus in Constantinople during the second half of the 5th century, it can be inferred that the intimate contemporary relations between Old and New Rome brought about an increase in devotion to St. Anastasia at the foot of the Palatine.

At all events, the insertion of her name into the Roman Canon of the Mass towards the end of the 5th century show that she then occupied a unique position among the saints publicly venerated at Rome. Thenceforth, the church on the Palatine is known as "titulus sanctae Anastasiae" and the martyr of Sirmium became the titular saint of the old 4th-century basilica. Evidently because of its position as titular church of the district (including the imperial dwellings on the Palatine), this church long maintained an eminent rank among the churches of Rome; only two churches preceded it in honour: St. John Lateran, the mother church of Rome and seat of the Pope, and Santa Maria Maggiore. This ancient sanctuary stands today quite isolated amid the ruins of Rome.

Commemoration of St. Anastasia occurs liturgically in the second Mass on Christmas Day, and is the last remnant of the former prominence enjoyed by this saint and her church in the life of Christian Rome.

According to tradition, St. Donatus of Zadar brought Anastasia's relics to Zadar, Croatia from Constantinople, when he was there with the Venetian duke Beato. They had been ordered by Charlemagne to negotiate the border between the Byzantine Empire and the Croatian territories that were under the dominion of Charlemagne's Frankish Empire. Her relics lie in the Cathedral of St. Anastasia in Zadar. In 1976, part of her relics were translated from Zadar to the Cathedral Basilica of St. Demetrius, in Sremska Mitrovica (Sirmium), Serbia and are kept in a reliquary in front of the main altar. Relics of the saint are also enshrined at Benediktbeuern Abbey in Benediktbeuern, Bavaria, Germany.

=== In the East ===
The Orthodox Church venerates St. Anastasia as a Great Martyr, usually referring to her as "Anastasia the Deliverer from Potions", "Anastasia the Healer" or "Anastasia of Sirmium". She is often given the epithets "Deliverer from Bonds" and "Deliverer from Potions" because her intercessions are credited with the protection of the faithful from poison and other harmful substances. Her feast day is celebrated on 22 December on the Eastern Orthodox (and Byzantine Catholic) Church calendar. According to the Synaxarion, she was the daughter of Praepextatus (a pagan) and Fausta (a Christian).

In the 5th century, the relics of St Anastasia were transferred to Constantinople, where an already standing church was dedicated to her. Later, the relics, including her skull, were transferred to the Monastery of St. Anastasia the Pharmokolitria, Chalkidiki of Greece, near Mount Athos. In 2012, the relics were stolen and have not been recovered.

== Gallery ==
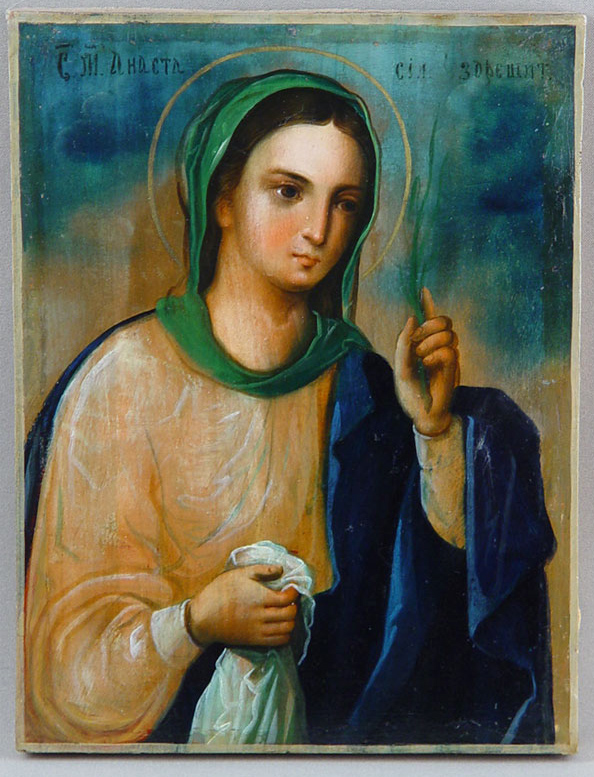
Icon by an anonymous Russian painter

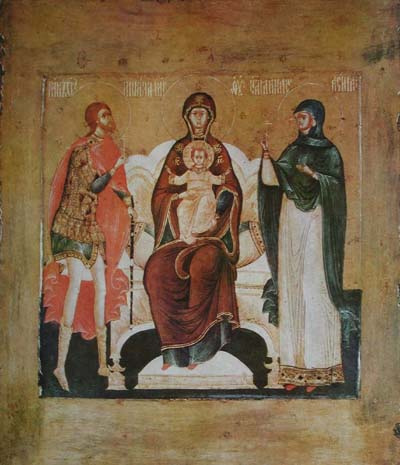
Icon depicting the Theotokos, Nikita the Goth and Anastasia of Sirmium

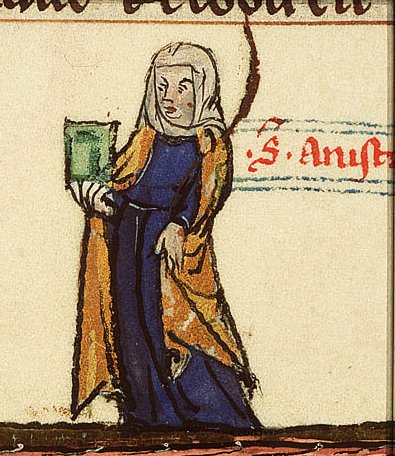
Manuscript depicting Anastasia

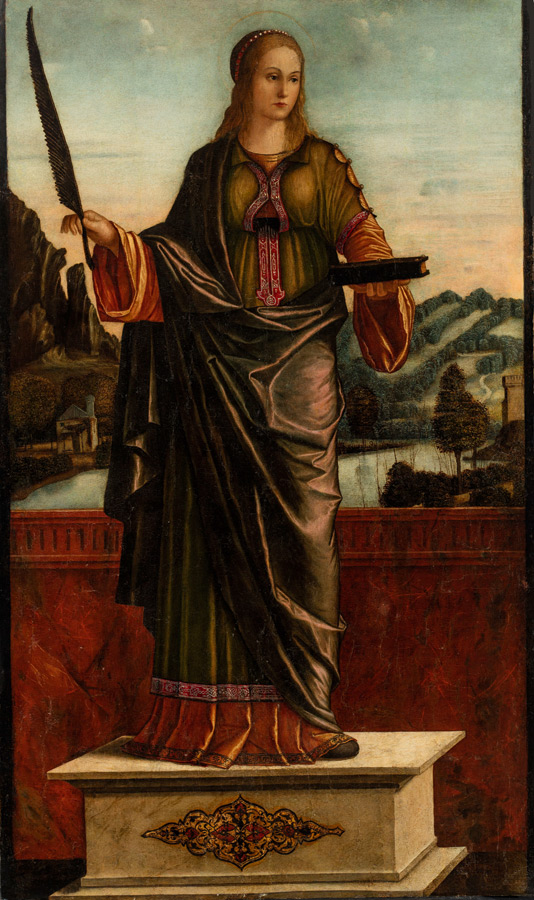
St Anastasia from the Zadar Polyptych

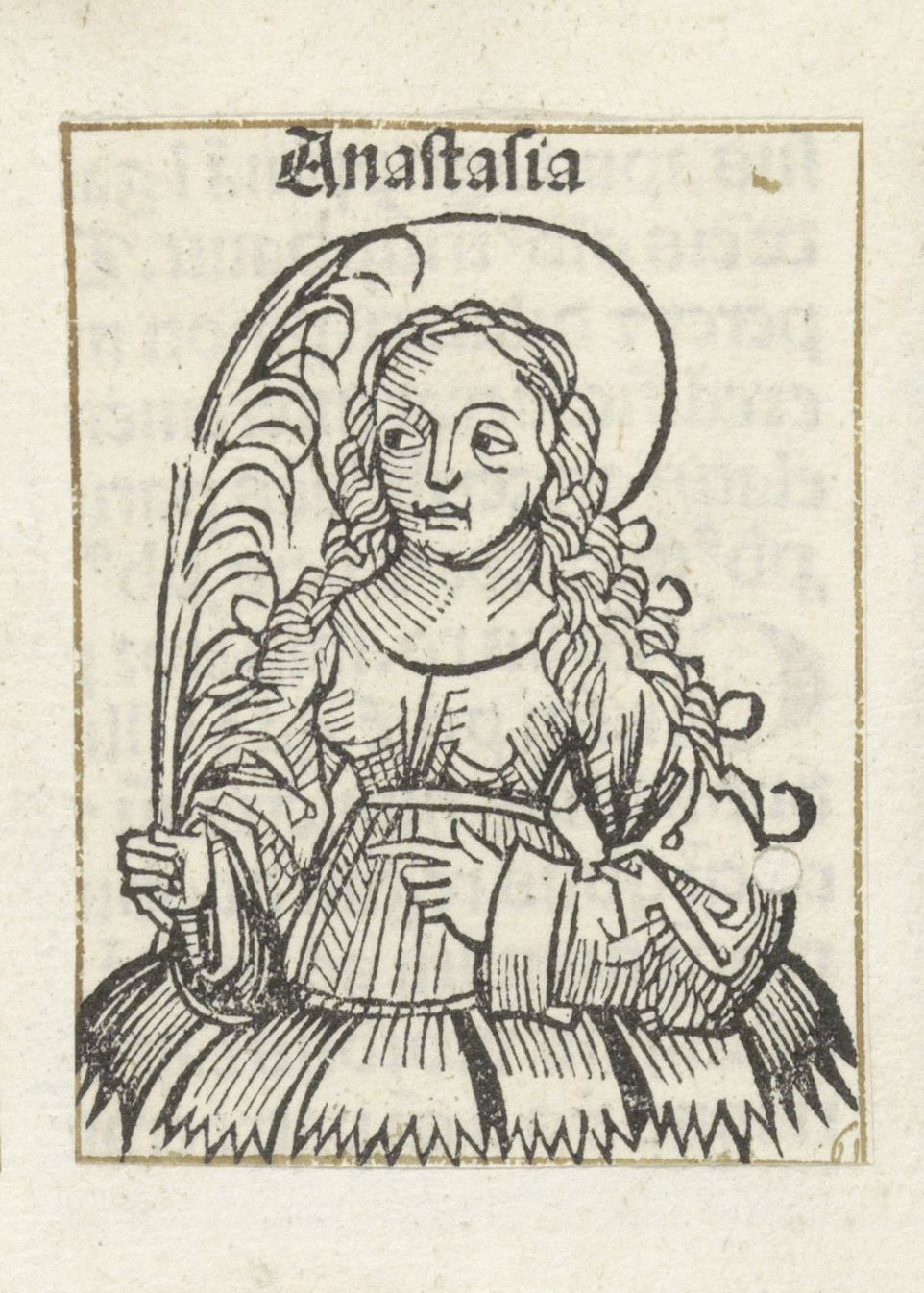
Nuremberg book illustration made via woodcut

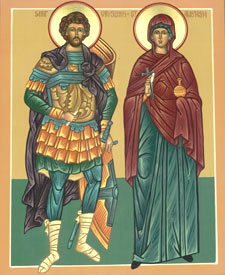
St Chrysogonus depicted with St Anastasia

== See also ==
- Saint Anastasia of Sirmium, patron saint archive
- Order of Saint Anastasia
