= Apostolos the New =

Saint Apostolos the New
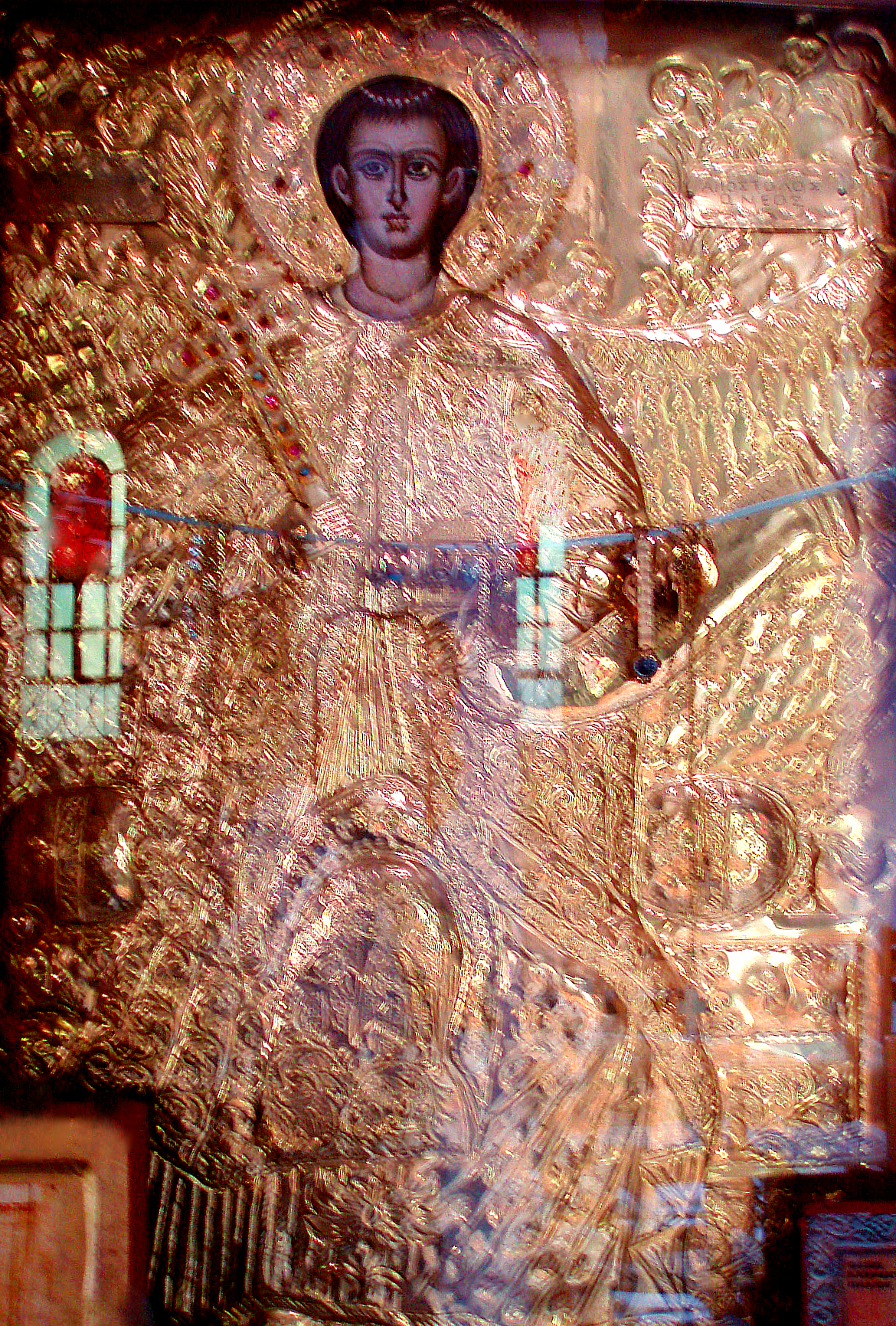
- Born: Apostolos Stamatiou (Greek: Απόστολος Σταματίου); 1667; Agios Lavrentios of Magnesia
- Died: 1686; Golden Horn
- Venerated in: Eastern Orthodox Church
- Feast: 16th of August

Apostolos the New (Greek: Άγιος Απόστολος ο Νέος), was born in Agios Lavrentios of Magnesia, Pelion, Greece, in 1667 A.D. His father was Costas Stamatiou (Greek: Κώστας Σταματίου) and his mother was Melo (Greek: Μελώ). At the age of 15 he became an orphan. In 1682 A.D., he went to Istanbul, where he worked in a tavern.

== Life ==
=== Uprising ===
According to the Greek Orthodox Church, Apostolos had already been in Constantinople for four years when the inhabitants of his homeland were oppressed under heavy taxation. Because of this, he decided to turn to the Sultan's commissioners and taught them how to reduce the tax burden. Apostolos helped his brethren set up their own committee of residents who would represent them. This was a success, but Voivode did not accept the documents of his sultan's commissioners, rejecting them as forgeries. Voivode arrested three of the residents' committee and took them to Istanbul himself, where he demanded they be imprisoned for high treason.

=== Confinement ===
When their compatriots learned of this, they sent a committee to Istanbul to address the queen mother herself (the Sultan's mother - Valide Hanoum Kiosem) to get them released. As they did not know how and where to go, Apostolos was willing to help them, since he also knew the Turkish language. He even took the report written by the residents and gave it to a top Sultan official. The official, however, had already received orders from Voivode of Pelion.

Apostolos was arrested and handed over to Voivode to be punished for his arrogance. Voivode then ordered him to be chained and asked Apostolos for a four-year Haraç for as long as he was away from his village. However, because he feared that the rest of the committee would appeal to the queen mother herself, he thought of finally leaving the three prisoners and Apostolos. But a compatriot of Apostolos, out of envy that an insignificant and poor child would be considered a benefactor of his place, slandered him that he had instigated the whole affair and that if he had set him free he would surely badmouth Voivode in the royal palace. So Voivode ordered that he be severely tortured to death.

=== The struggle for Islamization ===
After a failed attempt to escape, Voivode tried to convert Apostolos to Islam by circumcising him, but Voivode was unsuccessful.

After Apostolos declared that he was a Christian and his faith would not change, he was led to senior religious officials where they themselves tried to make him change his faith by giving him wealth and glory. Apostolos did not renounce his Christian faith. He only told them: "Don't waste your time, do whatever it takes but do it quickly. Whatever death you give me, I will willingly accept it for the sake of my Christ. So don't be late. Do you want to burn me? Let me gather the wood and prepare the fire. Do you want to hang me? Let me prepare the loop with my own hands. Do you want to behead me? Give me the sword and I will sharpen it as needed." After they didn't achieve anything, the vizier finally ordered his beheading.

=== The execution ===
After a night of torture, Apostolos was led before dawn to a location near Golden Horn where he waited for the executioner to behead him. The executioner first hit him three times in the neck with his scythe, then grabbed him by the hair and beheaded him. Apostolos died at the age of 19. Books were written about his life state that after his execution, the execution squad saw from afar a large crowd going to his dead body. Believing that they were Christians, the men ran to the site but could see nothing. Only his dead body was there and no one else. After they threw his body into the sea, they brought his head to the vizier as proof of his execution.

=== After execution ===
Christians who had seen his execution demanded his head so that it be buried, through the patriarchate. When it was given to them, they put it in a silver case and gave it to the Temple of Agios Dimitrios in Kurtuluş.

Sometime later, a compatriot of Apostolos took his head and carried it to his homeland, specifically to the Apostolos's house (which had now become a temple in his honor). Today, his head is in the Diocese of Dimitriada, Magnesia.

== Veneration ==
Eastern Orthodox Church considered him a saint and he was commemorated on August 16.
