= Feriköy Cemetery =

Muslim cemetery in Istanbul

- Interactive map of Feriköy Cemetery

Details
- Location: Feriköy, Şişli, Istanbul
- Country: Turkey
- Coordinates: 41°02′54″N 28°58′18″E Feriköy Cemetery (Istanbul)
- Type: Public
- Owned by: Istanbul Metropolitan Municipality

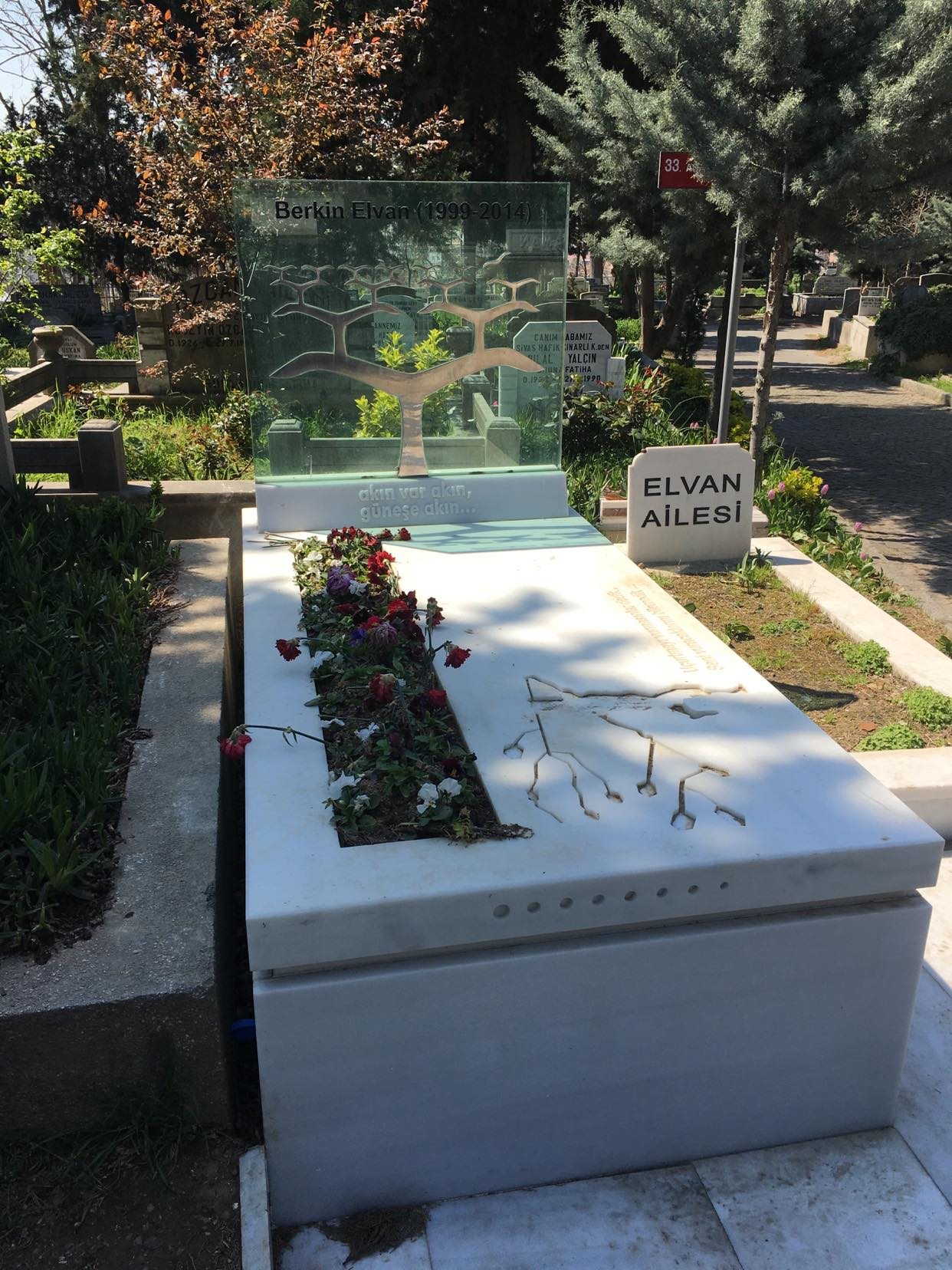

The Feriköy Cemetery (Turkish: Feriköy Mezarlığı) is a burial ground situated in Feriköy quarter of Şişli district in the European part of Istanbul, Turkey. It is administered by the Metropolitan Municipality. Many prominent figures from the world of politics, sports and arts rest here.

== Notable burials ==
Listed in alphabetical order of surnames:

- Ahmet Ağaoğlu (1869–1939), Azerbaijani and Turkish publicist and journalist,
- Ahmet Berman (1932–1980), footballer,
- Ahmet Mete Işıkara (1941–2013), geophysicist and earthquake scientist,
- Albay Mehmet Şefik Aker (1877/1888-1964
- Ali Sami Yen (1886–1951), sports official, founder of the football club Galatasaray,
- Aydemir Akbaş (1936 - 2024) Turkish screenwriter and actor
- Ayseli Göksoy (1935–2022), painter, women's rights activist and politician,
- Berkin Elvan (1999–2014), a boy, who was killed by police with a tear-gas can during the June 2013 anti-government protests in Turkey,
- Coşkun Kırca (1927–2005), diplomat, journalist and politician,
- Çetin Alp (1947–2004), pop music singer,
- Erol Günaydın (1933–2012), theater and film actor,
- Faize Ergin (1894–1954), Tanbur player and composer of Ottoman classical music,
- Fatma Aliye Topuz (1862–1936), novelist, columnist, essayist, women's rights activist and humanitarian,
- Feridun Buğeker (1933–2014), footballer,
- Fuat Köseraif (1872–1949), Turkish linguist,
- Eylül Cansın (1992–2015), transgender woman,
- Kadri Aytaç (1931–2003), football player and manager,
- Keriman Halis Ece (1913–2012), beauty pageant titleholder, pianist, and fashion model,
- Khalil bey Khasmammadov, (1873–1947) Azerbaijani politician and diplomat.
- Mihri Belli (1915–2011), leader of the socialist movement in Turkey,
- Oya Kayacık (1938–2020), Turkish philanthropist, orphanage woman nurse,
- Sami Frashëri (1850–1904), Albanian writer, philosopher, playwright,
- Suat Derviş (1905–1972), female novelist, journalist, and political activist,
- Süleyman Seba (1926–2014), football player and president of the football club Beşiktaş J.K.,
- Turgut Özatay (1927–2002), film actor,
- Zafer Önen (1921–2013), film actor,

=== Latin quarter ===
- Leon Walerian Ostroróg (1867–1932), international jurist of Polish descent who died in London

== See also ==
- Feriköy Protestant Cemetery
