= Fuat Köseraif =

Turkish soldier and linguist

Mehmet Fuat Köseraif (born 1872, Istanbul – d. April 23, 1949, Istanbul), was a Turkish soldier and linguist. He is regarded as one of the pioneers of extreme Turkism in language. He was fluent in German, French, and English.

== Life ==
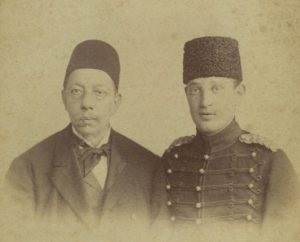
Fuat Köseraif with his father Köse Mehmed Raif Pasha

Fuat Köseraif was born in Istanbul in 1872, as the son of Köse Mehmed Raif Pasha, one of the viziers during the reign of Sultan Abdulhamid II. After attending Galatasaray High School for a while, he went to Vienna for high school education in 1886. In 1891, he entered the Military Academy in Kassel. While in Germany, he embraced Turkism by reading the works of the famous Turkologist Arminius Vambery. He returned to Istanbul in 1893 as a Prussian Army artillery lieutenant and was appointed as a teacher to the model artillery battalions as the Sultan’s adjutant with the rank of captain. Upon returning to the country, he met with prominent Turkish nationalists such as Necib Âsım, Veled Çelebi, and Mehmet Emin, and developed a special interest in linguistic matters. From 1895 onwards, he wrote various articles on language purification in the newspaper İkdam. He was among the founders of the Turkish Association, established after the 1908 Second Constitutional Era. In his articles for the Turkish Association magazine, he advocated for replacing Arabic and Persian words in the language with old Turkish words and deriving new equivalents from Turkic roots and suffixes. He used archaic words such as sayru for hasta (ill), biti for mektup (letter), yazma for kalem (pen), tanlak for şafak (dawn), and ozan for şair (poet). Additionally, he proposed the idea that Turkish words could be derived even with inactive or newly created suffixes. For these ideas, he was criticized by Ziya Gökalp as the “leader of purificationism”. Nevertheless, Köseraif's approach influenced the Öztürkçe movement that gained momentum after the proclamation of the Republic. During the First Turkish Language Congress held in 1932, he emphasized the necessity of collecting words from dialects and Turkish vernaculars through compilation and scanning efforts. He supported the Language Reform with his articles in the journals Öz Dilimize Doğru, Yeni Türk, and Türk Dili. In 1936, he published Turkish Mani Manuscripts, a book he translated from Albert von Le Coq. In 1942, he became a member of the central board of the Turkish Language Association and was appointed head of the etymology department. In the same year, he participated in efforts to Turkify constitutional terms.

== Death ==
Fuat Köseraif died in Istanbul on April 23, 1949. His grave is in Istanbul Feriköy Cemetery.
