= Herkül Millas =

- Ηρακλής Μήλλας
- Born: 1940 (age 85–86); Ankara, Turkey
- Occupations: Writer, academic, translator, civil engineer

Herkül Millas (Greek: Ηρακλής Μήλλας,English-language sources refer to Hercules Millas (born 1940 in Ankara), is an author, academician, translator, and civil engineer of Greek extraction whose family originates from Istanbul where he was raised too. Hercules Millas is famous for his research on Turkish-Greek relations, mutual images, nationalism, national identity, historiography, and translation work from Greek and Turkish literature.

== Early Life and Education ==
Herkül Millas was born in 1940 in Ankara, but he grew up in Istanbul. He received his basic education from the Feriköy Greek Elementary School; he then received his intermediate, high school, and university educations at Robert College, which is the precursor to today's Boğaziçi University, obtaining his degree as a civil engineer in 1965. In addition, Millas was also interested in athletics and in 1962 he won the first place in the 100 meters and 200 meters races in Turkey.

In his student days, he was involved in the students' movement during the 60s and became a member of the Workers’ Party of Turkey (TİP) in 1962. He fulfilled his military duty as a sergeant in Muş.

== Engineering Career ==
After completion of his university studies, he served as an engineer at the Aliağa Refinery from 1968 to 1970. After the military memorandum of 1971, he moved to Athens.

He spent the next fifteen years working as a geotechnical engineer in Greece, Bahrain, Qatar, and Indonesia, while in Saudi Arabia, he set up his own research and consultancy firm. He gave up his career in engineering in 1986 and became involved in academia and culture.

== Academic Career ==
Maintaining his enthusiasm for literary matters even while studying engineering, Millas started translating poetry and novels between the two languages of Greek and Turkish. During 1990 and 1995, he was involved in setting up the Department of Contemporary Greek Language and Literature at the Ankara University Faculty of Languages, History and Geography, teaching languages, literature, and history classes there. In the same years, he earned his master's and doctorate degrees in political science from the Ankara University Faculty of Political Science, with the latter being awarded in 1998. The doctorate dissertation of the subject is on National Identities and the ‘Other’ in Turkish and Greek Novels.

He lectured on the teaching of Turkish language, Turkish literature, and Turkish political history in the Universities of Macedonia in Thessaloniki, the University of the Aegean in Rhodes, and the National and Kapodistrian University of Athens between 1999 and 2008. During 2009–2010, he was a guest lecturer for the subject of text analysis and Turkish-Greek relations in the context of conflict resolution in Işık University and Bilgi University, both in Istanbul.

In 2002 to 2004, he worked as a mediator in the European Commission-funded Turkish-Greek Civil Society Dialogue Project. During 2006-2012, in the frame of "Education Program for Muslim Children" (PEM), which was supported by the EU, he organized the Turkish language instruction for Greek teachers instructing the children of the Turkish minority of Western Thrace; 350-650 teachers enrolled in the program annually, while Millas himself also edited a Turkish textbook within this framework.

== Works and Areas of Study ==
The majority of Millas' writings relate to historiography, political science, literature, languages, national identity, textbooks, and Turkey-Greece relations. He has written more than twenty books which have been published in Turkish, Greek, and English. These include:

- Yunan Edebiyatında Türk İmajı (Turkish)
- Geçmişten Bugüne Yunanlılar: Dil, Din ve Kimlikleri (2003)
- "Öteki" ve Kimlik: Türk ve Yunan Romanlarında Ulusal Kimlik (2005)
- Yunan Ulusunun Doğuşu
- Ayvalık ve Venezis
- Türkçe-Yunanca Ortak Kelimeler, Deyimler ve Atasözleri (2008) – A work bringing together over six thousand common words and idioms between Turkish and Greek.
- Türkçe Kitabımız: Batı Trakya'nın Edebiyatı, Gazete ve Dergi Metinleri (2008, editor)
- Zamandan Bir Ses (2009)
- Sözde Masum Milliyetçilik (2010, editor)
- In English, National Myths in Greece (2023) and Nations and Identities: The Case of Greeks and Turks (Istanbul Bilgi University Press, 2016)

Additionally, his book 'National Myths in Greece' was reviewed alongside an article in the Greek newspaper 'Efimerida ton Syntakton', where he was described as being a "political scientist and civil engineer", and that the book explores the myths of religion, antiquity, and language in Greece from a multidisciplinary approach.

Millas translated the writings of Greek poets such as Yannis Ritsos, George Seferis, Constantine Cavafy, Odysseas Elytis, and Nikos Gatsos, as well as the writings of other authors such as Ilias Venezis and Rea Galanaki, into Turkish and translated the poems of Turkish poets like Yunus Emre and Can Yücel into Greek language. His translations number more than twenty volumes.

In 2021, he published his novel named 'Aile Mezarı' (Family Grave) about a Greek family who had to move from Istanbul and received the Orhan Kemal Literature Prize for the same novel.

== Documentary Work ==
Working along with Nefin Dinç, the director, he made the documentary "Öteki Kasaba" (The Other Town) in 2011. This documentary shows how Turks and Greeks look at each other. The documentary received Audience Award at Thessaloniki Film Festival (2011), Special Award at Boston Turkish Film Festival (2012), and the Best Historical Documentary Award at Chicago Greek Film Fest (2012).

== Journalism ==
Millas' writings included commentaries on Turkish-Greek relations and Turkish policy for the newspaper 'Zaman', which is based in Istanbul, throughout the years; his columns still appear in different papers and websites of Greece and Turkey.

== Awards ==
- Abdi İpekçi Peace and Friendship Award (1992 and 2001 – twice)
- Athens Translators Association Award (1996)
- Hellenic Authors' Society Dido Sotiriou Award (2004)
- Turkish Publishers Association Freedom of Thought and Expression Award (2005)
- Various film festival awards with the documentary Öteki Kasaba (2011–2012)
- Orhan Kemal Literature Prize, for his novel Aile Mezarı (2021)

== Personal Life ==
Millas is married to Evy his wife, and they have two sons and four grandchildren. By stating that his responses on how he identifies himself have changed over time, Millas explains that he is a Greek man born in Ankara who moved to Greece in 1971, and that he has integrated in Turkey and Greece. Continuing with his passion for sports even in his old age, he won first place in the 100-meter race and the high jump competitions for the masters’ category in Greece in 2016 and 2019.
