= Ergin =

Ergin is a Turkish masculine given name and surname. Notable people with the name include:

== Given name ==
- Ergin Ataman (born 1966), Turkish basketball coach
- Ergin Keleş (born 1987), Turkish footballer

== Surname ==
- Ayşegül Ergin, Turkish female Taekwondo practitioner
- Doğukan Ergin (born 1992), Dutch politician
- Ertuğ Ergin, Turkish alternative pop-rock singer-songwriter
- Faize Ergin (1894–1954), Turkish female tanbur player and Ottoman Classical Music composer
- Kazım Ergin (1915–2002), Turkish geophysicist
- Sadullah Ergin (born 1964), Turkish politician
- Tarik Ergin (born 1961), Turkish-American actor
- Yusuf Ergin (born 1984), Turkish athlete
