= Pangaltı Catholic Cemetery =

Cemetery in Şişli, Istanbul

Pangaltı Latin Catholic Cemetery
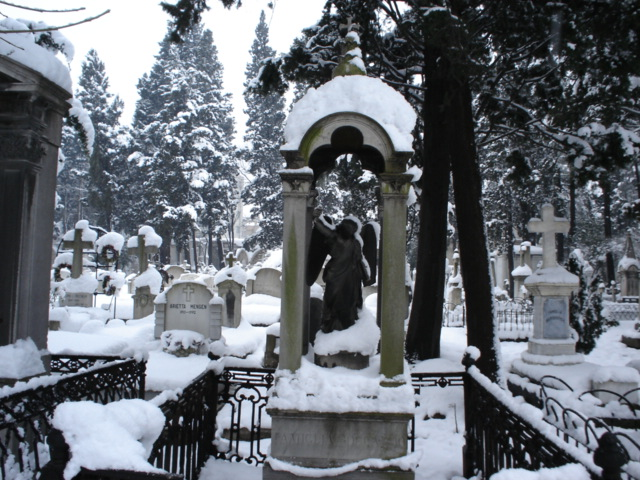
- An angel from the cemetery during a snowstorm in 2005
- Interactive map of Pangaltı Latin Catholic Cemetery

Details
- Established: 1863
- Location: Feriköy, Şişli, Istanbul
- Country: Turkey
- Coordinates: 41.05330°N 28.98528°E
- Type: Catholic cemetery
- Style: 19th century European

Pangaltı Roman Catholic Cemetery (Turkish: Pangaltı Fransız Latin Katolik Mezarlığı), also known as Feriköy Latin Catholic Cemetery (Turkish: Feriköy Latin Katolik Mezarlığı), is a historic Christian cemetery in Istanbul, Turkey. It is the largest Catholic cemetery in Istanbul. The cemetery is located in the Feriköy neighborhood of the Şişli district, nearly 3 km (1.9 mi) north of Taksim Square. The main Protestant burial ground of the city; Feriköy Protestant Cemetery, Istanbul lies immediately across the Catholic cemetery. The two neighboring cemeteries are divided by the Abide-i Hürriyet Avenue.

== History and description ==
The origins of the cemetery date back to 1853, when the Ottoman government declared that the graveyard of the Franks at Pera was no longer suitable as a burial ground. A new site was granted near the Imperial War Academy (Ottoman Turkish: Mekteb-i Harbiye-i Şâhâne) in Pangaltı as a cemetery for Istanbul's Protestant and Catholic communities. This initiative was aimed towards clearing ground for urban development in the Beyoğlu area. Four years later, the allotted space was deemed insufficient for the dead of both communities, and a second grant was issued by order of Sultan Abdülmecid I in 1857.

Between 1840 and 1910, the area of Istanbul stretching northward from Taksim to Şişli was transformed from open countryside to densely inhabited residential settlement. Early 19th century maps of Istanbul show much of the area in this direction taken up by the non-Muslim burial grounds of the Grand Champs des Morts, with the Frankish section directly in the path of the main route of expansion, including the widening of the main road running from Taksim to Pangaltı. Due to this reason, the human remains were exhumed from the old Frankish burial ground in the Grand Champs des Morts and they were transferred, along with their grave markers, to its current location in 1863–1864 in Feriköy for re-interment.

The burial ground is separated by six squares and alleys with names of saints, extending from east to west. The ornate mausoleums of the great Levantine families are located in the west (Corpi, Botter, Tubini, Glavany). Several monuments have been erected in honour of the French and Italian soldiers died during the Crimean War (1853–1856).

The ossuary is made from reclaimed gravestones in old cemeteries of the Petits-Champs and Grand Champs at Pera in the 1850s.

The cemetery is used by various Catholic communities. The tombstones of Levantines are the most numerous, featuring monuments of Greek Catholic, Armenian Catholic, Syriac Catholic, Chaldean and Melkite churches. There are other Catholic cemeteries in Istanbul, especially in the city districts of Kadıköy, Prinkipos and Büyükdere.

== Gallery ==
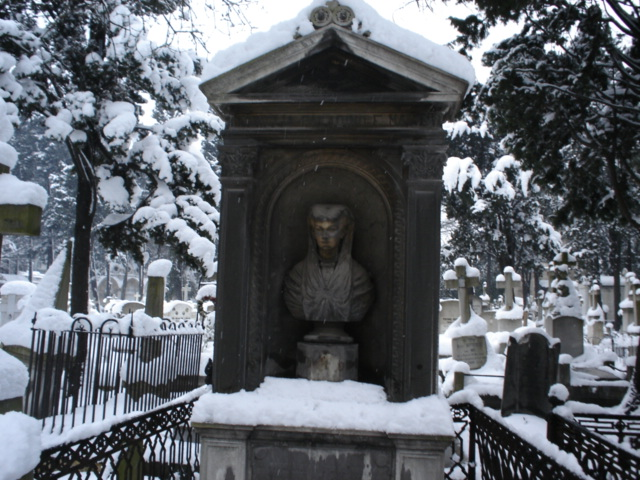
Pangaltı Latin Catholic Cemetery

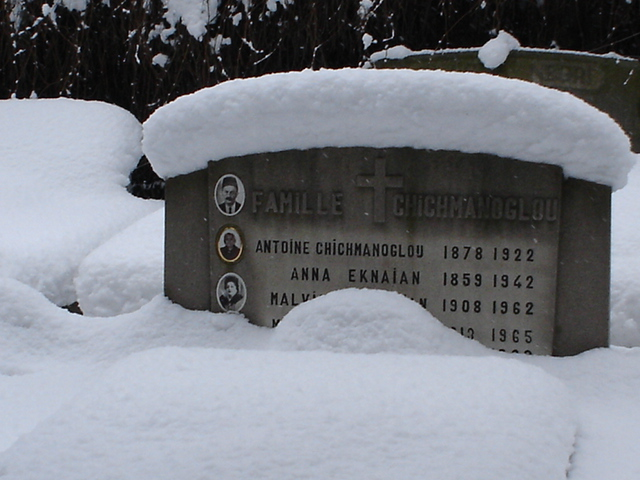
Ottoman-Armenian family with deceased male wearing a fez

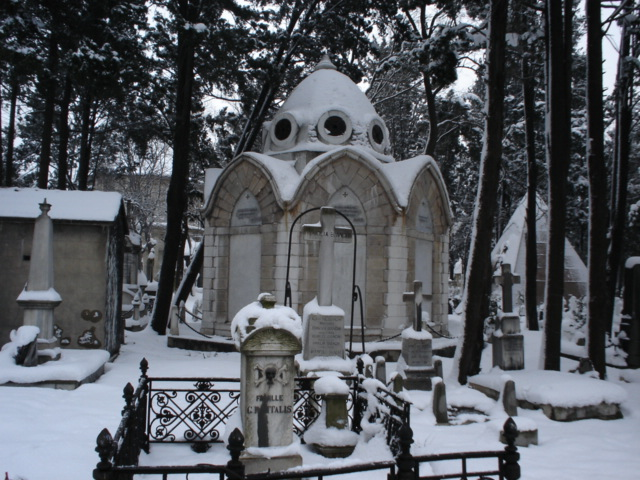
The cemetery during a snow storm in 2005

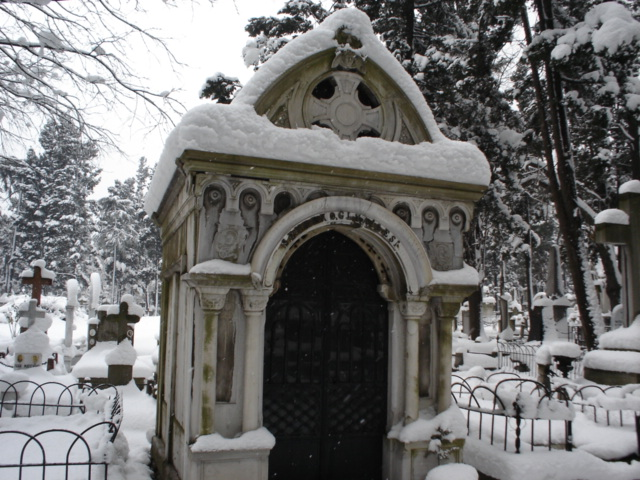
Old family mausoleum

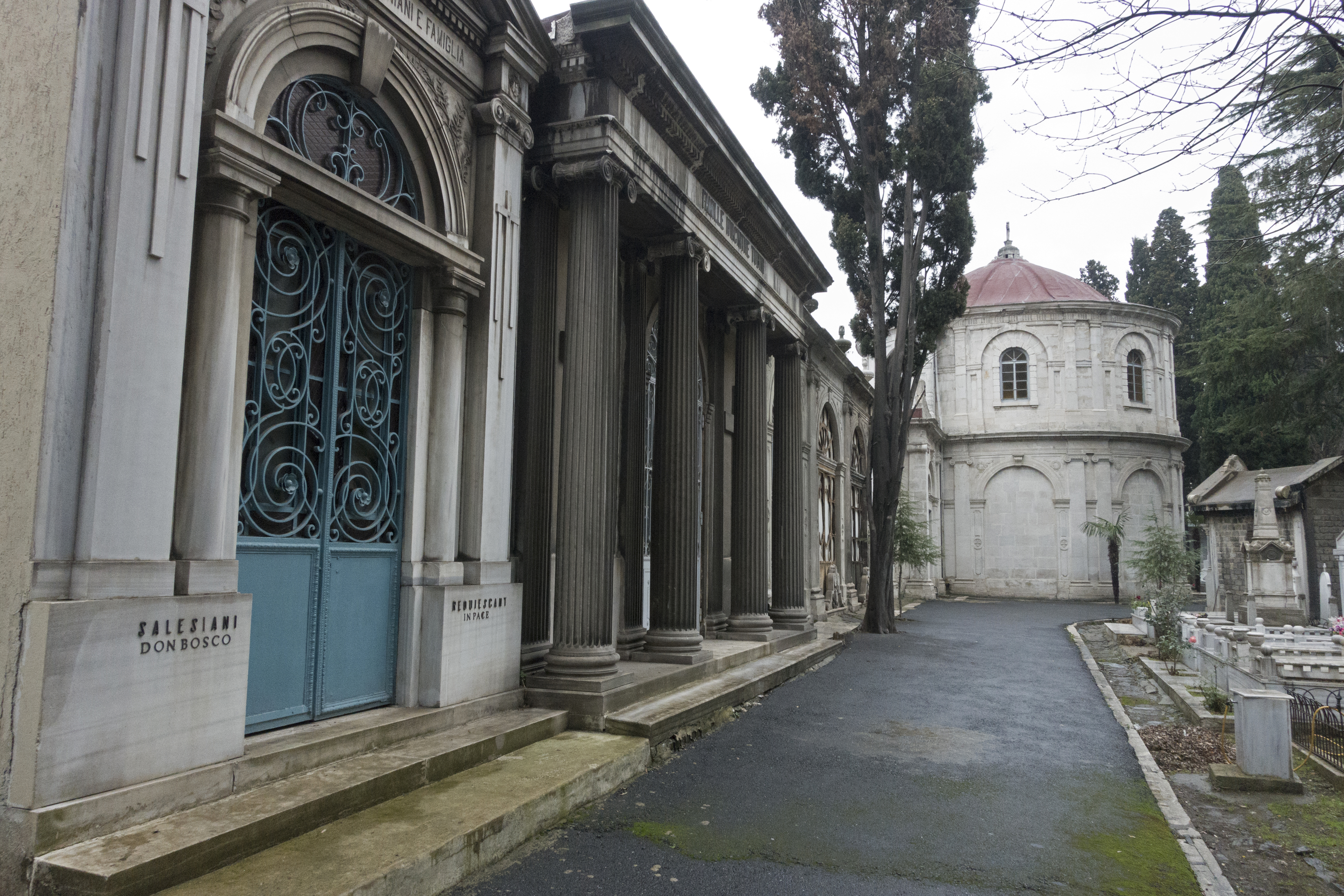
Pangalti Catholic cemetery general view

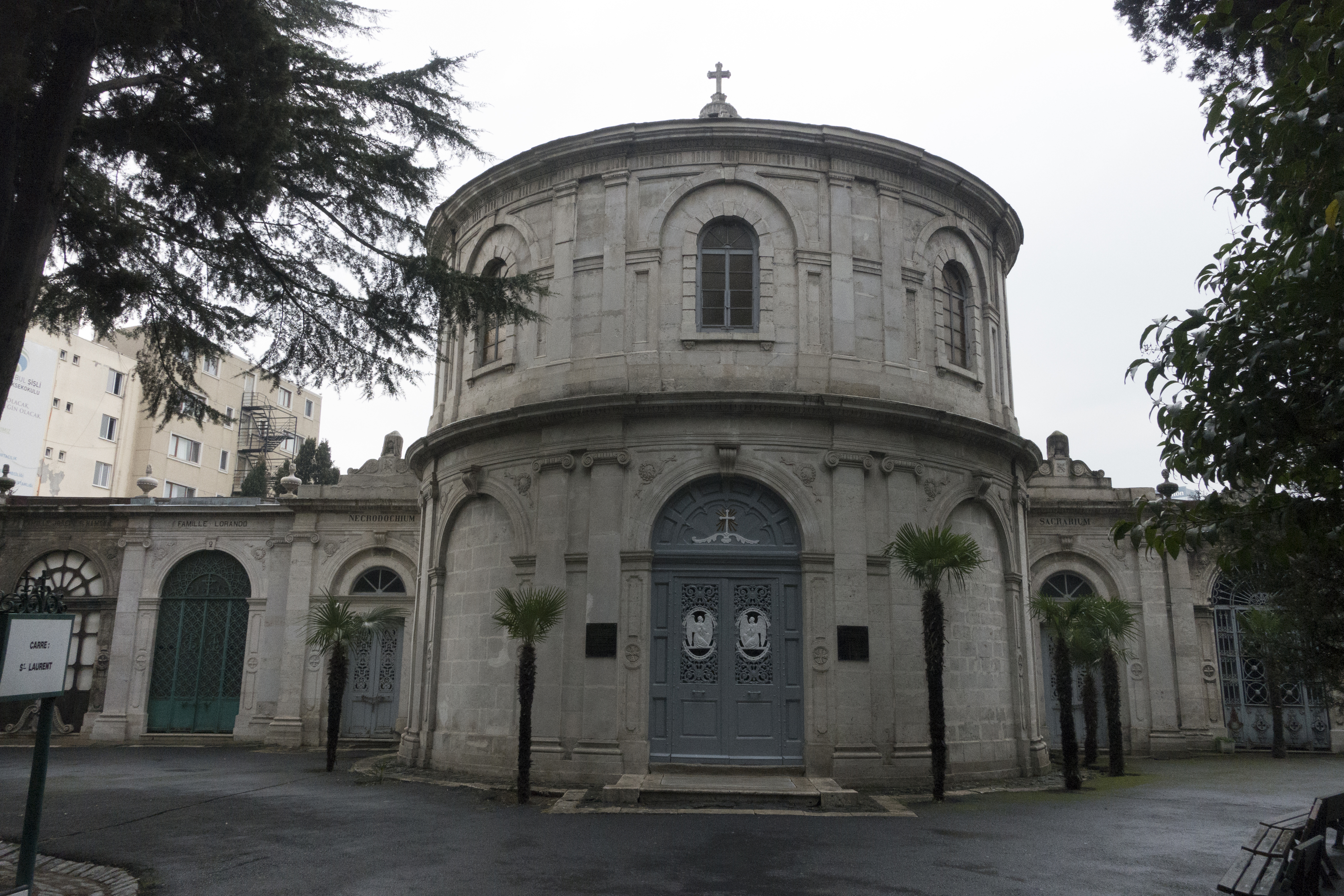
Pangalti Catholic cemetery Chapel

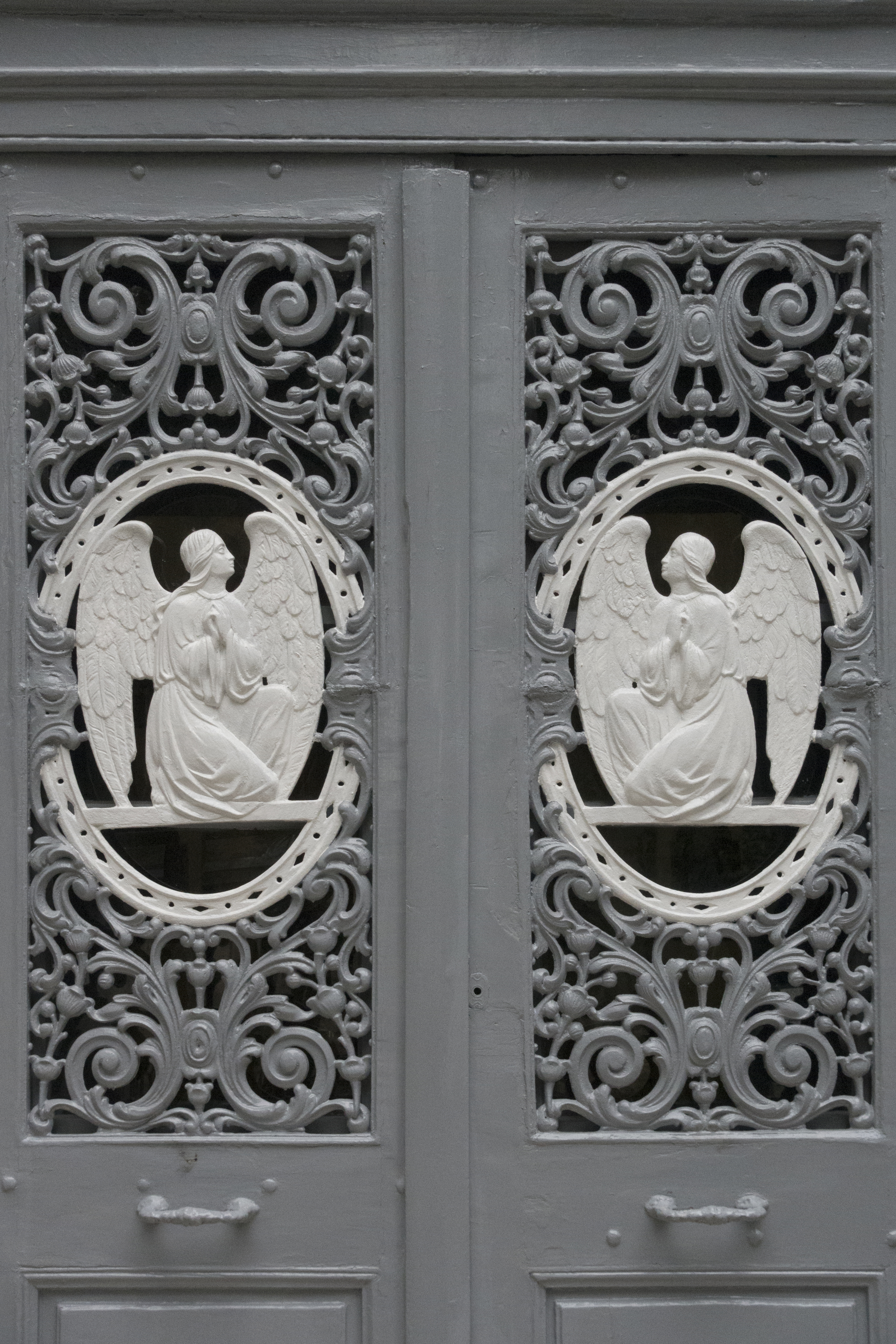
Pangalti Catholic cemetery Detail of doors

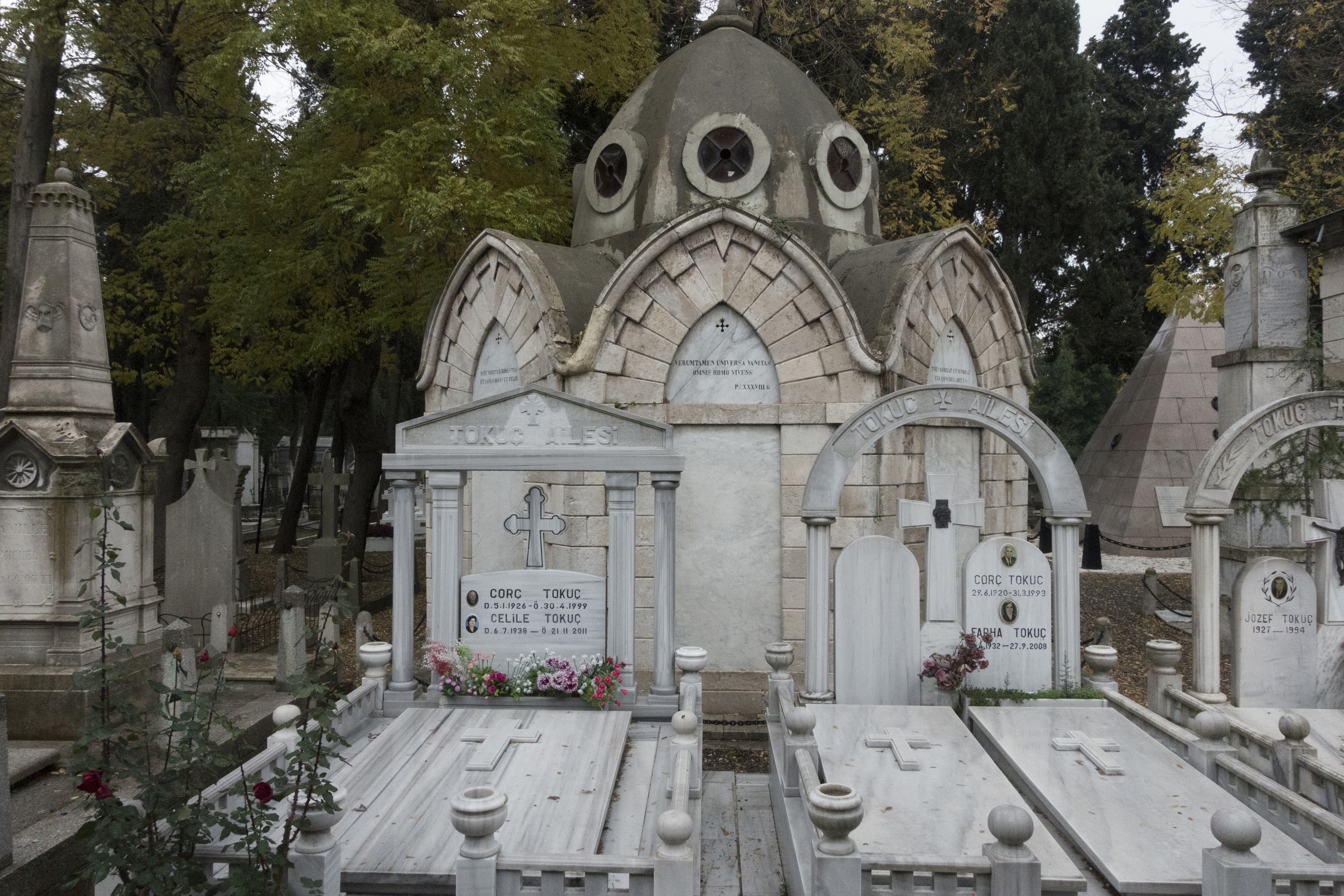
Pangalti Catholic cemetery Family grave

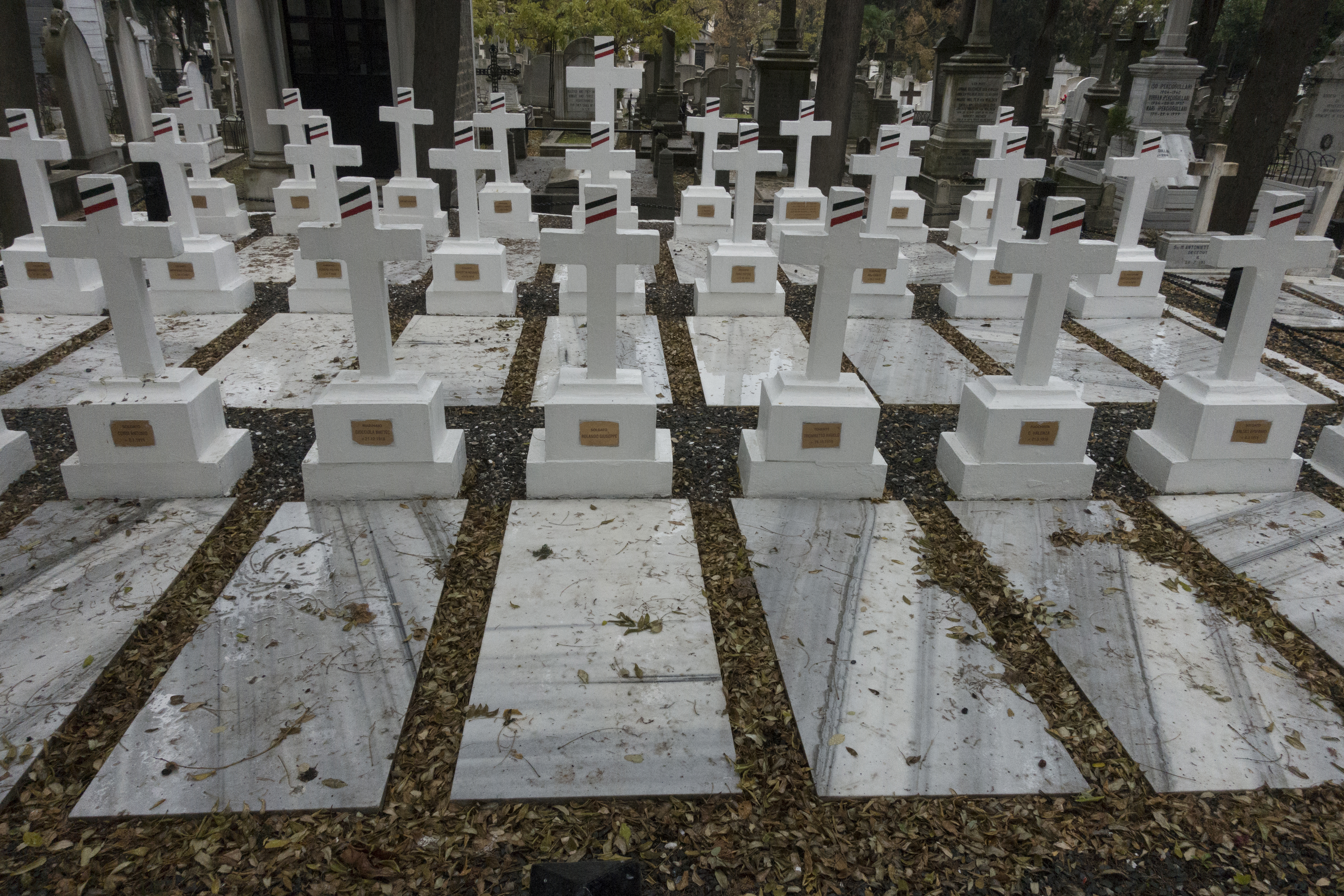
Pangalti Catholic cemetery Italian military graves

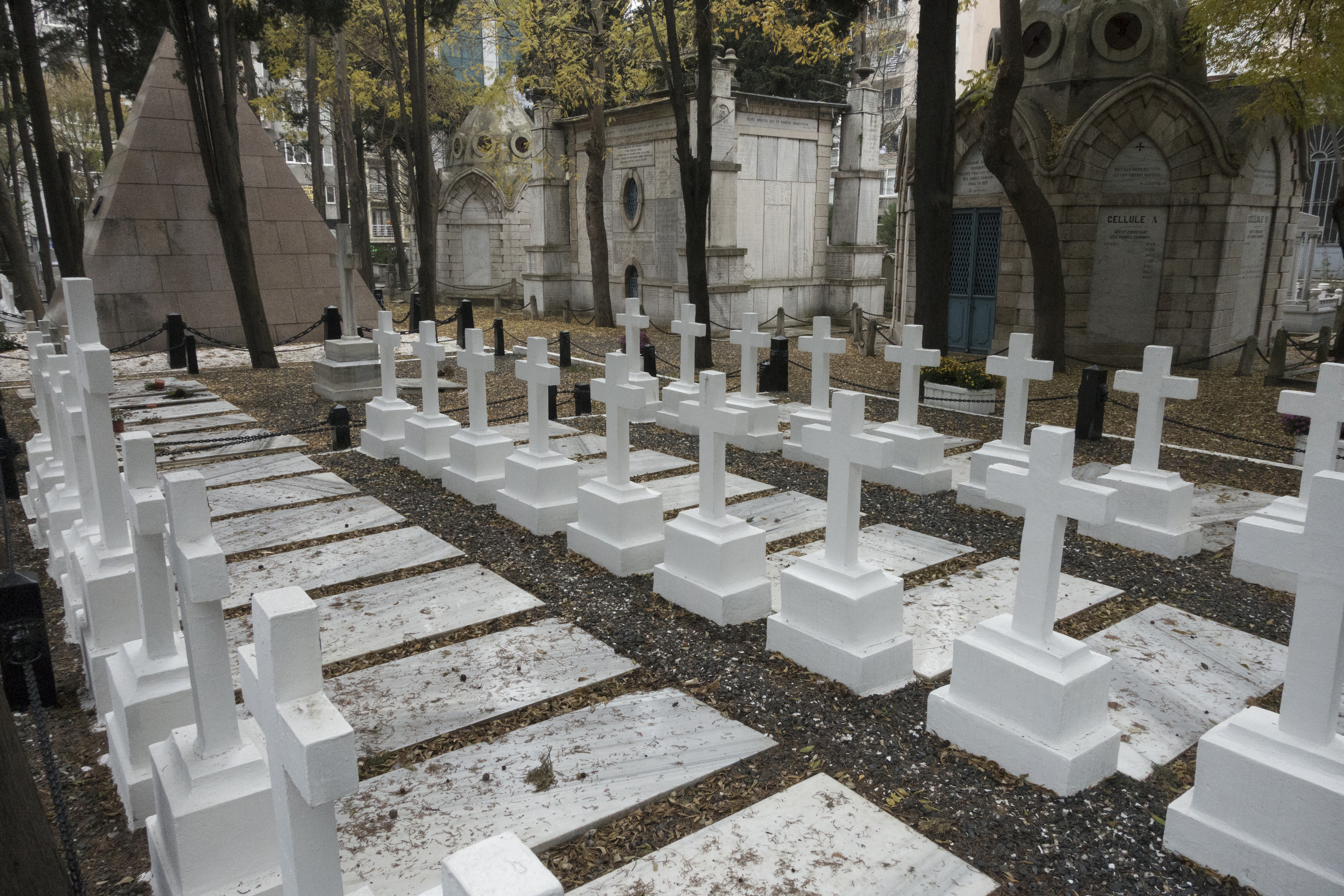
Pangalti Catholic cemetery Pyramid in view

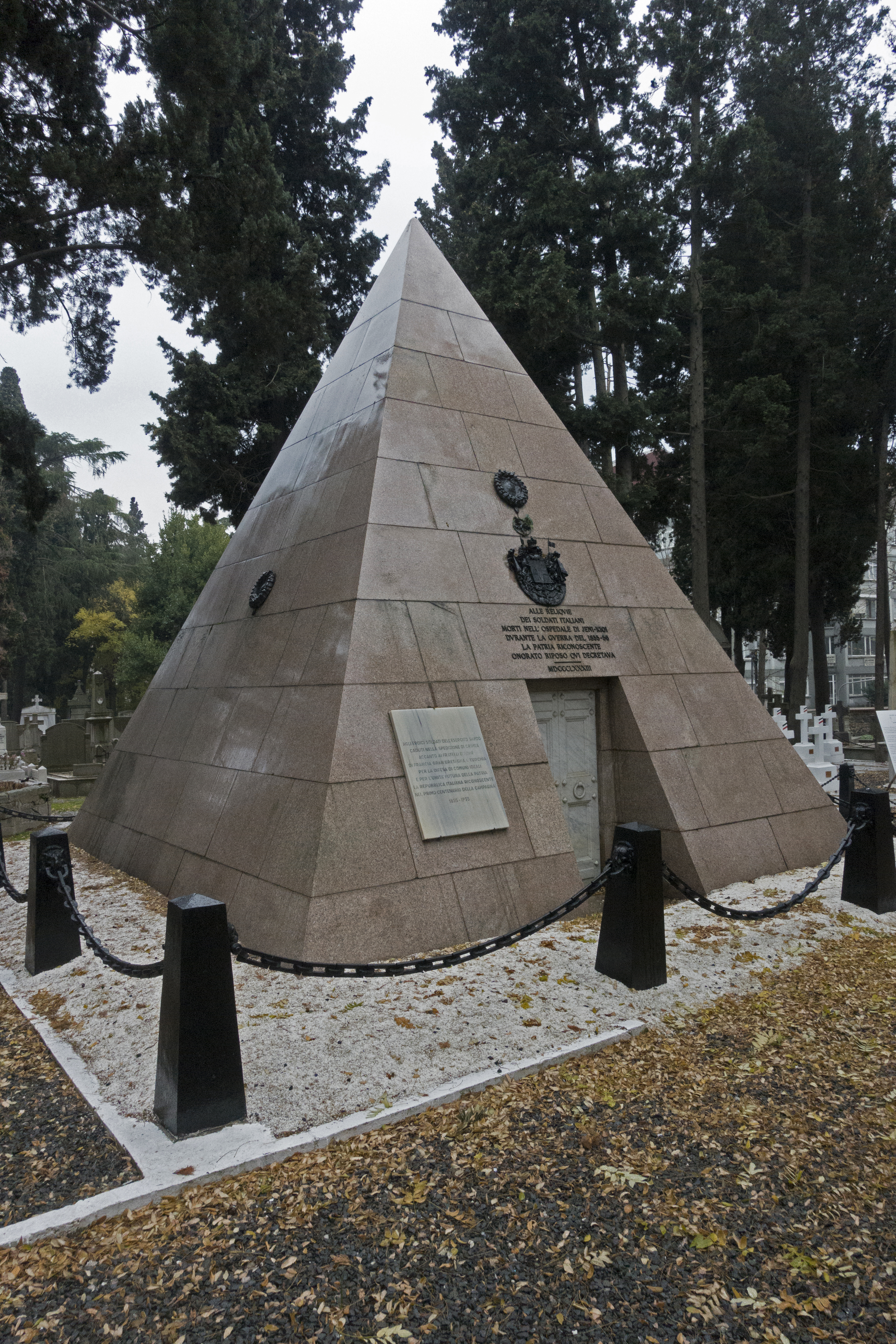
Pangalti Catholic cemetery Pyramidal ossuary

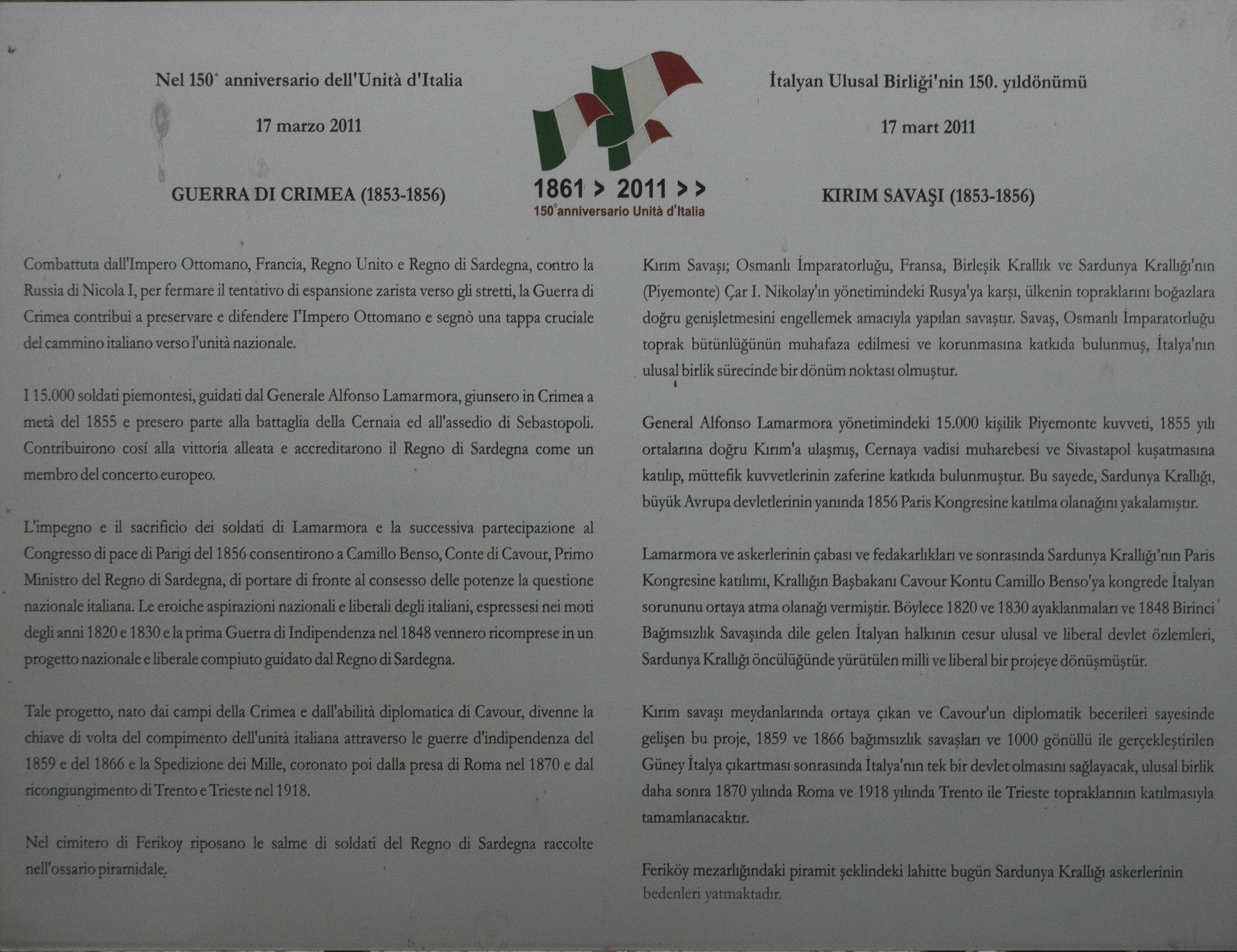
Pangalti Catholic cemetery Notice ad pyramid

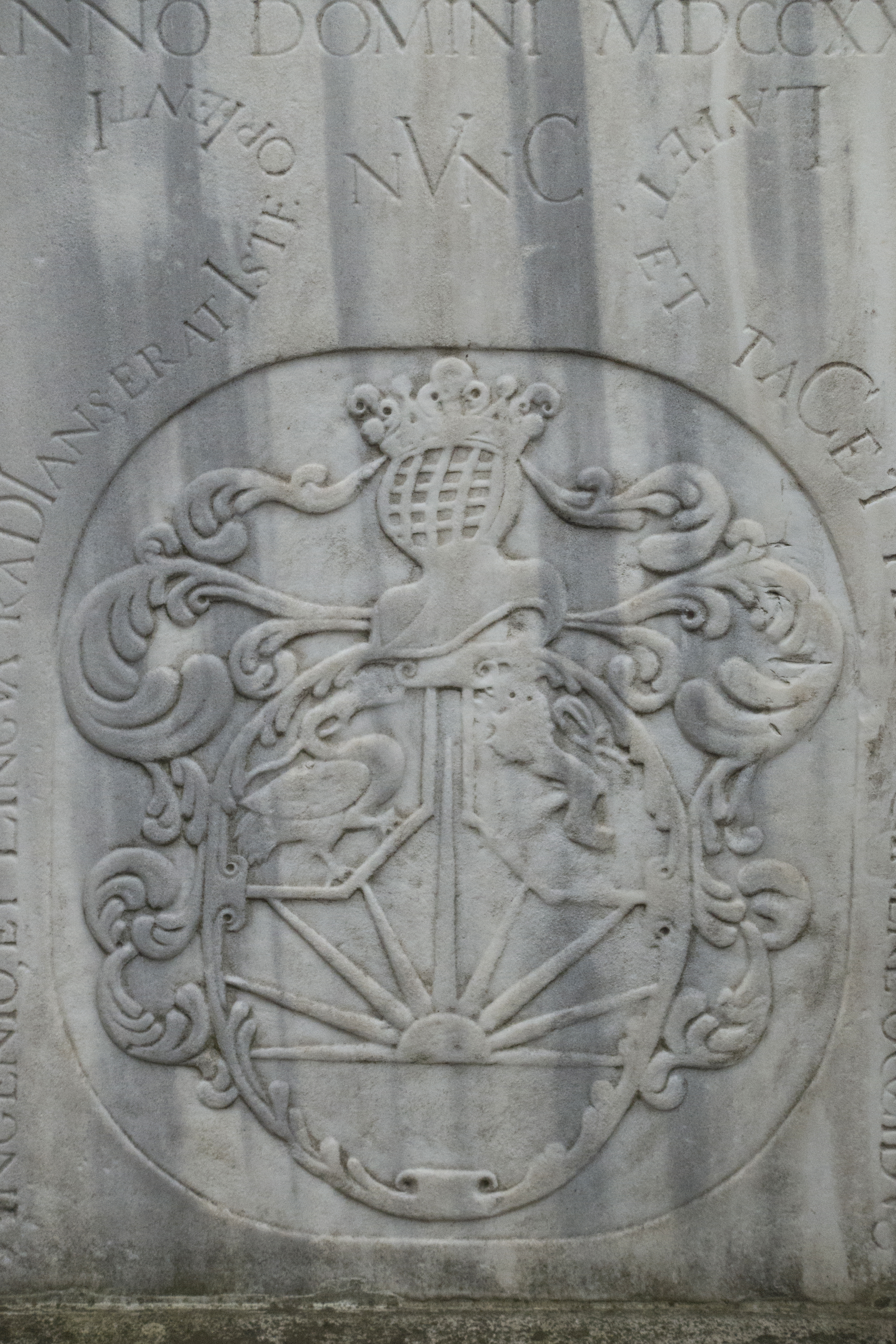
Pangalti Catholic cemetery Old gravestone

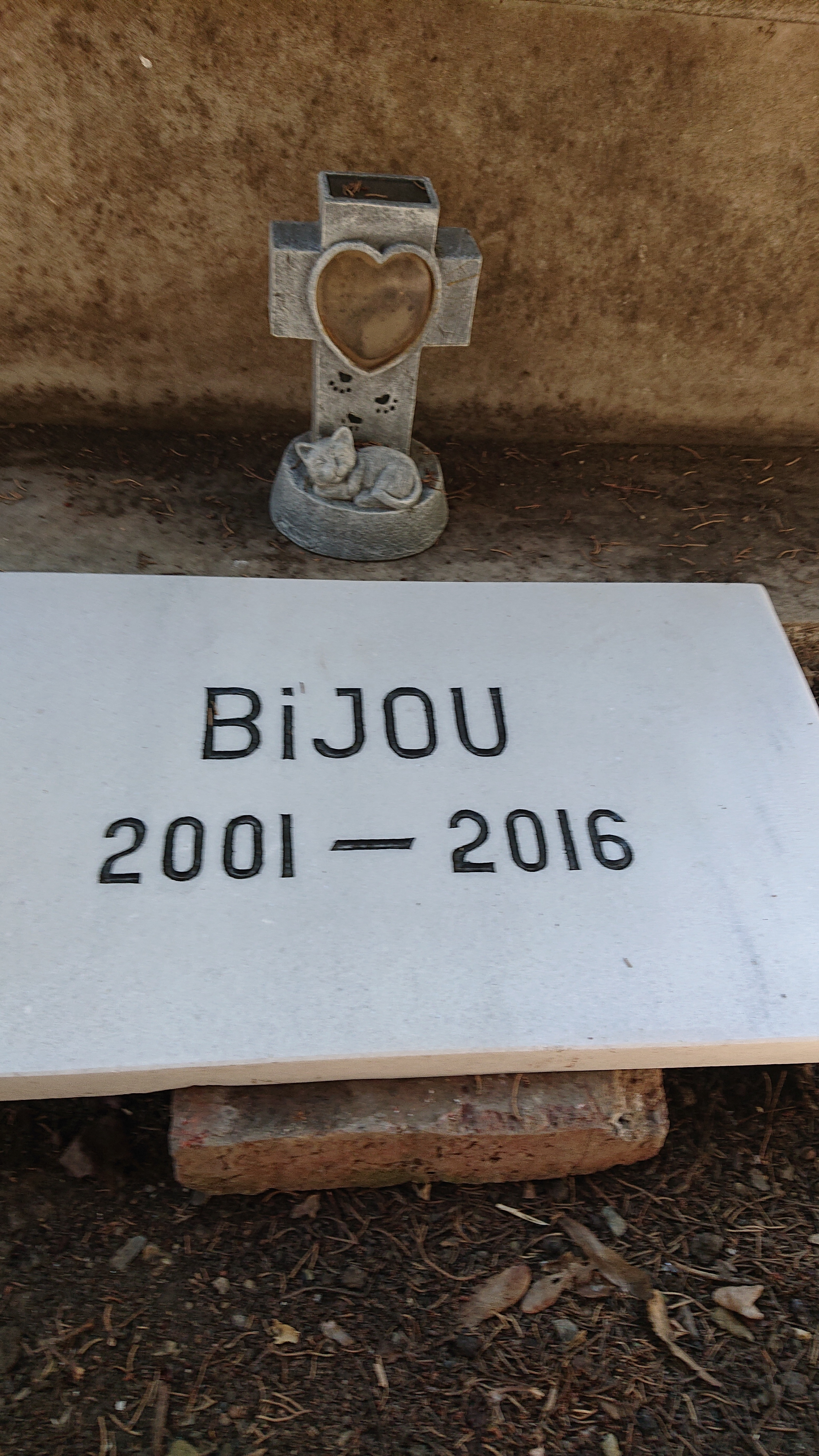
Pangaltı Catholic cemetery Cat grave

== See also ==
- Pangaltı
- Feriköy Protestant Cemetery, Istanbul
- Pangaltı Armenian Cemetery
