= Erol Günaydın =

Turkish actor (1933-2012)

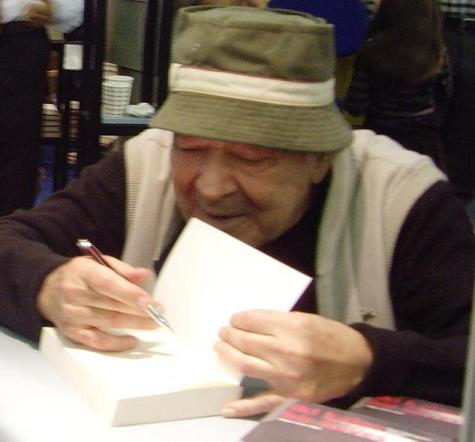
- Erol Günaydın signing his biography (2007)
- Born: 16 April 1933; Akçaabat, Trabzon, Turkey
- Died: 15 October 2012 (aged 79); Istanbul, Turkey
- Resting place: Feriköy Cemetery, Istanbul
- Education: Galatasaray High School
- Occupations: Actor, screenwriter
- Spouse: Güneş Günaydın (died 2005)
- Children: 3 daughters
- Writing career
- Notable awards: Antalya Golden Orange Award for Best Screenplay, Antalya Golden Orange Award for Best Supporting Actor

Erol Günaydın (16 April 1933 – 15 October 2012) was a Turkish theater and film actor, as well as a renowned showman famous particularly for his portrayal of Nasreddin Hoca and his performances in the traditional Turkish meddah (one-man shows).

== Biography ==
Erol Günaydın started his professional acting career in 1955 with the play "The priest ran away", staged at Haldun Dormen Pocket Theater. Active in theater since 1955 and in cinema since 1960, he celebrated his golden jubilee together with the fortieth anniversary of his marriage with spouse Güneş Günaydın, a native of Manisa, in company of his children, one of whom married into an Italian family.

Erol Günaydın was born in Akçaabat, Trabzon Province, and became involved in theater while he was a student in Galatasaray High School. He played in a very varied range of plays and character roles in films since then and became nationally famous especially once he also started appearing in TV shows on a frequent basis, first as the Turkish voice of Yogi Bear, and then in his Nasreddin Hoca and meddah shows, with also a leading role in the very successful TV serial "Çiçek Taxi". He is one of the best known faces in Turkey's world of performing arts.

His memoirs, put in writing in the form of long interview with the journalist Emine Algan, were published in 2007. He also voiced Carl Fredericksen in the Turkish dub of the 2009 Pixar film Up.

== Death ==
Erol Günaydın died on 15 October 2012 in a hospital in Istanbul. On 24 August he had been admitted to hospital with dyspnea, in an intensive care unit in Bodrum. Being without consciousness, Günaydın was transferred to Istanbul by air ambulance on 22 September. Günaydın's death was announced by his daughter Günfer Günaydın in her Twitter feed. He was laid to rest at the Feriköy Cemetery, Istanbul.
