= Ahmet Mete Işıkara =

Turkish geophysicist (1941–2013)

- Born: 22 October 1941; Mersin, Turkey
- Died: 21 January 2013 (aged 71); Istanbul, Turkey
- Resting place: Feriköy Cemetery, Istanbul
- Education: Istanbul University; Imperial College London; University of Göttingen
- Known for: Efforts to create public awareness of the need for protection and safety during earthquakes
- Scientific career
- Fields: Seismology, geomagnetism
- Workplaces: Boğaziçi University

Ahmet Mete Işıkara (22 October 1941 – 21 January 2013) was a Turkish geophysicist and earthquake scientist known for his efforts to create public awareness of the need for earthquake-related protection and safety.

== Early years ==
Işıkara was born 1941 in Mersin. In 1947 he went to primary school and in 1954 to junior high school in Mersin. After finishing high school in Mersin, he studied in Istanbul University graduating in 1965. In the same year, he began his academic career as an geophysics assistant at the Faculty of Science. He continued his studies in Imperial College London and University of Göttingen.

Işıkara married Aysel Ahıska, the daughter of singer Necmi Rıza Ahıska, in 1969. From this marriage were born a son, Cengiz, and a daughter, Yeşim.

== Career ==
Up to 1976, Işıkara studied terrestrial magnetism. Between 1976 and 1983 he served as the chairman of the Turkish National Geodesy and Geophysics Association and he served on the Aeronomy Commission between 1976 and 1983.

From 1979 to 1982, he was the coordinator of the European Workgroup for Earthquake Prediction, and in the years 1980–1983 he represented Turkey in the Earthquake Specialists Committee of the Council of Europe.

In 1985, he joined Boğaziçi University and was appointed assistant director of Earthquake Research Center of Kandilli Observatory. In 1991 he became director of the observatory, and he served at this post until 2002.

Following the 1999 İzmit earthquake, he repeatedly addressed people on television to create awareness for protection and safety during earthquakes. In this period, he earned the nickname Deprem Dede (English: Grandpa Earthquake). His quote "Quakes don’t kill, buildings do." became famous.

In 2003, Işıkara was appointed chairman of the newly established Disaster Preparedness and Earthquake Education Association (Turkish: Afete Hazırlık ve Deprem Eğitimi Derneği (AHDER)). Işıkara served as the head consultant of the Turkish Red Crescent.

== Politics ==
Işıkara tried to enter politics in the 2002 general elections, running for a seat in the parliament via the True Path Party (DYP). In Turkey's electoral system, parties that receive less than 10% of all votes are not qualified to gain seats in the parliament. In the 2002 elections, DYP received slightly less than 10% and so Işıkara was not able to enter parliament.

== Death ==
Işıkara died on 21 January 2013 due to respiratory insufficiency in a hospital in Istanbul, where he had been treated for 44 days in the intensive care unit. He was laid to rest at the Feriköy Cemetery, Istanbul.

== Legacy ==
A primary school in Mersin is named after Işıkara.
