= Feriköy Protestant Cemetery =

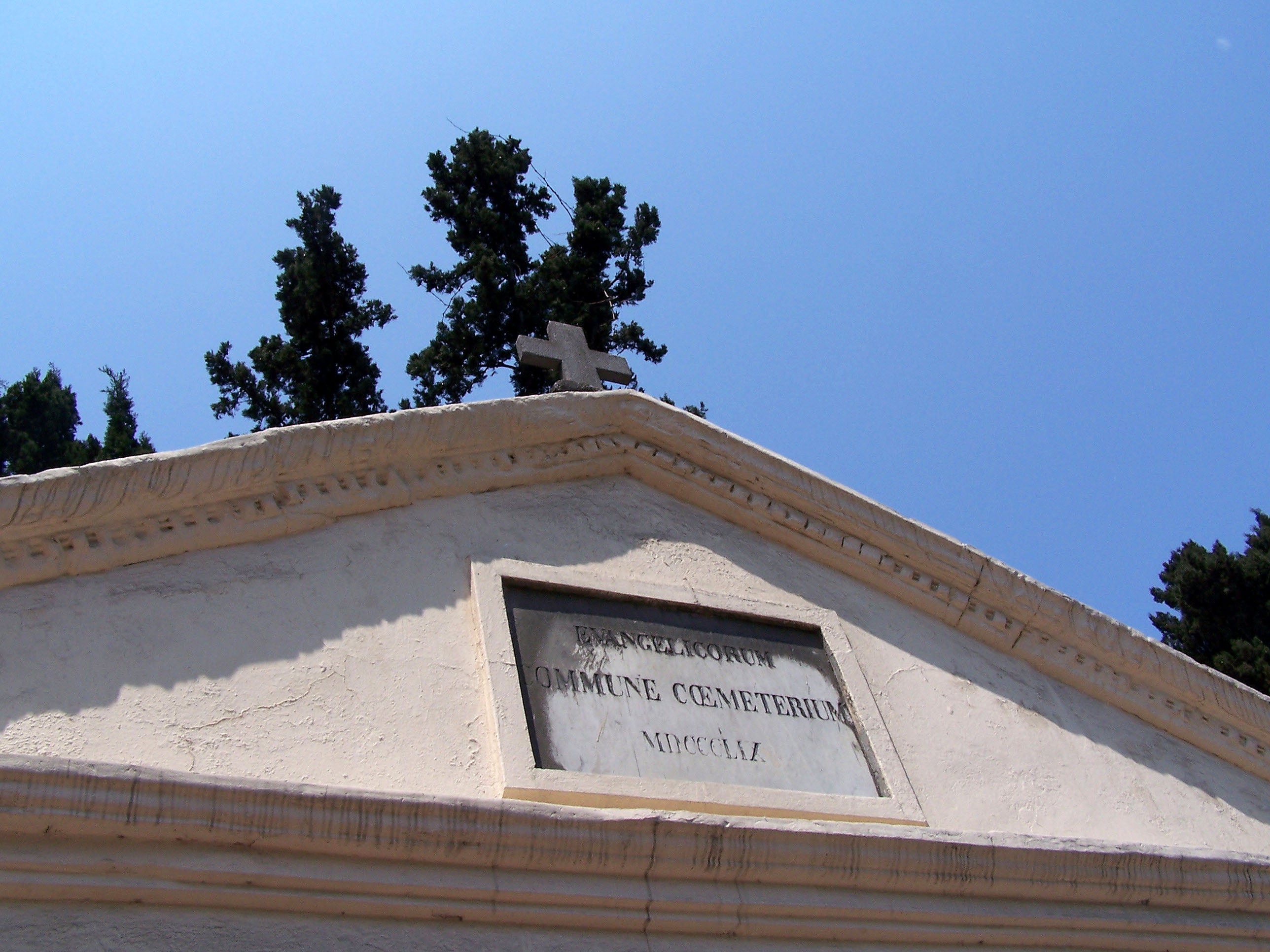
- Main gate of the Feriköy Protestant Cemetery
- Interactive map of Feriköy Protestant Cemetery

Details
- Established: 1859
- Location: Feriköy, Şişli, Istanbul
- Country: Turkey
- Coordinates: 41°03′14″N 28°59′02″E Feriköy Protestant Cemetery (Istanbul)
- Type: Protestant Cemetery
- Style: Nineteenth- and twentieth-century European

The Feriköy Protestant Cemetery (Turkish: Feriköy Protestan Mezarlığı), officially called Evangelicorum Commune Coemeterium, is an international Christian cemetery in Istanbul, Turkey. As its name indicates, it is the final resting place for Protestants in Istanbul. The cemetery is in the Feriköy neighborhood of Istanbul's Şişli district, roughly 3 km (1.9 mi) north of Taksim Square. It is an official member of the Association of Significant Cemeteries in Europe (ASCE).

The cemetery is managed by a governing board composed of the consulates general of Germany, the United Kingdom, the United States, the Netherlands, Sweden, Hungary and Switzerland, which exchange the presidency on an annual basis. In 2018, the Feriköy Protestant Cemetery Initiative formed to help preserve the cemetery as a burial place, historic landmark, and urban green spot, and in 2021 it was recognized by the governing board as its official partner in caring for the site.

In 1857, by order of Sultan Abdülmecid I, the Ottoman government gifted the land for the cemetery to the leading Protestant powers of the time: the United Kingdom, Prussia, the United States, the Netherlands, Sweden, Norway, Denmark and the Federated Cities of the Hanseatic League together with the Grand Duchy of Oldenburg. Since then, about 5,000 individuals have been interred here. Members of the Reformed Churches, as well as Lutherans and Anglicans, rest in the cemetery. Yet, while most of those buried here identified in life as Protestants, others of different faiths and backgrounds are also interred in the cemetery.

The cemetery contains examples of many different styles of memorial from the seventeenth century to the present. The stones propped up along the east and south walls are some of the last links to Istanbul's former burial ground for Europeans and other Westerners – known as the "Graveyard of the Franks" – in the Grand Champs des Morts, Pera's "Great Field of the Dead," which was lost to urban development during the nineteenth century. The memorials on the east wall, in the so-called "Monument Row," are the most impressive.

== History ==
Between 1840 and 1910, the area of Istanbul stretching northward from Taksim to Şişli was transformed from open countryside to densely inhabited residential settlement. Early nineteenth-century maps of Istanbul show much of the area in this direction taken up by the non-Muslim burial grounds of the Grand Champs des Morts, with the Frankish section directly in the path of the main route of expansion. The urban development in the Ottoman capital, influenced by Western models, led to the closure of the Grand Champs des Morts, a world-renowned necropolis, which had provided inspiration, as well as an ideal, for the cemetery reformers of Europe.

Already by 1842, the Graveyard of the Franks was being whittled down, as a contemporary account by Reverend William Goodell attests. A member of American Board of Commissioners for Foreign Missions, who worked among the Armenians in Istanbul, Goodell had lost his nine-year-old son, Constantine Washington, to typhoid fever in 1841 and buried him in the Frankish cemetery. In his memoirs, for the date 18 February 1842, he noted:

On account of the encroachments on the Frank burying ground, I had to remove the body of our beloved boy. The grave had been dug deep, and the coffin was scarcely damp. Every thing was sweet and still. The new grave which we have prepared a few rods distant was also deep and dry; and there we laid the body, to rest in its quiet bed till the resurrection morning. Beloved child, farewell!

However, little Constantine's tranquility lasted far less than expected, disturbed again by a flurry of construction in the early 1860s. In July 1863, the remains of more than a dozen Americans, including those of Constantine Washington Goodell, were exhumed from the Graveyard of the Franks. They were transferred, along with their grave markers, to the new Protestant cemetery in Feriköy, which had opened in 1859. The land occupied by the former Frankish cemetery was turned into a public park (in a modern Western sense), a project finally completed with the opening of Taksim Garden in 1869.

The first burial in the Feriköy Protestant Cemetery occurred in November 1858, but the cemetery did not open officially until early in 1859. Although the cemetery was created primarily for foreign nationals, a separate section in the southwest corner is reserved for Armenian Protestants.

There is one Commonwealth war grave, of an officer of the British Army Intelligence Corps, who died during World War II, in 1945.

== The Armenian Protestant section ==
The space reserved for Armenian Protestants is separated by a wall from the main cemetery where foreign Protestants are laid to rest, since Armenians were regarded as "Ottoman subjects." In this small section, there are also grave markers commemorating Greeks, Arabs, Assyrians, and Turkish Protestants (including former Muslims that converted to Protestantism) with epitaphs in several different languages.

== Selected notable burials ==
A few noteworthy individuals buried in the cemetery are:

- Betty Carp (1895–1974), American embassy official and intelligence agent.
- Norman Stone (1941–2019), British historian and author.
- Traugott Fuchs (1906–1997), German scholar and artist.
- Ernest Mamboury (1878–1953), Swiss scholar renowned for his works on Byzantine art and architecture in Istanbul, as well as his guidebook to the city, Constantinople: Guide Touristique (English edition, Constantinople: Tourists’ Guide).
- Hilary Sumner-Boyd (d. 1976) and John Freely (1926–2017), American co-authors of Strolling through Istanbul, a seminal guidebook to the city,.
- Max Fruchtermann (1852–1918), German (born in Austro-Hungary) postcard publisher.
- Josephine Powell (1919–2007), American photographer, traveler, and collector of carpets and kilims.
- Franz Carl Bomonti (1857–1903), Swiss brewer, who contributed to the beginning of Turkey's modern beer industry.
- Elias Riggs (1810–1901), American missionary and linguist.
- Per Wilhelm (Guillaume) Berggren (1835–1920), Swedish photographer.
- Paul Lange (1857–1919), Prussian, last musician of the Ottoman court and an important orchestra and choir conductor in Istanbul in the years 1880–1919.
- William Nosworthy Churchill (1796–1846), British journalist who became editor of the Ceride-i Havadis newspaper in the Ottoman Empire.

== Gallery ==
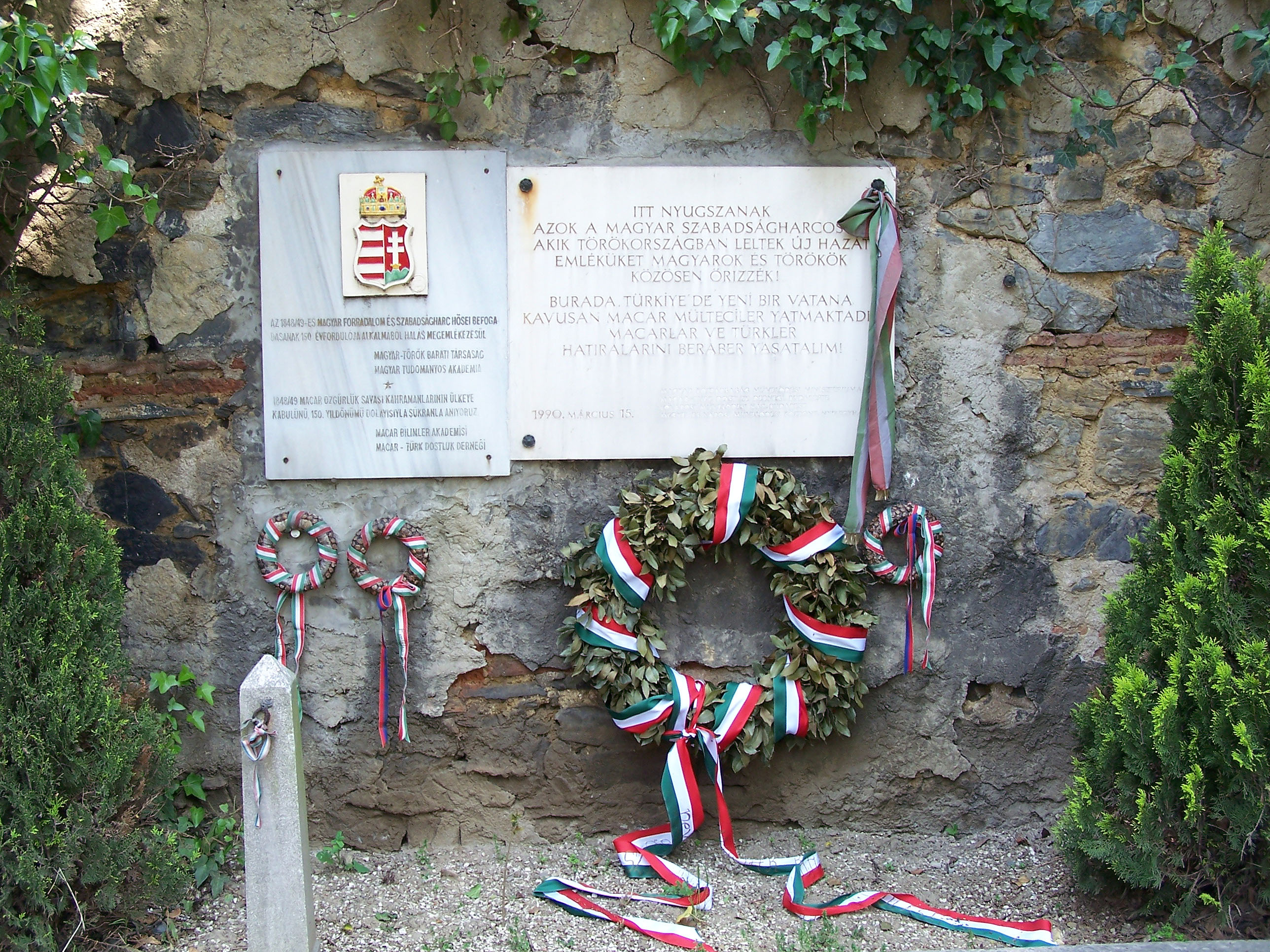
Memorial to Hungarian freedom fighters of 1848–1849 at the Protestant Cemetery in Istanbul

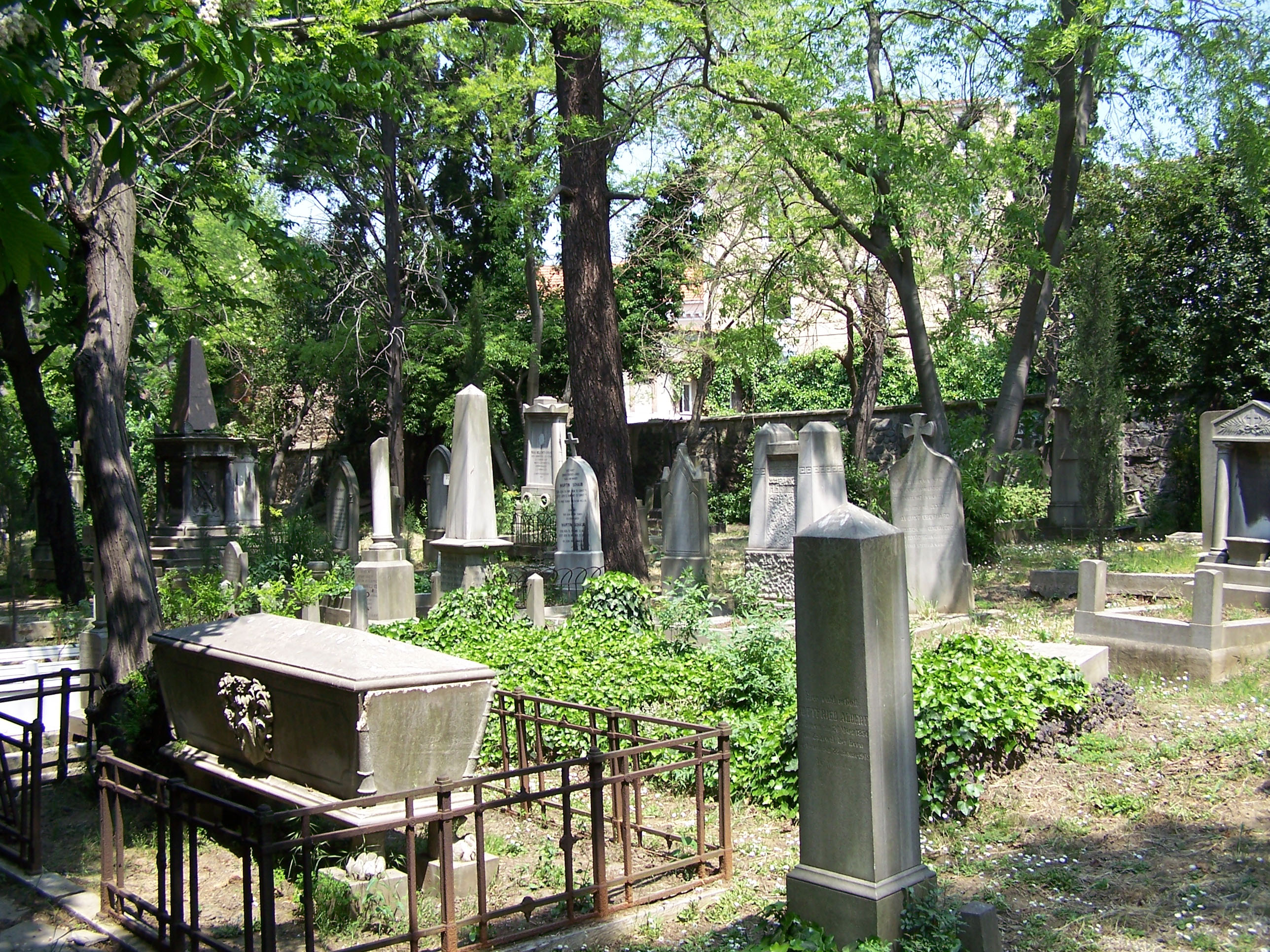
Tombstones in the Feriköy Protestant Cemetery

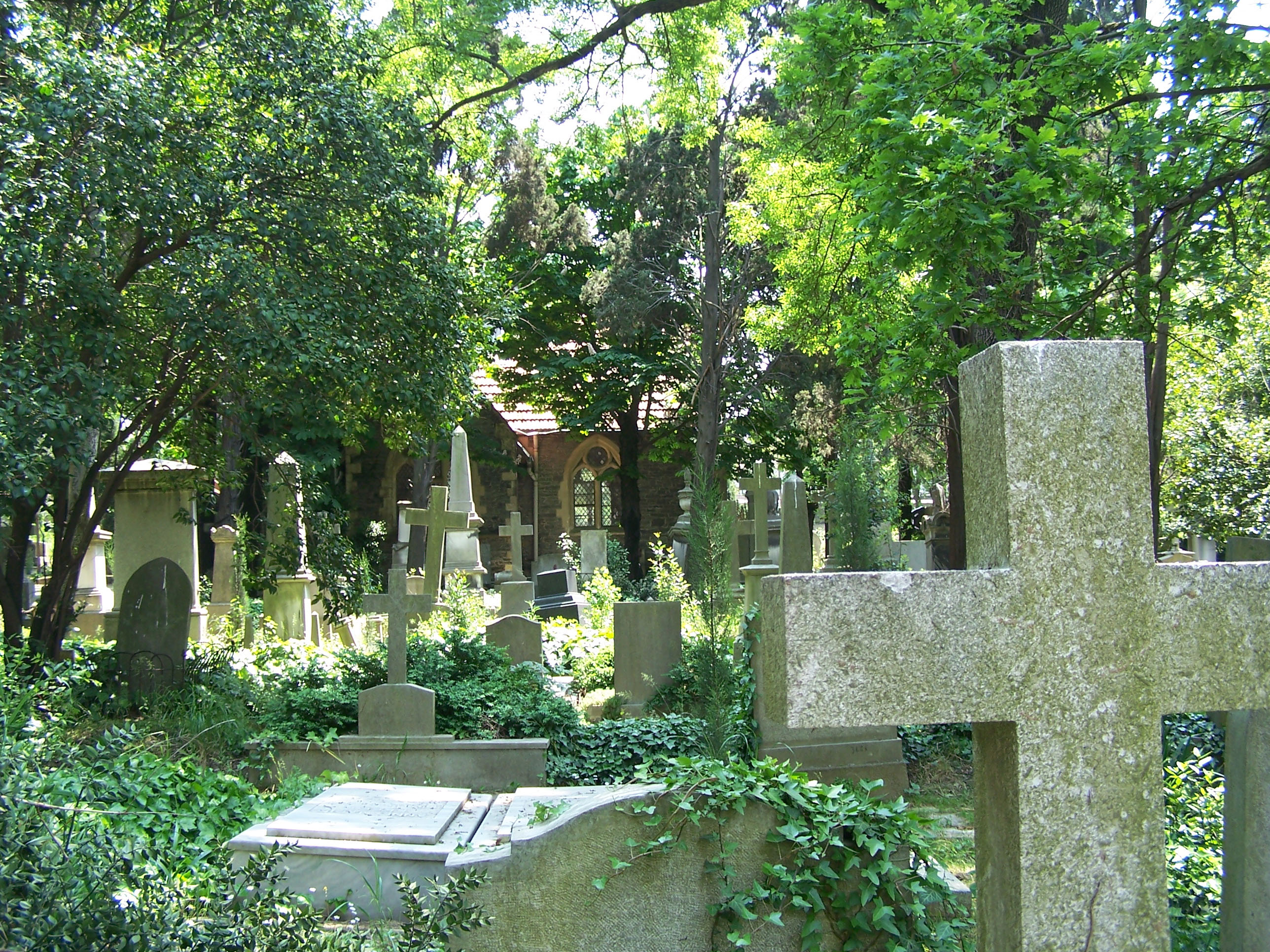
Tombstones in the Feriköy Protestant Cemetery, with the chapel in the background

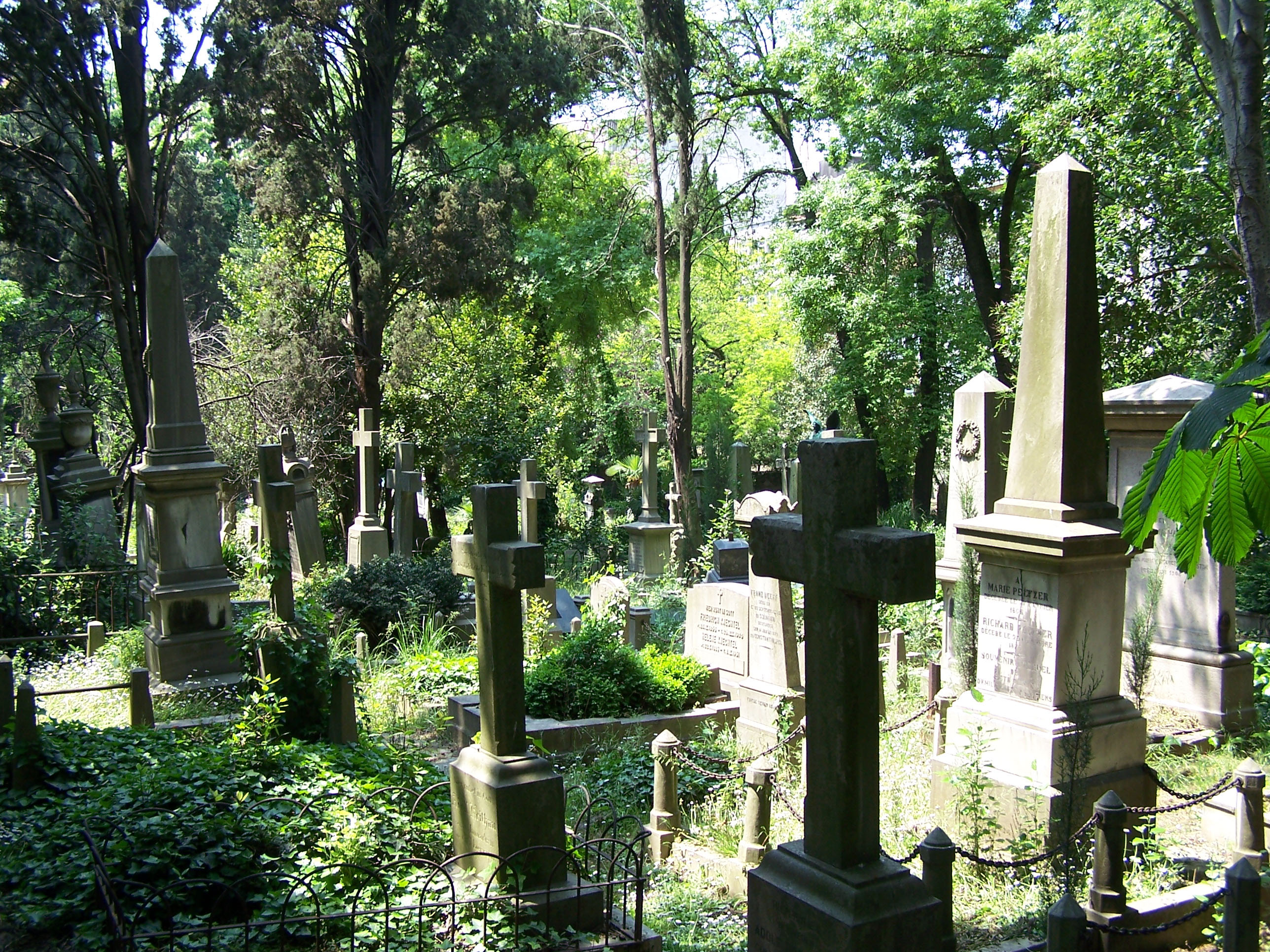
Tombstones in the Feriköy Protestant Cemetery

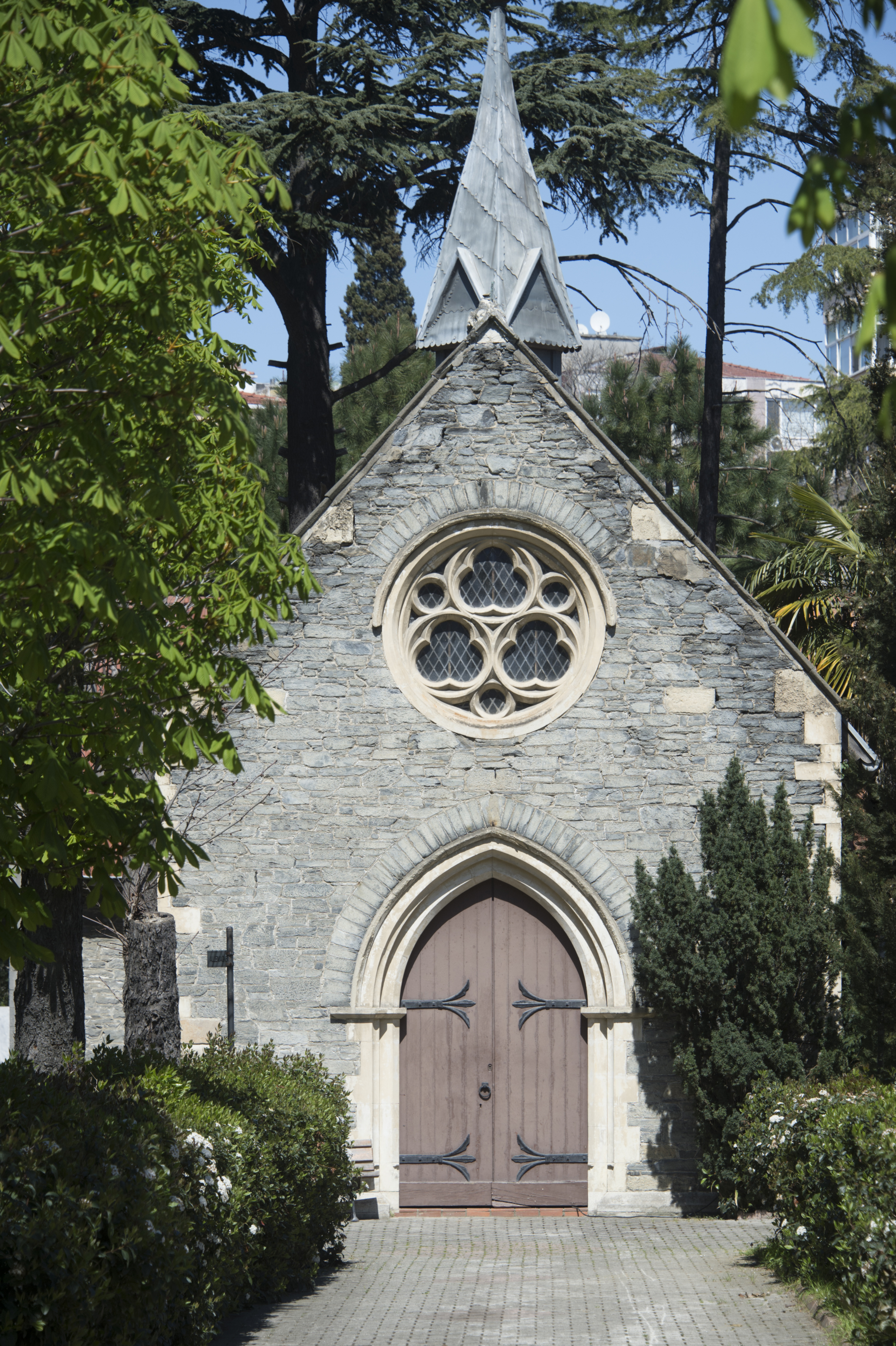
The Feriköy Protestant Cemetery's chapel

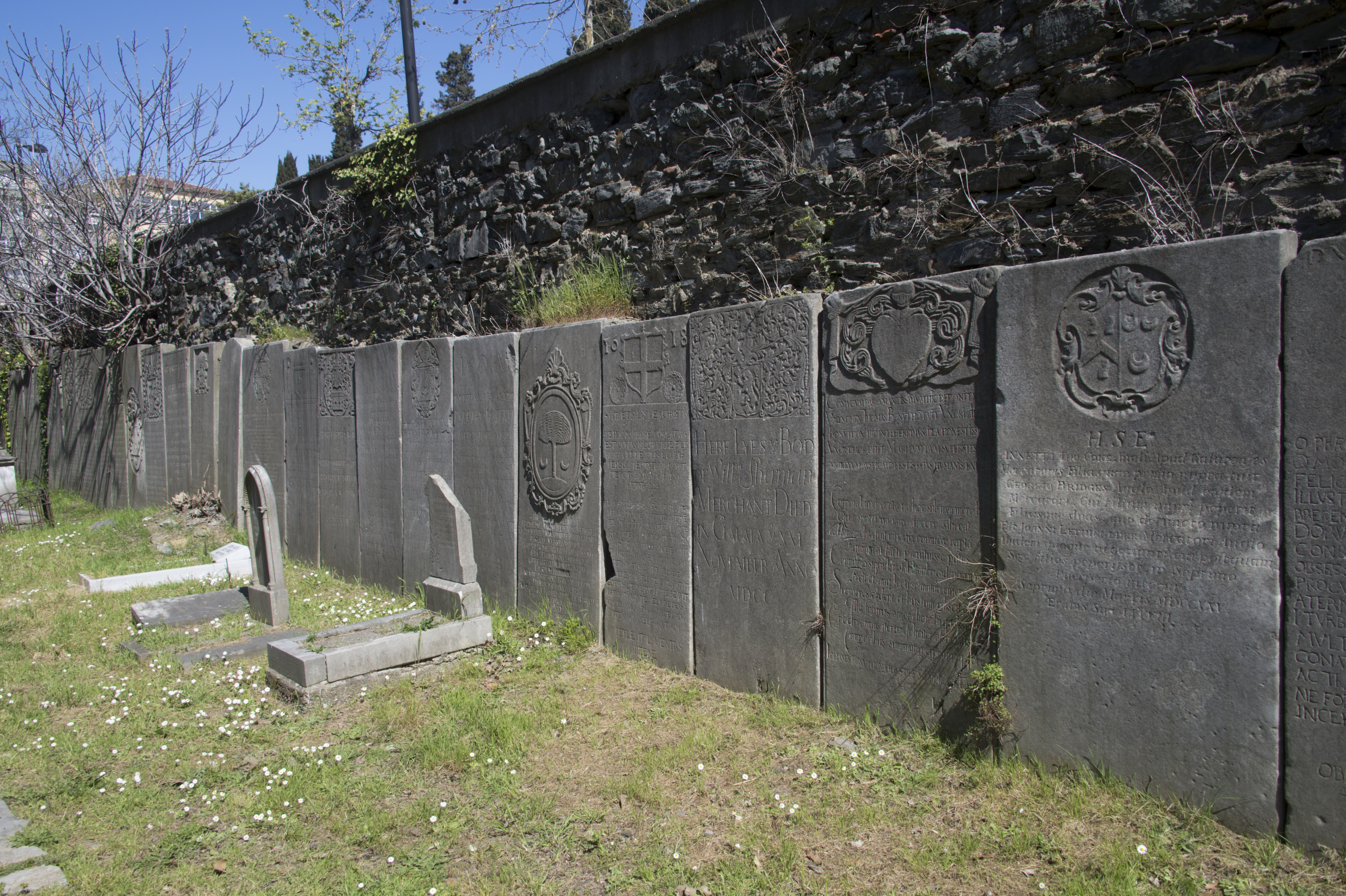
Old gravestones in Monument Row, on the east wall of the Feriköy Protestant Cemetery

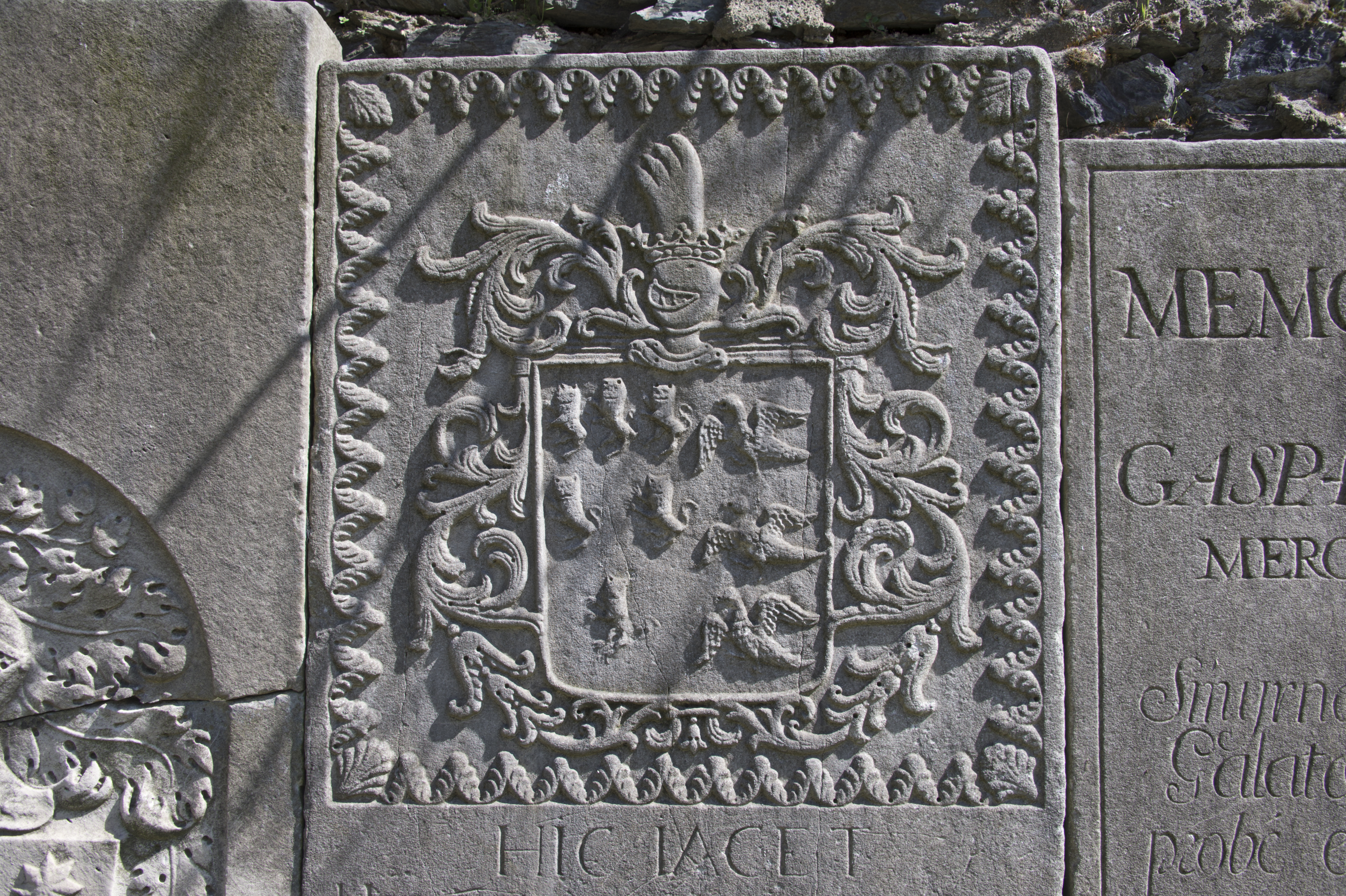
Coat of arms on a stone in Monument Row

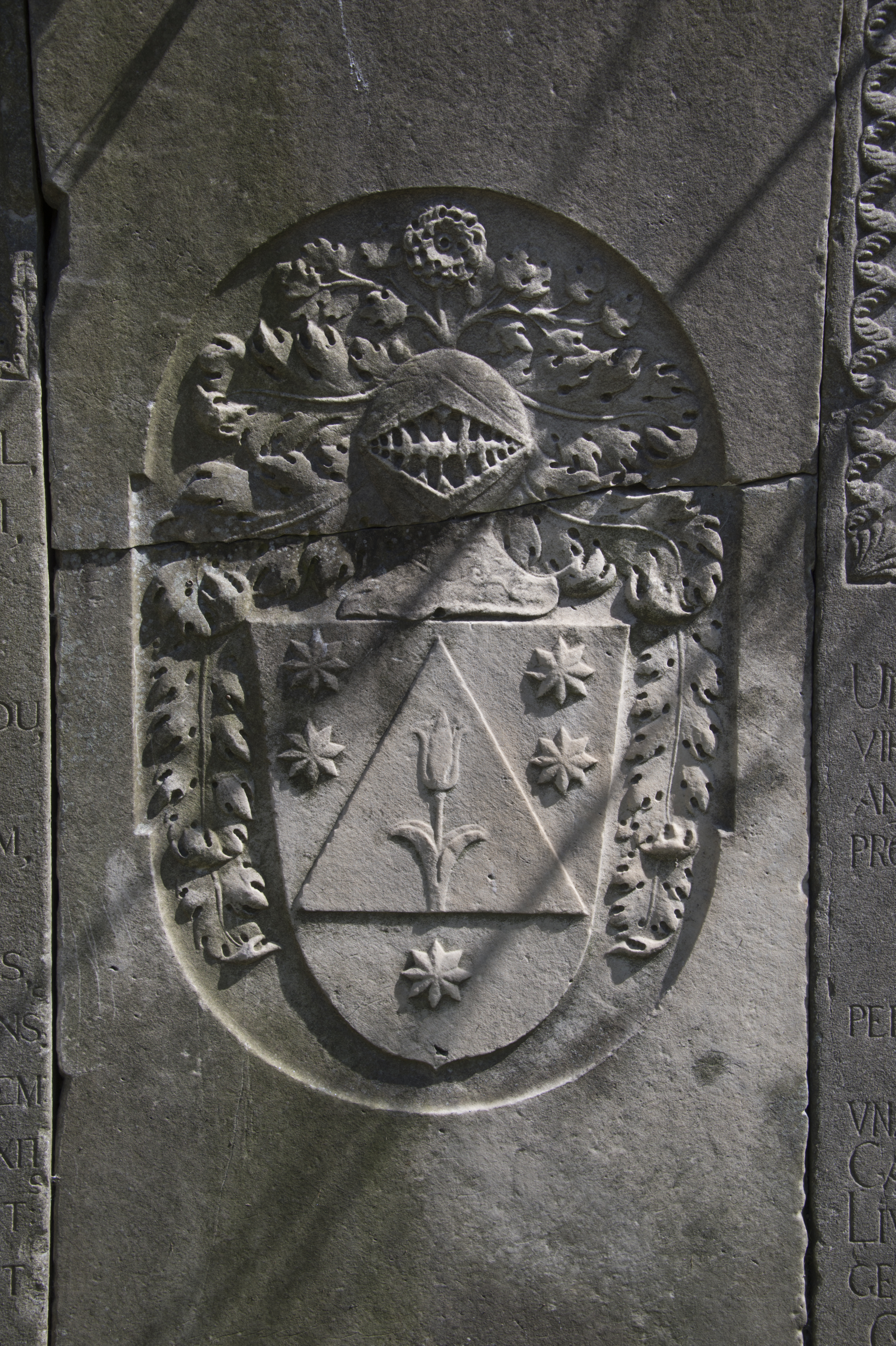
Coat of arms on a stone in Monument Row

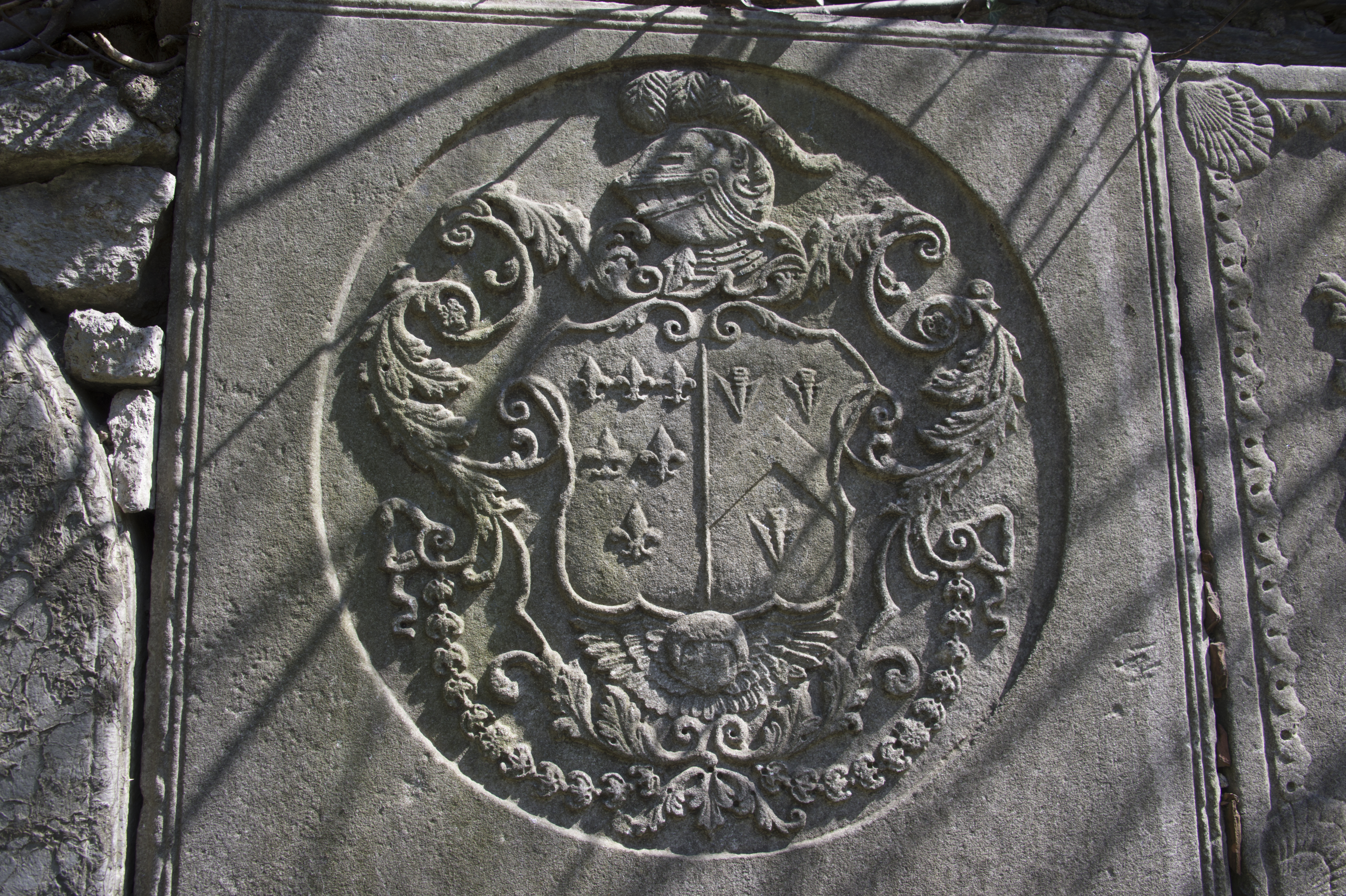
Coat of arms on a stone in Monument Row

== See also ==
- Pangaltı Catholic Cemetery, Istanbul

== External links and references ==
- Website of the Feriköy Protestant Cemetery Initiative
- Bulletin of the Feriköy Protestant Cemetery Initiative
- Feriköy Protestant Cemetery Visitor Guide
- ASCE webpage for the Feriköy Protestant Cemetery
- Views of the Feriköy Protestant Cemetery
- 50 Pictures of the Cemetery
- Istanbul's Christian and Jewish Cemeteries from 1453 Until Today | History of Istanbul
- Feriköy Neighborhood Profile, İstanΠόλις
