= Ayseli Göksoy =

Turkish politician

Hatice Ayseli Göksoy

Member of the 20th Parliament for Manisa
- In office 8 January 1996 – 25 March 1999

Personal details
- Born: Hatice Ayseli Erman; 21 September 1935 Istanbul, Turkey
- Died: 26 November 2022 (aged 87)
- Resting place: Feriköy Cemetery
- Party: True Path Party DYP
- Other political affiliations: Democrat Turkey Party DTP
- Children: 2
- Occupation: Painter, women's rights activist, politician

Hatice Ayseli Göksoy (née Erman, 21 September 1935 – 26 November 2022), was a Turkish painter, women's rights activist and politician. She served one term in the parliament.

== Women's rights activist ==
Göksoy was active in a number of women's organizations. In 1964, she was elected to the central board of the Turkish Women Union. She became chairperson of that organization in 1983. She gave great importance to women's rights. She organized celebrations of the International Women's Day on 8 March and the Day of the Turkish women's passive suffrage on 5 December (1934). She initiated the establishment of special schools by the Ministry of National Education for the mentally disabled children.

== Politician career ==
Göksoy joined the True Path Party (Turkish: Doğru Yol Partisi, DYP). She ran for the Deputy of Manisa in the 1995 general election. She entered the Grand National Assembly of Turkey to serve in the 20th Parliament.

In 1997, she resigned from the DYP, and co-founded the Democrat Turkey Party. She was elected to the deputy chairperson.

== Personal life ==
Hatice Ayseli Göksoy was born to Ali Rıza Erman and Emine Erman in Istanbul, Turkey on 21 September 1935. She had one sister, Nihal, and two brothers, Nihat and Atilla.

She was schooled in the Nişantaşı 52nd Primary School. After completing her secondary and high school education at Nişantaşı High School for Girls, she attended Zübeyde Hanım Technical School for Girls. Then, she took private lessons in painting. She exhibited her works several times.

Göksoy married to Abdülkadir Durmuş Göksoy, and gave birth to two daughters, Banu Nerime (Köksal) and Bengü Çiğdem (Baydar).

Hatice Ayseli Gürsoy died in Istanbul on 26 November 2022. She was buried at Feriköy Cemetery following a religious service at Teşvikiye Mosque.
