= Betty Carp =

American embassy official (1895–1974)

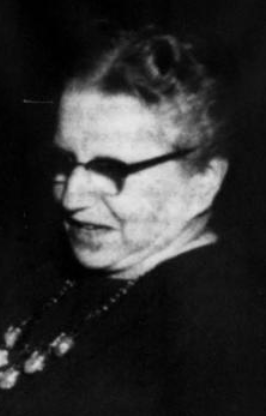
- Betty Carp, from a 1964 publication of the US Department of State
- Born: Bertha Carp; June 15, 1895; Constantinople, Turkey
- Died: June 12, 1974 (aged 78); Istanbul, Turkey
- Occupations: Embassy official, OSS agent

Bertha "Betty" Carp (June 15, 1895 – June 12, 1974) was an American embassy official and intelligence agent, called "The Best Known American in Turkey".

== Early life ==
Carp was born in Constantinople, the daughter of German or Austrian parents. She was educated at schools in Turkey, London, and Vienna.

== Career ==
Carp worked at the American embassies in Istanbul and Ankara for most of her life. She was hired by ambassador Henry Morgenthau in 1914 as a messenger, typist and telephone operator. She became an interpreter, attaché, consul, and political officer. She received the State Department's Superior Honor Award at her retirement in 1964 from Secretary of State Dean Rusk, who called her a "living legend" and noted that she "is to be commended for her sociological reports, especially on religious, minority, educational, and legal matters". She was "confidant to two dozen ambassadors and their wives" and "knew all the policemen and the shopkeepers and the crippled children of Beyoglu."

During World War II and after, from 1942 to 1947, Carp worked for the Office of Strategic Services (OSS) in New York, where she compiled biographical profiles of Balkan leaders using her language skills and wide network of diplomatic contacts. She was a longtime, close colleague to CIA director Allen Dulles. She was also active in fundraising for the American Hospital in Istanbul.

== Personal life ==
Carp stood under 5 feet in height, and her physique and demeanor were described as "matronly"; she used her nonthreatening appearance to advantage when making contacts and gathering intelligence. She became a United States citizen in 1947. Her apartment in Istanbul overlooked the Dolmabahce pier, and was an informal gathering place for the American intelligence community. She died in Istanbul in 1974, a few days before her 79th birthday. Her grave is in Feriköy Protestant Cemetery in Istanbul. A biography of Carp based on her correspondence and other sources, The Best Known American in Turkey by Rifat N. Bali, was published in Turkish in 2014.
