= Oya Kayacık =

Turkish nurse (1938–2020)

- Born: 1938; Beyoğlu, Istanbul, Turkey
- Died: December 2, 2020 (aged 81–82); Istanbul, Turkey
- Burial place: Feriköy Cemetery
- Other name: "Oya Anne" ("Mother Oya")
- Education: Arnavutköy American High School for Girls
- Occupation: Orphanage nurse
- Years active: 1960–2020

Oya Kayacık (1938 – December 2, 2020) was a Turkish nurse who spent more than 60 years working with children in an orphanage in Istanbul. She was dubbed Mother Oya.

== Early years ==
Kayacık was born the only child of a wealthy merchant family at Beyoğlu district of Istanbul in 1938. She was educated in Arnavutköy American High School for Girls in Istanbul.

After graduation, Kayacık joined the "Kasımpaşa Çocuk Yuvası Koruma Derneği" ("Kasımpaşa Kindergarten Protection Association") at age 21 to take part in a social responsibility project.

== Career ==
In 1960, Kayacık was involved in charity work in the orphanage ("Kasımpaşa Çocuk Yuvası", later "Kasımpaşa Çocuk Evleri Sitesi") in Kasımpaşa quarter of Beyoğlu, run by the Ministry of Family, Labour and Social Services. She started working as a volunteer pushing away the opportunities offered by her family.

Kayacık explained how she decided to work in the orphanage: "The first day in the orphanage, I met a 3.5-year old sick boy in the orphanage. He was in treatment at Cerrahpaşa Hospital. I cared for his recovery, and he behaved warmly to me. The pleasure of having helped him kept me to stay in the orphanage."

The orphanage was housed in a small building, and was financed through the revenues of a dispensary situated in the building. In addition to the boarders living on the premises, there were also day children. In the beginning, Kayacık went to the orphanage daily from her home. She improved conditions in the institution by collecting stoves from the nearby coffeehouses to keep the children warm. She brought food cooked at her home to the children. Finally, she left her home and moved into a small room in the orphanage in order not to leave the orphans alone. She thus became best described as a mother. The orphans and the people living in Kasımpaşa called her "Oya Anne" ("Mother Oya").

Kayacık was the legal guardian of two girls, Nursel Ergin, and Göksenin. Nursel Ergin became known in the television game show 'Var mısın? Yok musun? (Turkish version of Deal or No Deal) and presents the television cookery show Nursel'in Mutfağı ("Nursel's Cuisine"). In 2008, during her appearance on the game show, Ergin started a donation campaign totaling ₺ 2.5 million (approx. US$1.67 million in 2008) for the completion of the construction of a new orphanage building to replace the old one, which was damaged during the 1999 İzmit earthquake. Göksenin was born with Down syndrome. In 2018, President Erdoğan, who was born and grew up in Kasımpaşa, honored Kayacık by paying a visit to the orphanage and meeting her personally.

Kayacık worked in the orphanage for more than 60 years without being on salary.

== Death and legacy ==
In November 2020, Kayacık was diagnosed with COVID-19, which she recovered from with the determination to live. After a short time, she was hospitalized due to low blood pressure. Kayacık died in the Koşuyolu Hospital from cardiovascular disease at age 82 on December 2, 2020. She was interred at the Feriköy Cemetery next to her parents' graves following a memorial ceremony held in front of the Kasımpaşa Orphanage, and a religious funeral service at Hacı Ayşe Sarıgül Mosque. She was not married.

Upon a directive of Zehra Zümrüt Selçuk, the Minister of Family, Labour and Social Services, who attended the funeral, the orphanage was officially renamed to "Kasımpaşa Oya Anne Çocuk Yuvası" ("Kasımpaşa Mother Oya Kindergarten").
