= Feridun Buğeker =

Turkish footballer (1933–2014)

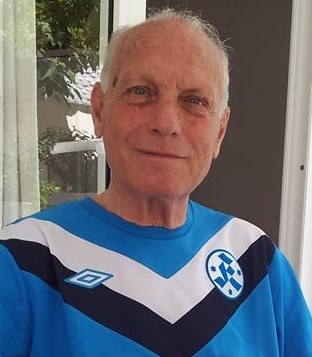
- Feridun Buğeker in 2012

Personal information
- Full name: Feridun İsmail Buğeker
- Date of birth: 5 April 1933
- Place of birth: Istanbul, Turkey
- Date of death: 6 October 2014 (aged 81)
- Place of death: Buried in Feriköy Cemetery, Istanbul
- Position: Forward

Senior career*
Years	Team	Apps	(Gls)
1949–1952	Beyoğluspor		
1952–1955	Fenerbahçe S.K.	42	(15)
1955–1961	Stuttgarter Kickers	22	(4)
1961–1963	Fenerbahçe S.K.	70	(31)

International career
1953	Turkey A2	1	(0)
1953–1955	Turkey	6	(0)
- * Club domestic league appearances and goals

Feridun İsmail Buğeker (5 April 1933 – 6 October 2014) was a Turkish football forward who played for Turkey in the 1954 FIFA World Cup. He also played for Fenerbahçe S.K. between 1950–55 and 1961–63.

He died on 6 October 2014, and was buried at the Feriköy Cemetery, Istanbul.
