= John Freely =

American physicist, teacher, and author (1926–2017)

- Born: 26 June 1926; Brooklyn, New York, U.S.
- Died: 20 April 2017 (aged 90)
- Resting place: Feriköy Protestant Cemetery, Istanbul
- Education: Iona College (BS); New York University (PhD)
- Partner: Dolores "Toots" Stanley
- Children: Maureen, Eileen, Brendan
- Scientific career
- Fields: Physics, history of science
- Workplaces: Oxford University; Robert College; Boğaziçi University

John Freely (26 June 1926 – 20 April 2017) was an American physicist, teacher, and author of books on the history of science and travel.

He was the father of writer and Turko-English literary translator Maureen Freely.

== Life ==
Freely was born in Brooklyn, New York, and grew up there and in Ireland. He dropped out of high school and joined the U.S. Navy at the age of 17 for the last two years of World War II, serving with a commando unit in Burma and China. He did his undergraduate work at the traditional American Catholic college, Iona College in New Rochelle, New York, under the G.I. Bill.

In 1947, Freely married Dolores "Toots" Stanley after they had agreed to devote their lives to travel. He died in the UK in 2015 and his remains were interred in Feriköy Protestant Cemetery in Istanbul.

=== Academic career ===
Freely received his PhD in physics at New York University, and later pursued his postdoctoral studies in the history of science at Oxford University under Alistair Cameron Crombie. The principal idea he inherited from Crombie was "the continuity of western European science from the Dark Ages through Copernicus, Galileo and Newton". Following his postdoctoral work, he went in 1960 to Istanbul, Turkey, and took up a post at Robert College (later Boğaziçi University). He subsequently taught courses there in physics and the history of science and astronomy, including the course "The Emergence of Modern Science, East and West", with sojourns in New York City, Boston, London, Athens, Oxford, and Venice. He returned to Boğaziçi University in 1993.

=== Writing life ===
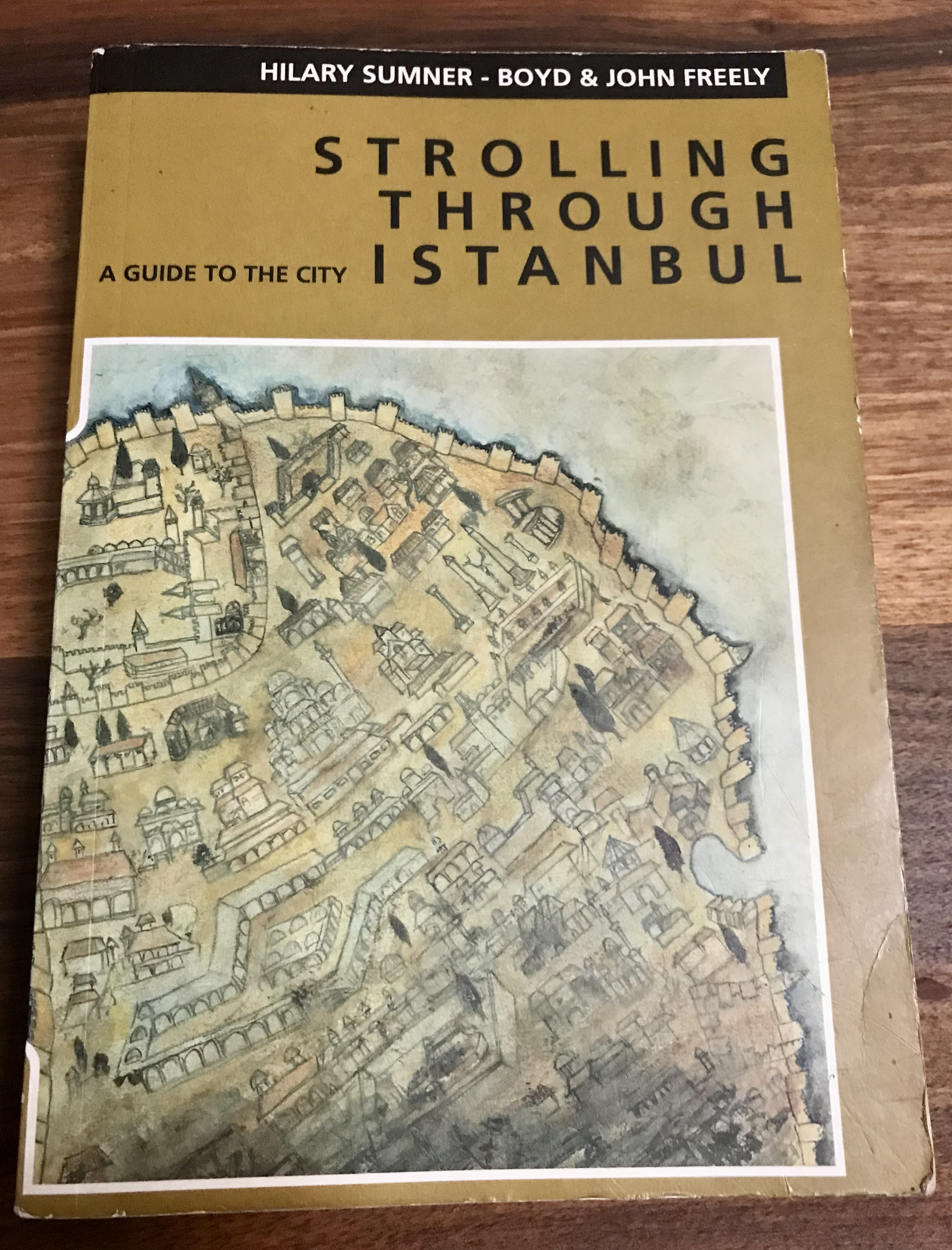
John Freely and Hilary Sumner-Boyd's classic guidebook, Strolling Through Istanbul

Freely was the author of more than 40 books, many of them either histories of Istanbul and Turkey, accounts of the lives of significant figures of the Ottoman Empire or travel guides, especially about Istanbul. Together with Hilary Sumner-Boyd, a colleague from Boğaziçi University, Freely published Strolling Through Istanbul: A Guide to the City in 1972. While sales were initially slow, they picked up as travel to Istanbul increased, and by the early 2000s it was regarded as a classic of the guidebook genre for its blending of the academically rigorous with an accessible, even lively, writing style. It continues in print fifty years after its initial publication.

Among the more unusual topics he wrote about were the lives of Cem Sultan, the third son of Sultan Mehmet II who laid claim to the Ottoman throne but was defeated and ended his life in exile in Europe; and Sabbetai Zevi, the so-called Jewish Messiah from Smyrna (now İzmir), who eventually converted, at least on the surface, to Islam and whose followers became known as the Dönme.

== Works ==
=== Travel guides ===
- Strolling Through Istanbul: A Guide to the City (1972; 9th edition 2006), with Hilary Sumner-Boyd; (2009) Tauris Parke Paperbacks
- Complete Guide to Greece (1974), with Maureen Freely, Littlehampton Book Services Ltd
- Naxos: Ariadne's Isle (1976; 2nd edition, 1980), Lycabettus Press
- Blue Guide Istanbul (1983; 2nd edition, 1987; 3rd, 1991; 4th, 1997; 5th, 2000)
- Blue Guide Boston and Cambridge (1984; 2nd edition, 1994), A & C Black Publishers Ltd
- The Companion Guide to Turkey (1984; 2nd edition, 1996), Boydell Press
- Crete (1988), Weidenfeld & Nicolson; new edition (1989) New Amsterdam Books
- The Western Shores of Turkey: Discovering the Aegean and Mediterranean Coasts (1988), John Murray Pub Ltd; 2nd edition (2004), Tauris Parke Paperbacks
- Classical Turkey (1990; Series: Architectural Guides for Travellers), Viking
- Strolling Through Athens: Fourteen Unforgettable Walks through Europe's Oldest City (1991), Penguin; 2nd edition (2004), Tauris Parke Paperbacks
- Strolling through Venice: The Definitive Walking Guidebook to "La Serenissima" (1994, 2nd edition, 2008), Tauris Parke Paperbacks
- The Redhouse Guide to the Black Sea Coast of Turkey (1996); photographs by Anthony E. Baker, Redhouse Press
- The Redhouse Guide to the Aegean Coast of Turkey (1996), Redhouse Press
- Crete: Discovering the "Great Island" (1998); Weidenfeld & Nicolson; 2nd edition (2008), Tauris Parke Paperbacks
- The Eastern Mediterranean Coast of Turkey (1999), Milet Publishing Ltd
- The Redhouse Guide to Western Interior of Turkey (1999), Cadogan Guides
- The Bosphorus (1999), Milet Publishing Ltd
- Turkey Around The Marmara (1999), Cadogan Guides
- The Companion Guide to Istanbul and around the Marmara (2000), Companion Guides
- Galata: A Guide to Istanbul's Old Genoese Quarter Archaeology & Art Pubs (2000)
- The Greek Islands (2003), John Murray Pub Ltd
- The Companion Guide to Southern Turkey (2003), Companion Guides
- The Princes' Isles: A Guide (2005), Islander Editions/Adali Yayinlari
- The Cyclades: Discovering the Greek Islands of the Aegean (2006), I B Tauris & Co Ltd
- The Ionian Islands: Corfu, Cephalonia and Beyond (2008), I B Tauris & Co Ltd
- Istanbul: City of Two Continents (2008), with John Cleave, Didier Millet

=== History and science books ===
- Stamboul Sketches (1974; reprinted by Eland in 2014)
- Istanbul: The Imperial City (1996)
- A History of Robert College: The American College for Girls and Boğaziçi University (2000), YKY, two volumes
- Sinan: Architect of Suleyman the Magnificent and the Ottoman Golden Age (1992), with Augusto Romano Burelli; photographs by Ara Güler. Thames & Hudson ISBN 0-500-34120-6. (About 16th-century Ottoman chief architect and civil engineer Mimar Sinan)
- Inside the Seraglio: Private Lives of the Sultans in Istanbul (1999)
- The Lost Messiah: In Search of the Mystical Rabbi Sabbatai Zevi (2001)
- Jem Sultan: The Adventures of a Captive Turkish Prince in Renaissance Europe (2004); HarperCollins
- The Emergence of Modern Science, East and West (2004), Istanbul: Boğaziçi University
- Byzantine Monuments of Istanbul (2004), with Ahmet S. Çakmak; Cambridge University Press
- John Freely's Istanbul (2003, ill. edition 2006), Scala Publishers
- Storm on Horseback: The Seljuk Warriors of Turkey (2008); I B Tauris & Co Ltd
- Children of Achilles: The Greeks in Asia Minor Since the Days of Troy (2009); I B Tauris & Co Ltd
- The Grand Turk: Sultan Mehmet II: Conqueror of Constantinople and Master of an Empire (2009); Tauris Parke Paperbacks
- Aladdin's Lamp: How Greek Science Came to Europe Through the Islamic World (2009)
- Before Galileo: The Birth of Modern Science in Medieval Europe (2012)
- The Flame of Miletus: The Birth of Science in Ancient Greece (and How it Changed the World) (2012); I B Tauris & Co Ltd
- Light from the East: How the Science of Medieval Islam helped to shape the Western World (2010); I B Tauris & Co Ltd
- Celestial Revolutionary: Copernicus, the Man and His Universe (2014); I B Tauris & Co Ltd
- The Art of Exile: A Vagabond Life (2016); I B Tauris & Co Ltd

Forewords

- Runciman, Steven, The Lost Capital of Byzantium: The History of Mistra and the Peloponnese (2009 reprint), Tauris Parke Paperbacks
- Stafford-Deitsch, Jeremy, Kingdoms of Ruin: The Art and Architectural Splendours of Ancient Turkey (2009)
- Bradford, Ernle, The Sultan's Admiral: Barbarossa - Pirate and Empire-Builder (2009), Tauris Parke Paperbacks
