= Guillaume Berggren =

Swedish photographer (1835–1920)

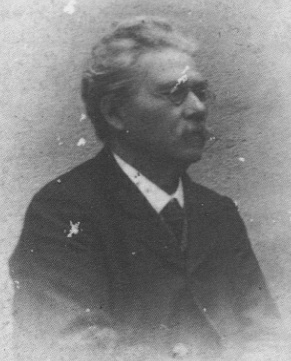
- Berggren c. 1888
- Born: Pehr Vilhelm Berggren; 20 March 1835; Stockholm, Sweden
- Died: 26 August 1920 (aged 85); Istanbul, Turkey
- Occupation: Photographer

Pehr Vilhelm Berggren, known as Guillaume Berggren, (20 March 1835, Stockholm – 26 August 1920, Istanbul) was a Swedish photographer active in Istanbul.

== Biography ==
He was born to a poor family with many children and left home to become apprenticed to a carpenter. Within a few years, he found a position as an assistant to the Master Carpenter, Carl Knut Edberg (?-1896). On his recommendation, Berggren was able to obtain a passport without an expiration date, and began traveling in 1855.

While visiting Berlin, he became acquainted with a female photographer and was given his first lessons in photography. She died shortly after, and he inherited her camera. He then continued his travels, through Dresden, Ljubljana, Bucharest and Odessa, arriving in Istanbul in 1866. Shortly after, he adopted a French first name and set up a photography studio, named "Lilla Sverige" (Little Sweden), at 414 İstiklal Avenue.

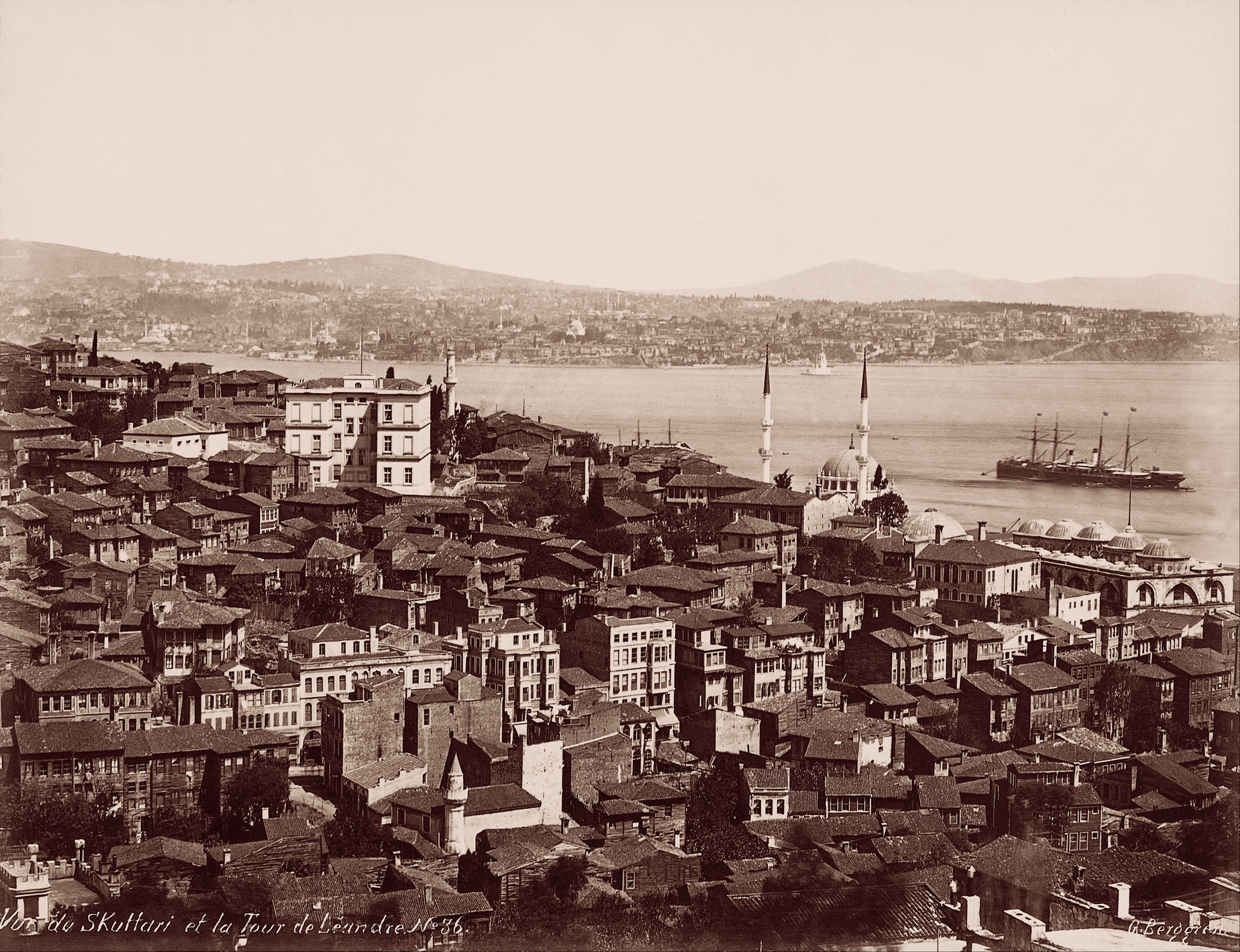
Boğazkesen Castle, Tophane (1880s)

His photographs were mostly everyday scenes, but he also took pictures of events related to the Russo-Turkish War and the opening of the Orient Express. Tourists were a major source of income.

He went back to Sweden in 1883, but soon returned to Istanbul with a young woman whom he introduced as his niece, Hilda Ullin. What was meant to be a visit turned into a lifetime commitment, as she remained to help him operate his studio and set up a shop, which she ran for several years after his death. They also took advantage of the increasing popularity of postcards, producing numerous landscapes and urban scenes. Their shop was well known in Sweden and became a popular spot for Swedish travelers, including several notable people, such as Anders and Emma Zorn, King Oscar II and Sven Hedin.

A visit by the Zorns is described in autobiographical notes by Claes Adolf Adelsköld:

"On Christmas Eve in the morning, Zorn and I decided to play Turks and went for this purpose to a Swedish photographer, Mr. Berggren, established in Constantinople, to photograph us in a group, equipped as natives. The group, arranged by Zorn, included an old spearman to a slave trader (it was me), and Emma Zorn was a slave-woman, on whom two lovers, Zorn and Axel, speculated, and sought to outbid each other."

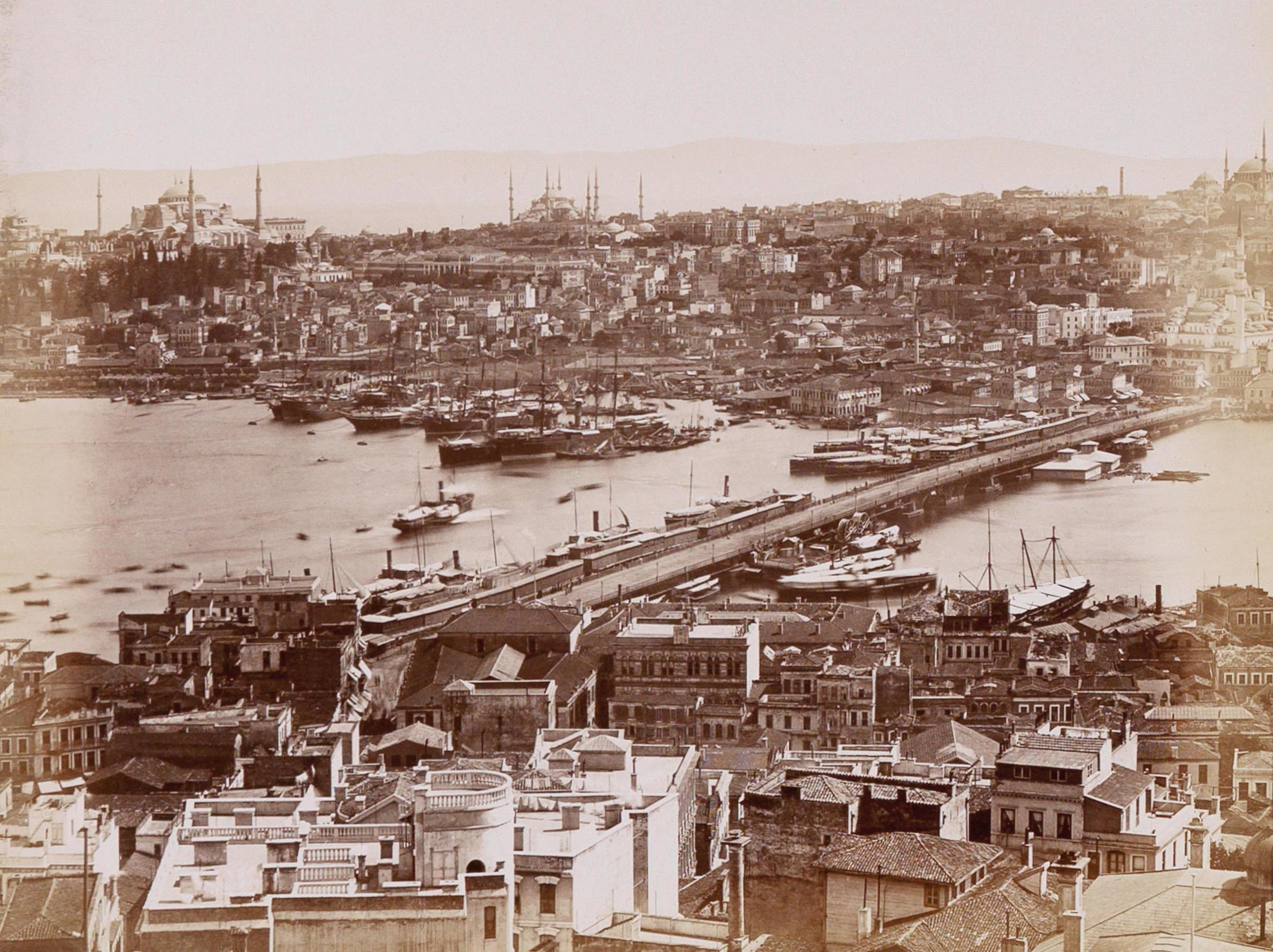
Galata Bridge (1880s)

Eventually, as the price and size of cameras decreased, and tourists were able to buy their own, he found it increasingly difficult to make a living. At one point, he was apparently forced to sell some of his glass negatives to gardeners, who used them to build greenhouses. Luckily, word of this reached officials in the German embassy, who purchased most of his negatives in 1916. They are now preserved at the Deutsches Archäologisches Institut Istanbul. Despite this, Berggren died in poverty.

A large collection of his photographs may be seen at the Moderna museet.
