= Faize Ergin =

Turkish tanbur player and composer

- Born: 1894; Istanbul, Otooman Empire
- Died: February 21, 1954 (aged 59–60) Istanbul, Turkey
- Genres: Ottoman classical music
- Occupation: Composer
- Instruments: Tanbur

Faize Ergin (1894 – 21 February 1954) was a Turkish musician, tanbur player and composer of Ottoman Classical music.

== Early years and career ==
Faize was raised receiving private education. At her very young ages, she was educated in tanbur playing and Ottomsn Classical music by her father's friend Cemil Bey (1873–1916). She expanded her musical repertoire learning quite a lot works from the court musician Hafız Hüsnü Bey and İsmail Hakkı Bey. She taught tanbur playing at "Darülelhan" (nusic school) and various music associations. She started composing with her spouse's encouragement. Her works with lyrics are the most well-known.

== Personal life ==
Faize was born to court chamberlain Faik Bey and Şeminur Hanım in Istanbul, Ottoman Empire in 1894. She had a younger sister, Fahire Fersan. She married education inspector Ruhi Bey.

The artist, who spent her last years in great distress and loneliness, died in Istanbul on 21 February 1954 She was buried at Feriköy Cemetery.
