= Necip Asım Yazıksız =

Turkish historian and politician (1861 – 1935)

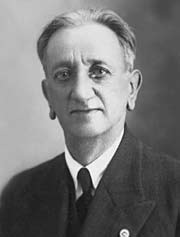
- Yazıksız in the 1930s
- Born: 29 December 1861; Kilis, Ottoman Empire
- Died: 12 December 1935 (aged 73); Istanbul, Turkey

Necip Asım Yazıksız (29 December 1861 – 12 December 1935) was a Turkish historian, linguist, and politician, known for his studies on various Turkish dialects and having served as MP in the 3rd, 4th, and 5th Parliaments of Turkey representing Erzurum.

== Early life and education ==
Necip Asım was born in Kilis on 29 December 1861 to Hacı Asım Bey, who was from a family of sipahis known as Balhasanoğlu. Necip Asım got his early education in his hometown. He first went to the military high school in Damascus (Turkish: Şam Askerî İdadisi) in 1875 and later transferred to Kuleli Military High School in Istanbul. There, he was taught by Ottoman scientist Hoca Tahsin Efendi and started writing on scientific topics in the Tercüman-ı Hakikat newspaper, encouraged by writer Ahmet Mithat. In 1879, he started the Turkish Military Academy in Harbiye, graduating in 1881 as an infantry lieutenant.

== Career ==
He started teaching French in various military schools. He became a first lieutenant in 1884, captain in 1886, and lieutenant colonel in 1908. Having also taught Turkish and history, he retired in 1913 as a colonel.

== Bibliography ==
- Böler, Tuncay (2009). "Necip Asım Yazıksız ve Türk Diline Katkıları". Türkiyat Araştırmaları Dergisi (in Turkish) (25): 195–208.
