= Feriköy =

- Neighbourhood
- A map of neighbourhoods of Şişli

- Location within Turkey Location within Istanbul
- Coordinates: 41°03′6″N 28°59′15″E
- Country: Turkey
- Province: Istanbul
- District: Şişli
- Population (2022): 14,081
- Time zone: UTC+3 (TRT)
- Area code: 0212

Feriköy is a neighbourhood in the municipality and district of Şişli, Istanbul Province, Turkey. Its population is 14,081 (2022). It is home to three large adjoining cemeteries, one for Roman Catholic burials, one for Protestant ones, and one for the Bulgarian community of Istanbul with an adjoining Sv. Dimitur Church (Istanbul). It adjoins fashionable Bomonti, with its towering hotel blocks.

== See also ==
- Feriköy S.K.
- Feriköy Protestant Cemetery
- Feriköy Cemetery
