= Macka =

Macka may refer to:

- Maçka, a municipality and district in Turkey
- Maçka, Istanbul, a neighborhood in Istanbul
  - Maçka Gondola, aerial lift line in Istanbul
- Mačka, an acrobatic glider produced in Yugoslavia
