= Maçka Gondola =

Istanbul aerial tramway line

Maçka-Taşkışla Gondola
- Maçka-Taşkışla Teleferik
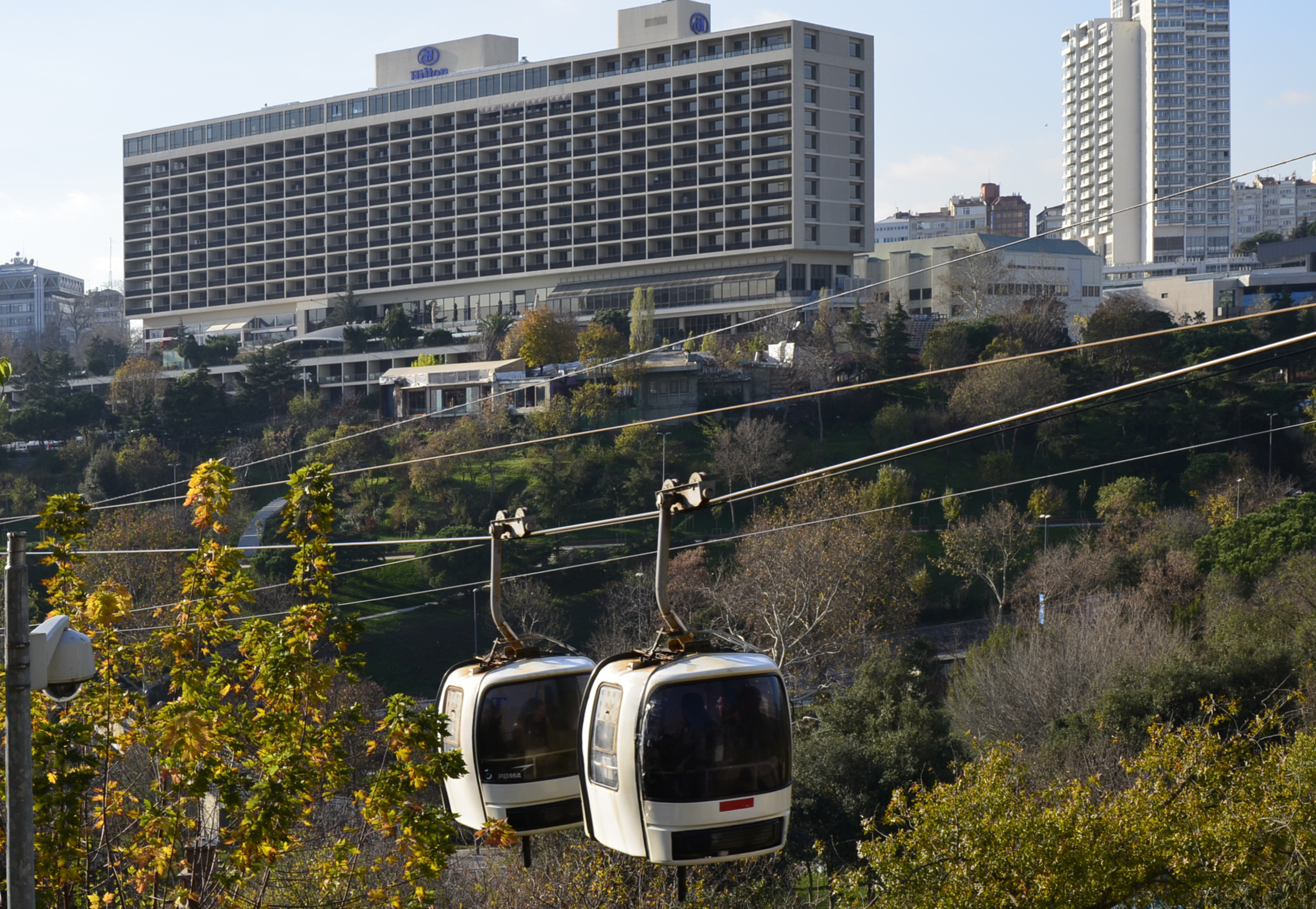
- Maçka Gondola with Hilton Istanbul Bosphorus in background seen from Maçka Terminal.

- Location within Istanbul

Overview
- Status: Operational
- Character: Urban
- System: Public transport in Istanbul
- Line no.: TF1
- Location: Maçka, Şişli, Istanbul
- Country: Turkey
- Coordinates: 41°02′41″N 28°59′38″E
- Termini: Maçka (northeast); Taşkışla (southwest)
- No. of stations: 2
- Built by: Baytur Inc.
- Open: April 11, 1993; 33 years ago
- Website: www.maçka-taskışla-teleferik

Operation
- Owner: Istanbul Metropolitan Municipality
- Operator: Istanbul Ulaşım AŞ
- No. of carriers: 4
- Ridership: 1,000 daily
- Operating times: 07:30–21:00 (weekdays), 08:00–19:00 (sundays)
- Trips daily: 90
- Headway: 5 minutes during peak hours
- Trip duration: 3.5 min.
- Fare: ₺1.95 (by Istanbulkart)

Technical features
- Aerial lift type: Bi-cable gondola fixed grip pulsed
- Manufactured by: Poma, France
- Line length: 333.5 m (1,094 ft)
- Operating speed: 4 m/s (13 ft/s)

The Maçka Gondola, aka Maçka – Taşkışla Aerial Cable Car, (Turkish: TF1 Maçka – Taşkışla teleferik hattı) is a two-station gondola-type line of aerial lift passenger transport system situated in Şişli district of Istanbul, Turkey. Opened on April 11, 1993, the 333.5 m (1,094 ft) long line connects Maçka neighborhood with Taşkışla quarter close to Taksim Square. It is operated under the line number Tf1 by Istanbul Transport Company, a subsidiary of Istanbul Metropolitan Municipality. The fare is paid by the contactless smart card of Istanbulkart, which is valid at all public transport in Istanbul.

The gondola line was constructed to provide easy access between Maçka and Taşkışla, two localities in the center of the city separated from each other by a 42 m (138 ft) deep green valley. They are normally connected by a long horseshoe-shaped path around the valley, which contains the Maçka Democracy Park and the Beyoğlu Marriage Office. While the Maçka Station is a gateway to the upscale neighborhoods Teşvikiye and Nişantaşı, the Taşkışla Station is in walking distance to Taksim Square. There exist campuses of the Istanbul Technical University on both sides of the valley as well as a number of five-star hotels like ParkSA Hilton Hotel, Swissôtel Istanbul The Bosphorus Hotel at the Maçka side and Hilton Istanbul Bosphorus, Hyatt Regency, Divan Istanbul at the Taşkışla side. The Cemil Topuzlu Open-Air Theatre is situated close to the Taşkışla Station.

== Gondola lift system ==
The line was designed and the system was delivered by the French company Poma, and the construction was carried out by Turkish company Baytur. It is a two-station overhead transport system without any support tower in the middle of the line distance.

The pulse-movement gondola system runs two sets of two unidirectional six-seater tandem cabins. In each direction, there are two ropes, one for carriyng and the other for hauling the cabins. The cabins stop at the terminal, and they are accelerated to line speed at 4 m/s (13 ft/s) after leaving the terminal. In case of power supply cut, a standby generator ensures the travel of the cabins to the target station at a low speed.

Fare is collected for both directions at the Maçka Terminal.

== Specifications ==
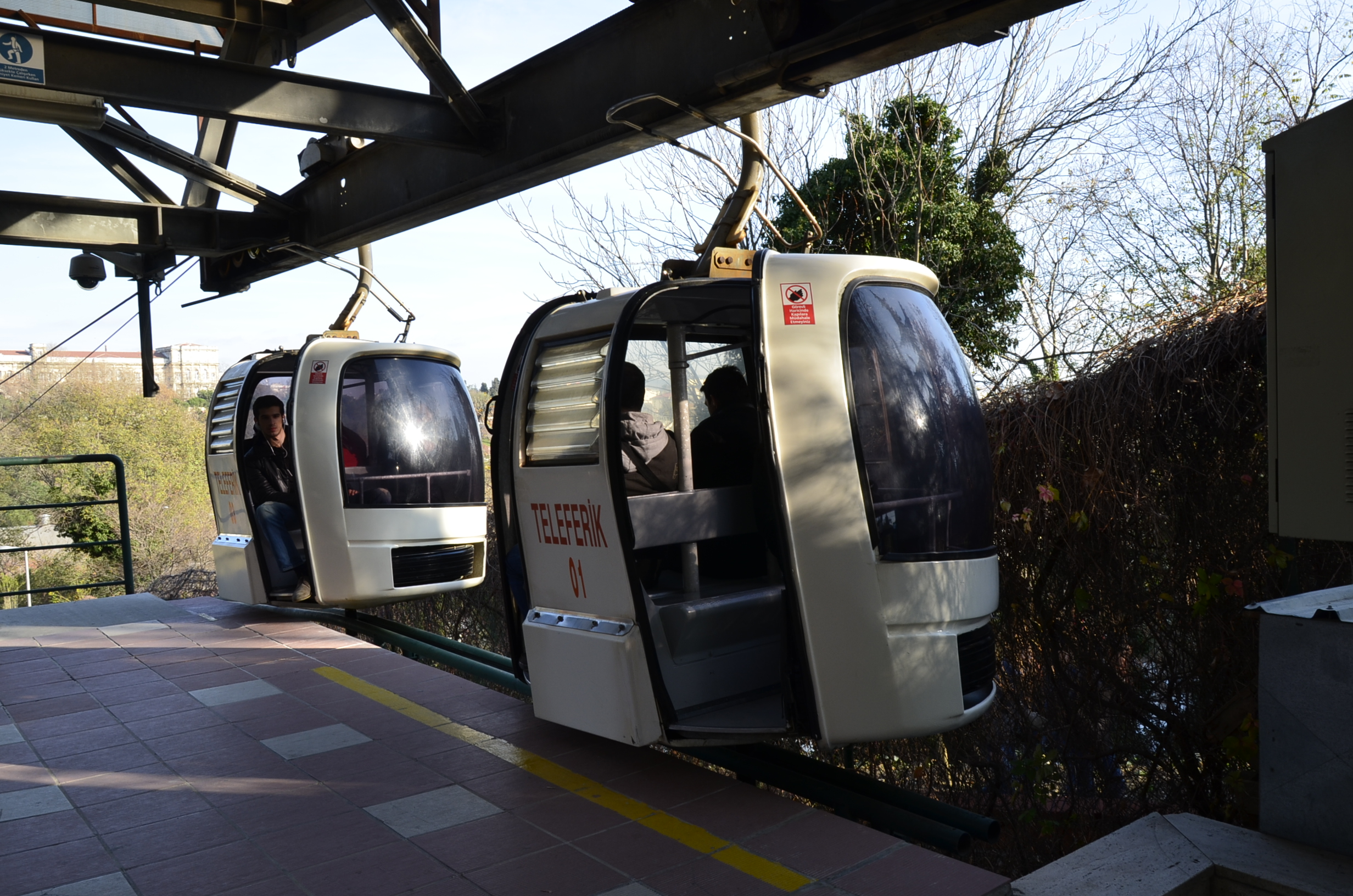
Maçka Gondola tandem cabins at Taşkışla Terminal.

- Line length: 333.5 m (1,094 ft)
- Number of stations: 2
- Number of cabins: 4
- Trip duration: 3.5 minutes
- Operational hours: 07:30–21:00 (weekdays), 08:00–19:00 (Sundays)
- Daily ridership: 1,000 passengers daily
- Number of daily trips: 90
- Frequency: 5 minutes during peak hours
- Fare: ₺2.30 (by Istanbulkart)

== Stations ==
No	Station	District	Transfer	Notes
1	Maçka	Şişli	İETT Bus: 26, 26A, 26B, 30A, 30M	Teşvikiye Mosque・Maçka Park
2	Taşkışla	Şişli	İETT Bus:	

== See also ==
- List of gondola lifts in Turkey
