= Mehmet Celal Bey =

Turkish statesman known for rescuing Armenians

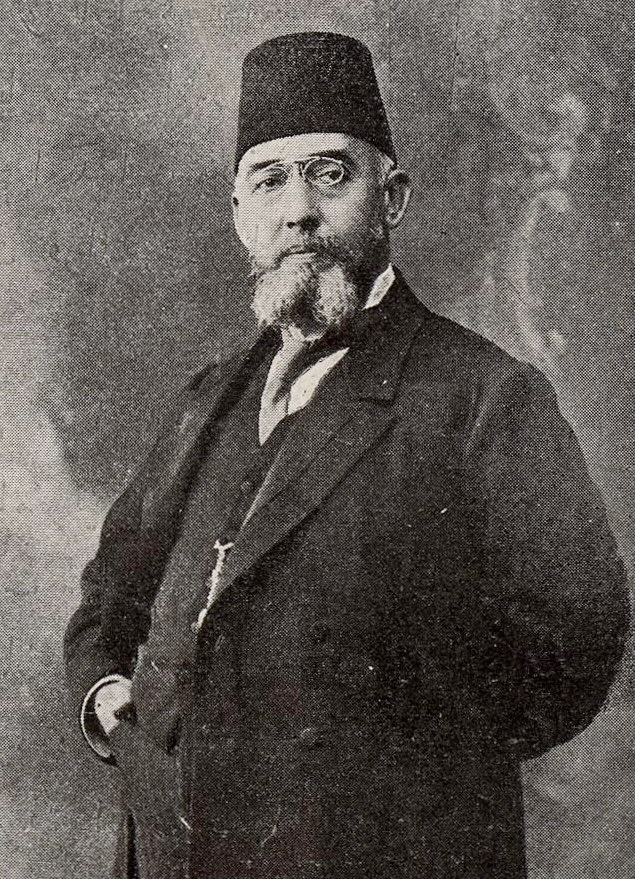

Personal details
- Born: 1863 Kadıköy, Constantinople, Ottoman Empire
- Died: 15 February 1926 (aged 62–63) Osmanbey, Istanbul, Turkey
- Spouse: Rukiye Hanım

Mehmet Celal Bey (Ottoman Turkish: محمد جلال بك; 1863 – 15 February 1926) was an Ottoman-born Turkish statesman and a key witness to the Armenian genocide. During his career as a politician, Celal Bey served as governor of the Ottoman provinces associated with the cities Erzurum, Aleppo, Aydın, Edirne, Konya, and Adana. He also served as minister of the interior and minister of agriculture as well as mayor of Istanbul. Celal Bey is known for having saved many lives during the Armenian genocide by defying deportation orders, which were preludes to starvation and massacres. As a result, he was removed from his post as governor in Aleppo and transferred to Konya, where he was again dismissed upon continuing to obstruct deportations. Today, he is often called the Turkish Oskar Schindler.

== Early life ==
Mehmet Celal Bey was born in 1863 in Kiziltoprak, Kadıköy, a suburb of Constantinople (today-Istanbul) in the Ottoman Empire. His father, Hasan Atif Bey, was an official of the ministry of finance. Celal Bey graduated from Mekteb-i Mülkiye (now the Faculty of Political Science, Ankara University) in 1881. He then studied agricultural science at Bonn University in Germany for three years. He returned to Constantinople where he married a woman named Rukiye Hanım. Celal Bey became a geography teacher at a teacher's institute (darülmuallimin) in 1883. In 1884 he became the principal of Kastamonu High School. Thereafter, he served various administrative posts, including as an officer at the Beyoğlu Telegraph Center in 1887. Celal Bey then became the director of public instruction in Trabzon, Kastamonu and Selanik (today Thessaloniki). In 1900 he resumed teaching geography, as a professor at Darülfünün. He eventually became the principal of Mekteb-i Mülkiye-i Şahane from 1908 to 1910.

== Political career ==
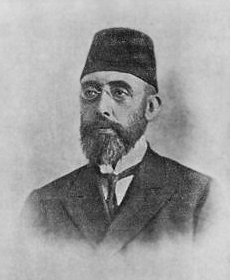
1911 published photo of Mehmet Celal Bey

In March 1910, Mehmet Celal Bey was appointed governor of Erzurum. He served there until July 1911, when he was transferred to Edirne; in October 1911 he became governor of Aydin and served there until August 1912. Meanwhile, he served as minister of the interior from December 1911 to July 1912 and as minister of agriculture from January to June 1913. He was appointed governor of Aleppo in July 1913. It was during his tenure in Aleppo that he first witnessed and protested the deportations and massacres of the Armenian genocide. Due to his defiance of the official policy against the Armenians, Celal Bey was removed from his post in Aleppo in June 1915 and transferred to Konya. After further resisting deportation orders in Konya, he was again dismissed from his post as governor on 3 October 1915.

After the end of World War I, he was appointed governor of Adana in November 1919 and served there until August 1920. He was mayor of Istanbul from July 1921 to March 1922.

== Witness to the Armenian genocide ==
In April 1915, the Ottoman government began the systematic extermination of its minority Armenian subjects, today known as the Armenian genocide. The genocide carried out during World War I was implemented in two phases: the wholesale killing of the able-bodied male population through executions and subjection of army conscripts to forced labour, followed by the deportation of women, children, the elderly and infirm on death marches towards the Syrian Desert. Driven forward by military escorts, the deportees were deprived of food and water and subjected to periodic robbery, rape, and massacre.

During these events, Celal Bey was able to save thousands of lives; he is often called the Turkish Oskar Schindler. While serving as governor of Aleppo, Mehmet Celal Bey initially did not understand that the deportations were meant to "annihilate" the Armenians: "I admit, I did not believe that these orders, these actions revolved around the annihilation of the Armenians. I never imagined that any government could take upon itself to annihilate its own citizens in this manner, in effect destroying its human capital, which must be seen as the country's greatest treasure. I presumed that the actions being carried out were measures deriving from a desire to temporarily remove the Armenians from the theater of war and taken as the result of wartime exigencies." However, Celal Bey later realized that he was mistaken and that the goal was an "attempt to annihilate" the Armenians.

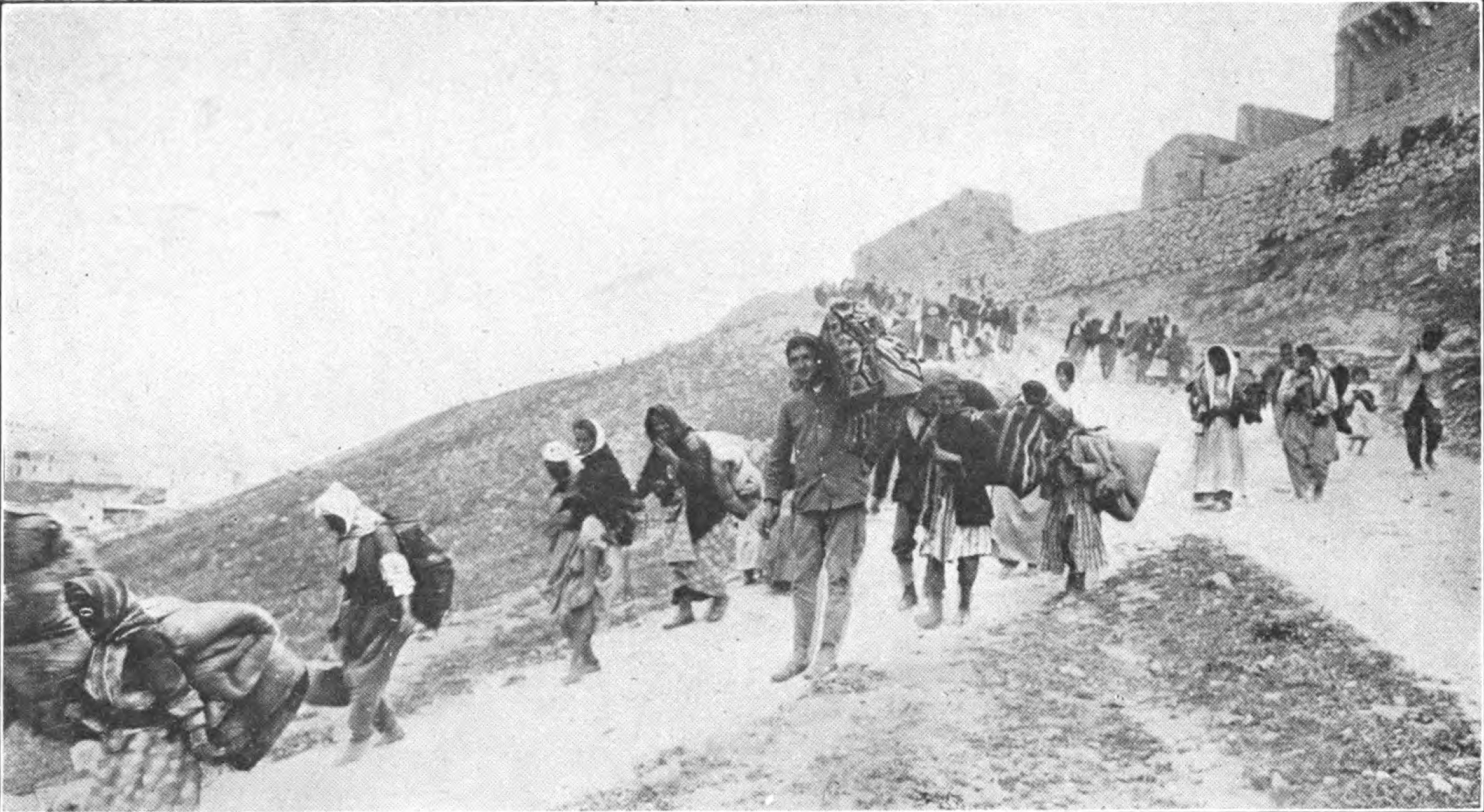
Deportation of Armenians

Upon defying the deportation orders, Celal Bey was removed from his post as governor of Aleppo in June 1915 and transferred to Konya. As deportations continued, he repeatedly demanded from the central authorities that shelter be provided for the deportees. Celal Bey also sent many telegraphs and letters of protest to the central government stating that the "measures taken against the Armenians were, from every point of view, contrary to the higher interests of the fatherland." His demands and protests, however, were ignored.

Under the pretext of seeking treatment for an eye condition, Celal Bey went to Constantinople and visited the headquarters of the Committee of Union and Progress to raise his objections to the deportations in Konya. He set out to return only after receiving assurances from the central authorities that such deportations would not happen. However, by the time he got back to Konya almost all of the city's Armenians had already been deported. Some Armenian families who hadn't yet been deported were saved by Celal Bey's efforts. He explained in an interview with the newspaper Jamanak in 1918 that "The capital was constantly pressurizing me to send them on, and to exile them. However, I could not breach my conscience." On 3 October 1915, Celal Bey was dismissed from his post as governor of Konya for defying the deportation orders. After his removal, the remaining Armenians, consisting of 10,000 people, were deported within three days.

Mehmet Celal Bey compared himself to "a person sitting by the side of a river, with absolute no means of saving anyone. Blood was flowing in the river and thousands of innocent children, irreproachable old people, helpless women, strong young men, were streaming down this river towards oblivion. Anyone I could save with my bare hands I saved, and the others, I think they streamed down the river never to return."

== Death ==
On 15 February 1926, Mehmet Celal Bey died from a heart attack in his home in Osmanbey, Istanbul. His funeral was attended by thousands of both Turks and Armenians.
