= Pangaltı =

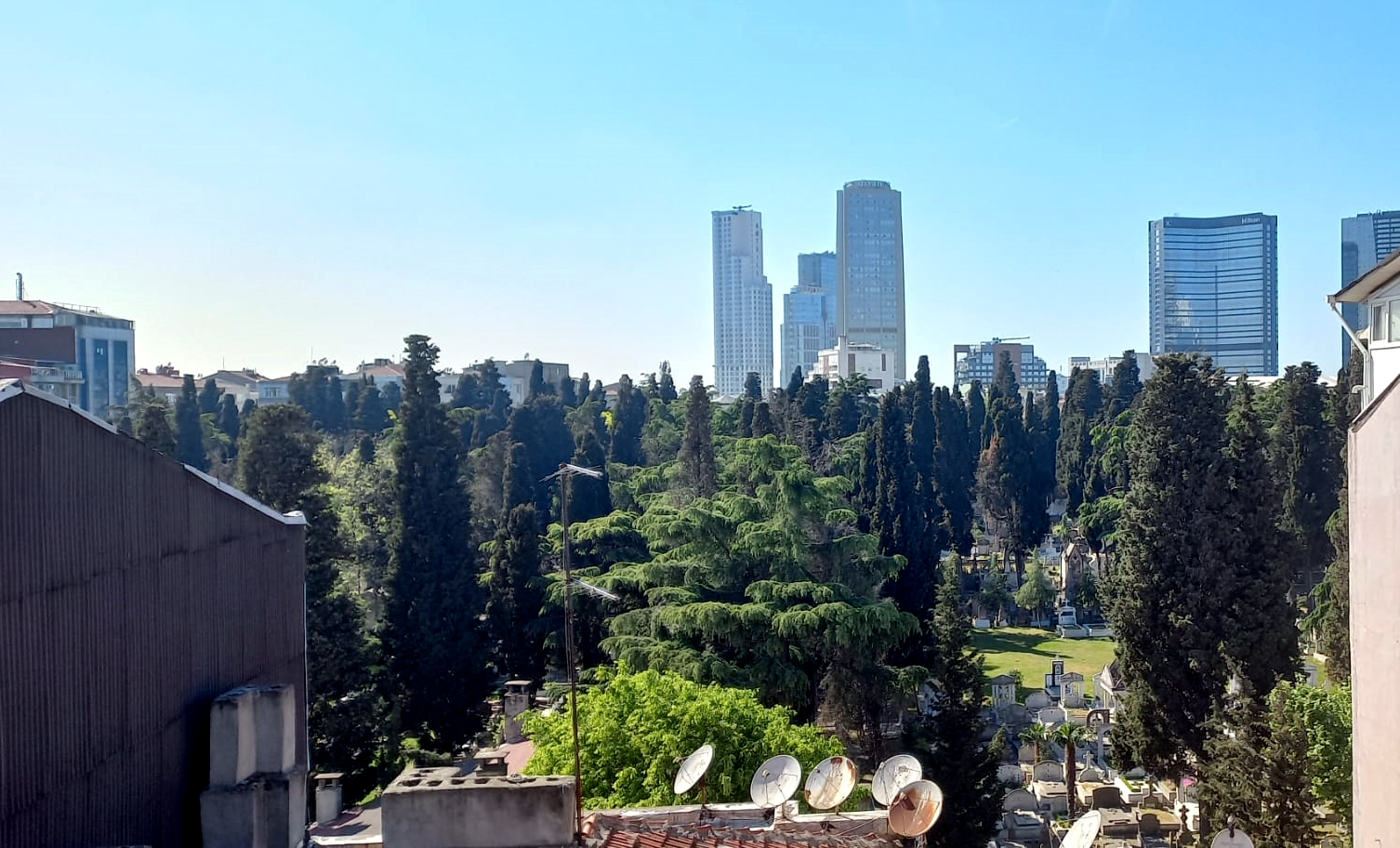
- Pangaltı Roman Catholic Cemetery

- Location of Şişli in Istanbul
- Coordinates: 41°03′5.94″N 28°59′15.2376″E
- Country: Turkey
- Province: Istanbul
- District: Şişli
- Time zone: GMT +3
- Area code: (+90) 212

Pangaltı (spelled Pangaaltı or Pancaldi in some older sources) is one of the four neighborhoods (together with Teşvikiye, Maçka and Osmanbey) within the Nişantaşı quarter of the Şişli district in Istanbul, Turkey.

It is home to the Cathedral of the Holy Spirit and Pangaltı Catholic Cemetery, the largest Catholic cemetery in Istanbul.

== History ==
The neighborhood was formerly inhabited mainly by Levantine Christians. The Ottoman Army War College founded by Sultan Mahmud II had its headquarters in this city quarter from 1848.

As part of the 1860s redevelopment of Istanbul, when the avenue between Taksim and Pangaltı was under construction in 1864, Christian cemeteries in Taksim were moved to Şişli and a garden-park (Taksim Gezisi) was arranged in their place. The Anarad Hiğutyun (Armenian for "Immaculate Conception") Armenian Catholic Church (Anarad Hiğutyun Ermeni Katolik Kilisesi ) was built in 1866 in timber, and from 1971-1973 rebuilt in stone.

The Private Armenian School of Pangaltı (former Mihitaryan Ermeni Mektebi or "Mihitaryan School"), established in Kandilli in 1811 serves the public in the quarter since 1866. It was associated with the school of the Armenian Sisters of the Immaculate Conception who were founded in Istanbul in 1847. The school continues today.

During the bombing of Istanbul, the area suffered on 18 October 1918.

== See also ==
- Pangaltı Armenian Cemetery
