= Taşkışla =

Coordinates: 41.0411°N 28.9900°E

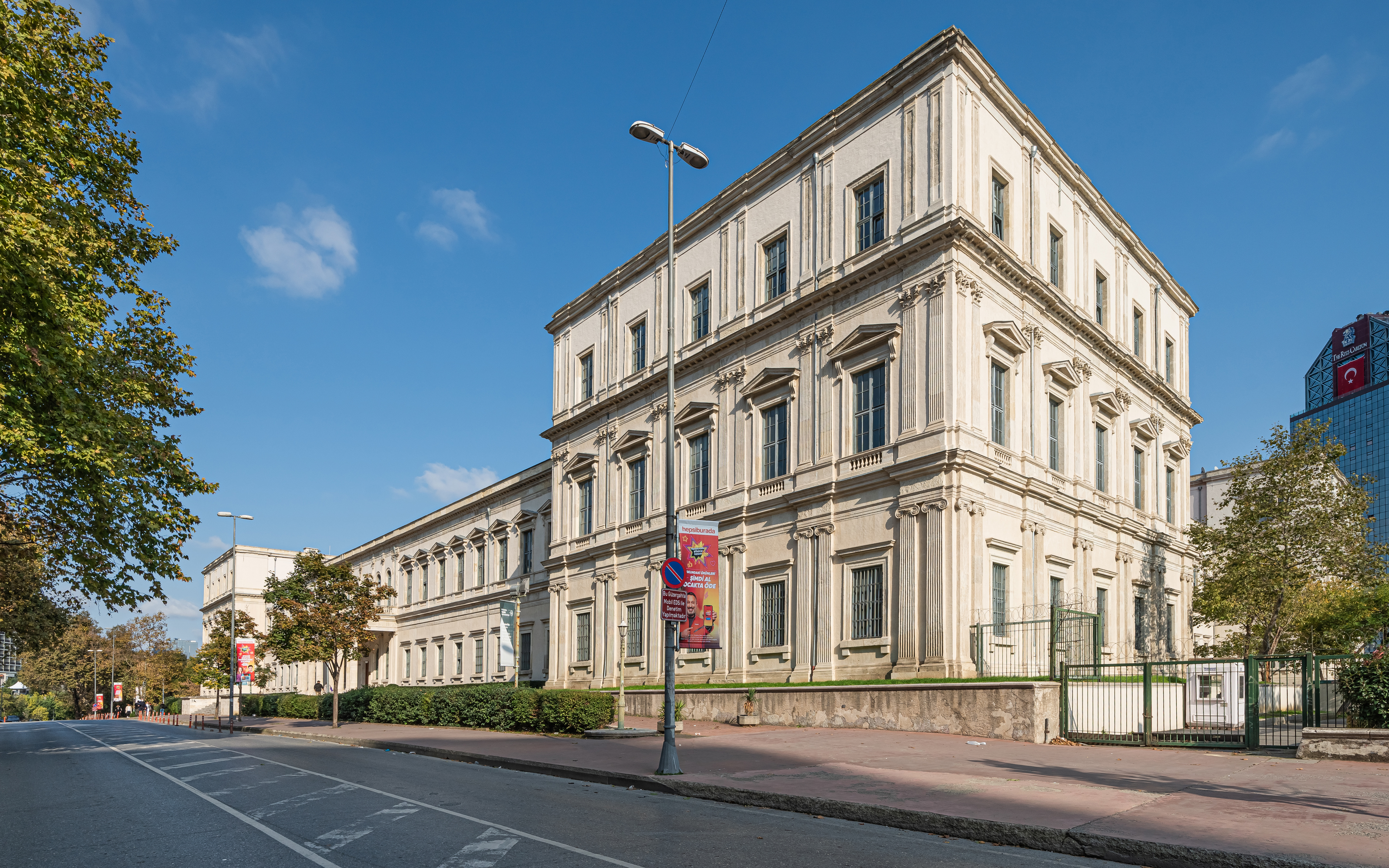
The barracks were originally designed as a medical school building

Taşkışla (pronounced [taʃˈkɯʃla]) is a neighborhood and building complex in Istanbul. It takes its name Stone Barracks from its use as a military establishment in the Ottoman period also known as Mecidiye Kışlası. It is located in close proximity to Beyoğlu and home to the Architecture faculty of the Istanbul Technical University and today serves as a terminus for the Maçka Gondola cable car line.

== History ==
English architect Williams James Smith built the houses of the Taşkışla in neo-Renaissance style over the years 1846 to 1852. The site was converted to military barracks in 1860, tasked with the protection of Dolmabahçe Palace.

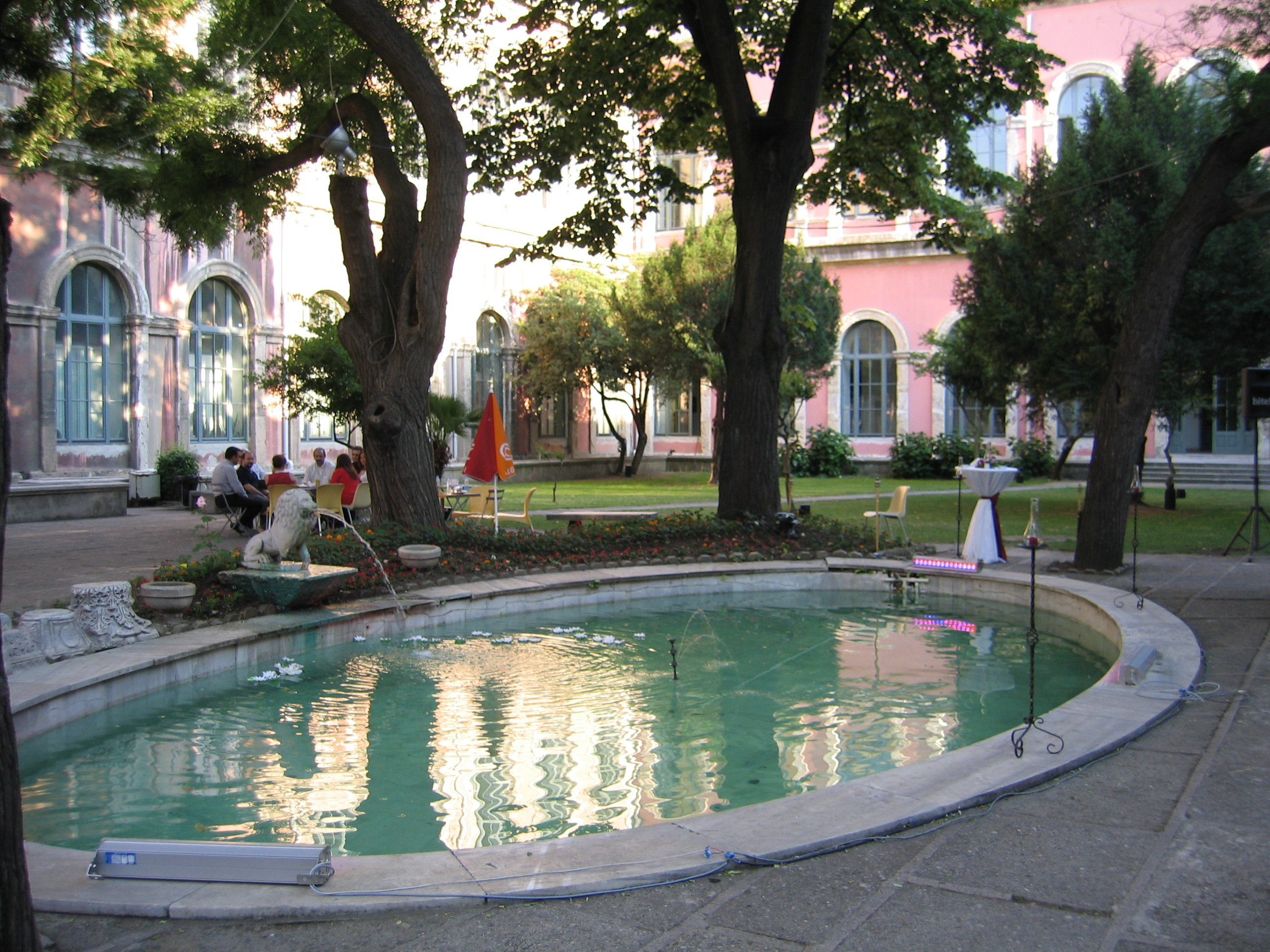
The Architecture faculty of the Istanbul Technical University located in this neighborhood.

The buildings were assigned to the Ministry of Education after the formation of the Republic of Turkey and were renovated by German architect Paul Bonatz and Emin Onat between 1943 and 1950. After a period of controversial use as a hotel the site was returned to the Istanbul Technical University in 1989.
