= Nişantaşı =

Quarter of Istanbul, Turkey

Coordinates: 41°03′06″N 28°59′29″E

- Quarter
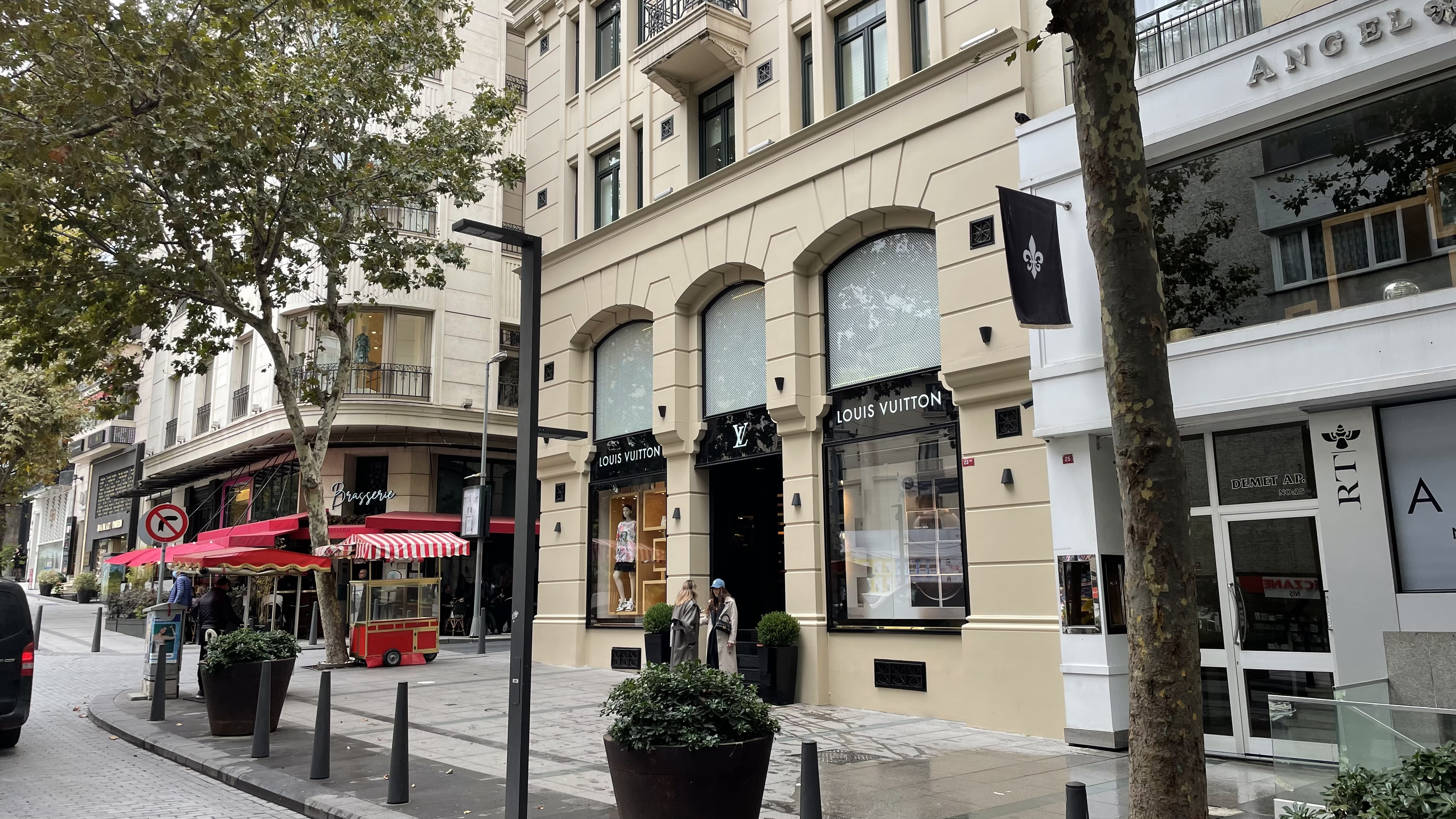
- Nişantaşı

- Location of Şişli in Istanbul

- Location within Istanbul Location within Europe
- Country: Turkey
- Province: Istanbul
- District: Şişli
- Time zone: GMT +2
- Area code: (+90) 212

Nişantaşı is a residential quarter in the Şişli district on the European side of Istanbul, Turkey. Nişantaşı quarter has four neighbourhoods: Teşvikiye, Maçka, Osmanbey and Pangaltı. The centre of the Nişantaşı quarter is at the neighbourhood of Teşvikiye, which is separated from the neighbourhood of Osmanbey to the west by the Vali Konağı Avenue and Rumeli Avenue. Osmanbey is separated from the Pangaltı neighbourhood further to the west by the busy Halaskargazi Avenue in Şişli. The neighbourhood of Maçka is immediately to the south of Teşvikiye. Nişantaşı is a popular shopping quarter, full of boutiques, department stores, cafés, pubs, restaurants and night clubs. Many of the streets are still full of fine 19th and early 20th-century apartment blocks. Directly to the south lies the large and wooded Maçka Park, and to the east the Beşiktaş district.

Nişantaşı provides the backdrop for several novels by Nobel laureate Turkish novelist Orhan Pamuk, a local resident for many years. Journalist Ece Temelkuran compared the neighbourhood to Greenwich Village, Manhattan.

The nearest metro stop to the central part of the Nişantaşı quarter is the Osmanbey metro station on the M2 line. Many bus and dolmuş services plough up and down Halaskargazi Avenue, linking Nişantaşı to Taksim and Mecidiyeköy. It's also quite easy to reach the ferries by foot in Beşiktaş shore.

== History ==
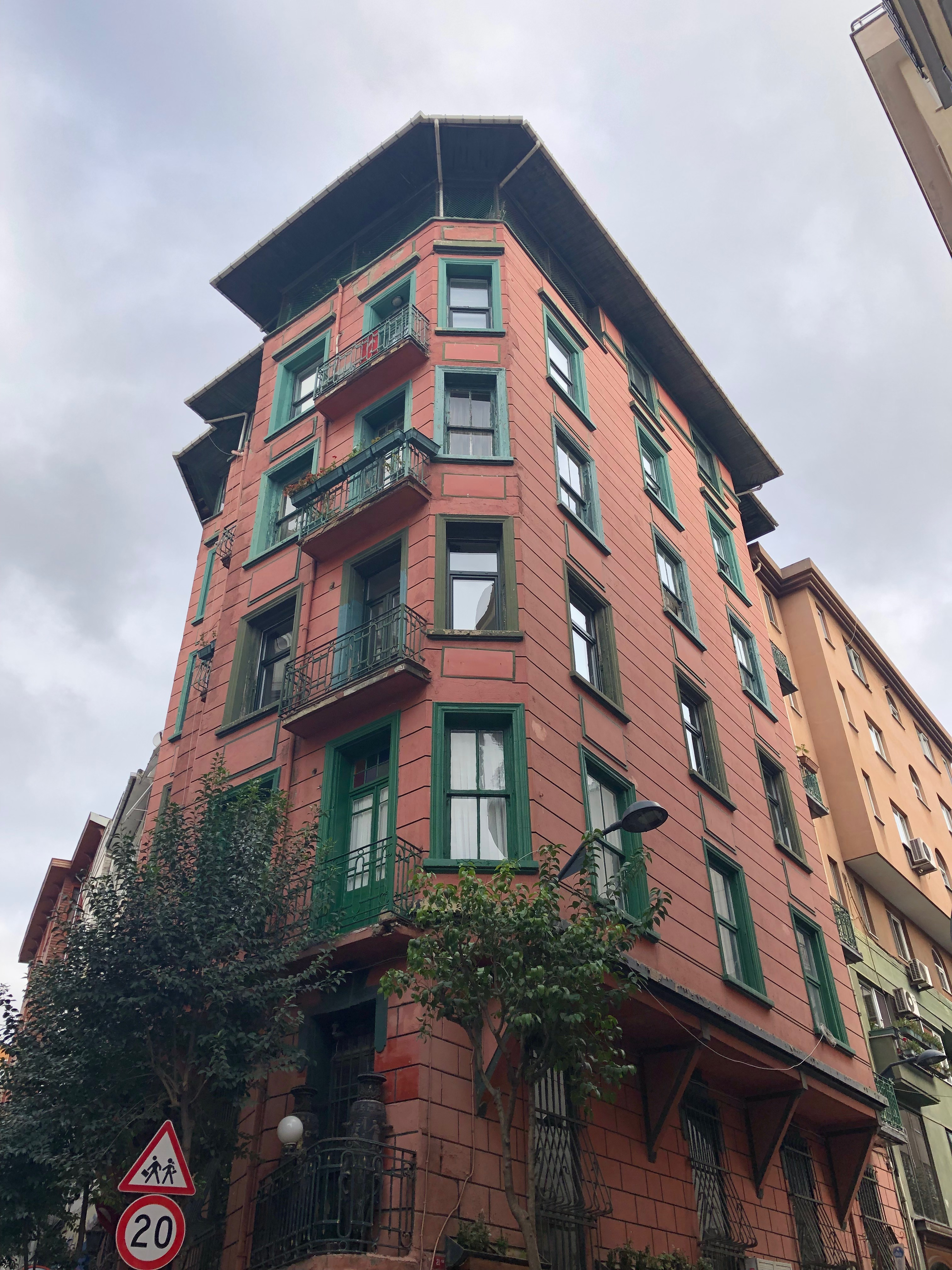
Sütçüoğlu Apartment

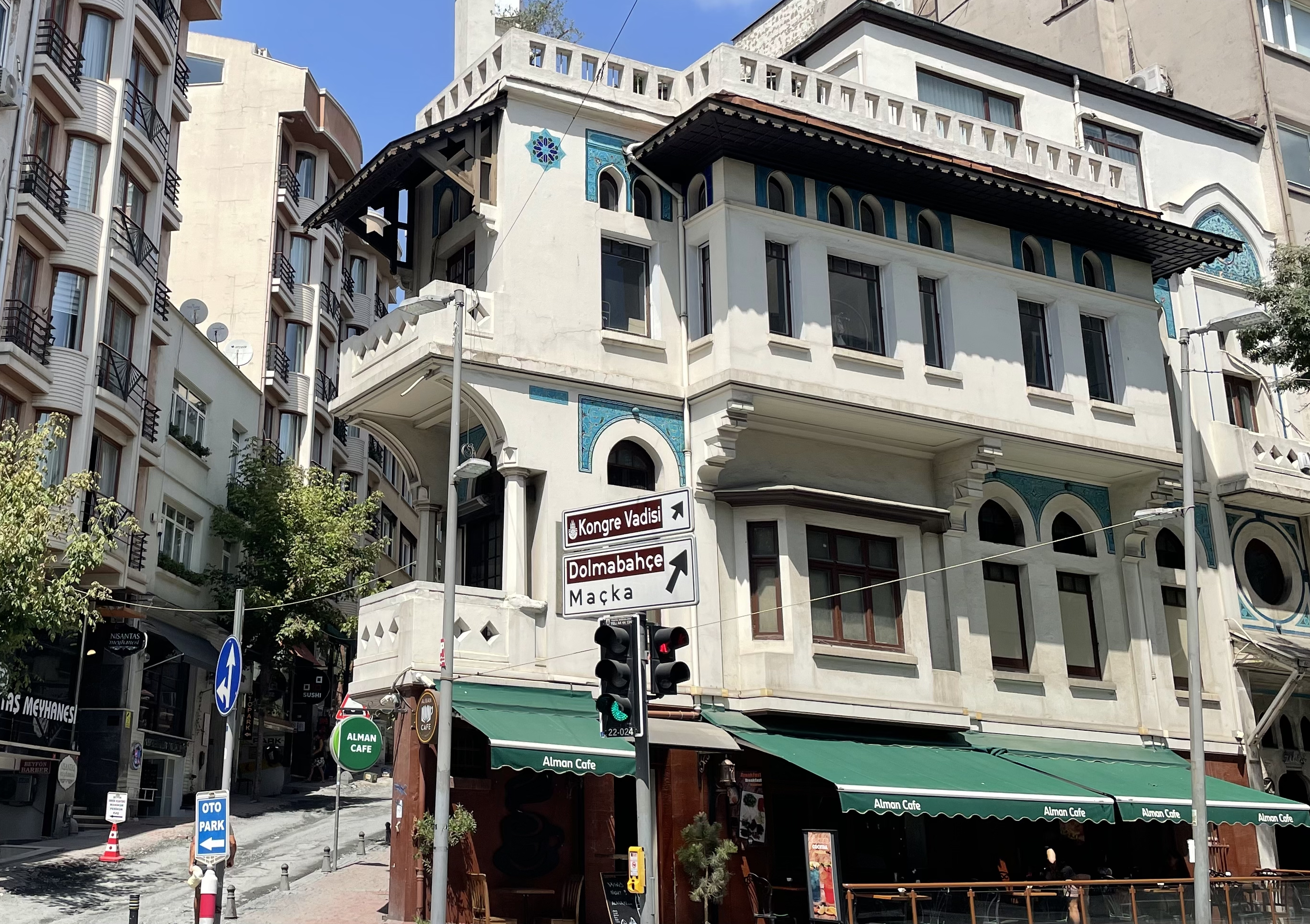
Vedat Tek House

In the middle of the 19th century, Nişantaşı was established by Ottoman Sultan Abdülmecid I who erected a pair of small obelisks to define the extents of the new quarter. It was Abdülmecid I who ordered the construction of the Neo-Classical Teşvikiye Police Station and the Neo-Baroque Teşvikiye Mosque to create a proper quarter, encouraging Constantinopolitans to settle in the area (hence the name Teşvikiye which means "Encouragement" in Ottoman Turkish).

The word Nişantaşı (nişan taşı) means "target stone" or more precisely "aiming stone" in Turkish. Target (aiming) stones were erected in the Ottoman period to mark the records of Ottoman archers, including sultans. Shaped either as small obelisks or columns with Ottoman Turkish inscriptions on them, some of these target stones still serve as monuments to Nişantaşı's past, their inscriptions recording when a particular arrow was shot and by whom, as well as recording the distance it flew.

Following the Balkan Wars of 1912–1913, many Turks from Macedonia, especially Thessaloniki (Selânik, which was an Ottoman metropolis until 1912) settled in the Nişantaşı quarter of Istanbul, including the family of the famous Turkish poet Nâzım Hikmet. Apart from the Turks, the quarter also had sizeable Greek, Jewish, Armenian, and Levantine communities.

In 1923 many Dönme moved to the area from Thessaloniki after the Greek-Turkish population exchange. Arriving in Nişantaşı, they started to live in the abandoned Greek houses and apartment flats. A few of their descendants still live in Nişantaşı, where they are a tightly knit community.

== Attractions ==
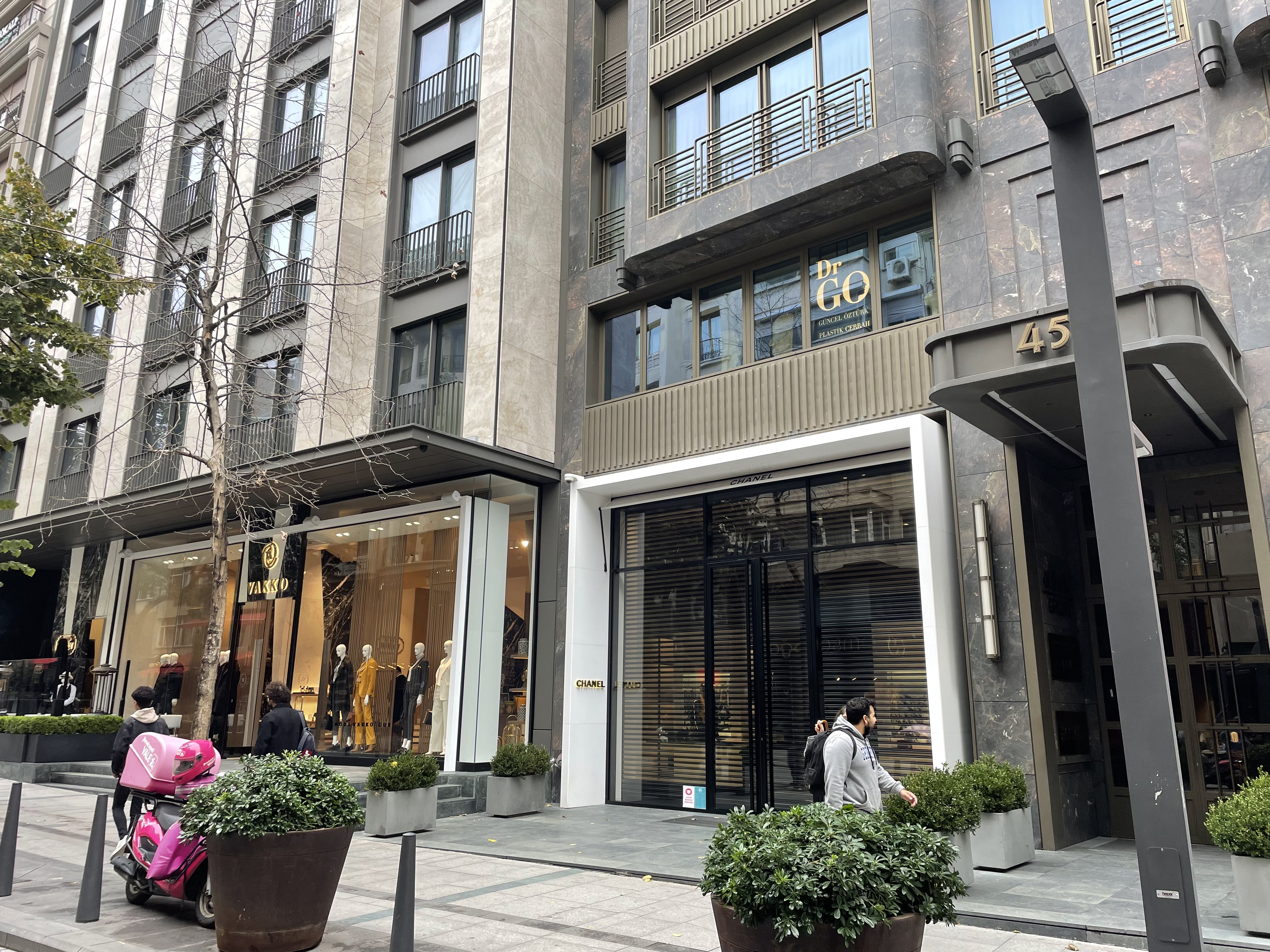
Vakko Store on Abdi İpekçi Street

On Vali Konağı Avenue stands the house of Turkish architect Vedat Tek, designed and built by himself in 1913–14. Its facade displays many of the features of the First National Architecture style, with which he was associated, including thick lancet windows, tiled panels and protruding Seljuk style stone roundels.

Built in 1853 on the site of an older mosque, the elegant Tesvikye Mosque was once associated with the Dönmes who had arrived from Salonica (now Thessaloniki) during the 1923 population exchange between Greece and Turkey. The founder of Atlantic Records, Ahmet Ertegun's funeral was held here in 2006. Two target (aiming) stones (nişan taşı) for archery, dating back to the late 18th and early 19th centuries, stand inside the mosque's courtyard. There are numerous other aiming stones within the quarter; one of the most renowned examples, named Anıt Taş and shaped as a small obelisk, is located at the corner between Teşvikiye Avenue and Vali Konağı Avenue.

In 1979, Abdi İpekçi, the editor-in-chief of the daily newspaper Milliyet (which was back then owned by the Karacan family and reflected Kemalist, secularist and centre-left views), was shot and killed near Teşvikiye Mosque by Mehmet Ali Ağca, the man who went on to shoot at Pope John Paul II in 1981. A memorial statue marks the spot where Abdi İpekçi was killed. He was the cousin of both İsmail Cem İpekçi (who served as the Minister of Culture and Tourism in 1995 and Minister of Foreign Affairs between 1997 and 2002) and Cemil İpekçi (a renowned Turkish fashion designer).

The Park Hyatt Hotel is housed in the Maçka Palas building which started life as an apartment block designed by Giulio Mongeri in 1922. In different periods, it was inhabited by the third Turkish president Celâl Bayar, the poet and politician Abdülhak Hamid Tarhan and Turgay Şeren, a goalkeeper for the Galatasaray football team.

== Educational Facilities ==
Maçka Technical High School (Maçka Teknik Lisesi) was originally designed by Giulio Mongeri and constructed by the Italians to serve as their country's new embassy in Istanbul. However, when Ankara became Turkey's new capital in 1923, it was donated to the Turkish Republic. Construction works were not completed until 1970, when it was turned into a technical high school.

There are three public primary schools on Nişantaşı Avenue (Nilüfer Hatun Primary School, Sait Çiftçi Primary School, and Maçka Primary School) and two public high schools (Rüştü Uzel High School, Nuri Akın High School).

The prestigious Feyziye Mektepleri Vakfı Işık Okulları (Feyziye Schools Foundation Işık Private Schools) is a private school incorporating a kindergarten, primary school and high school . It was established in 1885 as the Şemsi Efendi Primary School in the Ottoman city of Selânik (Mustafa Kemal Atatürk, the founder and first President of the Republic of Turkey, was a student of the Şemsi Efendi Primary School.)

Several faculty buildings of Istanbul Technical University (ITU) and Marmara University are also located here. The ITU is housed in what was once the Maçka Barracks designed by members of the Balyan family of architects.

== Gallery ==
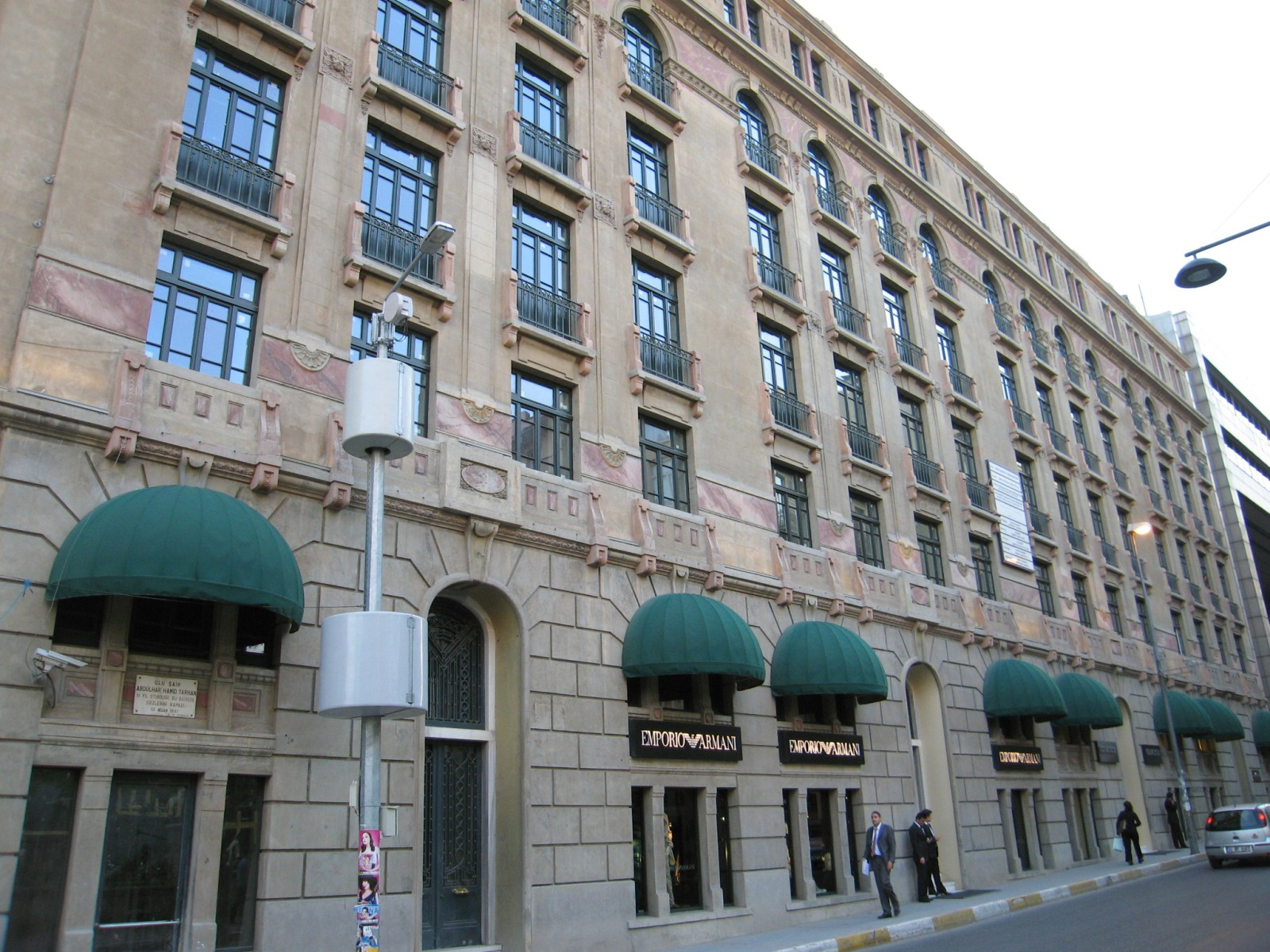
Maçka Palas (1922) designed by Giulio Mongeri houses the Park Hyatt Hotel, Emporio Armani, Armani Café and Gucci stores.

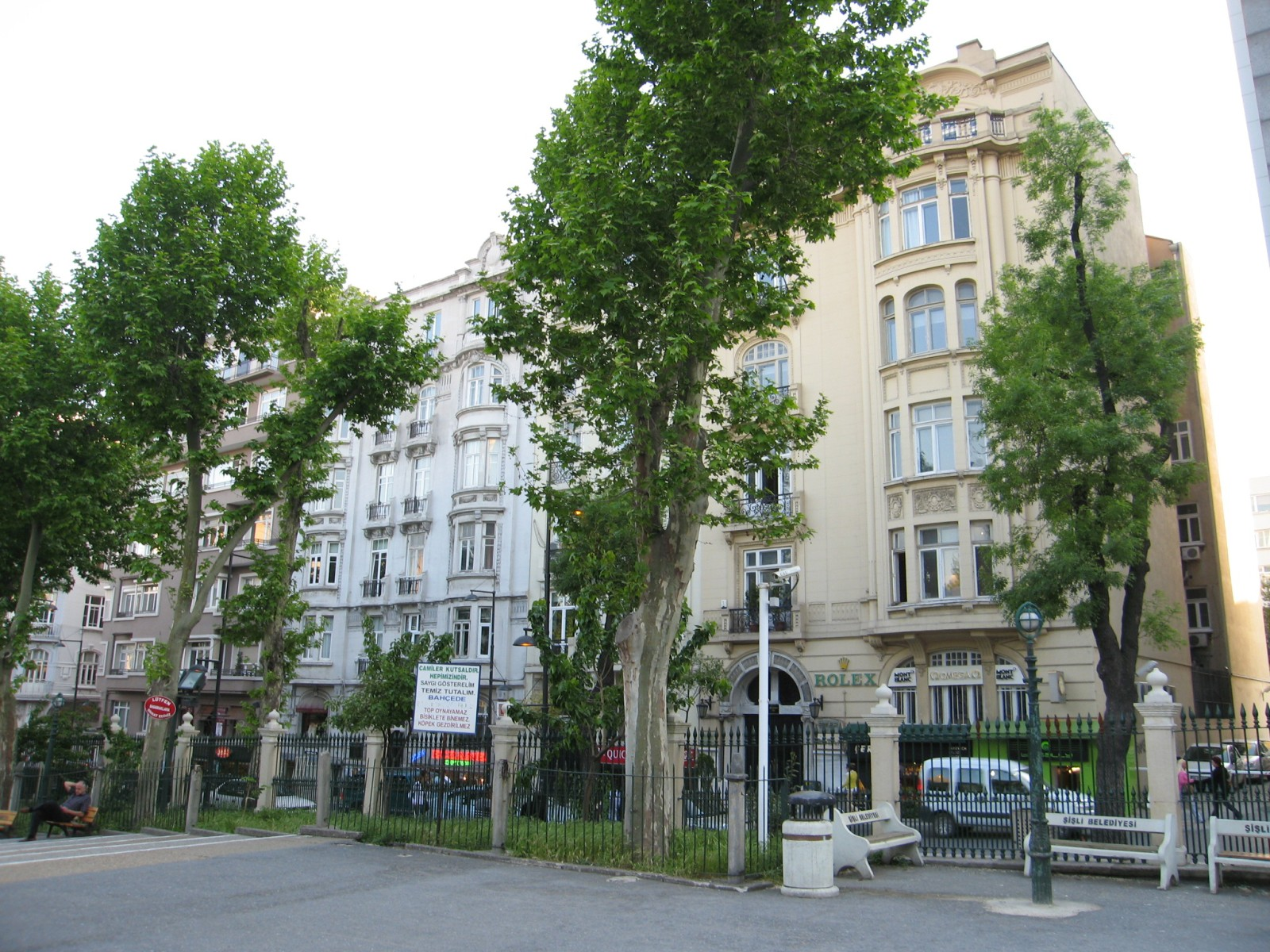
Art Nouveau style apartment buildings in Teşvikiye, Nişantaşı.

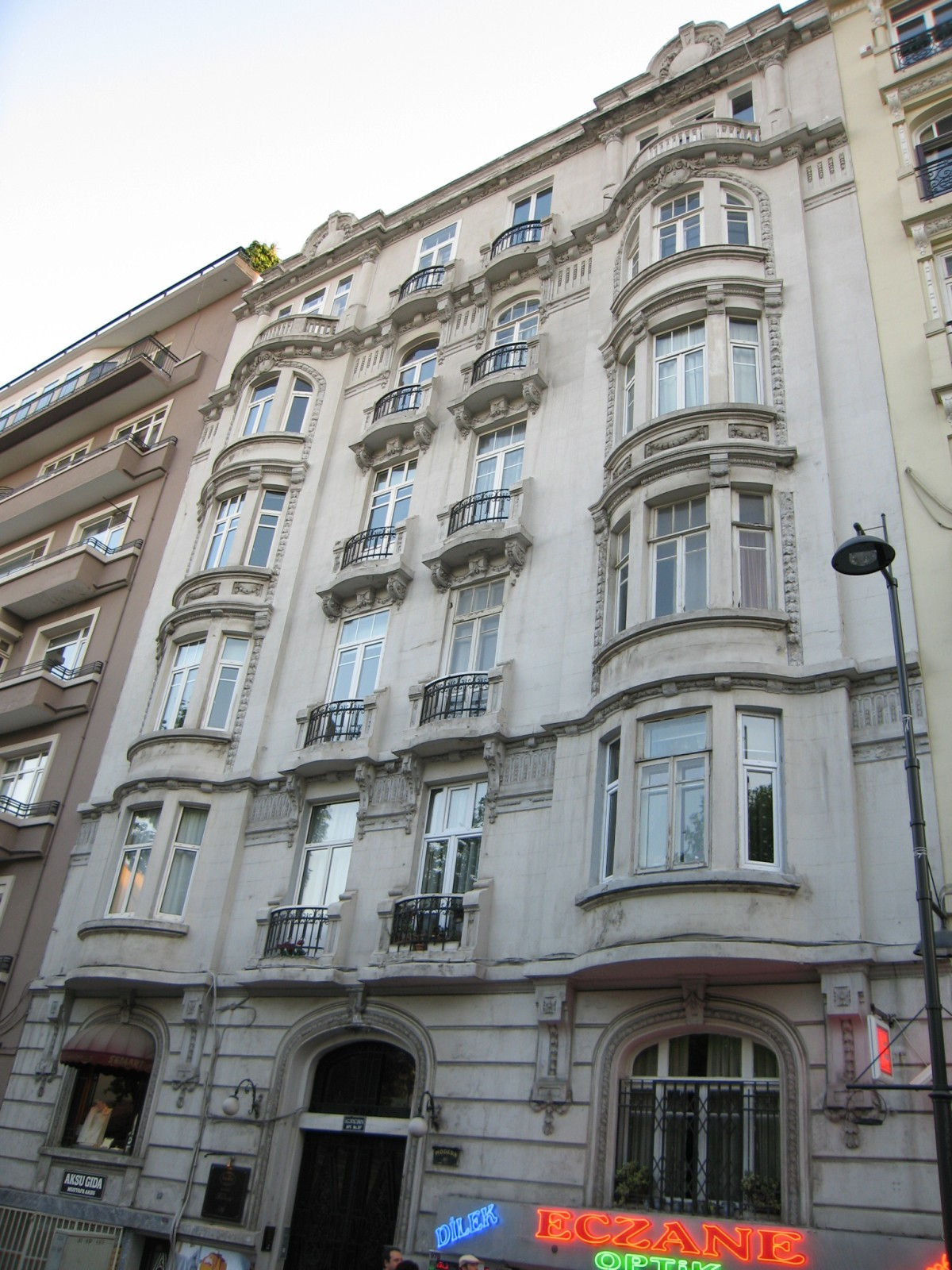
Art Nouveau style apartment buildings in Teşvikiye, Nişantaşı.

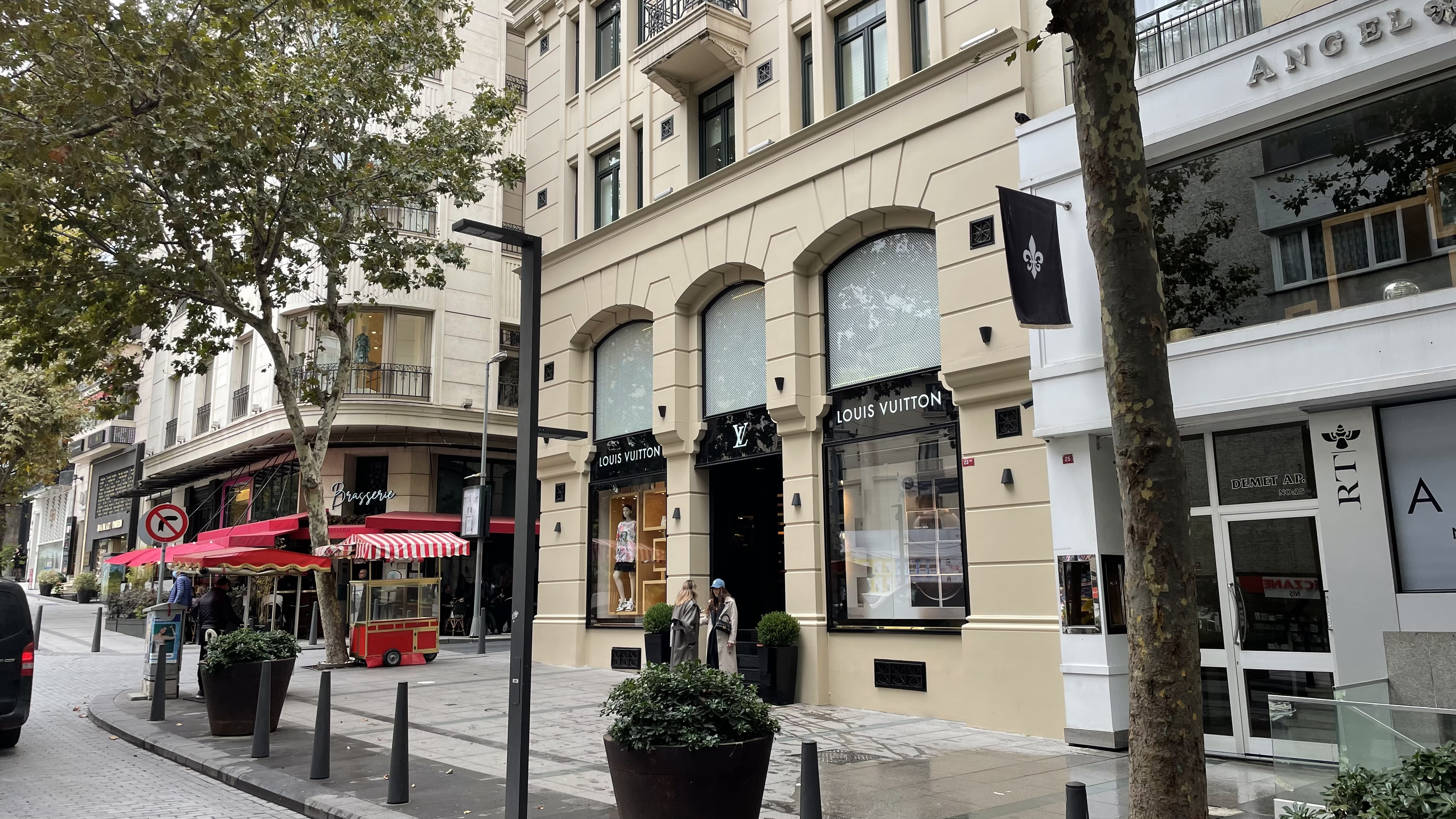
Abdi İpekçi Avenue in Nişantaşı.

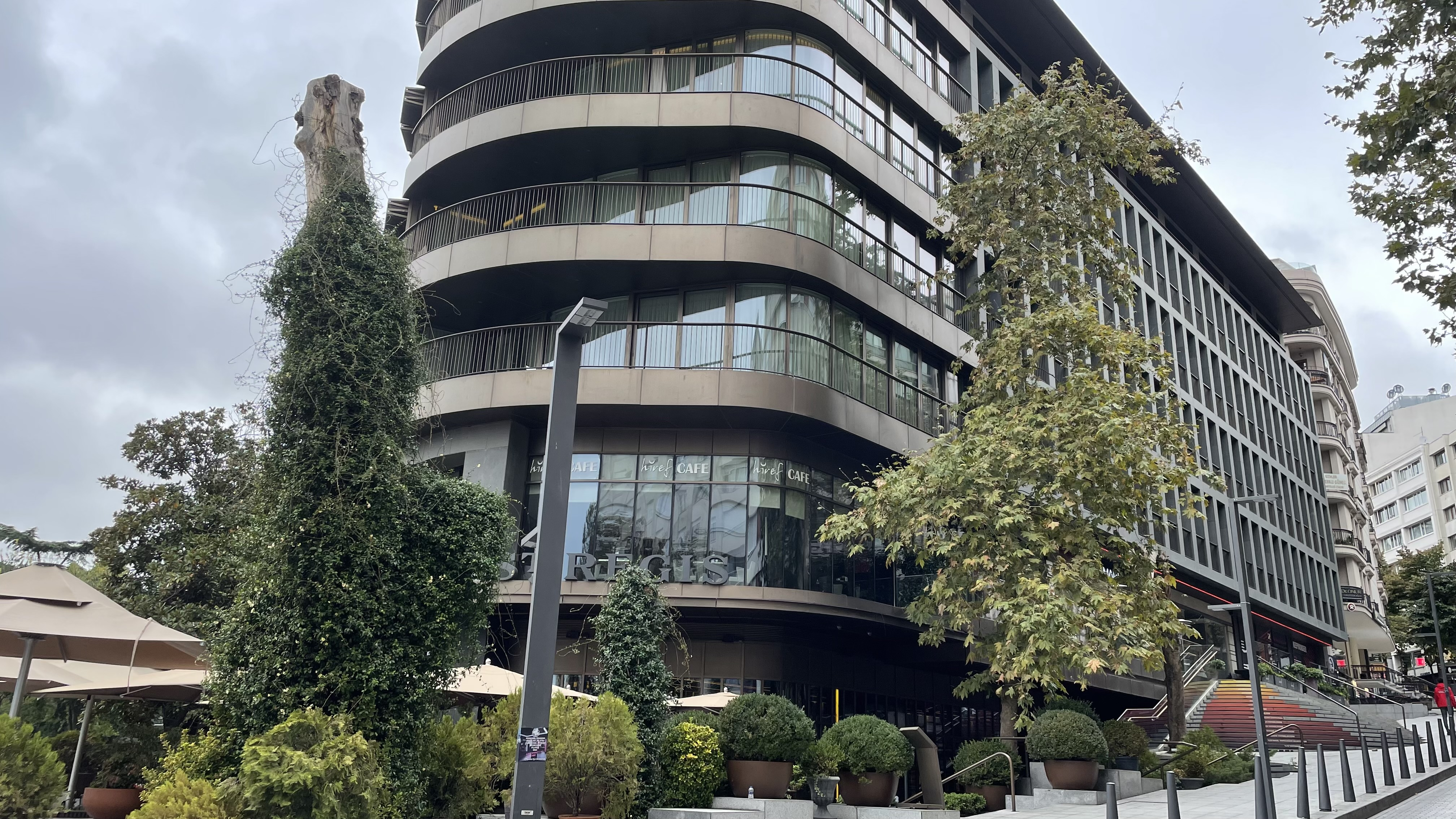
St. Regis Hotel in Teşvikiye, Nişantaşı.

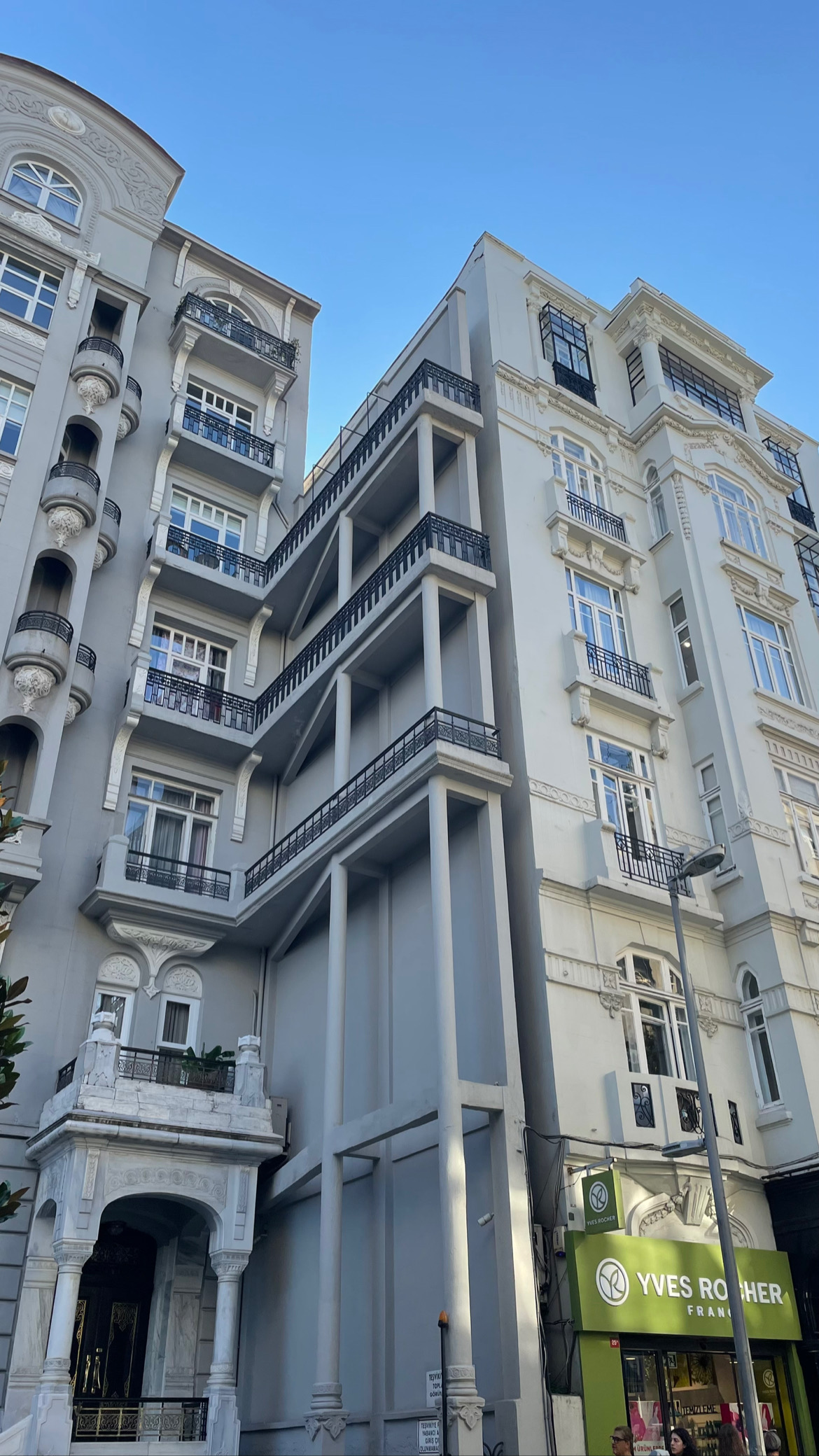
Buildings in Teşvikiye, Nişantaşı.

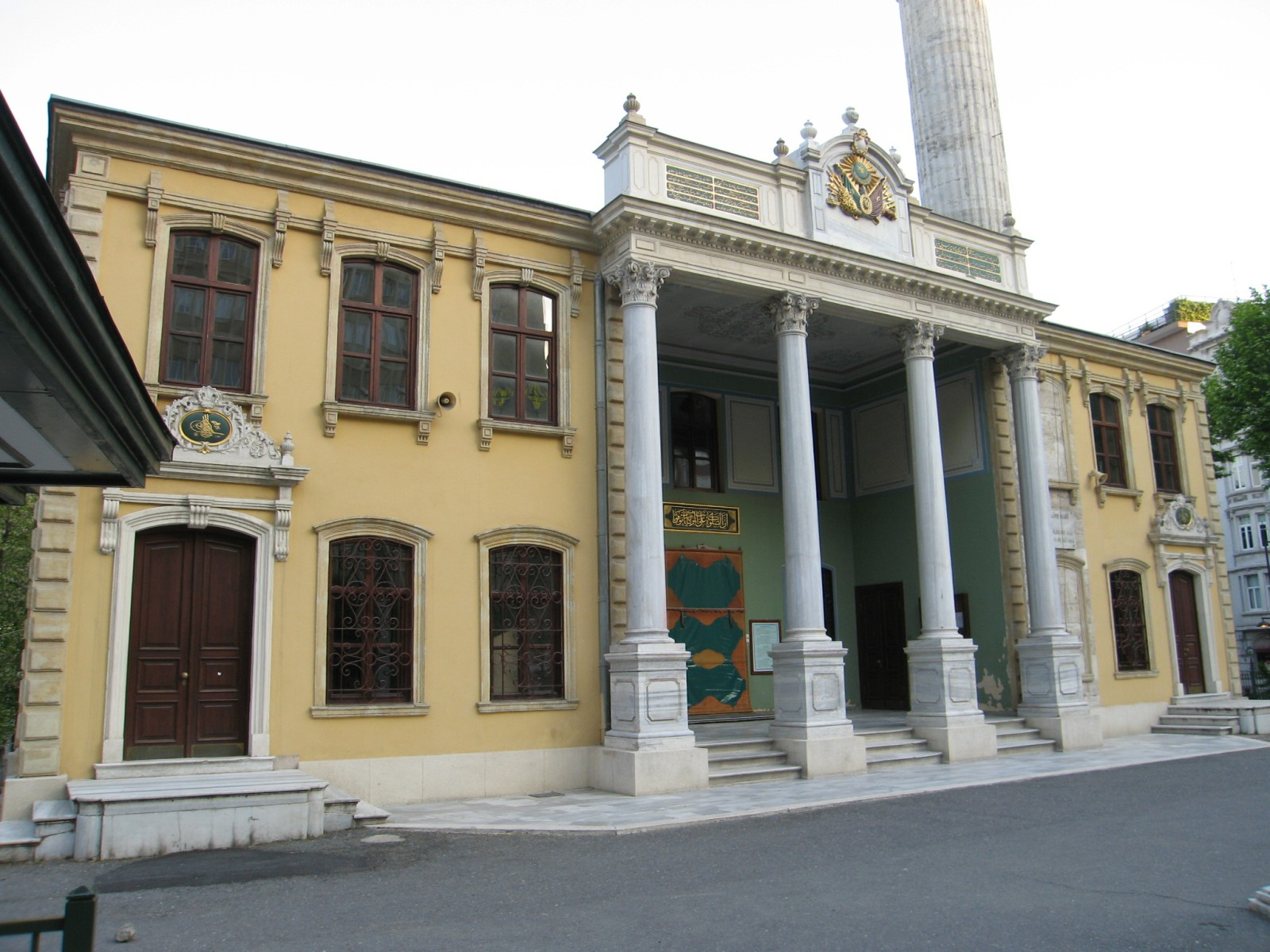
Teşvikiye Mosque in Teşvikiye, Nişantaşı.

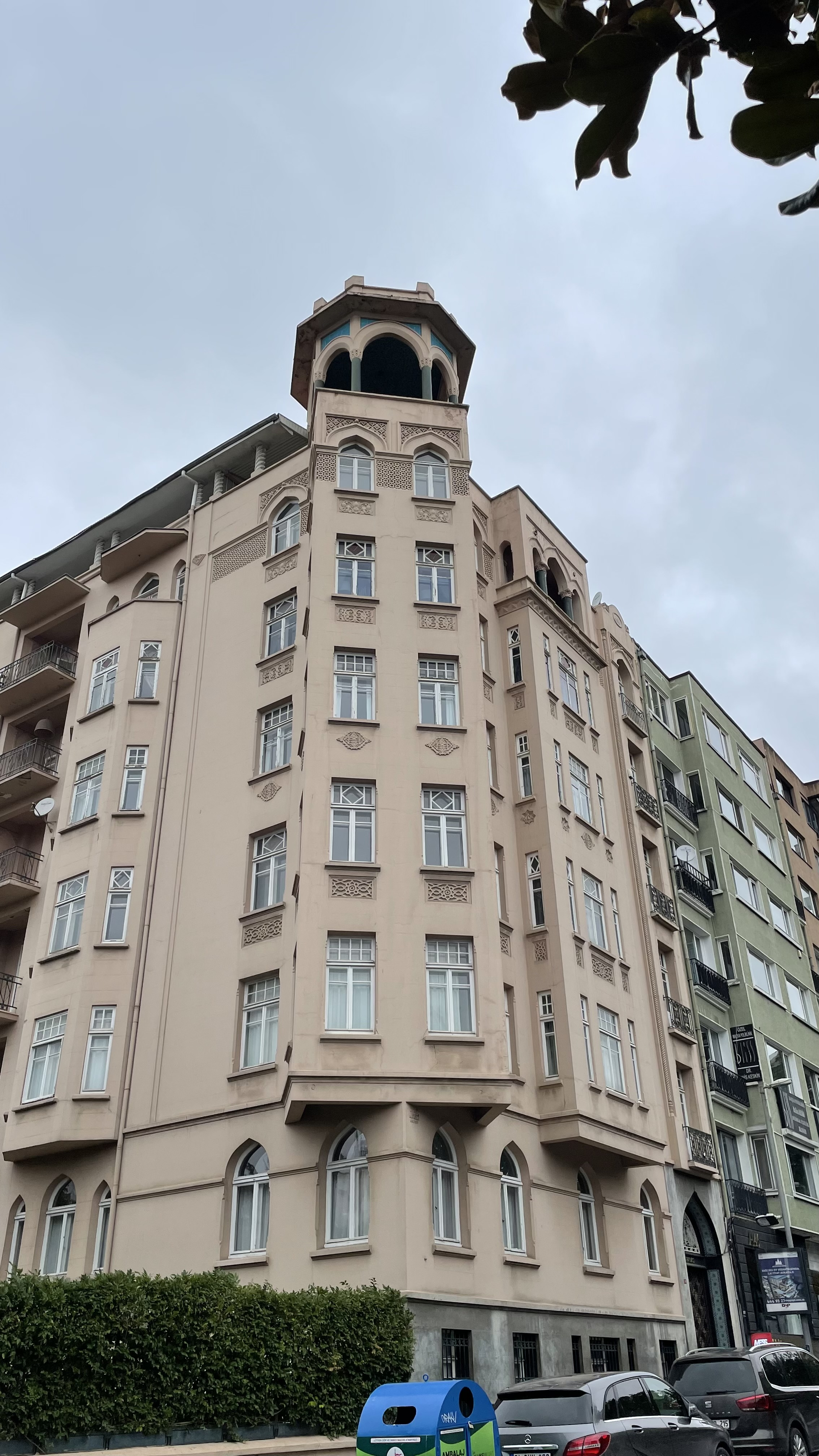
İzmir Palace in Nişantaşı.

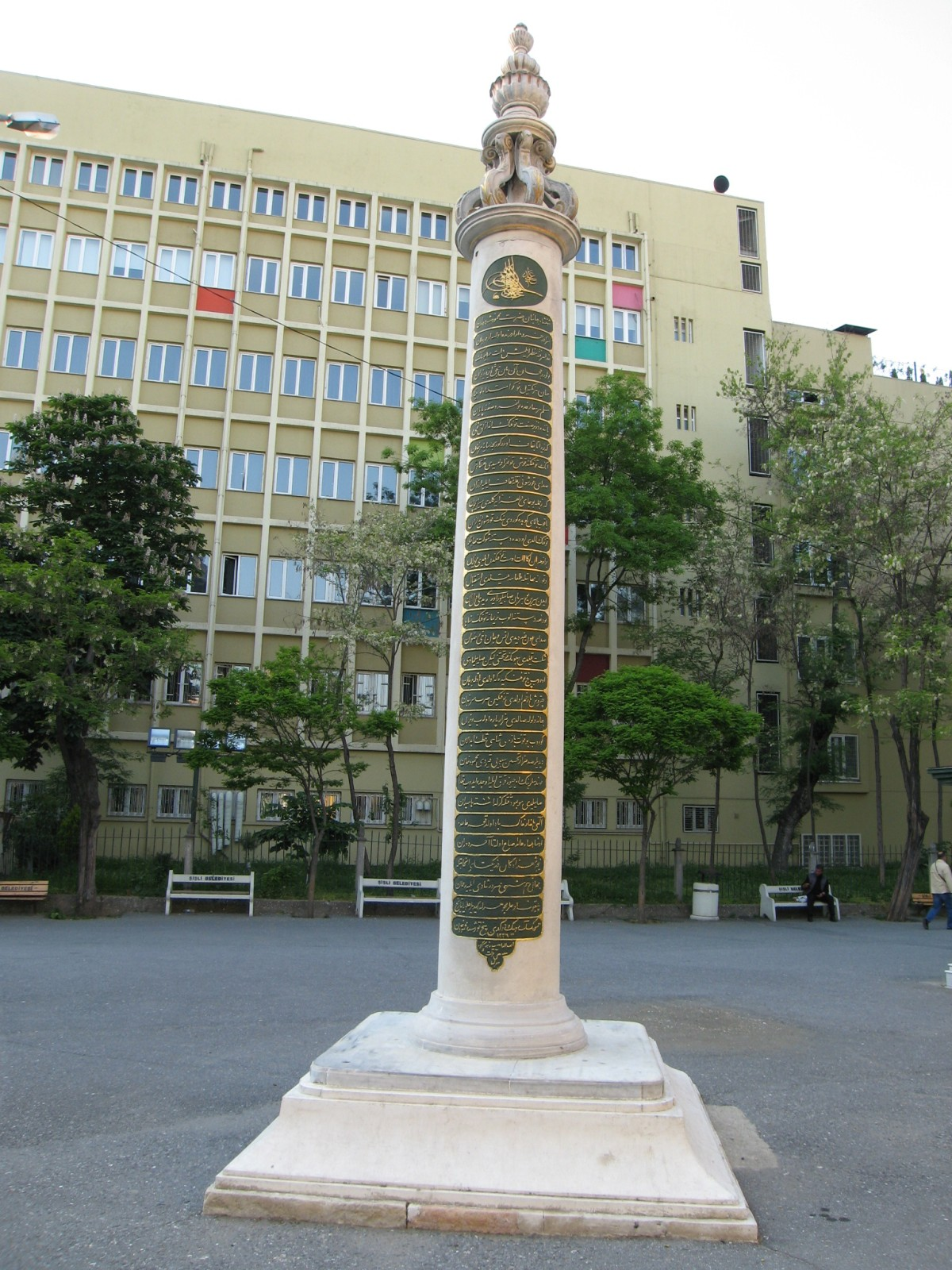
An "aiming stone" (nişan taşı) for archery, one of two inside the courtyard of Teşvikiye Mosque in Teşvikiye, Nişantaşı.

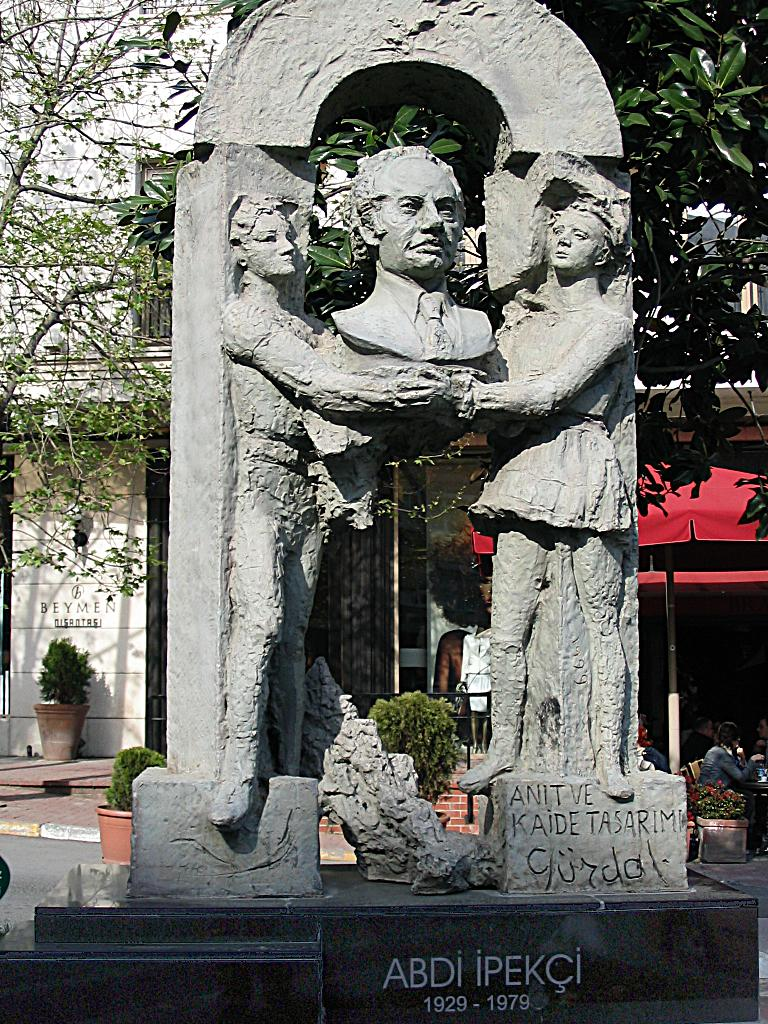
Abdi İpekçi monument in Nişantaşı.

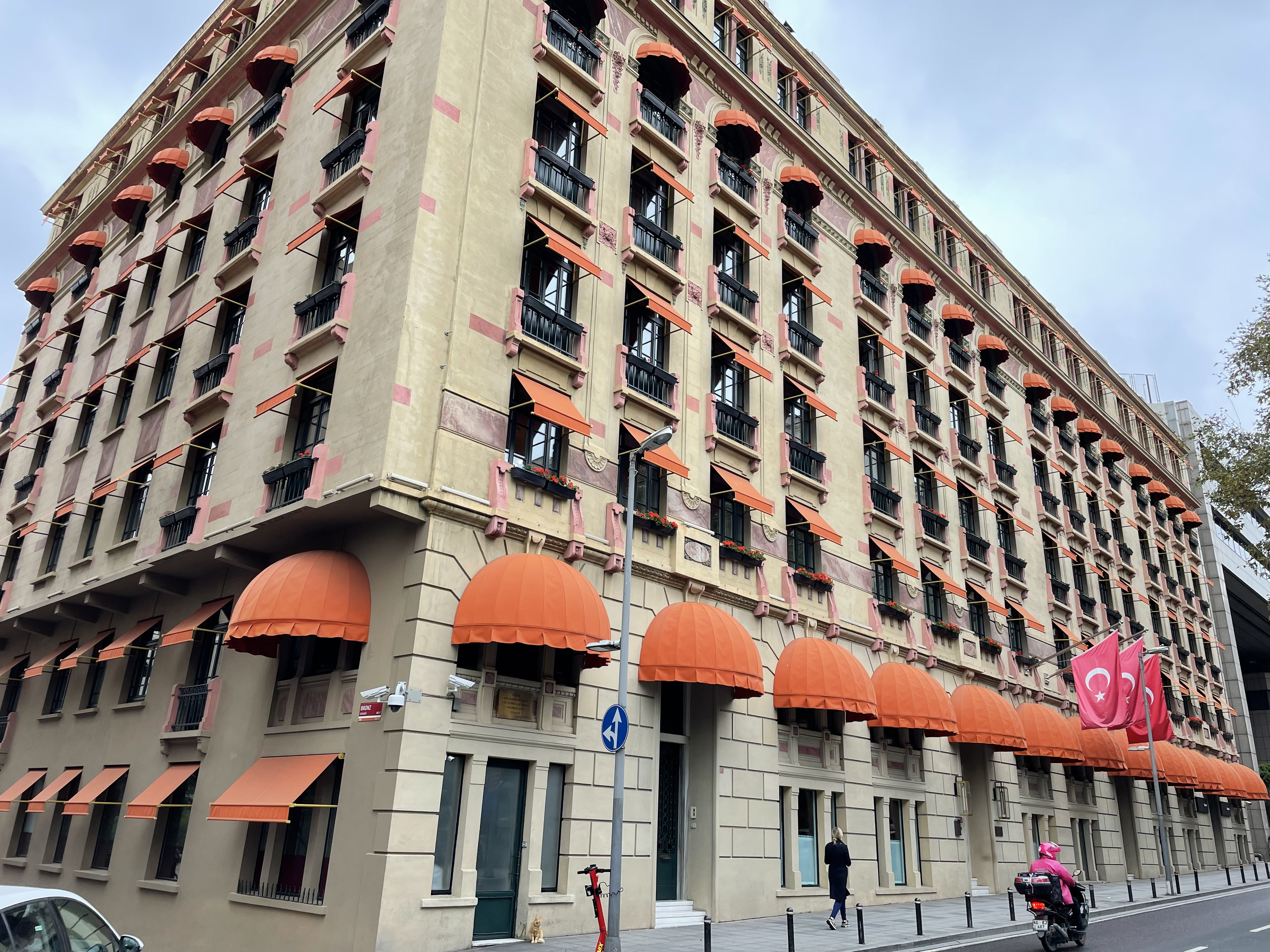
Park Hyatt Hotel, Maçka

== See also ==
- Beyoğlu
