= Maçka, Istanbul =

Neighborhood in Istanbul

Coordinates: 41.049°N 28.988°E

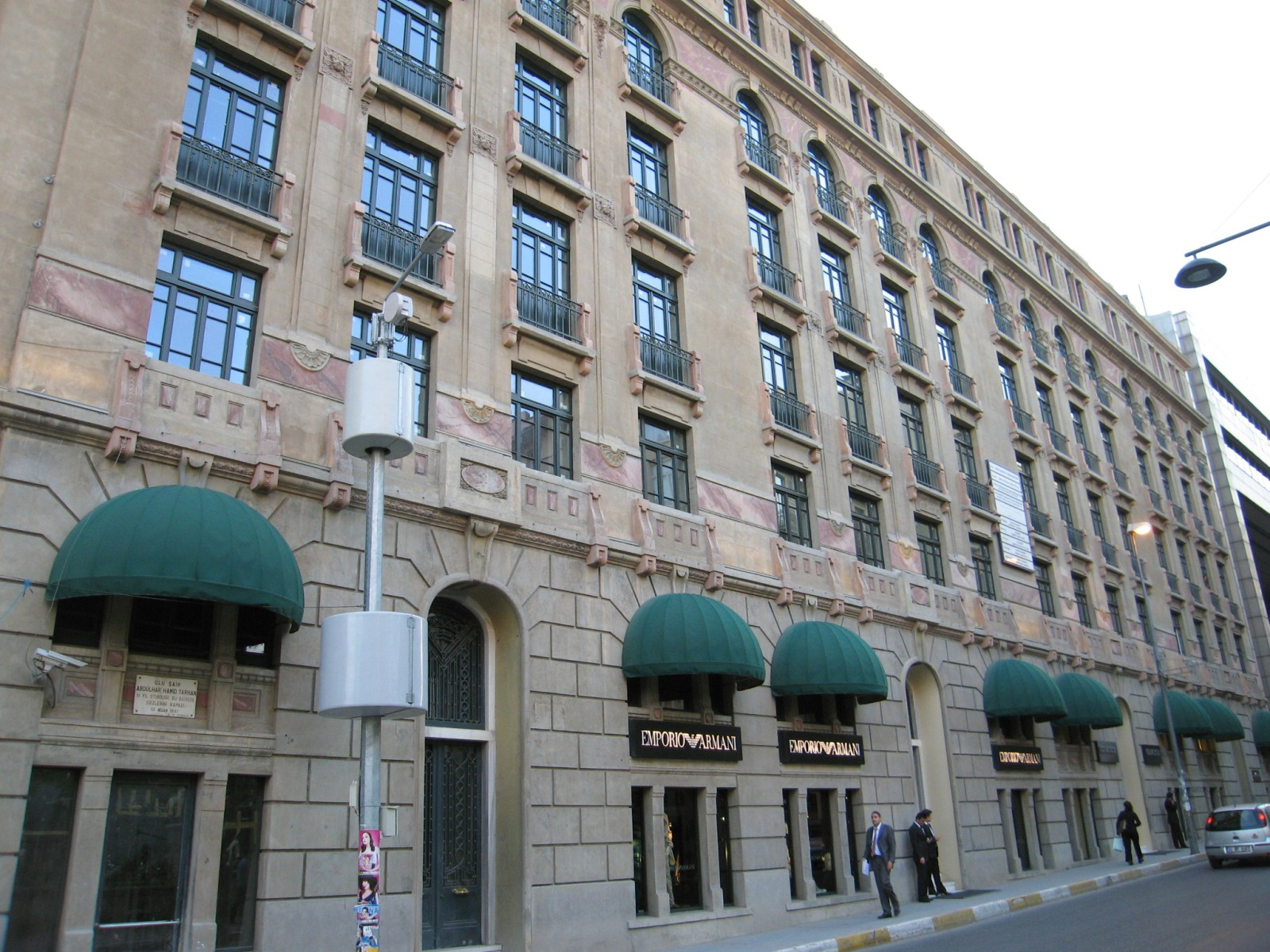
Maçka Palas (1922) designed by Giulio Mongeri houses the Emporio Armani, Armani Café and Gucci stores in the Nişantaşı quarter of Istanbul.

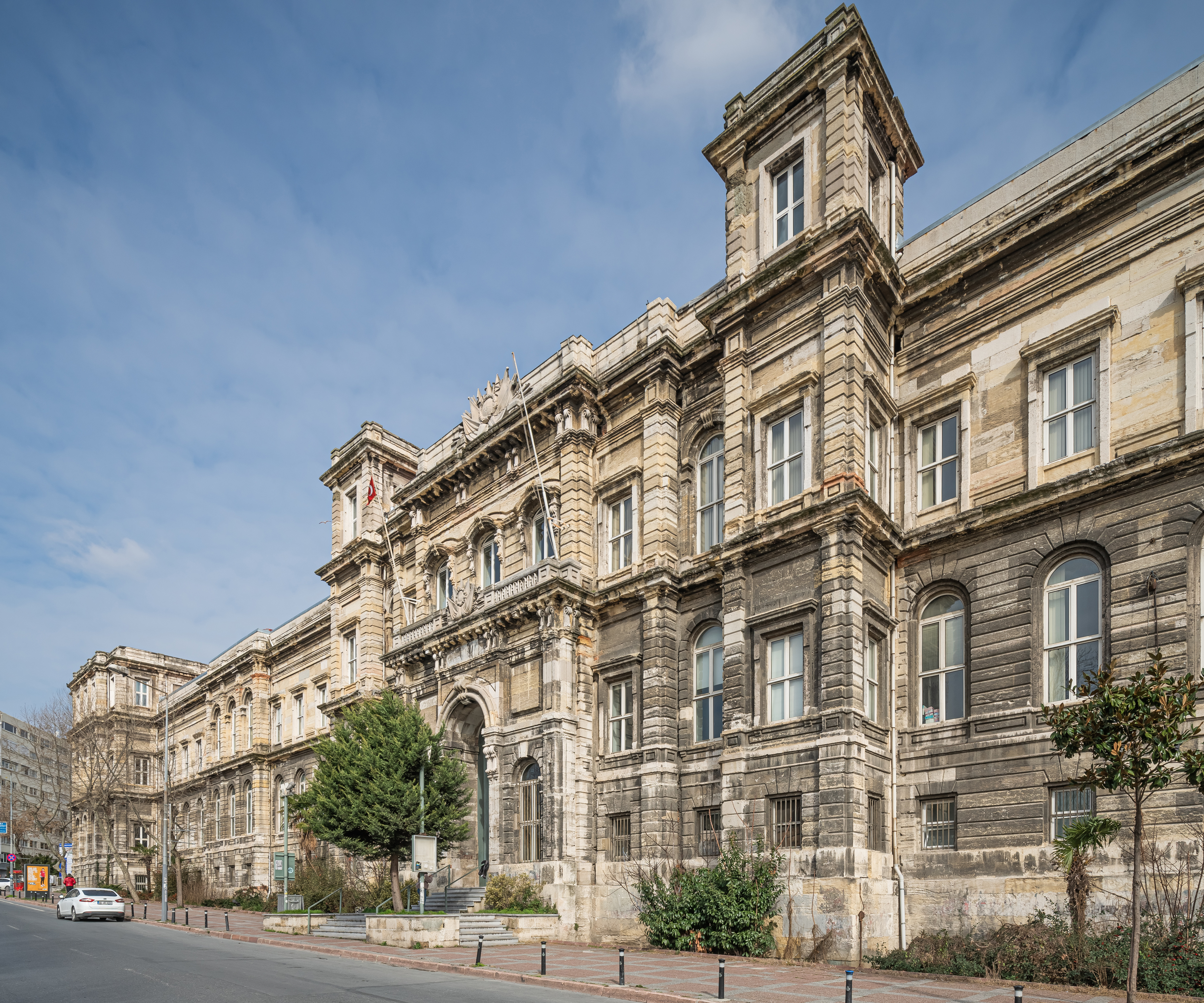
Maçka campus of Istanbul Technical University (ITU)

Maçka is one of the four neighbourhoods (together with Teşvikiye, Osmanbey and Pangaltı) within the Nişantaşı quarter of the Şişli district in Istanbul, Turkey.

One of the five campuses of the Istanbul Technical University, the Maçka Campus, is located in Maçka. The main building of ITU's Maçka Campus was originally built in 1834 (renovated in 1873) as the Maçka Barracks (Maçka Kışlası) of the Ottoman Army.

== Design ==
Maçka Palas (1922) designed by Giulio Mongeri in the style of Milanese palazzos houses the Emporio Armani, Armani Café and Gucci stores in the Nişantaşı quarter of Istanbul. Giulio Mongeri also designed the Italianate style Maçka Technical High School (Maçka Akif Tuncel Teknik ve Endüstri Meslek Lisesi) building right across Maçka Palas, which was originally constructed to become Italy's new embassy in Istanbul, but was granted to the Republic of Turkey after Ankara became the new Turkish capital in 1923; being used as a high school building ever since.

The two-station Maçka Gondola lift line Tf1 connects Maçka with Taşkışla close to Taksim Square over a 42 m (138 ft) deep green valley, in which the Maçka Democracy Park, an urban park, is located.

== See also ==
- Nişantaşı
