= Teşvikiye =

- Neighbourhood
- Location in Turkey Teşvikiye (Istanbul)
- Coordinates: 41°02′55″N 28°59′40″E
- Country: Turkey
- Province: Istanbul
- District: Şişli
- Population (2022): 11,274
- Time zone: UTC+3 (TRT)

Teşvikiye is a neighbourhood in the municipality and district of Şişli, Istanbul Province, Turkey. Its population is 11,274 (2022). It is one of the four neighbourhoods (together with Maçka, Osmanbey and Pangaltı) within the Nişantaşı quarter.

The neighborhood of Teşvikiye and its historical center near the well known Teşvikiye Mosque is a upscale area which has many cafes, stores, artwork exhibitions, and creative works of fashion.

The area is also home to many beautiful Art Nouveau style buildings built at around the years of 1900-1920.

== Gallery ==
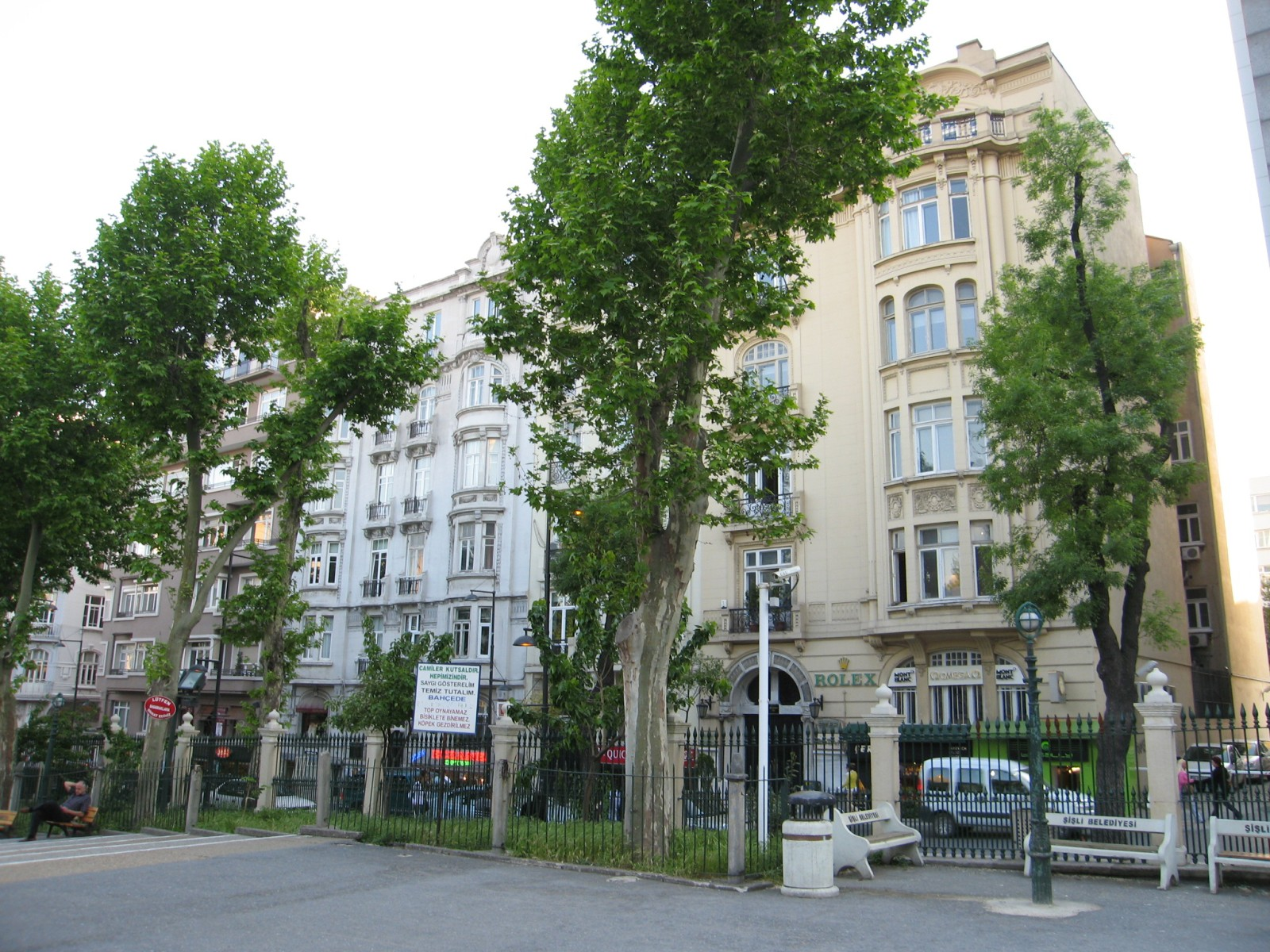
Art Nouveau style apartment buildings

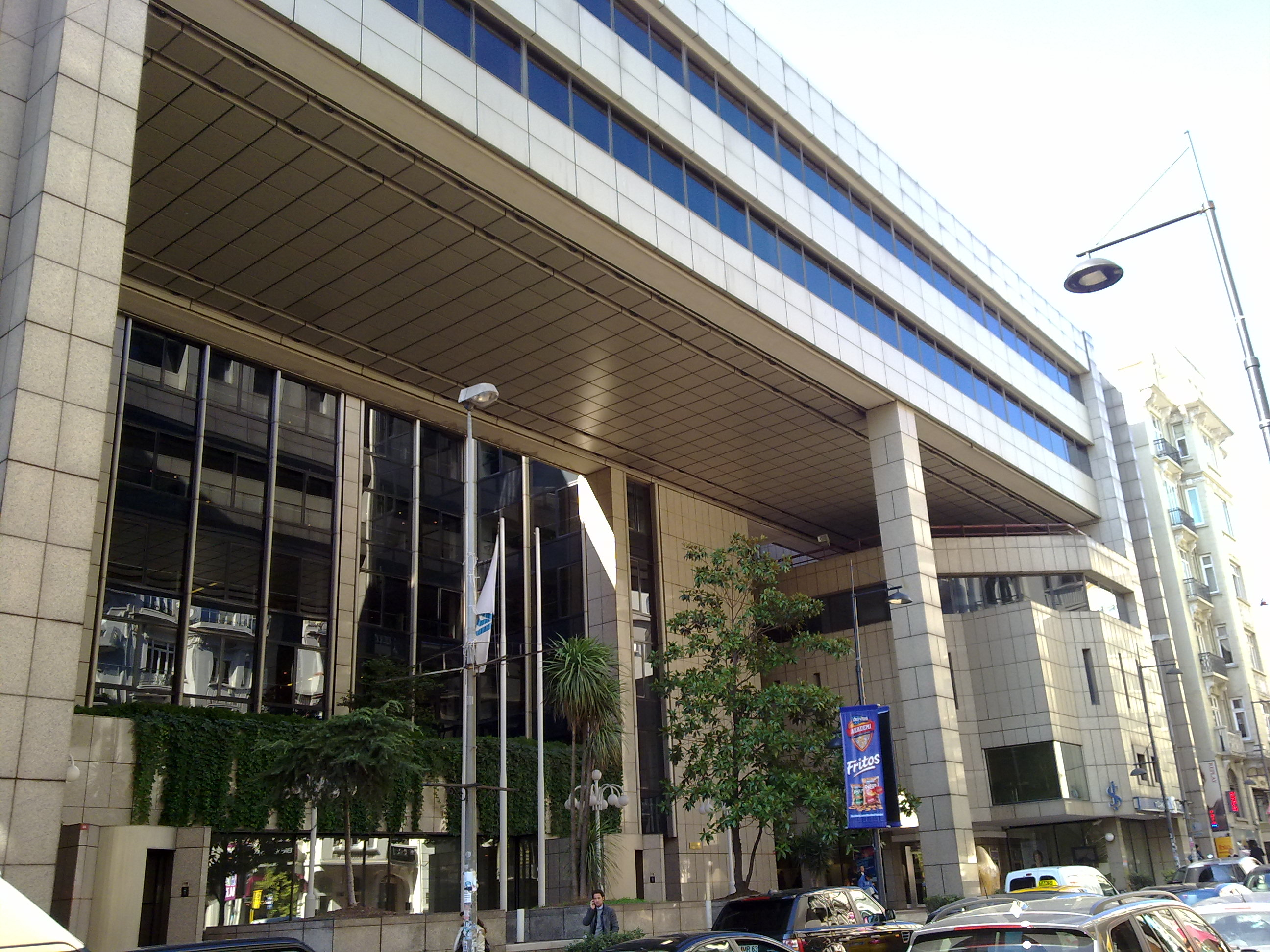
Millî Reasürans (National Reinsurance) building

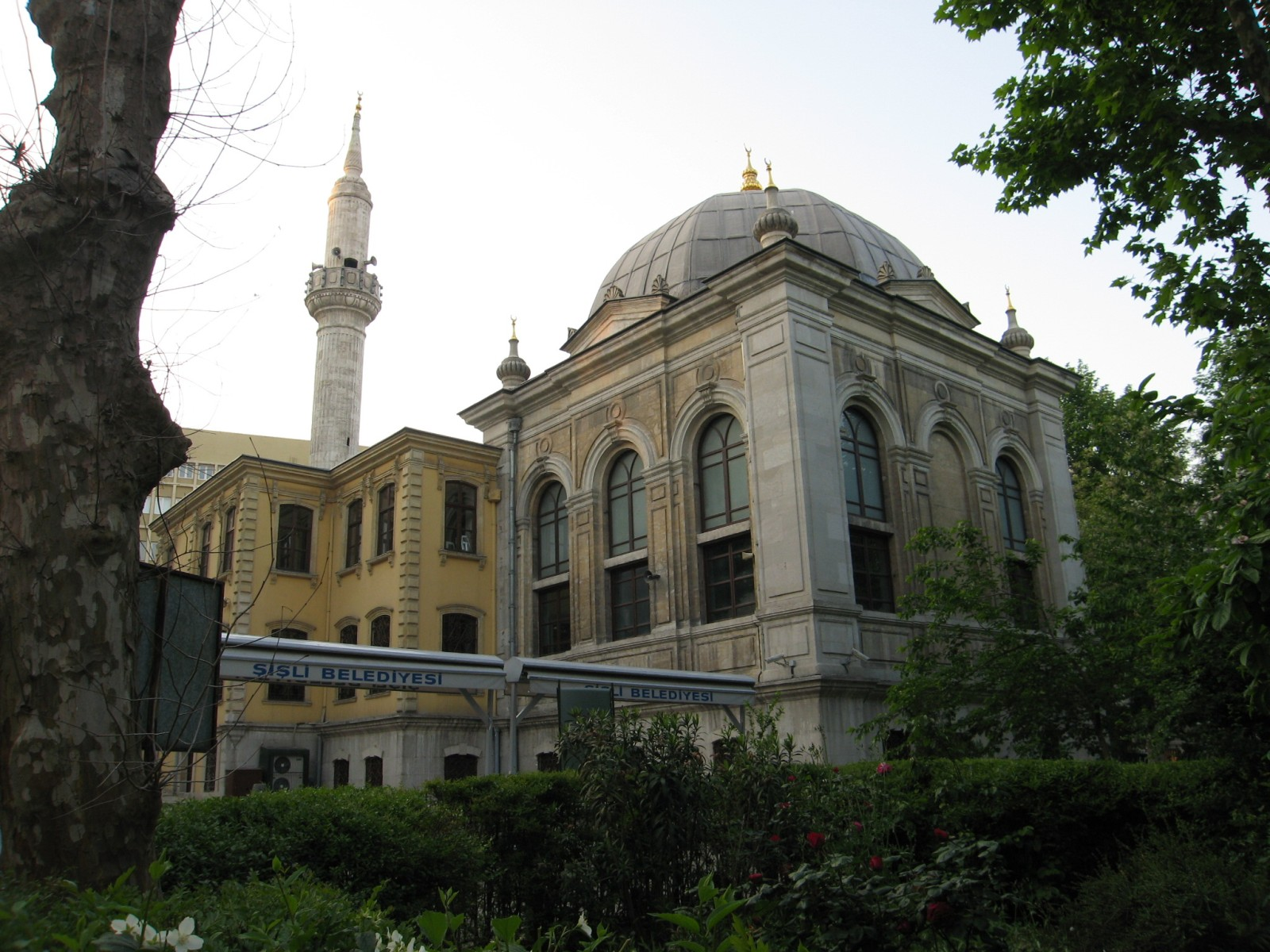
Teşvikiye Mosque

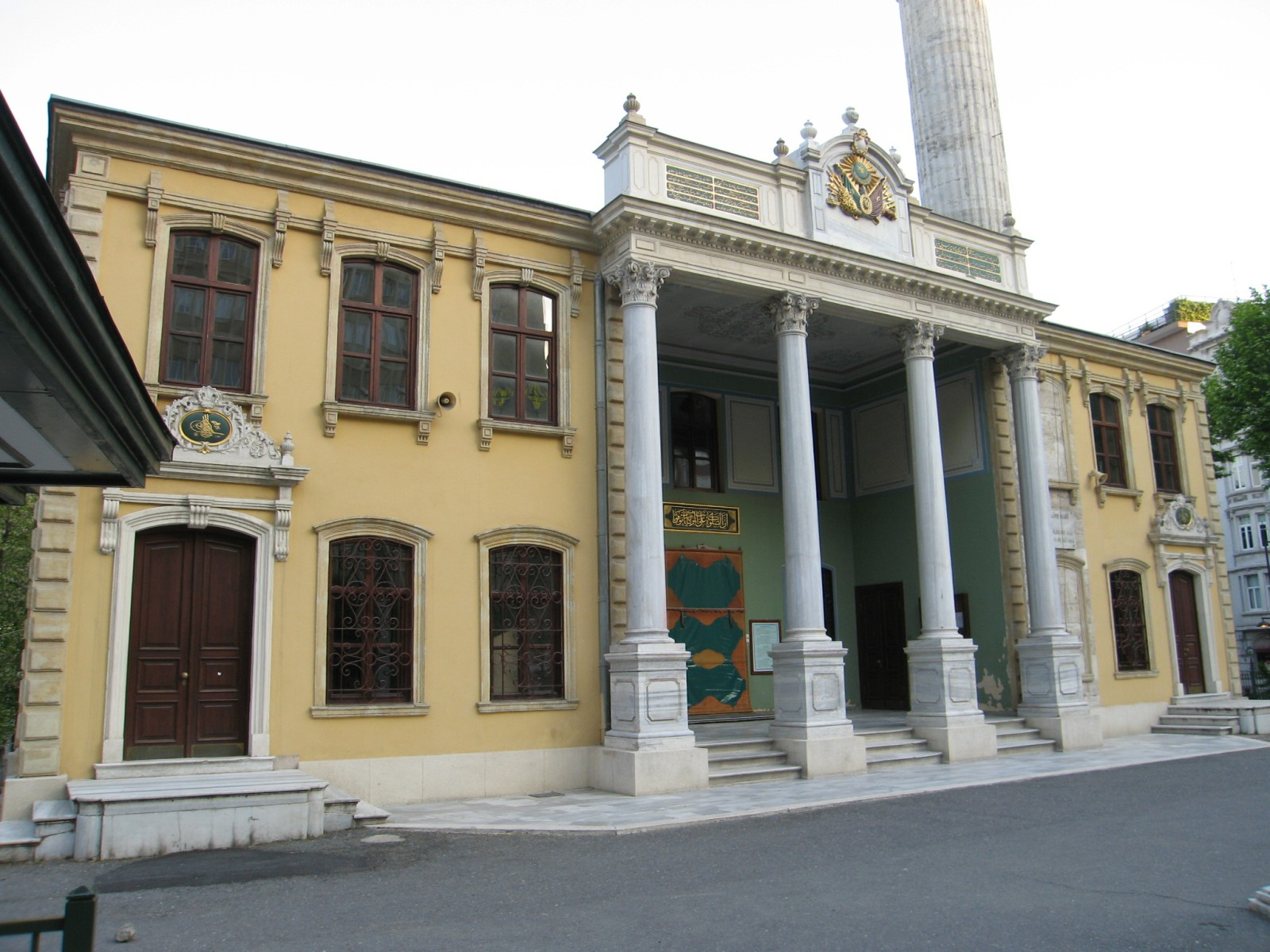
Teşvikiye Mosque

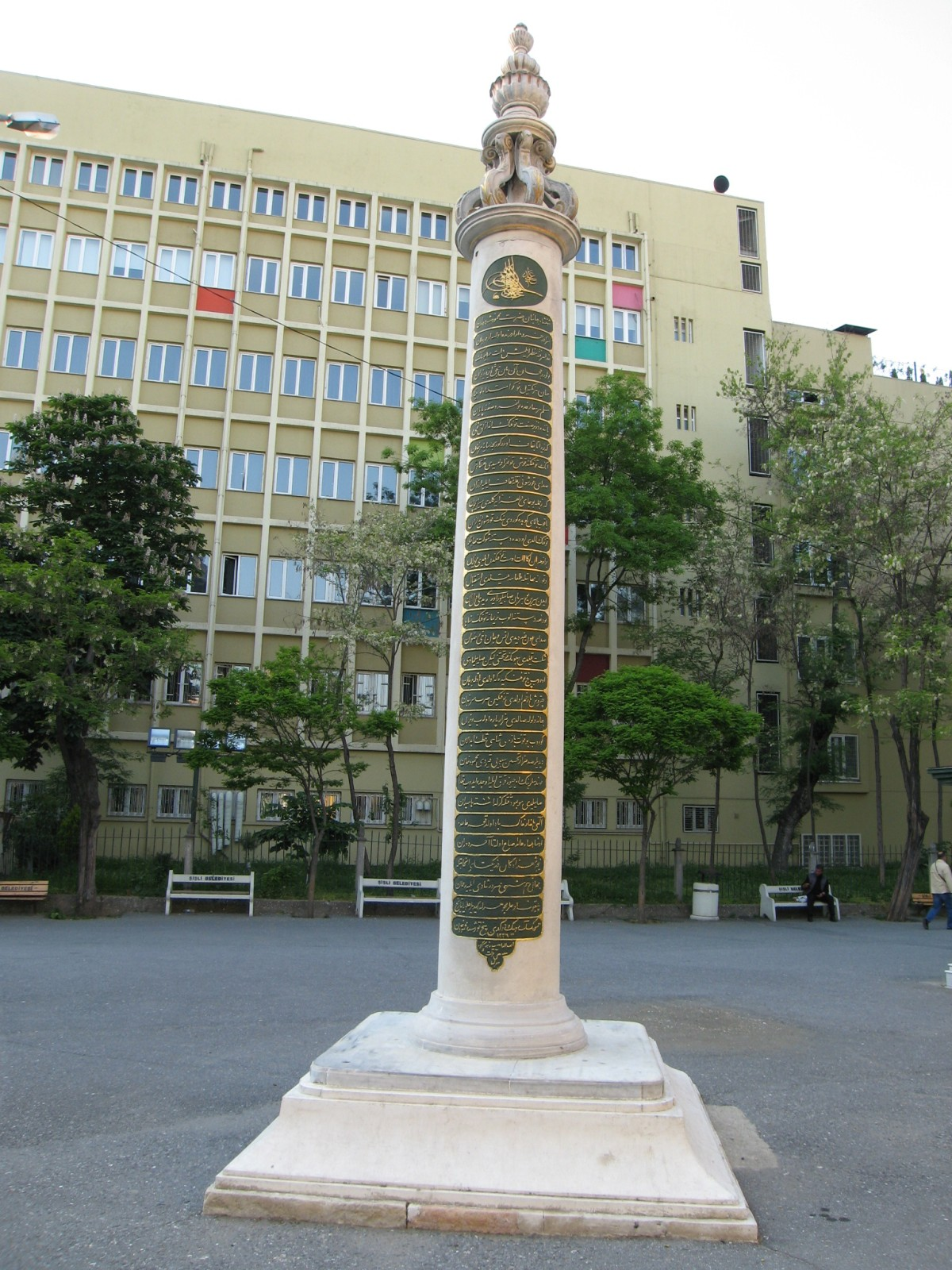
One of the two archery stones in the courtyard of Teşvikiye Mosque
