= Teşvikiye Mosque =

Neo-baroque mosque in Istanbul, Turkey

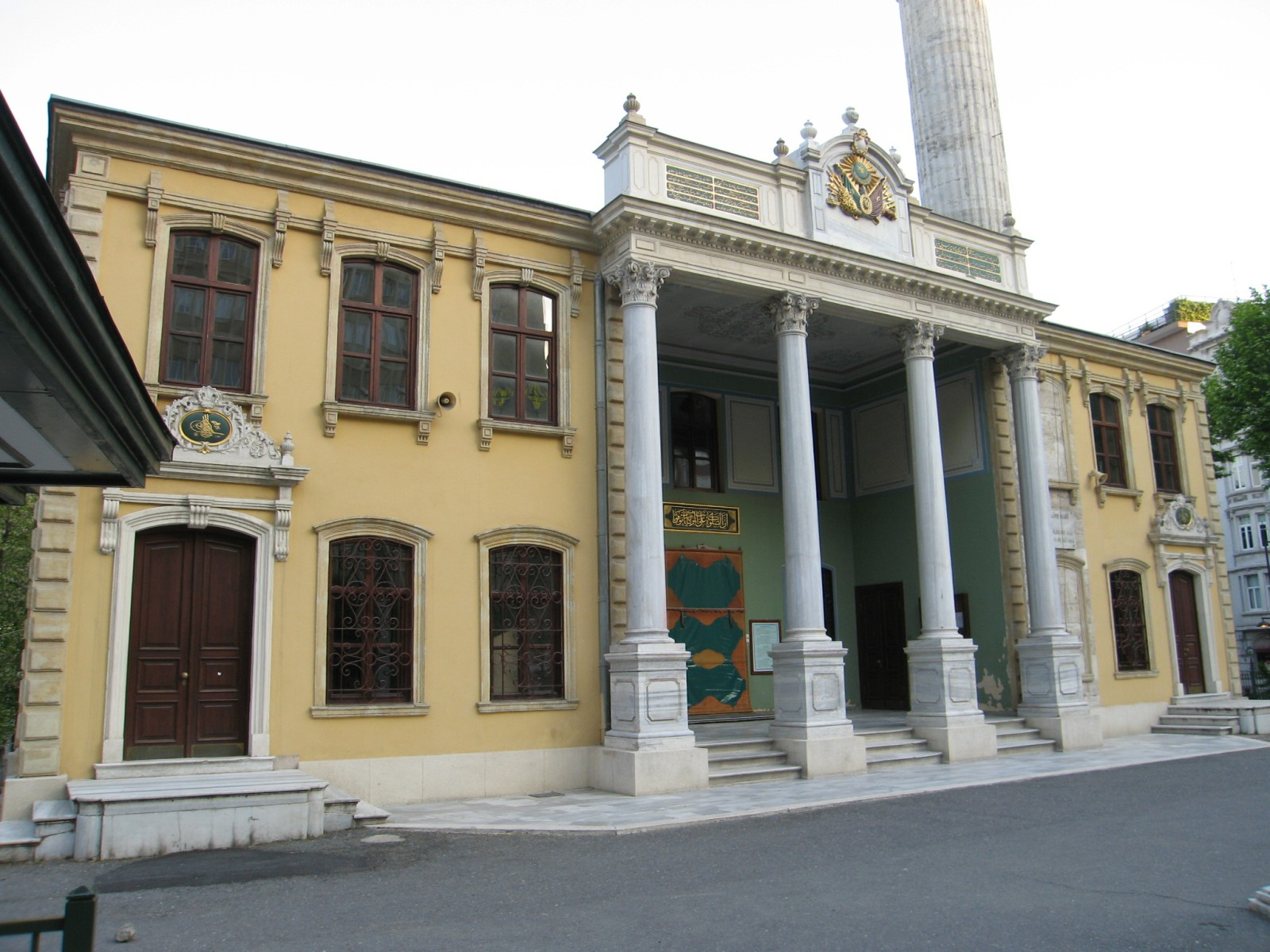
- Teşvikiye Mosque in 2008

Religion
- Affiliation: Islam

Location
- Location: Istanbul, Turkey
- Interactive map of Teşvikiye Mosque
- Coordinates: 41°02′58″N 28°59′39″E

Architecture
- Type: Mosque
- Style: Islamic, Ottoman architecture, Neo-Baroque
- Completed: 1854
- Minaret: 1

The Teşvikiye Mosque (Turkish: Teşvikiye Camii) is a neo-baroque structure located in the Teşvikiye neighbourhood of Şişli district in Istanbul, Turkey.

== History ==
The mosque was originally commissioned in 1794 by Sultan Selim III, but most of the current mosque that stands today was completed in 1854 during the reign of Sultan Abdülmecit I. It was designed by Krikor Balyan, of the famed family of Armenian architects. It was constructed during a time when several well-known structures in Istanbul were being built or renovated, including the Ortaköy Mosque and Dolmabahçe Palace, in styles imported from Europe. Its front facade, constructed during a renovation in the late 19th century, gives it a unique appearance, with huge white columns. It has become a sort of stand-out symbol in the upscale, bustling quarter of Nişantaşı. It is also often used as the starting point of funerals for famous and public figures.

The mosque was closed for renovations in 2018, with it reopening in April 2021.

The novelist Orhan Pamuk mentions the mosque in one of his memoirs.

== Gallery ==
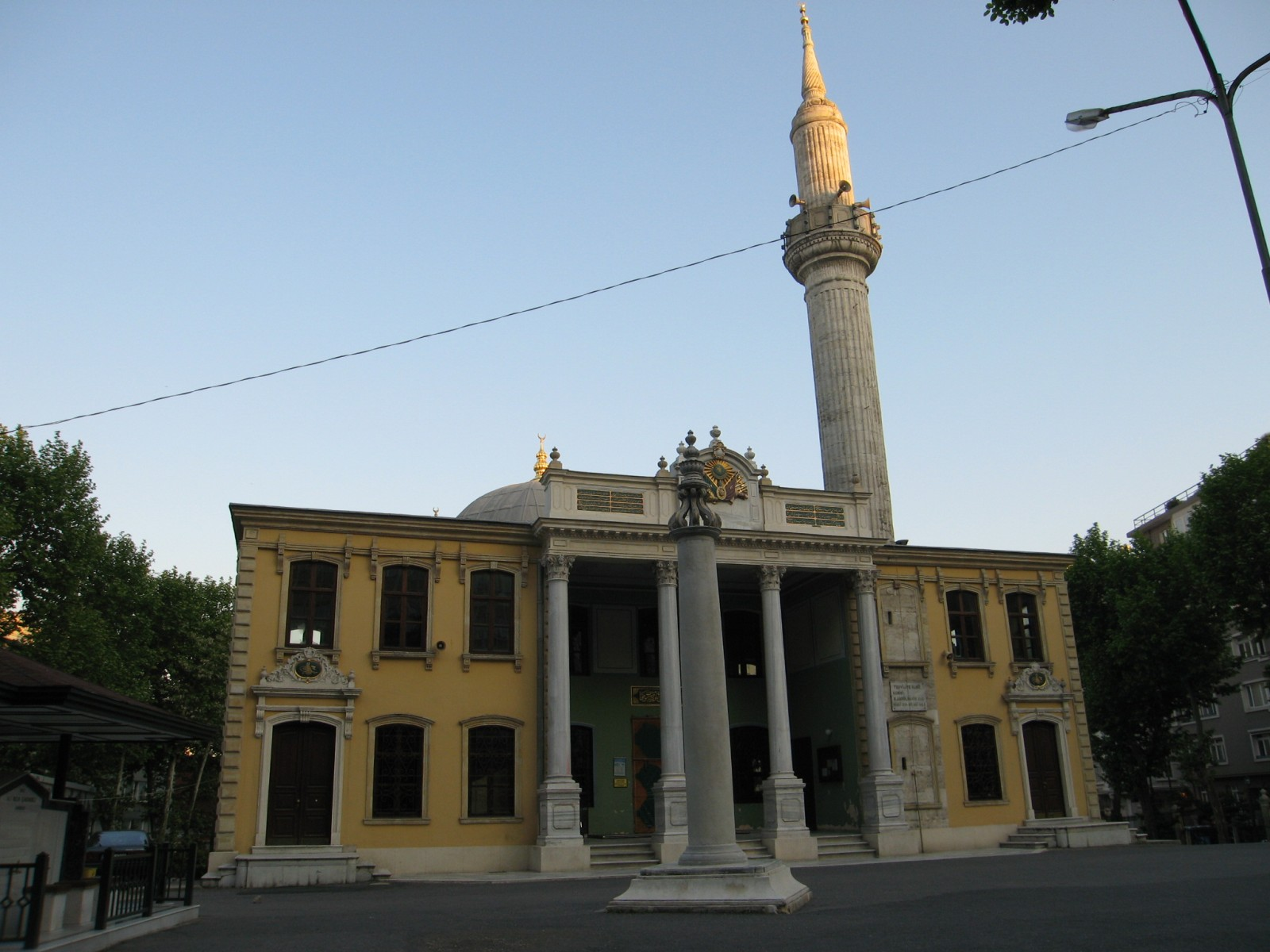
Teşvikiye Mosque, 2008.

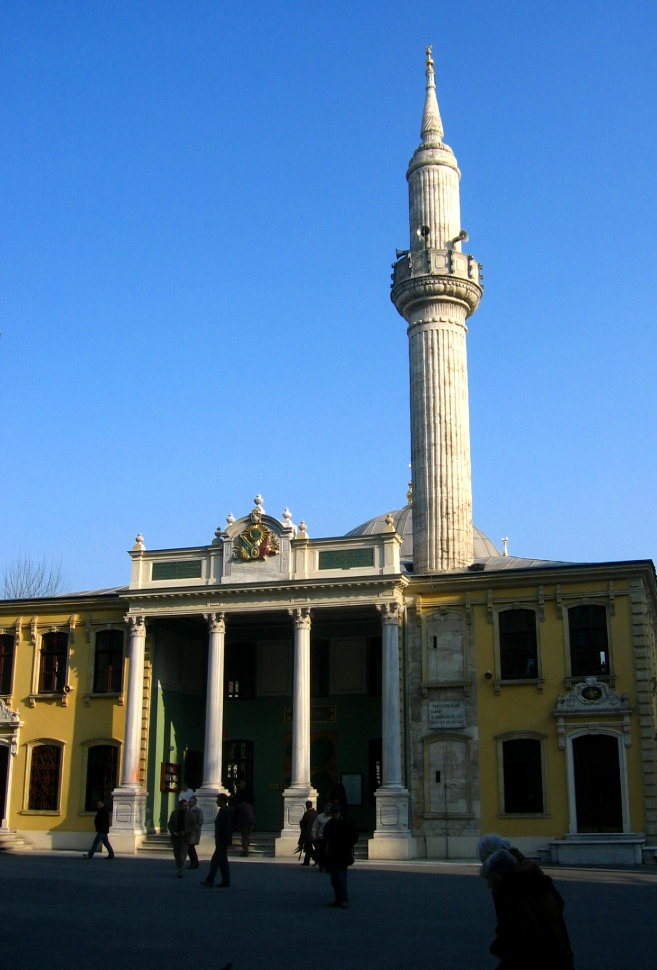
