= Osmanbey =

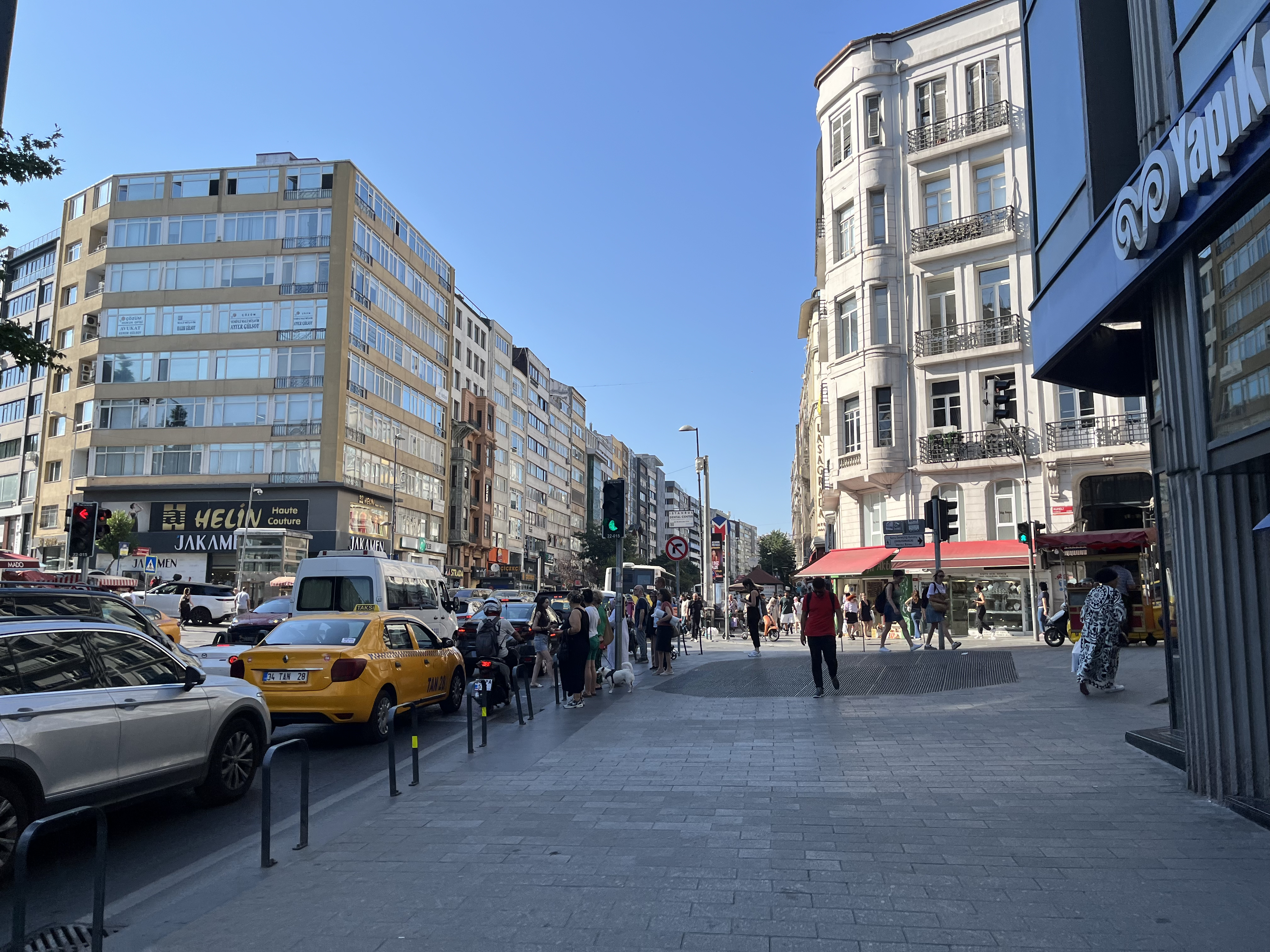

- Location of Şişli in Istanbul
- Coordinates: 41°03′5.94″N 28°59′15.24″E
- Country: Turkey
- Province: Istanbul
- District: Şişli
- Time zone: GMT +2
- Area code: (+90) 212

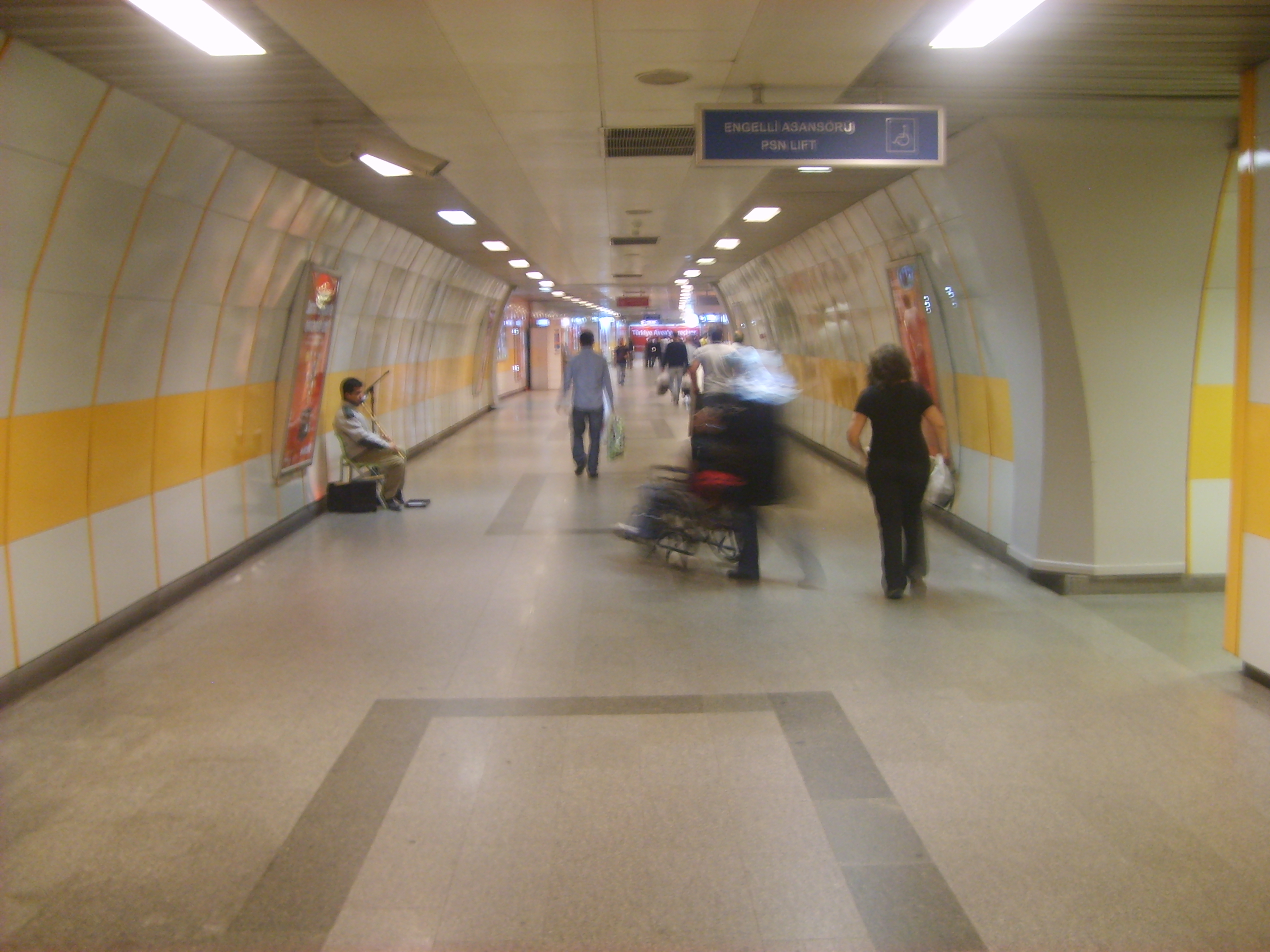
Inside of Osmanbey station of the Istanbul Metro

Osmanbey is one of the four neighbourhoods (together with Teşvikiye, Maçka and Pangaltı) within the Nişantaşı quarter of the Şişli district in Istanbul, Turkey. It is served by the Osmanbey metro station. Osmanbey is home to the Beth Israel Synagogue built in 1940. The Turkish-Armenian journalist Hrant Dink was murdered outside the office of Agos Newspaper in Osmanbey in 2007.
