= 2006 Nobel Prize in Literature =

- Orhan Pamuk
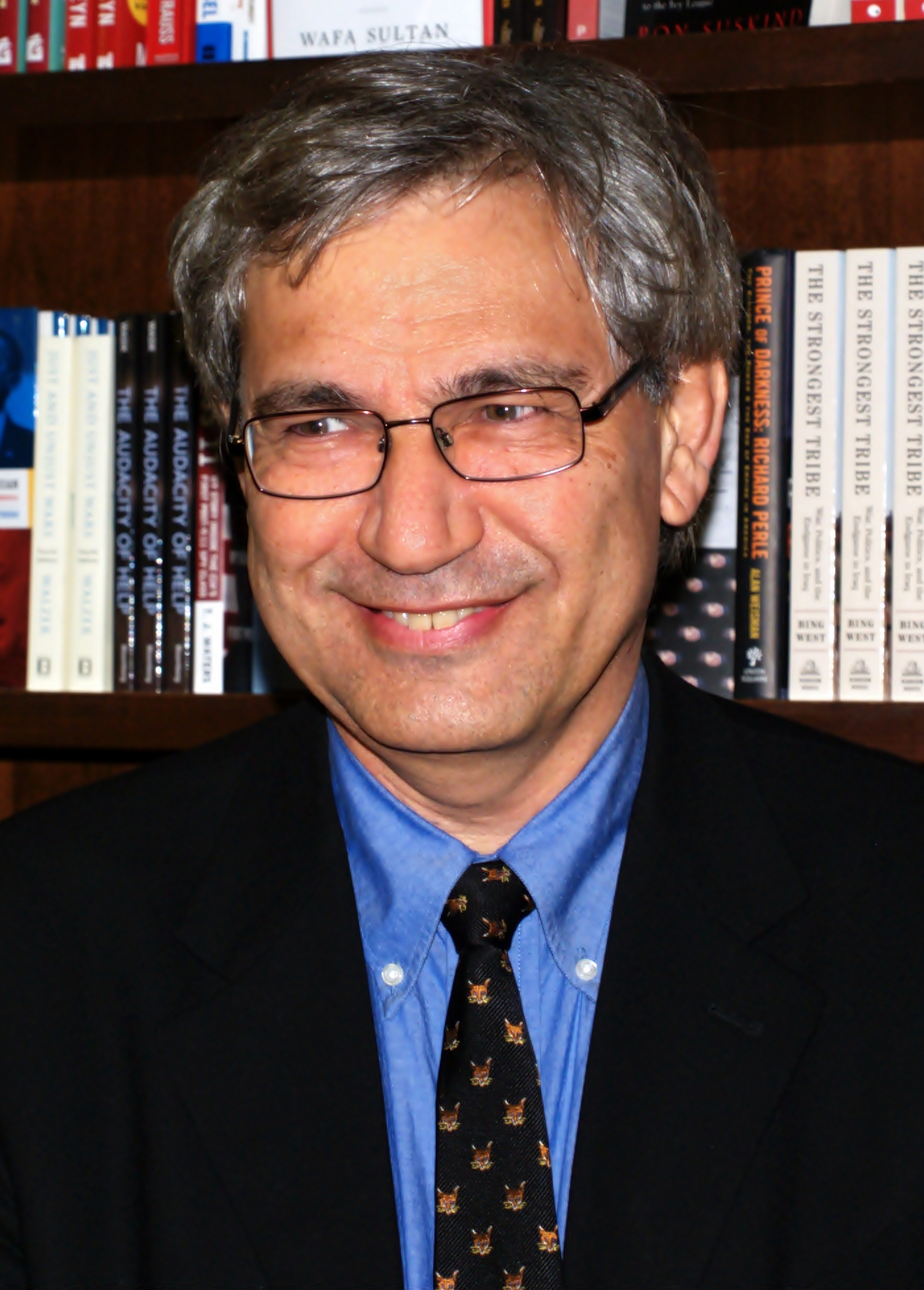
- "who in the quest for the melancholic soul of his native city has discovered new symbols for the clash and interlacing of cultures."
- Date: 12 October 2006 (announcement); 10 December 2006 (ceremony)
- Location: Stockholm, Sweden
- Presented by: Swedish Academy
- First award: 1901
- Website: Official website

The 2006 Nobel Prize in Literature was awarded to the Turkish writer Orhan Pamuk (born 1952) "who in the quest for the melancholic soul of his native city has discovered new symbols for the clash and interlacing of cultures."

== Laureate ==
Orhan Pamuk, a leading novelist in Turkey, made his literary debut with the novel Cevdet Bey ve Oğulları (Cevdet Bey and His Sons, 1982), a novel with measured and meticulous prose, set in the backdrop of the last days of an empire and then the slow and troubled rise of a young republic, spanning three generations of a large family and their social connections. His international breakthrough came later and was firmly established with Benim Adım Kırmızı ("My Name is Red", 1998) and Kar ("Snow", 2002). Pamuk's novels are characterized by the search for identity in the borderland between Western and Eastern values, an attempt to understand differences and similarities and an ambivalent yearning for both modern and old traditions. Among his other famous works include Sessiz Ev ("Silent House", 1983) and Masumiyet Müzesi ("The Museum of Innocence", 2008).

== Ladbrokes favourites ==
On Ladbrokes, the Syrian poet Adunis and Orhan Pamuk were the favorites tipped to win the 2006 Nobel Prize in Literature, followed by American novelist Joyce Carol Oates, French writer Jean-Marie Gustave Le Clézio (awarded in 2008), Japanese novelist Haruki Murakami, Swedish poet Tomas Tranströmer (awarded in 2011), Danish poet Inger Christensen, Israeli writer Amos Oz, South Korean poet Ko Un, American author Philip Roth and Polish journalist Ryszard Kapuscinski.

== Reactions ==
When the Swedish Academy announced that he had been awarded the 2006 Nobel Prize, it confounded pundits and oddsmakers who had concluded that Syrian poet Ali Ahmad Said, better known as Adunis, was most likely to receive that year's award. There were concerns within Turkey that the decision to award the Nobel Prize to Pamuk was politically motivated. In its citation, the academy said: "In the quest for the melancholic soul of his native city, [Pamuk] has discovered new symbols for the clash and interlacing of cultures."

The choice of Pamuk was generally well received. "It would be difficult to conceive of a more perfect winner for our catastrophic times.", said Margaret Atwood, "Pamuk gives us what all novelists give us at their best: the truth. Not the truth of statistics, but the truth of human experience at a particular place, in a particular time. And as with all great literature, you feel at moments not that you are examining him, but that he is examining you." In his native Turkey reactions were mixed. Leading newspapers took a political stance and questioned Pamuk's Turkishness. The best reaction to Pamuk's victory was pride, wrote the editor of the pro-government Daily Sabah, but "we can't quite see Pamuk as 'one of us'... We see him as someone who 'sells us out' and ... can't even stand behind what he says."

== Nobel lecture ==
Pamuk held his Nobel Lecture on 7 December 2006 at the Swedish Academy, Stockholm. The lecture was entitled "Babamın Bavulu" ("My Father's Suitcase") and was given in Turkish. In the lecture he allegorically spoke of relations between Eastern and Western civilizations using the theme of his relationship with his father.

What literature needs most to tell and investigate today are humanity's basic fears: the fear of being left outside, and the fear of counting for nothing, and the feelings of worthlessness that come with such fears; the collective humiliations, vulnerabilities, slights, grievances, sensitivities, and imagined insults, and the nationalist boasts and inflations that are their next of kin ... Whenever I am confronted by such sentiments, and by the irrational, overstated language in which they are usually expressed, I know they touch on a darkness inside me. We have often witnessed peoples, societies and nations outside the Western world–and I can identify with them easily—succumbing to fears that sometimes lead them to commit stupidities, all because of their fears of humiliation and their sensitivities. I also know that in the West—a world with which I can identify with the same ease–nations and peoples taking an excessive pride in their wealth, and in their having brought us the Renaissance, the Enlightenment, and Modernism, have, from time to time, succumbed to a self-satisfaction that is almost as stupid.

— Orhan Pamuk, Nobel Lecture (translation by Maureen Freely)

Pamuk's books broke a record and sold over 200,000 copies after the announcement of his success, leading to him becoming Turkey's best-selling recipient of the Nobel Prize in Literature.
