= The New Life (Pamuk novel) =

1994 novel by Orhan Pamuk

- First Turkish edition
- Author: Orhan Pamuk
- Original title: Yeni Hayat
- Translator: Güneli Gün
- Language: Turkish
- Publisher: İletişim Yayınları, Farrar, Straus and Giroux
- Publication date: 1994
- Publication place: Turkey
- English publication date: 1997
- Pages: 296
- ISBN: 978-0-374-22129-4
- OCLC: 35657984
- Dewey Decimal: 894/.3533 20
- LC Class: PL248.P34 Y4613 1997
- Preceded by: The Black Book
- Followed by: My Name Is Red

The New Life (Turkish: Yeni Hayat) is a 1994 novel by Turkish writer Orhan Pamuk, translated into English by Güneli Gün in 1997.

The plot centers around a young engineering student in Istanbul who discovers a "new life" in the pages of a book of the same name. The protagonist finds a number of other readers who have become similarly consumed as well as a few people who seek to destroy the book because of the effect it has on its followers. No passages from the book are revealed, and readers of the novel are left to hypothesize about its nature through the actions of the main character and other obsessed readers.

Pamuk started writing the novel when suffering from insomnia caused by a jet lag after a long plane journey. The title of the book was appropriated from Dante Alighieri's work The New Life.

== Plot ==
The protagonist, Osman, first notices the book in the university canteen when a female student, Janan, sets a copy down for a moment on his table. He later buys his own copy at a bookstall and is so thrilled by this novel that he sets off in search of the new life it promises. Janan introduces Osman to her lover Mehmet who had also read the book and been to the world it describes. Osman, who at this point is enchanted by Janan, witnesses Mehmet gunned down at a bus stop, but the injured man mysteriously disappears and can't be traced at any hospital. The two embark on surreal bus journeys in search of Mehmet. One of the buses has a road accident which results in fatalities. However, they emerge alive, expropriating the wallets and identities of two dead passengers. They continue the journey and encounter Dr. Fine, Mehmet's father. It turns out that he had sent spies to keep watch on his rebellious son and to murder other readers of the book. Janan herself vanishes and Osman goes on more surreal and violent bus journeys. It later appears that a deceased friend of Osman's father, Uncle Rifki, may actually be the author of the book.

== Reception ==
The novel was met with negative feedback from reviewers and readers alike, with many finding it incomprehensible. Following the release of the English version, D. M. Thomas gave the novel a mixed review in The New York Times and Gabriel Josipovici in his negative review for The Independent called the book "unreadable" and described its references to Dante and Rilke as "embarrassing".

In contrast to negative reviews, The New Life has reportedly become the fastest selling book in Turkish history at the time of its release. It sold 164,000 copies in a year and by 1997 that figure had exceeded 200,000.
