= Gazete ODTÜLÜ =

- Type: Online newspaper Campus newspaper
- Owner(s): Volkan Ertit
- Editor: Onur Görünmez
- Founded: 2006
- Headquarters: METU, Ankara, Turkey
- Website: www.gazeteodtulu.com

Gazete ODTÜLÜ is an independent, unofficial online student newspaper of METU (ODTÜ in Turkish) in Ankara, Turkey.

== Brief overview ==
When a group of students of METU founded Gazete ODTÜLÜ in October 2006, they have become the first online campus newspaper of Turkey. In their first anniversary, they have published a printed special edition which included the selected articles during the first year of their publication life.

== History ==
=== Interviews ===
In 2 years’ period, Gazete ODTÜLÜ has landed interviews with famous entertainers, artists, and notable figures and academics of METU. These people include...

- Goran Bregović
- Farid Farjad
- Haluk Bilginer
- Ezginin Günlüğü
- Vedat Sakman
- Yalçın Küçük
- Sunay Akın
- Ayla Algan
- Altan Erkekli
- Bekir Coşkun
- Yiğit Özgür
- Mehmet Eroğlu
- Barış Bayraktar
- Yansımalar

== People ==
=== 2008-09 Staff ===
| Name | Position |
|---|---|
| Volkan Ertit | Editor in Chief |
| Onur Görünmez | Editor in Chief |
| Ozan Önen | Editorial Consultant |
| Canan Saka | Executive Editor in Chief |
| İskender Özatlı | Executive Editor in Chief |
| Muhammet Kızıl | Executive Editor in Chief |
| Caner Çakmak | Managing Editor |
| Gökçe Türer | Asst. Managing Editor |
| Şule Demiröz | News Editor |
| Aslı Topsoy | News Editor |
| Hilal Fidan | Associate News Editor |
| Duhan Toparlak | Associate News Editor |
| Damla User | Secretary |
| İdil Hafızoğlu | Interview |
| Gözde Dönmez | Interview |
| Buğra Ahlatçı | External Affairs |
| Elvan Haberdar | External Affairs |
| Meltem Taşkın | External Affairs |
| Taylan Koca | Design and Technical Assistance |

=== Past Editors in Chief ===
| Name | Year |
|---|---|
| Volkan Ertit | 2006-2007 |
| Onur Görünmez | 2007-2008 |
| Canan Saka - İskender Özatlı (co-chiefs) | Fall 2008–present |
