= Charles Bonkowski =

Chemist and physician in Ottoman Empire

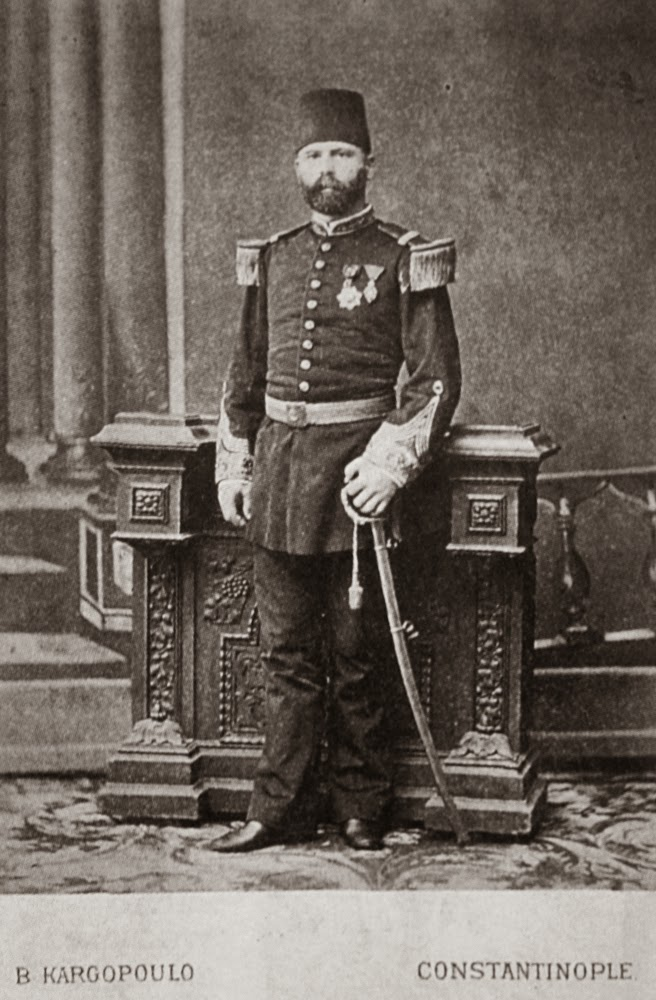
Bonkowski Pasha

Charles Bonkowski, or Bonkowski Pasha or Bonkowski Bey (1841–1905), was an Ottoman chemist and physician of Polish heritage. He served as Chief Chemist of the Sultan under Abdul Hamid II.

In the 1860s he studied chemistry and pharmacy in Paris with Edmond Frémy and Michel Eugène Chevreul.

He is featured as a character, in a fictional setting, in Orhan Pamuk's novel Nights of Plague.
