= Silent House =

Silent House may refer to:

- Silent House (novel), a 1983 novel by Orhan Pamuk
- The Silent House (1929 film), a British silent film directed by Walter Forde
- The Silent House (2010 film), a Uruguayan horror film
  - Silent House (2011 film), the American remake of the 2010 Uruguayan film
- "Silent House", a song co-written by Neil Finn (released on the Crowded House album Time On Earth) and the Chicks (on the album Taking the Long Way)
