= The White Castle =

1985 novel by Orhan Pamuk

- First edition (Turkish)
- Author: Orhan Pamuk
- Original title: Beyaz Kale
- Translator: Victoria Holbrook
- Language: Turkish
- Publisher: Carcanet Press (UK), George Braziller (US)
- Publication date: 1985
- Publication place: Turkey
- English publication date: 1990
- Media type: Print (Hardback & Paperback)

The White Castle (original Turkish title: Beyaz Kale) is a novel by Turkish writer Orhan Pamuk. It explores the relationship between an Italian slave and a Turkish master in the 17th-century Ottoman Empire, set against the backdrop of a rapidly transforming European world.

== Plot introduction ==
The events of this story take place in 17th century Istanbul. The story is about a young Italian scholar sailing from Venice to Naples who is taken prisoner by the Ottoman Empire. Soon after, he becomes the slave of a scholar known as Hoja (master), a man who is about his own age, and with whom he shares a strong physical resemblance.

Hoja reports to the Pasha, who asks him many questions about science and the world. Gradually Hoja and the narrator are introduced to the Sultan, for whom they eventually design an enormous iron weapon.

The slave is told to instruct the master in Western science and technology, from medicine to astronomy. But Hoja wonders why he and his slave are the persons they are and whether given knowledge of each other's most intimate secrets, they could actually exchange identities.

== Plot summary ==
The story begins with a frame tale in the form of a preface written by historian Faruk Darvinoglu (a character referenced in Pamuk's previous book, Silent House) between 1984 and 1985, according to the fictional dedication to the character's late sister at the beginning of the frame tale. Faruk recalls finding the story that follows in a storage room while looking through an archive in the governor's office in Gebze, among old bureaucratic papers. He takes the transcript, fascinated by its presence in such a place. During his breaks from work, he begins trying to find a source for the tale, hoping to authenticate its events and author. He is able to connect the author to Italy, but is unable to make any further progress. An acquaintance tells him that manuscripts such as the one he found could be found throughout the many old, wooden houses of Istanbul, mistaken for ancient Korans, and left venerated and unread. With some encouragement, he decides to publish the manuscript. The preface ends with Faruk noting that the publisher chose the title of the book, and a remark on the nature of modern readers will try to connect the dedication to his sister to the tale that follows. (See metafiction).

The story proper begins with an unnamed narrator being captured by the Turkish fleet while sailing from Venice to Naples. When the captain hesitates, the ship is taken, and the narrator and his fellows are captured. The narrator, fearing for his life, claims to be a doctor. Using basic anatomy, he's able to bluff successfully, but he is still imprisoned when the ship arrives. During his imprisonment, he is brought before the pasha, and cures him of his shortness of breath. Though he is still a slave, he begins to gain preferential treatment among the slaves and prison guards. When prisoners from Spain arrive, he tries to get word of home, to no avail. The pasha commissions him to work on a fireworks display for his son's wedding. He is surprised when the man he is to work with looks the same as he.

The narrator works with Hoja, believing that he'll have nothing useful to share with Hoja. He is surprised when Hoja tries to tout a poorly translated copy of Almageist, which receives a lukewarm reaction from the narrator. The two work on the fireworks display and the narrator's insights onto contemporary science goes a great deal to assist his doppelganger, leading to the display's success. After the wedding, the pasha offers the narrator his freedom under the condition that he convert to Islam. When he refuses, a mock execution is staged to pressure him. When he refuses even then, the pasha commends him and ridicules him for his stubbornness, before turning him over to Hoja's custody.

While living with Hoja, the narrator is the subject to Hoja's cruelty, ambitions, and inquiries. Using the narrator's knowledge of astronomy, as well as tales from Italy, he's able to entertain the young sultan. Hoja reveals his goal of gaining the sultan's favor in order to obtain the position as court astrologer. As Hoja becomes interested in the narrator's past, the two try to swap stories of “why” they are the way they are. While the narrator is able to do so, Hoja is unable to, as he is unable to find any flaws within himself. As the narrator continues to write about his past, Hoja becomes increasingly malicious and taunts the narrator over his past misdeeds, and claims that while he cannot admit his faults, because the narrator can, Hoja can claim superiority over him. When the plague breaks out, he uses the narrator's fear of it to torment him further. When it appears that the plague has killed him, the narrator runs away. Hoja, still alive, reclaims him. Hoja continues trying to learn about the narrator's past.

After the plague subsides, Hoja obtains the post of imperial astrologer. Competing over the influence of the sultan's mother and his youthful impatience, he sets out to create a great weapon that will prove his brilliance, and that of the Ottoman Empire's. They work on the weapon for the next six years. During this time, the narrator is shocked at how much Hoja knows about his past, and his mannerisms, and can imitate him perfectly. The narrator has nightmares about his loss of identity.

The weapon is completed in time for a siege in Poland, with the goal of a taking the titular white castle, the castle Doppio. The narrator learns from a distance that the weapon has not only failed, but that the Poles that they were attacking have obtained reinforcements from Hungary, Austria and the Cossacks. Fearing for his life, Hoja abandons the narrator and vanishes. The narrator goes into hiding as well.

The book closes with the narrator, now in his seventies, talking about his life after the failure at the white castle. He is married, with children, and has done quite well financially while he worked as royal astrologer, though he resigned his post before the intrigue got him killed. He has accepted that travelers that he sees are not coming to see him. He ponders what became of ‘Him’, who'd escaped to Italy. A traveling author, Evliya Chelebi, seeks him out, hoping to learn about Italy, as he'd once owned an Italian slave. The narrator agrees, and the two men share stories over the course of two weeks, before departing. The narrator tells us that it is this incident that inspired him to record the previous events of his life.

== Themes ==
The dynamic of the slave-master relationship is a recurring theme throughout The White Castle. Hoja, the master, tries to assume superiority over the narrator several times throughout the story, whether by ridiculing him for his childhood, or for his weakness and paranoia as a slave. However, Hoja spends just as much time trying to learn from the Narrator, and frustrated at the narrator when he withholds knowledge from him. The slave-master dynamic continues to deteriorate when the two realize they are able to switch identities.

The power of knowledge is another major theme in The White Castle. The Narrator and Hoja are both seen as intellectuals. However, while neither can truly claim that they know more than the other at first, the narrator's knowledge is contemporary, and more scientifically sound than Hoja's, which is filtered through another language, and then filtered again through dogma. The models of the heliocentric and geocentric universes also come to represent the two men and their views on the world. The narrator sees and uses his knowledge as a way to help whereas Hoja uses his knowledge to move his own ambitions forward.

The modernization, or rather, the failure to modernize, of the Ottoman Empire is hinted at throughout the story, before becoming a major symbol during the climax. The failure of The Ottoman Empire, and its modern counterparts, such as Turkey, to modernize along with its rivals is a common conflict and theme throughout Pamuk's work. The failure of the Ottomans to capture Dobbio is described by the narrator as their failure to attain something pure, perfect.

Ambiguity of self is a major conflict for the narrator. When the narrator first meets Hoja, Hoja looks as he did, or at least believes he looked, having not seen his reflection in some time. Hoja also realizes this, and as the two men learn more about each other, the realization that Hoja could trade places with him and return to Italy without any problems becomes a source of distress for the narrator. When Hoja can't be bothered to visit the sultan, he sends the narrator in his guise. There is also ambiguity in the final chapter of the book. The unreliable narrator, many years later, claims that he was inspired to write the story while exchanging stories with a traveler. Whether or not the story actually took place, and if it did, whether or not the narrator was the unnamed slave or Hoja is left unknown. Neither Hoja nor the narrator are mentioned, only a vague 'He'.

== See also ==
- Master-slave dialectic
