= Eroğlu =

Eroğlu is a surname. Notable people with the surname include:

- Beytullah Eroğlu (born 1995), Turkish Paralympic swimmer
- Derviş Eroğlu (born 1938), politician of Northern Cyprus
- Erbil Eroğlu (born 1993), Turkish basketball player
- Mehmet Eroğlu (born 1948), Turkish novelist
- Merve Nur Eroğlu (born 1993), Turkish female Paralympic archer
- Şeref Eroğlu (born 1975), Turkish sport wrestler
- Veysel Eroğlu (born 1948), Turkish politician
- Ahsen Eroğlu (born 1994), Turkish Actress
