= The Museum of Innocence (museum) =

- Masumiyet Müzesi
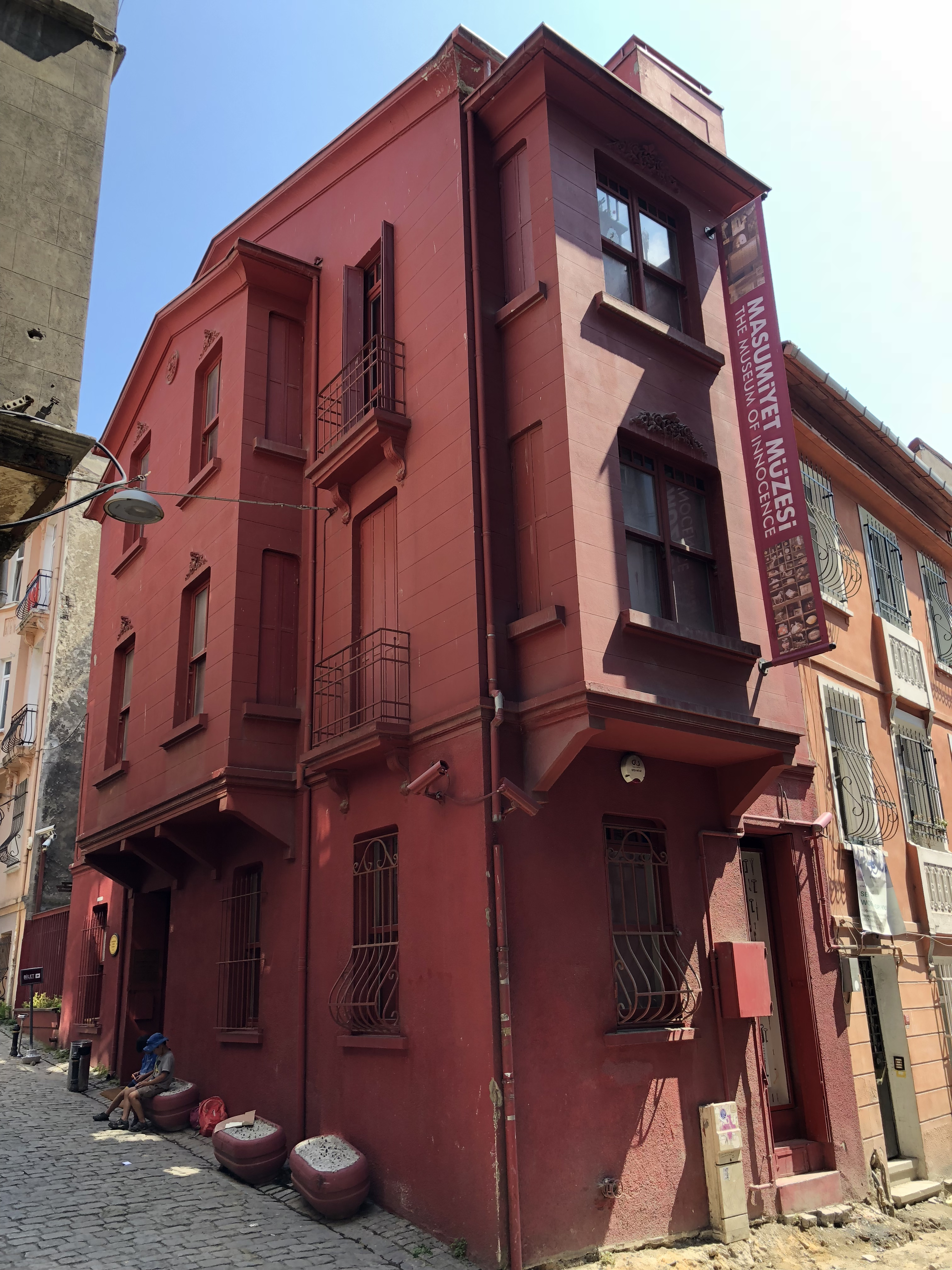
- A view of the Museum of Innocence from Çukurcuma Caddesi, Istanbul.
- Established: 2012; 14 years ago
- Location: Çukurcuma Caddesi, Dalgıç Çıkmazı, 2, 34425, Beyoğlu, Istanbul
- Coordinates: 41.030906°N 28.9797878°E
- Type: Specialized museum
- Founder: Orhan Pamuk
- Website: masumiyetmuzesi.org

The Museum of Innocence (Turkish: Masumiyet Müzesi) is a museum in a 19th-century house in Istanbul (Çukurcuma) created by novelist Orhan Pamuk as a companion to his novel The Museum of Innocence. The museum and the novel were created in tandem, centred on the stories of two Istanbul families. On 17 May 2014, the museum was announced as the winner of the 2014 European Museum of the Year Award.

The narrative and the museum offer a glimpse into upper-class Istanbul life from the 1970s to the early 2000s. The novel details the story of Kemal, a wealthy Istanbulite who falls in love with his poorer cousin, Füsun, and the museum displays the artefacts of their love story. According to the museum website, the collection, which includes more than a thousand objects, presents what the novel's characters "used, wore, heard, saw, collected and dreamed of, all meticulously arranged in boxes and display cabinets."

== History ==
Pamuk first began to collect objects for the museum in the mid-1990s. "I wanted to collect and exhibit the 'real' objects of a fictional story in a museum and to write a novel based on these objects," he said. Pamuk states that some of the objects displayed in the museum belonged to family and friends, while others were found elsewhere in Istanbul, or collected from around the world. However, he has not specified which of the objects are directly linked to his own life; he maintains that the narrative of the museum should reflect that of the novel and not his own, having stated that, "This is not Orhan Pamuk's museum."

After the novel was published in Turkish in 2008, the museum's collection was finalized, together with a multidisciplinary team of artists, designer and architects. It opened in April 2012 and now contains more than a thousand objects.

== Location ==
The museum is in the Çukurcuma neighbourhood of the Beyoğlu district of Istanbul in Turkey. It is housed in a 19th-century wooden house on the corner of Çukurcuma Sk and Dalgiç Sk.

== Concept ==
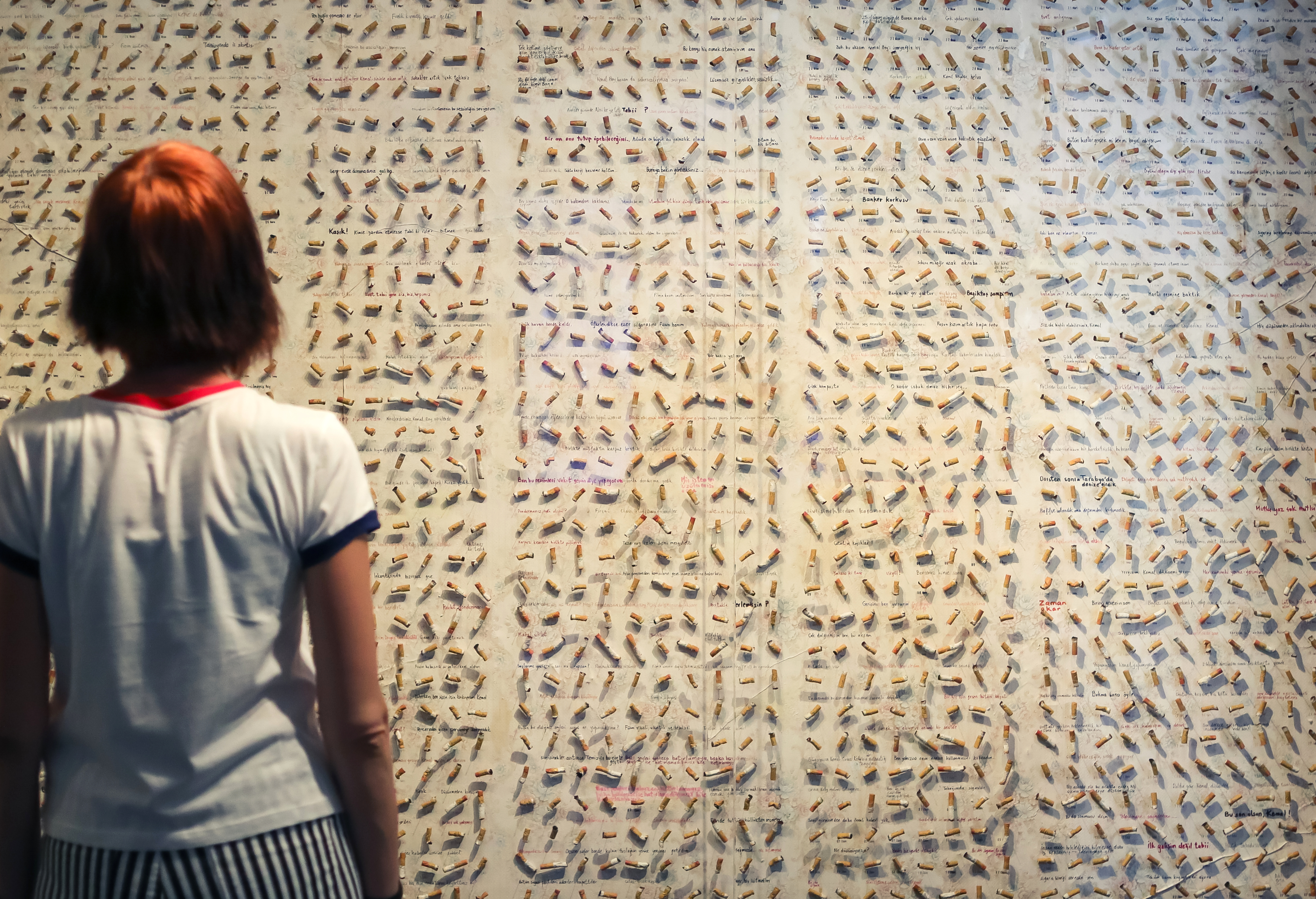
Wall of cigarette butts

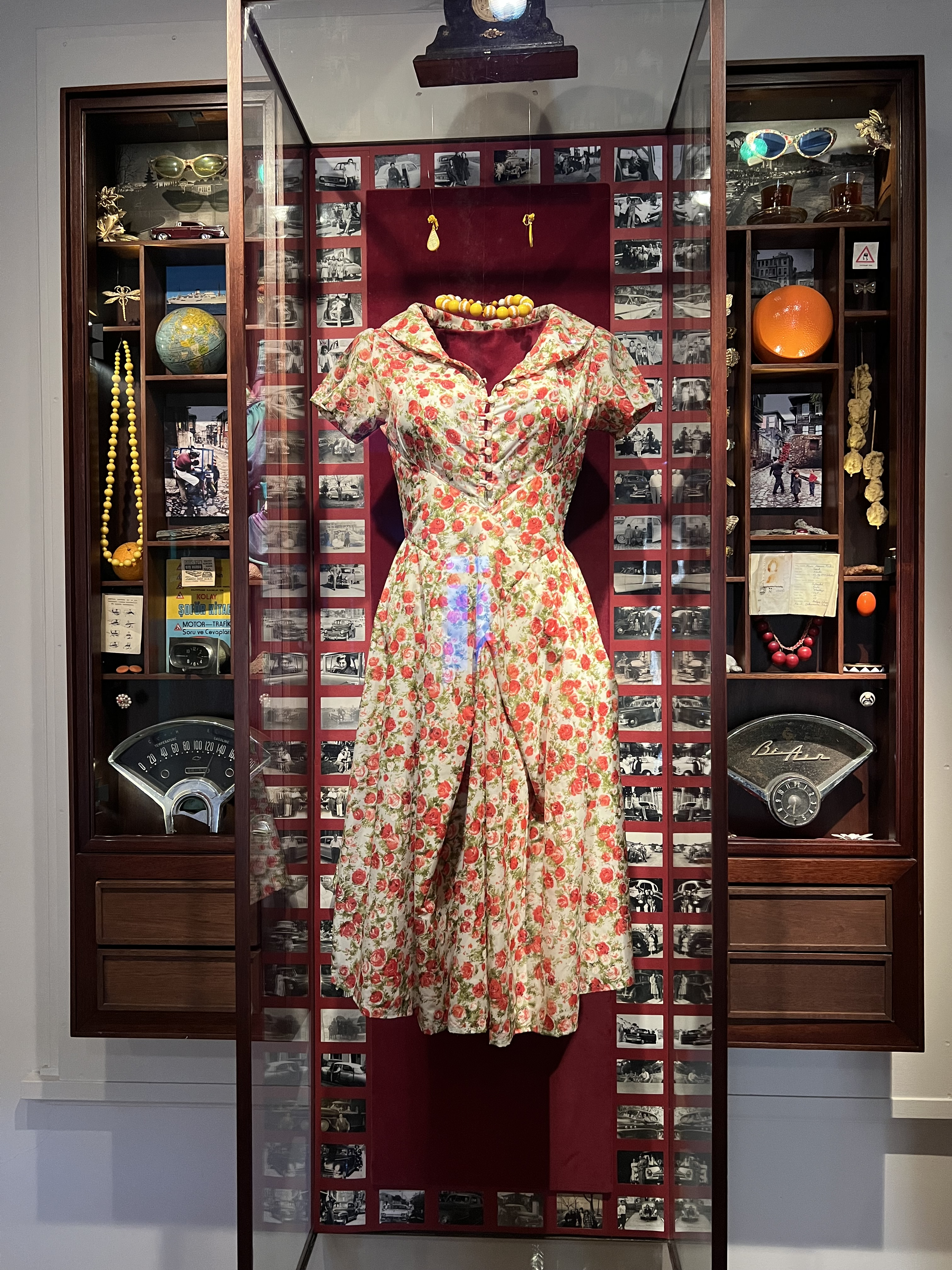

Situated in an area of Istanbul famous for the old antique shops that line its narrow streets, the museum reflects the character of everyday objects of 1970s upper-class Istanbul. It consists of a series of displays, each corresponding to one of the 83 chapters in the novel. According to the narrative, these objects were collected and arranged by Kemal, the novel's protagonist, as they are linked to his memories of Füsun, his love interest throughout the novel. The displays include a large glass case containing 4,213 cigarette butts, each smoked by Füsun, a collection of salt shakers, and paintings and maps of the Istanbul streets where the narrative takes place. Everything in the museum's four floors references the novel and the era in which the book is set. Despite the coupling of museum and novel, Pamuk maintains that they can be experienced independent of each other: "just as the novel is entirely comprehensible without a visit to the museum, so is the museum a place that can be visited and experienced on its own."

Pamuk developed the idea for the museum and novel in parallel from the outset; the museum is not 'based on' the novel, and likewise the novel was not written to capture the museum. This blurring of lines between the two has been explored both in the novel The Museum of Innocence and in the museum catalogue, The Innocence of Objects. In the early 1990s, Pamuk began collecting objects from the past that he saw and liked in junk dealers' shops and friends' homes, gradually forming the narrative that would become The Museum of Innocence. If he saw an object that he thought suited the novel in a junk shop, he bought it and described it in the text. He might stumble upon an object that would inspire a new story in the novel; or he might seek out objects to fit an existing story.

=== Manifesto for museums ===
In "The Innocence of Objects," a catalogue describing the creation of the novel-museum, Pamuk lays out a manifesto for museums. He calls for exchanging "Large national museums such as the Louvre and the Hermitage" for "smaller, more individualistic, and cheaper" museums, telling "stories" in the place of "histories." A museum, he writes, should work in its capacity to "reveal the humanity of individuals."

=== Exhibitions abroad ===
- 2024/2025 DOX, Centre for Contemporary Art, Prague
