= Çukurcuma =

Neighborhood in Istanbul, Turkey

Coordinates: 41°01′54″N 28°58′50″E

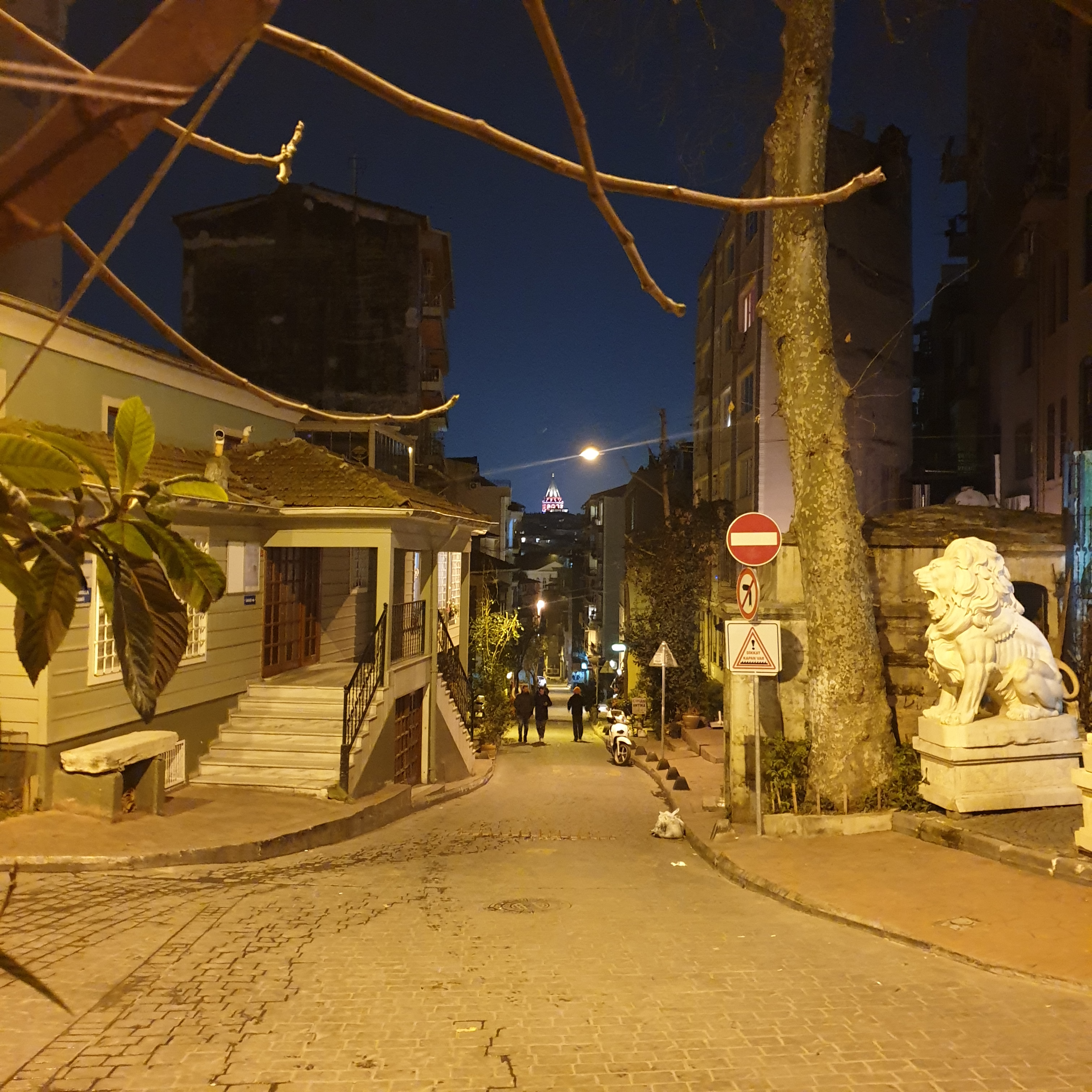
Çukurcuma Caddesi with the Galata Tower

Çukurcuma (pronounced chu-KUR-ju-ma; meaning "Friday Valley" in Turkish) is a district of Beyoğlu (in Istanbul, Turkey), made up of the Kuloğlu and Firuzağa neighbourhoods. It lies south-east of İstiklal Caddesi in a valley, not far from Galatasaray Square and between the Tomtom and Cihangir neighbourhoods. The main thoroughfare is Çukurcuma Caddesi. The buildings largely date from the 19th century, although there has also been a lot of 20th-century development.

In 2008 The Guardian devoted an article to Çukurcuma. In 2012, the newspaper described it as one of the five best places to live worldwide.

== History ==
The area of today's Çukurcuma was not inhabited in the Byzantine period.

During the Conquest of Constantinople (1453), Sultan Mehmed the Conqueror is said to have initiated Friday prayer in the valley, giving rise to its name. The Muhittin Molla Fenari Mosque is said to date from Mehmed's reign. Originally built between 1541 and 1547 to a design of the Ottoman architect Mimar Sinan, it was commissioned for the Shaikh al-Islam Çivizade Hacı Mehmed Efendi.

In the 19th century, Çukurcuma expanded as a residential district. In addition to ethnic Turks, Armenians, Greeks and Western Europeans lived here and established schools, hospitals and diplomatic missions. In 1882 the Liceo Italiano Galileo Galilei joined the Greek Zografeion-Lyceum high school. The Greek Consulate General also occupies a building in the neighbourhood.

The 1955 Istanbul pogrom hit Çukurcuma hard, and almost all the remaining Turkish Greeks and Armenians subsequently emigrated.

In 2008, Orhan Pamuk published his novel The Museum of Innocence, much of it set in Çukurcuma. In 2012, Pamuk opened an actual Museum of Innocence in a wooden house on one of the back streets of the district. It was recognized as European Museum of the Year in 2014. In 2026, Netflix adapted the novel into a series.

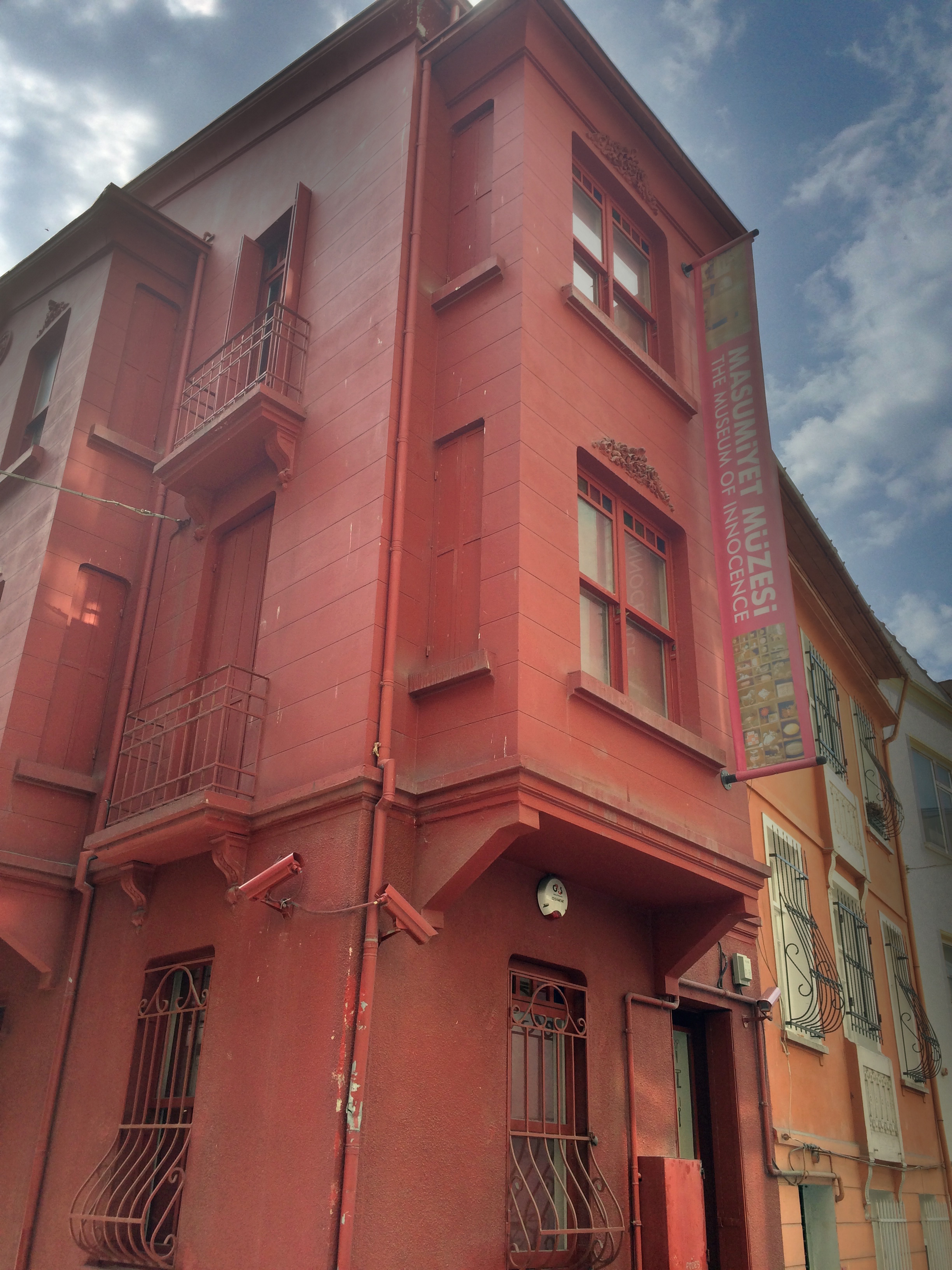
Front of "The Museum of Innocence" in Çukurcuma
