= Erdağ Göknar =

Turkish-American scholar, literary translator and poet

Erdağ Göknar is a Turkish-American scholar, literary translator, and poet. He is an Associate Professor of Turkish and Middle Eastern Studies at Duke University and Director of the Duke University Middle East Studies Center.

Göknar is best known for his award-winning translation of Orhan Pamuk's Ottoman historical novel, My Name is Red (Knopf 2001; Everyman's Library 2010), which marked Pamuk's emergence as an author of world literature, contributing to his selection as Nobel laureate in 2006. John Updike commented on the translation in The New Yorker: "Translating from the Turkish, a non-Indo-European language with a grammar that puts the verb at the end of even the longest sentence, isn't a task for everybody; Erdağ Göknar deserves praise for the cool, smooth English in which he has rendered Pamuk's finespun sentences, passionate art appreciations, slyly pedantic debates, eerie urban scenes ... and exhaustive inventories." The best-selling novel was awarded the 2003 International Dublin Literary Award, a 100,000 Euro prize that acknowledges both translator and author and was reissued as part of the Everyman's Library Contemporary Classics in 2010.

Göknar's translation of Atiq Rahimi's Earth and Ashes (Harcourt) from Dari was shortlisted for the IMPAC Literary Award in 2004 and reissued by Other Press in 2010. In 2008 Göknar translated modernist Turkish author Ahmet Hamdi Tanpınar's iconic novel of Istanbul A Mind at Peace (Archipelago, 2008/2011), which was awarded a translation grant from the National Endowment for the Arts. The translation was presented to President Barack Obama by the Turkish government during a state visit in 2009.

Göknar's critical articles have appeared in journals such as South Atlantic Quarterly, Novel: A Forum on Fiction, and the Journal of Middle East Women's Studies.

In 2013, Göknar published a work of literary and cultural criticism entitled Orhan Pamuk, Secularism and Blasphemy: The Politics of the Turkish Novel (Routledge), which argues that productive tension between literary tropes of din (Turkish Islam) and devlet (state secularism) informs Pamuk's work and marks its currency as world literature.

His collection of poetry, Nomadologies (Turtle Point Press), appeared in 2017 and is a poetics of Turkish-American diaspora, addressing themes of cultural dislocation.

Göknar is the recipient of two Fulbright Fellowship awards.

== Translations ==
- My Name is Red (Benim Adım Kırmızı) by Orhan Pamuk (Knopf, 2001)
- Earth and Ashes (Khakester o Khak) by Atiq Rahimi (Harcourt, 2004)
- A Mind at Peace (Huzur) by Ahmet Hamdi Tanpınar (Archipelago Books, 2008)

== Cultural Criticism ==
- Orhan Pamuk, Secularism, and Blasphemy: The Politics of the Turkish Novel (Routledge, 2013)

== Edited volumes ==
- Mediterranean Passages: Readings from Dido to Derrida (Univ. of North Carolina Press, 2008)

== Poetry ==
- Nomadologies: Poems (Turtle Point Press, 2017)
