= The Red-Haired Woman =

Novel by Orhan Pamuk

- First edition (Turkish)
- Author: Orhan Pamuk
- Original title: Kırmızı Saçlı Kadın
- Publication date: 2016
- Publication place: Turkey

The Red-Haired Woman is a 2016 novel by Turkish writer Orhan Pamuk. Alex Preston, writing in The Guardian, referred to the novel as "deceptively simple".

The novel was translated into English by Ekin Oklap. An abridged translation was read on BBC Radio 4 in 2022.

== Summary ==
Cem is a high school student living with his mother in Istanbul in 1980. Cem is more friendly with his mother, but he is a little distant from his father. Cem's father is a pharmacist and Cem brings lunch to his father every day. One day, Cem's mother tells Cem that his father will not come again. Cem, resentful of this, starts looking for a job in order to avoid financial difficulties and to be able to attend the private teaching institution he sees as necessary for his university dreams. Cem first started working in a bookstore, then, upon recommendation, he started working in the well drilling business.

Hayri Bey, one of the other heroes of the novel, wants to establish a new textile factory, but drilling needs to be done in the area for the textile factory. Since there were no machine drilling operations at that time, he gave Mahmut Usta, one of the leading well drillers of the period, the job of searching for water in the area. Master Mahmut starts drilling with Cem and Ali. Cem, who got used to his master in a short time, has a great love for his master and sees him as his father. The search for water in the area where the textile factory will be built took longer than necessary, and during these working days, Cem encountered a red-haired woman and fell in love with her. Cem, who tried to see the red-haired woman every day, soon learned that this woman was an actress and married. Cem and the Red Haired Woman; They met one day when the woman's husband was not at home and had sex. Around this time, Ali, the apprentice of Master Mahmut, quit his job. While Cem was working with his master one day after being with the Red Haired Woman; A bucket fell on the master's head from a height of twenty meters. Cem thought that he could not save his master, and later left the city.

Years later, Cem, a successful contractor, needs to go to Öngeren for a job. After a certain time, Cem learns that he has a son named Enver. Enver is Cem's child from his relationship with the Red Haired Woman. Enver introduces himself to his father as a different person, and after a while, in a fight between the two, Enver kills his father and goes to prison.
