= Nights of Plague =

2021 novel by Orhan Pamuk

- Author: Orhan Pamuk
- Original title: Veba Geceleri
- Translator: Ekin Oklap
- Language: Turkish
- Genre: Historical fiction
- Publisher: Yapi Kredi Yayinlari
- Publication date: March 23, 2021
- Publication place: Turkey
- English publication date: October 4, 2022
- Media type: Print (hardback & paperback)
- Pages: 544 pp. (original Turkish); 704 pp. (English translation)
- ISBN: 978-0525656890

Nights of Plague (Turkish: Veba Geceleri) is a 2021 novel by Orhan Pamuk. It is his 11th and second-longest novel. Inspired by historical events, it is set on a fictitious island, Mingheria, in the eastern Mediterranean between Crete and Cyprus.

A number of early reviewers observed that Nights of Plague's plot resembles that of Albert Camus's novel The Plague. Its English translation, by Ekin Oklap, was published by Knopf Doubleday in the United States and Faber and Faber in the United Kingdom.

== Background ==
In 2016, Pamuk began writing a historical novel about a bubonic plague epidemic on a fictitious island. He was particularly interested in the way plagues are Orientalized in such books as Defoe's A Journal of the Plague Year, Manzoni's The Betrothed, and Camus's The Plague. In a 2020 article, he wrote that Western observers such as Defoe saw a fatalistic tendency in the Muslim worldview—the religious concept of "Every Man's end being determined", as Defoe put it.

== Plot summary ==
In 1901, a ship from Istanbul arrives on the island of Mingheria, where bubonic plague has broken out. Mingheria serves as a microcosm of the declining Ottoman Empire, where diverse groups coexist but are on the brink of disintegration. The plague reflects the empire's metaphorical characterization as "the sick man of Europe". To combat it, Sultan Abdul Hamid II dispatches Bonkowski Pasha, the empire's chief inspector of public health, and a Muslim epidemiologist, Prince Consort Doctor Nuri, and his wife, the sultan's niece Princess Pakize.

When Bonkowski is murdered, it falls upon Pakize and Nuri to employ methods reminiscent of Sherlock Holmes to identify the culprit. Simultaneously, Western approaches to controlling the plague are attempted, but the islanders resist quarantine measures, resulting in an increasing number of infections and deaths.

== Themes and style ==
Matt A. Hanson of World Literature Today noted that the motifs of Nights of Plague are prevalent in the latter years of Ottoman collapse, notably during Abdul Hamid II's disastrous reign. Pamuk fictionalizes the formation of the fragmented political identities that sparked World War I and eventually strengthened the foundations of the Turkish republic. In The Atlantic, Judith Shulevitz wrote that Nights of Plague is plainly satire and metaphor, mordantly riffing on Ottoman, revolutionary, and nationalist leadership styles in a critique of Atatürk, Kemalism, and even President Erdoğan's government—but not in a single sentence.

== Reception ==
In his review for The New Yorker, James Wood noted that Pamuk, though aware how plague has historically been unfairly Orientalized, seems to relish Orientalizing Mingheria, imbuing it with swirls of Ottoman magic and mythology. Toward the end of the book, its narrator mentions the "negatively inflected sense" of Edward Said's term "Orientalism".

In his review for The Times, Peter Kemp wrote that Nights of Plague masterfully weaves a tale of intrigue and disease.
