= Cihangir =

- Neighbourhood
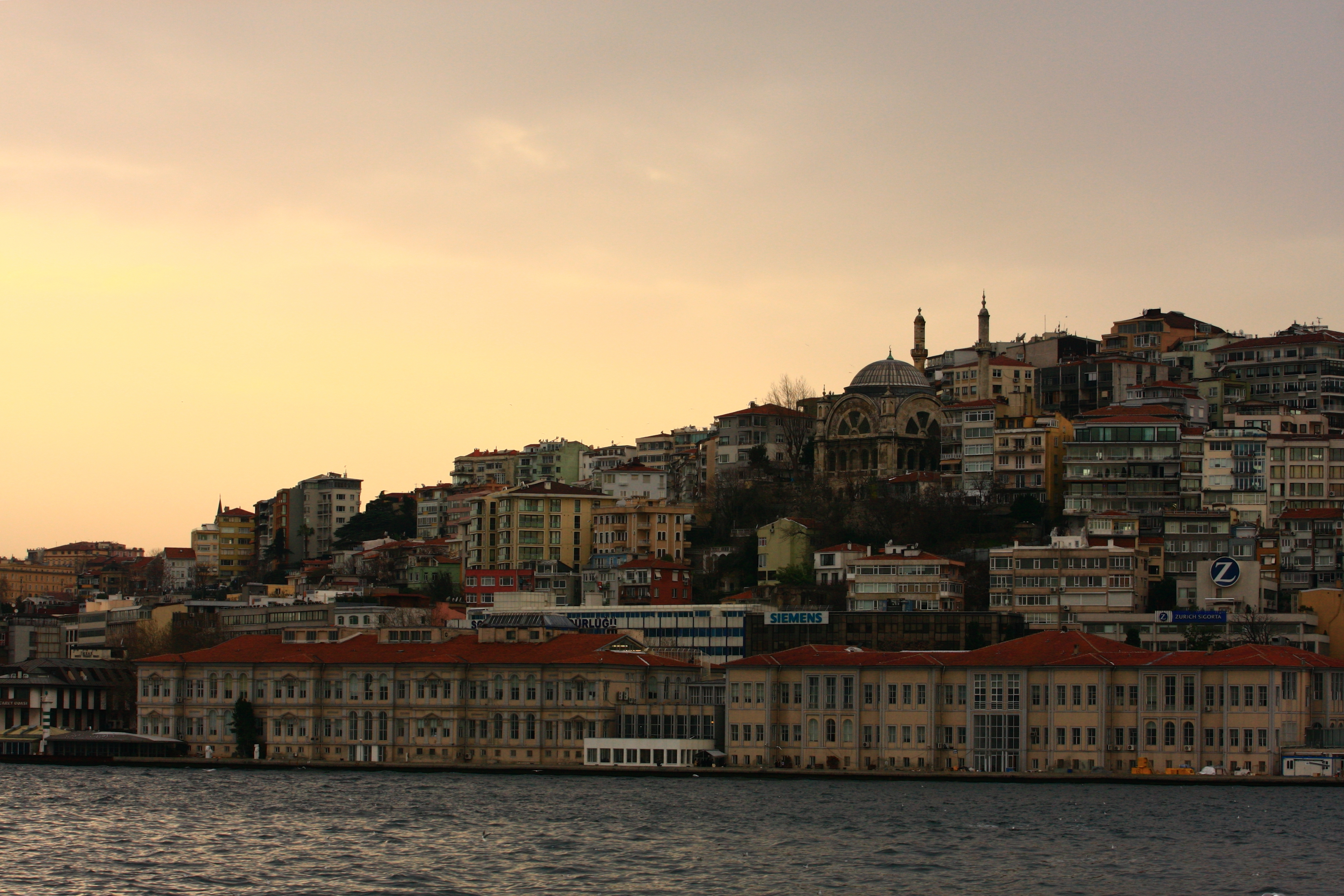

- Location within Turkey Location within Istanbul
- Coordinates: 41°01′59″N 28°59′07″E
- Country: Turkey
- Province: Istanbul
- District: Beyoğlu

Government
  - Muhtar: Adnan Bal
- Population (2022): 3,739
- Time zone: UTC+3 (TRT)

Cihangir is an affluent neighbourhood in the municipality and district of Beyoğlu, Istanbul Province, Turkey. Its population is 3,739 (2022). It is located between Taksim Square and Kabataş. It has many narrow streets, two parks, and many street cafes especially in and around Akarsu Yokuşu Sokağı.

The neighbourhood has a bohemian reputation. It is known for its artists, writers, actors, and expatriates – as well as its large army of street cats. It was also a stronghold for protesters during the Gezi Park protests.

Cihangir was named after Şehzade Cihangir whose heartbroken father, Suleiman the Magnificent, had Mimar Sinan build a mosque overlooking the Bosphorus to commemorate his death. The name means "conqueror" in Turkish and, in turn, comes from the Persian compound word jahan + gir (جهانگیر), meaning "conqueror of the world". Today, the Cihangir Mosque, originally built in 1559 but reconstructed in 1889, offers views across the Bosphorus to Sarayburnu.

In 2012, British newspaper The Guardian included Cihangir and neighbouring Çukurcuma in the list of the five best places in the world to live, next to Santa Cruz de Tenerife, in Spain; the district of Sankt Pauli, in Hamburg, the north coast of Maui, in Hawaii and Portland, in the U.S. state of Oregon.

Ece Temelkuran wrote that this neighbourhood is like Soho, Manhattan.

== Demographics ==
Historical population
Year	Pop.	±% p.a.
2007	3,641	—
2012	3,653	+0.07%
2017	3,482	−0.95%
2022	3,739	+1.43%
Source: TÜIK (2007-2022)

== History ==
During Byzantine times, the area of the present neighborhood was probably not settled, although there were Byzantine buildings near present-day Tophane and Fındıklı below Cihangir.

During the reign of Suleiman the Magnificent, the area was a forested hunting ground. It was one of the favourite places of Suleiman's son Cihangir after whom it is named.

In the second half of the 19th century, the increasing influx of non-Ottoman Europeans into Istanbul drove up real estate prices in the nearby Pera district in Beyoğlu, to which they were officially confined. Some Europeans, however, acquired land in areas outside Pera such as Tophane, Fındıklı, and Cihangir, leading to a great deal of upmarket residential development in those neighbourhoods.

Starting in the 1930s, non-Muslim residents of Cihangir and the rest of Beyoğlu left or were forced out. They were replaced by Muslims from other Istanbul neighbourhoods and by internal migrants from eastern Turkey. As the character of the neighbourhood changed, middle-class Muslims also began leaving it. By the 1970s, Cihangir was known as an area where Anatolian migrants lived alongside artists and intellectuals. Steady gentrification pushed up house prices in the area during the 2010s but after the inconveniences inflicted on local residents by the troubles around the Gezi Park protests of 2013, there was something of an exodus from the area. In particular, younger more bohemian people started to move across the Bosphorus to Kadıköy. Since 2020, however, the exodus has gone into reverse and house prices were once again soaring by 2021.

In the early twenty-first century, Cihangir became well known for its cafes, artists, and bohemian culture. In addition, the neighborhood is known for its street cats, and local residents help feed and take care of the cats. The documentary Kedi, which profiles street cats, was largely filmed in Cihangir. The neighborhood is used as a nickname to designate upper class leftists called "Cihangir leftist" (Turkish: Cihangir solcusu), or the Turkish version of the term "champagne socialist".
