= Silent House (novel) =

1983 novel by Orhan Pamuk

First edition (Turkish)

Silent House (Turkish: Sessiz Ev) is the second novel by Turkish author Orhan Pamuk, published in 1983 after Cevdet Bey and His Sons. The novel tells the story of a week in which three siblings go to visit their grandmother in Cennethisar, a small town near Istanbul. The book has received positive retrospective reviews from critics.

== Background ==
Silent House has 32 chapters. Each chapter is narrated from a different narrator's point of view in the first person. The names of the five narrators in the novel in turn are Recep, Fatma, Hasan, Faruk and Metin. The narrator of the opening chapter is Recep and the narrator of the closing chapter is Buyukhanim. Each of the narrators has a different number of chapters to tell. Hasan has eight, Buyukhanim seven, Recep six, Faruk six, and Metin has five chapters. The distribution of the chapters to the narrators is as following:

Narrator	Chapter
Recep	1, 6, 13, 19, 27, 30
Fatma	2, 7, 11, 16, 23, 29, 32
Hasan	3, 8, 12, 17, 20, 22, 26, 31
Faruk	4, 9, 14, 18, 24, 28
Metin	5, 10, 15, 21, 25

The novel makes use of stream of consciousness and internal monologue.

== Setting ==
The book takes place in Cennethisar, a small town near Istanbul. It is set in July 1980. Silent House takes place just one month before the military coup of September 12 in Turkey. Therefore, the novel carries the influence of the great political tension.

== Plot ==
Behçet Necatigil summarizes the plot of the novel: One of the five narrators of Silent House, historian Faruk does some research on Ottoman History in an archive in Gebze which is a small town near Istanbul.

The novel starts in an old, big and silent house in Cennethisar which is a part of Gebze. The owner of the house is an old, lonely and depressed woman named Fatma Hanim who is also referred to as grandmother and Buyukhanim in the novel. Recep who is a dwarf is responsible for everything related to the house such as feeding Buyukhanim, taking her to and from bed, cleaning the house, washing the dishes, and doing the shopping for the house. The three grandchildren of Buyukhanim will come to visit her for a week the next day. All the preparation for their arrival has been made.

Fatma Hanim thinks about her grandchildren in her bed at night. She plans how and what she is going to talk to them when they arrive. Then she starts to think of the past. She remembers her late husband Selahattin Bey. Dr. Selahattin Bey is a man of free mind. He does not like the government of Committee of Union and Progress which is a political party. Therefore he is forced to go to an exile in Gebze leaving Istanbul behind. The house where Fatma Hanim lives now has been made in those days in exile. During their marriage, he dedicated his life to working on a massive encyclopedia that he claimed would enlighten the nation, freeing its people from, among other things, what he saw as a foolish belief in God. His behavior, as Fatma relates, ultimately drove away all of his patients.

The grandchildren arrive on the day they are supposed to come. The eldest one is Faruk who is a historian. He works as an associate professor at the university. Nilgun is a student of sociology. She is a revolutionist. Metin is a high school student. He dreams of going to America and getting rich there. While they talk, Recep prepares the dinner table. After the dinner, Faruk and Nilgun start a long conversation. Metin goes out and finds his friend Vedat. They join in a group of rich youths. Metin falls in love with a girl in this group whose name is Ceylan.

Next morning Fatma Hanim and her grandchildren go to Selahattin Bey's grave. They pray. Fatma Hanim can't help crying. She is offended by her grandchildren's insensitivity. Faruk starts to do some research in the archive of Gebze District. He starts to examine old newspapers, magazines and court files. He really enjoys it. He aims to shed light on the past of the town. In the evening, they talk about the documents he has worked on during the day. Metin has a lot of fun every day. Once when he is drunk he tells Ceylan that he loves her but she does not care.

After finishing his work at home, Recep goes out at night to walk around. He looks around on the streets by himself. He is concerned about young people's making fun of his being very short. Recep's nephew Hasan is a right-wing terrorist. He puts on display posters on the walls of the streets with his friends at night. They write slogans defaming communism and socialism. During the day, they exact money from town's artisans. Hasan is a childhood friend of Nilgun and he likes her. Nilgun realizes this but she does not encourage him. She goes to the beach every morning with a book in her hands. She buys a Republican Newspaper on her way back home. Hasan follows her and realizes that she is a leftist. He tells about it to his friends. They do not approve Hasan's feeling an interest for such a girl and get angry with him. They make a plan to do something bad to her. Hasan appears in front of Nilgun suddenly while she is going back home to tell her about the plan that his friends made for her. However, Nilgun does not listen to him. She cries out "You, fascist!". Hasan gets very angry with this behavior and beats Nilgun badly on the street and runs away. Recep and the woman from the pharmacy take Nilgun home. The pharmacy lady tells her that she needs to go to a hospital but she does not want to go. She has bruises all over her body and face.

Faruk, Metin and Nilgun talk about what has happened. They decide to go back to Istanbul in the morning. Recep tells their decision to Fatma Hanim in the morning. They will go to say goodbye to her after the breakfast. However, after the breakfast, Nilgun does not feel well and she goes to her room to lie down. She gets worse after a while. Then she dies from cerebral hemorrhage. Her brothers are in shock. They don't know what to do. Meanwhile, Fatma Hanim waits for them to come upstairs and say goodbye to her. She calls Recep but he does not go to upstairs, either. She tries to go downstairs but she can't. She lies down on her bed and pulls her cover on her head. The house is in complete silence. Hasan goes to the station and reads the newspaper with fear and curiosity. He checks if there is any news about Nilgun. He leaves from Cennethisar taking a train.

== Author's interpretations ==
Orhan Pamuk's observations about the novel are very significant in terms of the novel's analysis. All of the quotation are taken from the first edition of his book "The Other Colors" in which he brings his various writings together.

- The author's approach to the novel

I know that young people like Silent House most among my books. Maybe it is because there is something about my youth and my spirit in it... Each of the young characters in Silent House was me. In each of them, I tampered a different aspect of the youth. ( p.132)

- On the families in the novel

I understand these families as I grew up in the neighbourhoods similar to this and as I knew grandmothers like this and to some extend [sic], yes, as it was easy for me. (p.131)

- On the birth of Silent House

One of the inspirations of Silent House is the letters that my grandfather wrote to my grandmother... My grandfather goes to Berlin to study law in the beginning of the 20th century. before he goes, they engage with my grandmother, Nikfal. My grandfather writes many letters to his fiance in Istanbul while he studies in Berlin. The attitude of these letters are like Selahattin Bey's teachings of Fatma Hanim. I know that my grandmothers' attitude to these letters are of sin, forbidden things and indifference. When I tried to dream about their unhappy relationship I had started to fictionalize Silent House.

- On the young people in Silent House

The details and the environment of the youth in the novel, their car racing, their getting drunk in house gatherings, their going to discos and going to the beach and killing time are from the real stories of my friends in Sahil neighborhood in the early 1970s. We went there some time during summers. I remember those young people who would take their father's cars and racing with their friends. I was among them and while I was writing this novel I remembered them with a smile on my face. (p.132)

- On the characters of Silent House

... Today there are less people who aim to change his country radically with culture. The encyclopedic grandchildren of Selahattin Bey cannot write their own encyclopedias like he did. I think today, we are not as radical as Selahattin Bey even as an idea importer. As a result, I don't want anybody to think that I look down on people like Selahattin Bey. (p.131)

A number of reviewers have compared the character of Selahattin to Edward Casaubon in Middlemarch. One reviewer argued that the book "inherits its tense atmosphere of conflicting ideologies" from Fathers and Sons, which Nilgun reads.

== Reception ==
Silent House received various reviews in the 2010s after the release of the English translation by Robert Finn, which was praised by some (like Francine Prose) but criticized by others such as reviewers William Armstrong and The Washington Post's Marie Arana.

Armstrong, in Hurriyet Daily News, described the novel as "one of [Pamuk's] more successful balancing acts between ["his taste for lofty intellectual flights of fancy and the need to spin a good yarn"]. It successfully knits social, historical, and philosophical considerations". Calling it a gripping snapshot of a divided country, he described the use of interior monologues narrated by each character as "a Faulknerian touch that gives thrust and variety to the story". Armstrong also said Silent House is a good introduction to Pamuk for new readers. Arana wrote that "it will have you flipping back and forth constantly, wondering how the puzzle fits [...] it is a remarkable mirror on the din and dissonance of the day." Max Liu, in The Independent, praised "its immediacy, topicality, early signs of the inventiveness and conviction that would later distinguish novels such as The Black Book and The Museum of Innocence."

Asif Farrukhi argued in Dawn that "Pamuk focuses his attention on individual lives and their concerns, without indulging in political allegorisation or heavy symbolism to make them more 'representative' of what is happening in the country [...] With a sure and steady hand, he introduces larger questions which [characters] are confronted with". He also praised the story between Nilgun and Hasan as having a "moving Dostoveskyan [sic] conclusion". In The Independent, David Evans said the book succeeds as a commentary on contemporary Turkish politics, and also argued that "Pamuk nimbly shifts between these characters as they muse on the subjects close to them [...] demonstrating an early mastery of technique. [...] in dramatising a range of different perspectives, the book stresses the importance of listening to dissenting views".

Francine Prose described the experience of reading the book as "very pleasurable" and explained, "The book is dense, threaded through with ideas about history, religion, memory, class and politics. But it never seems didactic because the reader comes to realize that these reflections are aspects of the inner life: plausible components of the characters’ psyches." The Guardian's Mark Lawson implied that Silent House was not among Pamuk's finest works, and said some cultural tensions within the country are represented "perhaps a little schematically." Nonetheless, Lawson stated, "A novelist prescient enough to publish [Hasan's predictions about the involvement of Islamist young men in a terrible event] in 1983 proved himself fully deserving of the call from the Swedish Academy in 2006." A writer for Kirkus Reviews argued, "Using a repetitive, circular, incremental technique, Pamuk builds a multifaceted panorama distinguished by his customary intellectual richness and breadth."

A reviewer in Publishers Weekly was more unfavorable, saying, "While Pamuk deftly suggests the political strife that roiled Turkish society before the 1980 coup, this narrative never achieves the richness and depth of his later work. All but one of the eight major characters are neurotic, self-pitying, resentful, contemptuous of others—even while they yearn to assuage their loneliness—and filled with grandiose dreams of what they’ll never achieve." Emily Donaldson wrote in Toronto Star that "those new to his work [...] would do best to start elsewhere."

== Awards ==
- 1984 Madaralı Roman Ödülü
- 1991 Prix de la découverte européenne (European Discovery Award)
- 2012 Man Asian Literary Prize shortlist for the English translation
- Winner of Nobel Prize in Literature

== Translations ==
- Finnish: Hiljainen talo, by Tuula Kojo (Helsinki: Tammi, 2011).
- French: La maison du silence, by Münevver Andaç (Paris: Gallimard, 1988).
- Italian: La casa del silenzio, by Francesco Bruno (Milano: Frassinelli, 1993).
- Portuguese: A casa do silêncio, by Filipe Guerra (Lisboa : Editorial Presença, 2008)
- Dutch: Het huis van de stilte, by Margreet Dorleijn (Amsterdam : De Arbeiderspers, 1995).
- Swedish: Det tysta huset, by Dilek Gür (Stockholm : Norstedt, 1998).
- Spanish: La casa del silencio, by Rafael Carpintero Ortega (Madrid : Metáfora Ediciones, 2001).
- Russian: Дом тишины (Dom Tishiny), by Apollinarija Avrutina (Sankt-Peterburg : Amfora, 2007).
- Croatian: Tiha kuća, by Marta Andrić (Zagreb : Vuković & Runjić, 2008).
- Polish: Dom ciszy, by Anna Akbike Sulimowicz (Kraków : Wydawnictwo Literackie, 2009).
- German: Das stille Haus, by Gerhard Meier (München : Hanser, 2009)
- Georgian: მდუმარე სახლი, by Lia Chlaidze (Tbilisi : Bakur Sulakauri Publishing, 2012)
- Persian: خانه‌ی خاموش, by Sara Mostafapour (Tehran: Markaz, 2014)
- English: Silent House, by Robert Finn (New York : Knopf, 2012)

== Bibliography ==
- Aksungur, Bilal
  - Orhan Pamuk'un Romanlarında Şahıslar Kadrosu, Yüksek Lisans Tezi, Çanakkale OnSekiz Mart Üniversitesi, Sosyal Bilimler Enstitüsü, Türk Dili ve Edebiyatı Anabilim Dalı. Tez No: 160927.
    - Not: Sayfa 72-144 Sessiz Ev üzerinedir; özellikle roman kişileri üzerine ayrıntılı bilgiler içerir.
    - → Yüksek Öğretim Kurulu Ulusal Tez Merkezi adresinden PDF dosyasına ulaşılabilir.
- Aral, Fahri (yay. haz.)
  - Orhan Pamuk Edebiyatı. Sempozyum Tutanakları (İstanbul: Sabancı Üniversitesi, 2006).
- Ecevit, Yıldız
  - Orhan Pamuk'u Okumak (İstanbul: Gerçek, 1996).
  - Türk Romanında Postmodernist Açılımlar (İstanbul: İletişim, 2006).
- Güllü, Nuray
  - "Sessiz Ev" Üzerine Bir Metindilbilim Çalışması, Yüksek Lisans Tezi, On Dokuz Mayıs Üniversitesi, Sosyal Bilimler Enstitüsü, Türk Dili ve Edebiyatı Anabilim Dalı. Tez No: 32187.
    - → Yüksek Öğretim Kurulu Ulusal Tez Merkezi adresinden PDF dosyasına ulaşılabilir.
- Karakaşoğlu, Yasemin
  - Fünf Stimmen im lautlosen Haus (Wiesbaden: Harrassowitz, 1993). [kaynakça: s. 107-112]
- Kılıç, Engin (der.)
  - Orhan Pamuk'u Anlamak (İstanbul: İletişim, 1999).
- Kırkoğlu, Serdar Rifat
  - "Bir Zaman Romanı: Sessiz Ev", Çağdaş Eleştiri Dergisi, 1984.
- Pamuk, Orhan
  - Öteki Renkler: Seçme Yazılar ve Bir Hikâye (İstanbul: İletişim, 2006).
    - Not: S. 130-133, Orhan Pamuk'un Sessiz Ev üzerine bir söyleşisini ve gözlemlerini içerir.
- Tezcan, Asuman
  - 1980 Sonrası Toplumsal Değişimin Orhan Pamuk'un Romanlarına Yansıması, Yüksek Lisans Tezi, Gazi Üniversitesi, Sosyal Bilimler Enstitüsü, Gazetecelik Anabilim Dalı. Tez No: 62869.
    - Not: Hem Sessiz Ev, hem öteki Orhan Pamuk romanlarının tarihsel, toplumsal, yazınsal art alanını genel çizgileriyle vermesi açısından son derece yararlı bir çalışma.
    - → Yüksek Öğretim Kurulu Ulusal Tez Merkezi adresinden PDF dosyasına ulaşılabilir.
- Uğurlu, A. Ayşegül
  - Orhan Pamuk Romanında Atmosfer, Yüksek Lisans Tezi, İstanbul Teknik Üniversitesi, Fen Bilimleri Enstitüsü, Mimarlık Anabilim Dalı. Tez No: 142641.
    - Not: Doğrudan Sessiz Ev üzerine olmamakla birlikte, son derece yararlı ve özenli hazırlanmış bir çalışma.
    - → Yüksek Öğretim Kurulu Ulusal Tez Merkezi adresinden PDF dosyasına ulaşılabilir.
