= Snow (Pamuk novel) =

2002 novel by Orhan Pamuk

- First edition (Turkish)
- Author: Orhan Pamuk
- Original title: Kar
- Translator: Maureen Freely
- Language: Turkish
- Publisher: İletişim
- Publication date: 2002
- Publication place: Turkey
- English publication date: 2004, Faber and Faber
- Media type: Print (hardback & paperback)
- Pages: 426 pp.
- ISBN: 0-375-70686-0 (United States ed.)
- OCLC: 61119056

Snow (Turkish: Kar) is a novel by Turkish writer Orhan Pamuk. It was originally published in Turkish in 2002, followed by an English translation by Maureen Freely that was published in 2004. The story encapsulates many of the political and cultural tensions of modern Turkey, including a real suicide epidemic among teenage girls, which took place in the city of Kars.

== Plot summary ==
Ka is a poet, who returns to Turkey after 12 years of political exile in Germany. In the town of Kars, he reunites with a woman named İpek, whom he once had feelings for, whose father runs the hotel he is staying in. The snow ("Kar" in Turkish) has been falling as Ka enters the town, and soon all the roads out of town are blocked. In a café, Ka and İpek witness the shooting of the local Director of the Institute of Education by a Muslim extremist from out of town.

Ka visits Muhtar, İpek's ex-husband, who tells him about his experience of finding Islam, and how he got into politics. He is the current candidate running with the Islamist Prosperity Party in the municipal elections. The police pick up Ka and Muhtar as part of their investigation of the Director's murder. Ka is questioned and Muhtar is beaten.

Though he has suffered from writer's block for a number of years, Ka feels inspired and composes a poem called "Snow", which describes a mystic experience. Other poems follow. Orhan Pamuk appears in the novel as a friend of Ka who is attempting to locate this collection of poems after Ka's death. In his research, he retraces Ka's steps in Frankfurt and Kars, four years after the events of the novel.

Ka is brought to a secret location to meet with "Blue" (named "Lacivert" in the Turkish original, meaning an indigo or navy shade), a charismatic Islamist with a fearsome reputation as a terrorist who Ka alternatively admires and fears. One of Blue's followers, Necip, is a student at the religious high school. Necip and his friends ask Ka about his atheism, and Necip's earnestness and good-heartedness endear him to Ka. Necip's Islam-influenced science fiction stories inspire more of Ka's poems, one of which he reads out at the National Theatre.

After his recitation, a play named "My Fatherland or My Headscarf" is acted out by Sunay Zaim, Funda Eser and their troupe of actors. When this play angers the Islamists who attend the event in protest, soldiers take the stage and fire into the audience, killing several people including Necip. Sunay Zaim launches a coup, declaring martial law.

İpek insists that she will not sleep with Ka while her father is under the same roof—an impossible condition, as Turgut Bey never leaves the hotel. Seizing an opportunity, Ka meets with Blue and Kadife (İpek's sister), pretending to represent a German magazine interested in publishing a statement by the Islamists against the massacre and coup, and convinces them to arrange a meeting of politically conscious citizens—including Turgut Bey—where they can come up with a statement for the German magazine. The meeting showcases the differences between the various groups in Kars, while Ka is finally able to sleep with İpek.

As the isolation of Kars has enabled Sunay Zaim to become a revolutionary dictator in real life as well as on the stage, Ka is taken to meet with him. He negotiates a deal that will result in Blue's release, as long as Kadife agrees to play a role in Zaim's production of Thomas Kyd's The Spanish Tragedy and removes her head-scarf on live television during the show.

As the snow melts and the roads out of town reopen, Ka's actions after leaving the theater remain a mystery that is never completely untangled. Pamuk is, however, able to establish that Ka was taken by the military to the train station and put on the first train out of town. Ka attempts to send for İpek, as she had agreed to move to Frankfurt with him. However, as she makes her farewells to her father, news arrives that Blue has been killed. İpek is shattered and blames Ka for leading the police to Blue's hideout.

In the end it is disclosed that a new group of Islamic militants was formed by younger followers of Blue who had been forced into exile in Germany and based themselves in Berlin, vowing to take revenge for the death of their admired leader. It is assumed that one of them assassinated Ka and took away the only extant copy of the poems he had written.

== Translations ==
- 2019, Pakistan, Jumhoori Publications (ISBN 9789696521525), hardback, Translated into Urdu by Huma Anwar.

== Awards and prizes ==
- 2005 – Prix Médicis étranger
- 2005 – shortlist of Independent Foreign Fiction Prize
- 2006 – Prix Méditerranée Étranger

== See also ==
- Headscarf controversy in Turkey
- Secularism in Turkey
- Islam in Turkey
- Ka-Mer, a Turkish women's group
