= Mehmet Eroğlu =

Turkish novelist (born 1948)

Mehmet Eroğlu (born 2 October 1948) is a Turkish novelist. His most known work is Issızlığın Ortasında ("In the Midst of Solitude").

== Life ==
He was born on 2 August 1948 in İzmir. In 1971, he graduated from the Department of Civil Engineering at the Middle East Technical University. He then worked as a civil engineer at the Turkish General Directorate of State Hydraulic Works, the Tourism Bank and at a private company.

He shared the first award at the Milliyet Novel Contest (of the Milliyet news paper) in 1978 with Orhan Pamuk, with his novel Issızlığın Ortasında (In the Midst of Solitude). He also collected the Madaralı Novel Award in 1985 with the same work and the Orhan Kemal Novel Award in 1985 with Geç Kalmış Ölü (The Delayed Dead), which was a continuation of the previous book. His work reflects various situations of humanity by creating anti-heroes, while also not concealing his political point of view.

== Works ==
Novels:

Issızlığın Ortasında (In the Midst of Isolation, 1984)

Geç Kalmış Ölü (The Delayed Dead, 1985)

Yarım Kalan Yürüyüş (The March Interrupted, 1986)

Adını Unutan Adam (The Man Who Forgot His Name, 1989)

Yürek Sürgünü (Exile of Heart, 1994)

Zamanın Manzarası (View of Time, 2002)

Kusma Kulübü (Vomit Club, 2004).
