= Orhan Pamuk =

Turkish novelist, academic and Nobel laureate (born 1952)

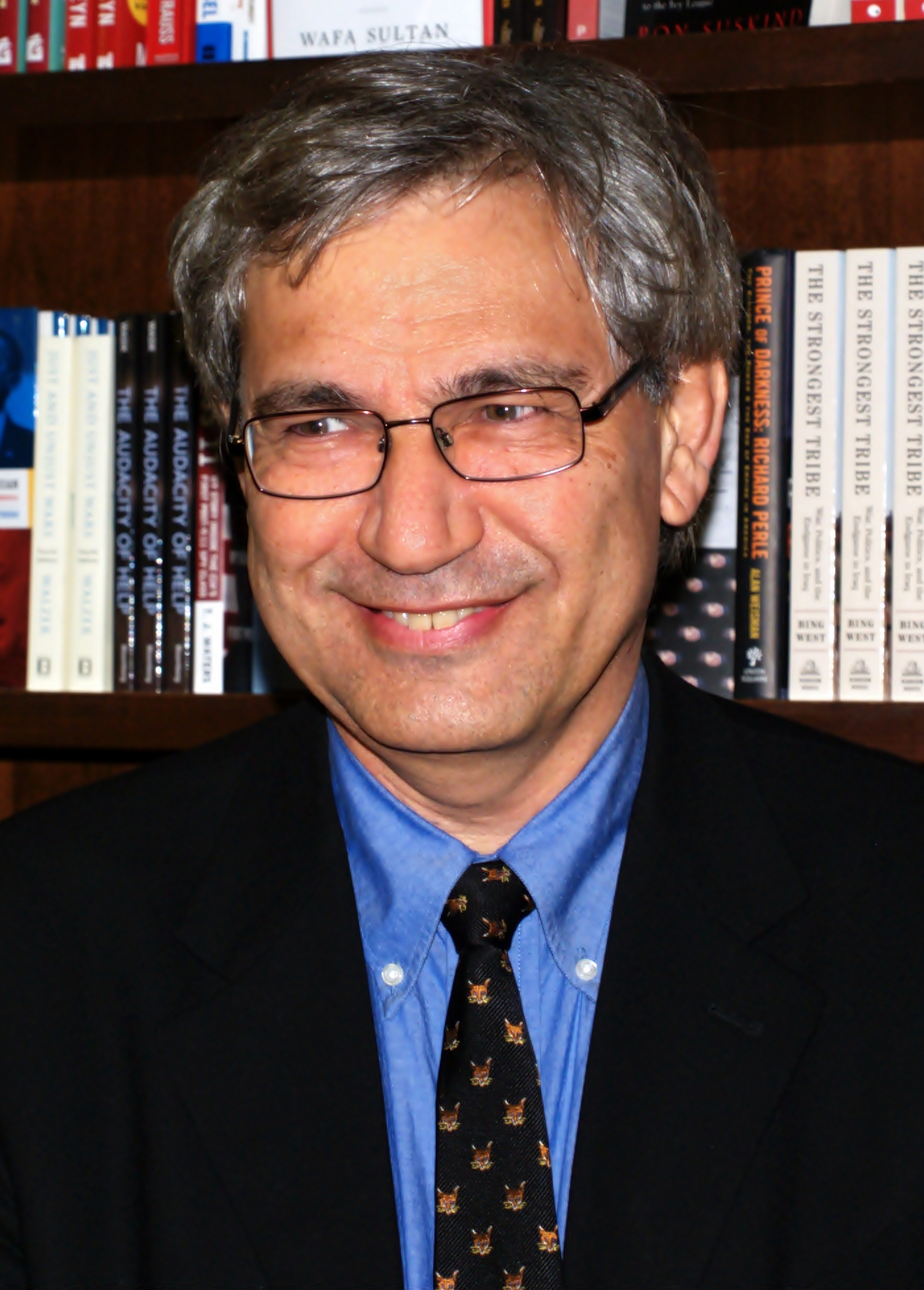
- Pamuk in 2009
- Born: Ferit Orhan Pamuk; 7 June 1952 (age 74); Istanbul, Turkey
- Education: Robert College; Istanbul University
- Occupations: Novelist, screenwriter, academic
- Spouses: Aylin Türegün (m. 1982; div. 2002) Aslı Akyavaş (m. 2022)
- Children: 1
- Writing career
- Language: Turkish
- Website: www.orhanpamuk.net

Ferit Orhan Pamuk (born 7 June 1952; Turkish pronunciation: [feˈɾit oɾˈhan paˈmuk]) is a Turkish novelist, screenwriter, academic, and recipient of the 2006 Nobel Prize in Literature. One of Turkey's most prominent novelists, he has sold over 13 million books in 63 languages, making him the country's best-selling writer.

Pamuk's novels include Silent House, The White Castle, The Black Book, The New Life, My Name Is Red and Snow. He is the Robert Yik-Fong Tam Professor in the Humanities at Columbia University, where he teaches writing and comparative literature. He was elected to the American Philosophical Society in 2018.

Born in Istanbul, Pamuk is the first Turkish Nobel laureate. He has also received many other literary awards. My Name Is Red won the 2002 Prix du Meilleur Livre Étranger, the 2002 Premio Grinzane Cavour, and the 2003 International Dublin Literary Award.

The European Writers' Parliament came about as a result of a joint proposal by Pamuk and José Saramago. Pamuk's willingness to write books about contentious historical and political events put him at risk of censure in his homeland. In 2005, a lawyer sued him over a statement acknowledging the Armenian genocide in the Ottoman Empire. Pamuk said his intention had been to highlight issues of freedom of speech in Turkey. The court initially declined to hear the case, but in 2011 Pamuk was ordered to pay 6,000 liras in compensation for having insulted the plaintiffs' honor.

== Early life ==
Pamuk was born in Istanbul, in 1952, and grew up in a wealthy but declining upper-class family, an experience he describes in passing in his novels The Black Book and Cevdet Bey and His Sons, as well as more thoroughly in his personal memoir Istanbul: Memories and the City. Pamuk's paternal grandmother was Circassian. He was educated at Robert College secondary school in Istanbul and studied architecture at the Istanbul Technical University, a subject related to his dream career, painting. He left architecture school after three years to become a full-time writer, and graduated from the Institute of Journalism at the University of Istanbul in 1976. From ages 22 to 30, Pamuk lived with his mother, writing his first novel and attempting to find a publisher. He describes himself as a Cultural Muslim who identifies with Islam historically and culturally while not believing in a personal connection to God.

== Work ==
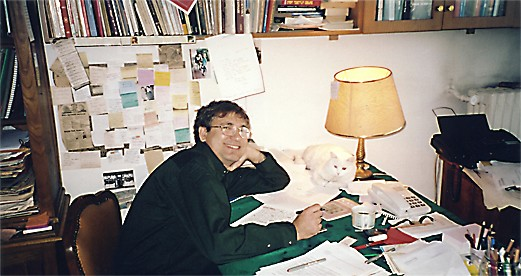
Pamuk and his Turkish Angora cat at his personal writing space

Pamuk started writing regularly in 1974. His first novel, Karanlık ve Işık (Darkness and Light) was a co-winner of the 1979 Milliyet Press Novel Contest (Mehmet Eroğlu was the other winner). This novel was published with the title Cevdet Bey ve Oğulları (Mr. Cevdet and His Sons) in 1982 and won the Orhan Kemal Novel Prize in 1983. It tells the story of three generations of a wealthy Istanbul family living in Nişantaşı, the district of Istanbul where Pamuk grew up.

Pamuk won a number of critical prizes for his early work, including the 1984 Madarali Novel Prize for his second novel Sessiz Ev (Silent House) and the 1991 Prix de la Découverte Européenne for its French translation. His historical novel Beyaz Kale (The White Castle), published in Turkish in 1985, won the 1990 Independent Award for Foreign Fiction and extended his reputation abroad. On 19 May 1991, The New York Times Book Review wrote, "A new star has risen in the east—Orhan Pamuk." He started experimenting with postmodern techniques in his novels, a change from his early works' strict naturalism.

Popular success took a bit longer, but his 1990 novel Kara Kitap (The Black Book) became one of the most controversial and popular books in Turkish literature, due to its complexity and richness. In 1992, he wrote the screenplay for the movie Gizli Yüz (Secret Face), based on Kara Kitap and directed by a prominent Turkish director, Ömer Kavur. Pamuk's fifth novel, Yeni Hayat (New Life), caused a sensation in Turkey upon its 1994 publication and became the fastest-selling book in Turkish history. By this time, Pamuk had also become a high-profile figure in Turkey due to his support for Kurdish political rights. In 1995, he was among a group of authors tried for writing essays that criticized Turkey's treatment of the Kurds. In 1999, Pamuk published his book of essays Öteki Renkler (Other Colors).

In 2019, the 66-year-old Nobel laureate held an exhibition of his photographs of Istanbul taken from his own balcony, "Balkon: Photos by Orhan Pamuk". It captured the "subtle and ever-changing view of Istanbul" photographed by Pamuk from his balcony using a telephoto lens. Curated by Gerhard Steidl, the German publisher of his photo book Balkon, the exhibition ran for three months at the Yapı Kredi Culture and Arts building on Istanbul's Istiklal Street. It featured more than 600 colour photos selected from over 8,500 Pamuk took over a five-month period in late 2012 and early 2013, in what the gallery called "a period of intense creativity".

=== My Name Is Red ===
Pamuk's international reputation continued to increase when he published Benim Adım Kırmızı (My Name is Red) in 1998. The novel blends mystery, romance, and philosophical puzzles in a setting of 16th-century Istanbul. It opens a window into the reign of Ottoman Sultan Murat III in nine snowy winter days of 1591, inviting the reader to experience the tension between East and West from a breathlessly urgent perspective. My Name Is Red has been translated into 24 languages and in 2003 won the International Dublin Literary Award, one of the world's most lucrative literary prizes.

Asked what impact winning this last award (currently $127,000) had on his life and work, Pamuk replied:

Nothing changed in my life since I work all the time. I've spent 30 years writing fiction. For the first 10 years, I worried about money and no one asked how much money I made. The second decade I spent money and no one was asking about that. And I've spent the last 10 years with everyone expecting to hear how I spend the money, which I will not do.

=== Snow ===
Pamuk followed this with the novel Kar, published in 2002 (English translation: Snow, 2004). Set in the border city of Kars, it explores the conflict between Islamism and Westernism in modern Turkey. Snow follows Ka, an expatriate Turkish poet, as he wanders around the snowy Kars and gets caught up in the muddle of aimless Islamists, MPs, headscarf advocates, secularists, and a number of factions who die and kill in the name of highly contradictory ideals. The New York Times listed Snow as one of its Ten Best Books of 2004.

In a conversation with Carol Becker in the Brooklyn Rail about creating sympathetic characters in the political novel, Pamuk said:

I strongly feel that the art of the novel is based on the human capacity, though it’s a limited capacity, to be able to identify with "the other". Only human beings can do this. It requires imagination, a sort of morality, a self-imposed goal of understanding this person who is different from us, which is a rarity.

=== The Museum of Innocence ===
In May 2007, Pamuk was among the jury members at the Cannes Film Festival headed by British director Stephen Frears. He completed his next novel, Masumiyet Müzesi (The Museum of Innocence) in the summer of 2008 - the first novel he published after receiving the 2006 Nobel Prize in Literature.

Pamuk created an actual Museum of Innocence, consisting of everyday objects tied to the narrative, and housed them at an Istanbul house he purchased. Pamuk collaborated on a documentary "The Innocence of Memories" that expanded on his Museum of Innocence. Pamuk stated that "(Museum of Dreams will) tell a different version of the love story set in Istanbul through objects and Grant Gee’s wonderful new film". In both Snow and the Museum of Innocence Pamuk describes tragic love-stories, where men fall in love with beautiful women at first sight. Pamuk's heroes tend to be educated men who fall tragically in love with beauties, but who seem doomed to a decrepit loneliness.

In 2013, Pamuk invited Grazia Toderi, whose work he admired, to design a work for the Museum of Innocence in Istanbul. Their collaboration culminated in the exhibition Words and Stars. Words and Stars opened on 2 April 2017, at the MART (Museo di Arte Moderna e Contemporanea di Trento e Rovereto), and which explores "the inclination of man to explore space and innate vocation to question the stars." The show was curated by Gianfranco Maraniello. It also showed from 4 November 2016 to 29 March 2017 from 5–6 November 2016 at the Palazzo Madama, Piazza Castello, Turin, and at Infini-to, the Planetarium of Turin (Infini.to - Planetario di Torino, Museo dell'Astronomia e dello Spazio) by invitation.

In 2026, a series based on the novel The Museum of Innocence was released on Netflix. Pamuk stars as himself, and some scenes were filmed at the Museum of Innocence.

=== Non-fiction ===
Pamuk published the memoir/travelogue Istanbul—Hatıralar ve Şehir in 2003 (English version, Istanbul—Memories and the City, 2005). Pamuk's Other Colours—a collection of nonfiction and a story—was published in the UK in September 2007.

Asked how personal his book Istanbul: Memories and the City was, Pamuk replied:

I thought I would write Memories and the City in six months, but it took me one year to complete. And I was working twelve hours a day, just reading and working. My life, because of so many things, was in a crisis; I don’t want to go into those details: divorce, father dying, professional problems, problems with this, problems with that, everything was bad. I thought if I were to be weak I would have a depression. But every day I would wake up and have a cold shower and sit down and remember and write, always paying attention to the beauty of the book. Honestly, I may have hurt my mother, my family. My father was dead, but my mother is still alive. But I can’t care about that; I must care about the beauty of the book.

== Style ==
Pamuk's books are characterized by a confusion or loss of identity brought on in part by the conflict between Western and Eastern values. They are often disturbing or unsettling, and include complex plots and characters. His works are also redolent with discussion of and fascination with the creative arts, such as literature and painting. Pamuk's work often touches on the deep-rooted tensions between East and West and tradition and modernism/secularism.

Pamuk speaks about "the angel of inspiration" when he discusses his creativity:

"I am just listening to an inner music, the mystery of which I don't completely know. And I don't want to know."

"I am most surprised by those moments when I have felt as if the sentences, dreams, and pages that have made me so ecstatically happy have not come from my own imagination – that another power has found them and generously presented them to me."

A group of writers assert that some parts of Pamuk's works are heavily influenced by the works of other writers, and some chapters are almost totally quoted from other books. Pamuk himself said that his works have been inspired by the writings of rebel poet Kazi Nazrul Islam. One of the writers, nationalist popular historian Murat Bardakçı, accused him of counterfeiting and plagiarism in the Hurriyet, a Turkish newspaper. Another accusation is that Pamuk's novel The White Castle contains exact paragraphs from Fuad Carim's Kanuni Devrinde İstanbul ("Istanbul in the Time of the Kanuni") novel. After a question raised at the 2009 Boston Book Festival as to whether he wanted to respond to these accusations, Pamuk responded, "No I do not. Next question?". However, many attributed such accusations to their ignorance about postmodern literature, and the literary technique of intertextuality which Pamuk almost always uses in his novels in full disclosure.

== Personal life ==
Pamuk's elder brother Şevket Pamuk, who sometimes appears as a fictionalized character in his works, is a professor of economics internationally recognised for his work in economic history of the Ottoman Empire, working at Boğaziçi University in Istanbul. Pamuk also has a younger half-sister, Hümeyra Pamuk, who is a journalist.

On 1 March 1982, Pamuk married historian Aylin Türegün. From 1985 to 1988, while she was a graduate student at Columbia University, Pamuk assumed the position of visiting scholar there, using the time to conduct research and write his novel The Black Book at the university's Butler Library. This period also included a visiting fellowship at the University of Iowa. Pamuk returned to Istanbul, a city to which he is strongly attached. In 1991 he and his wife had a daughter, Rüya, whose name means "dream" in Turkish, and to whom his novel My Name is Red is dedicated. In 2002, they were divorced.

In 2006, Pamuk returned to the U.S. to take a position as a visiting professor at Columbia, where he was a Fellow with Columbia's Committee on Global Thought and held an appointment in Columbia's Middle East and Asian Languages and Cultures department and at its School of the Arts. In the 2007–08 academic year Pamuk returned to Columbia to jointly teach comparative literature classes with Andreas Huyssen and David Damrosch. Pamuk was also a writer-in-residence at Bard College. In 2009, he was Harvard's Charles Eliot Norton Lecturer, delivering a series of lectures titled "The Naive and Sentimental Novelist".

Orhan publicly acknowledged his relationship with the writer Kiran Desai. In January 2011, Turkish-Armenian artist Karolin Fişekçi told Hürriyet Daily News that Pamuk had a two-and-a-half-year relationship with her during the same time (2010–12), which Pamuk expressly denied.

Since 2011 he has been in a relationship with Aslı Akyavaş, whom he married in 2022.

== Trial ==
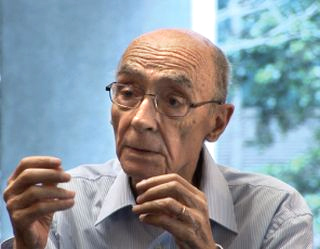
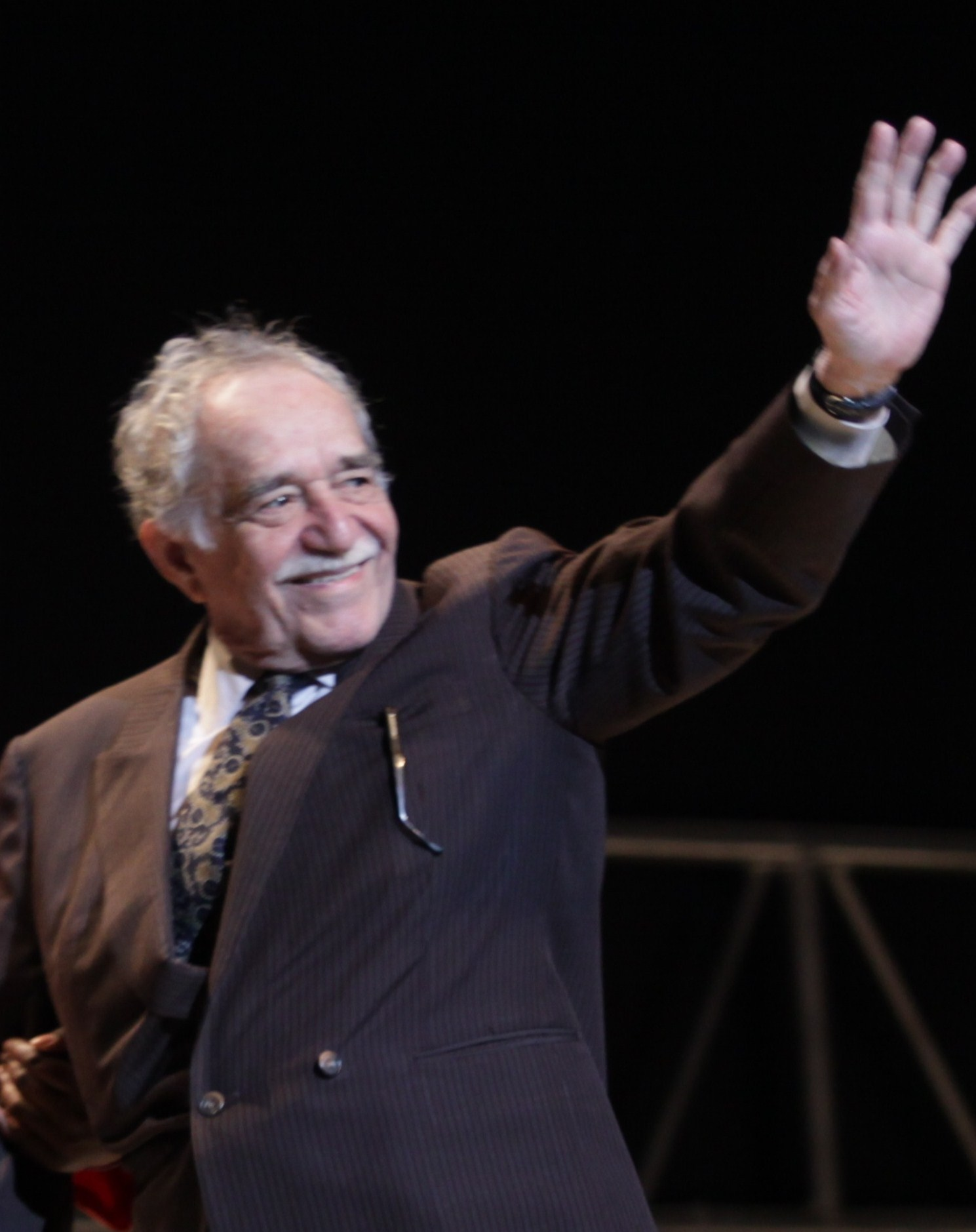
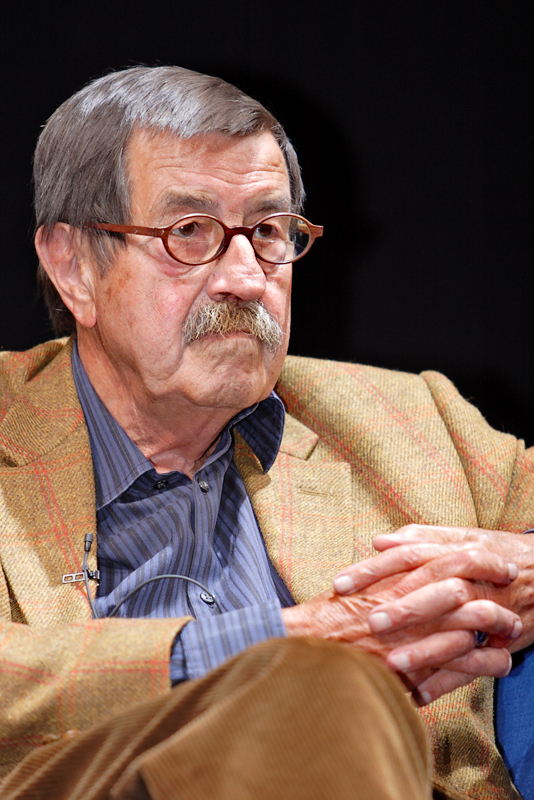
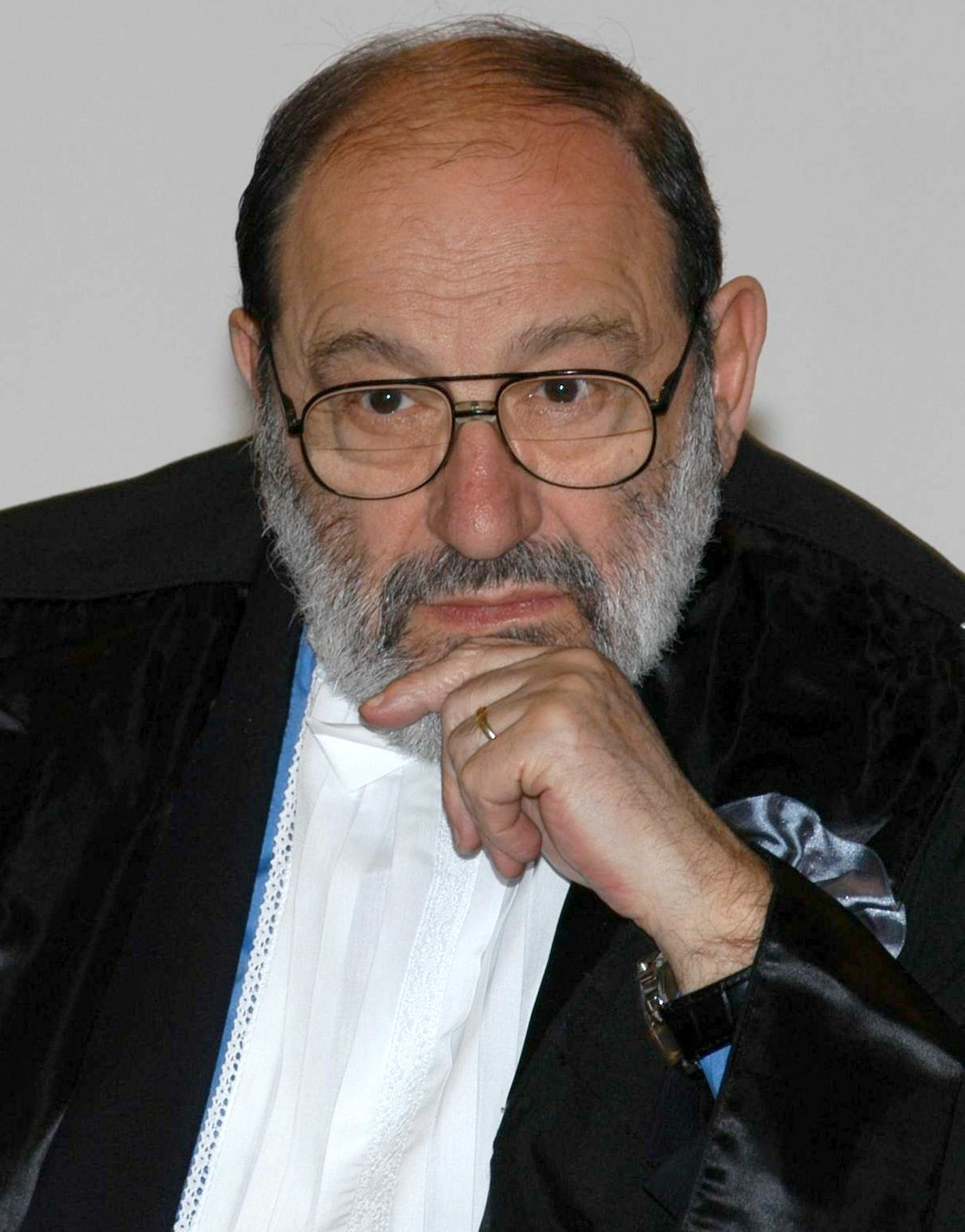
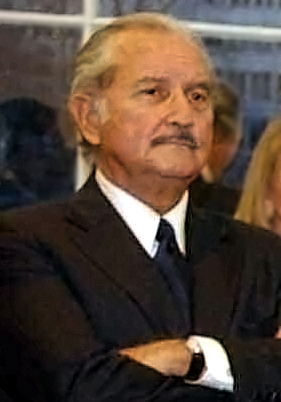
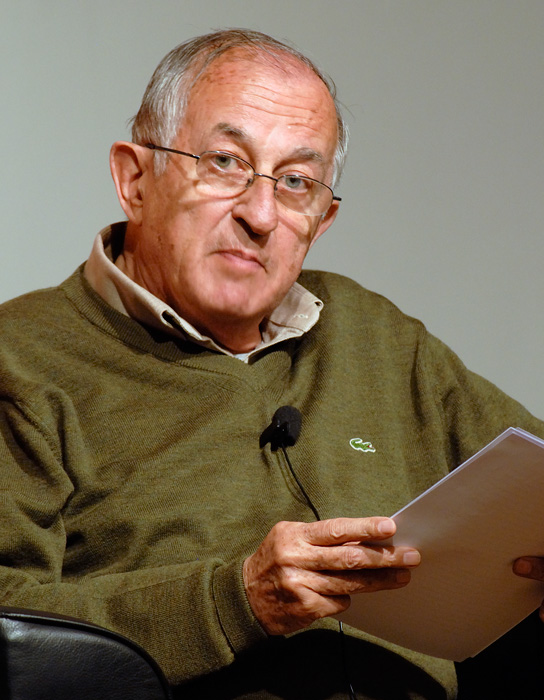
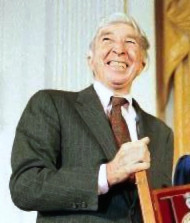

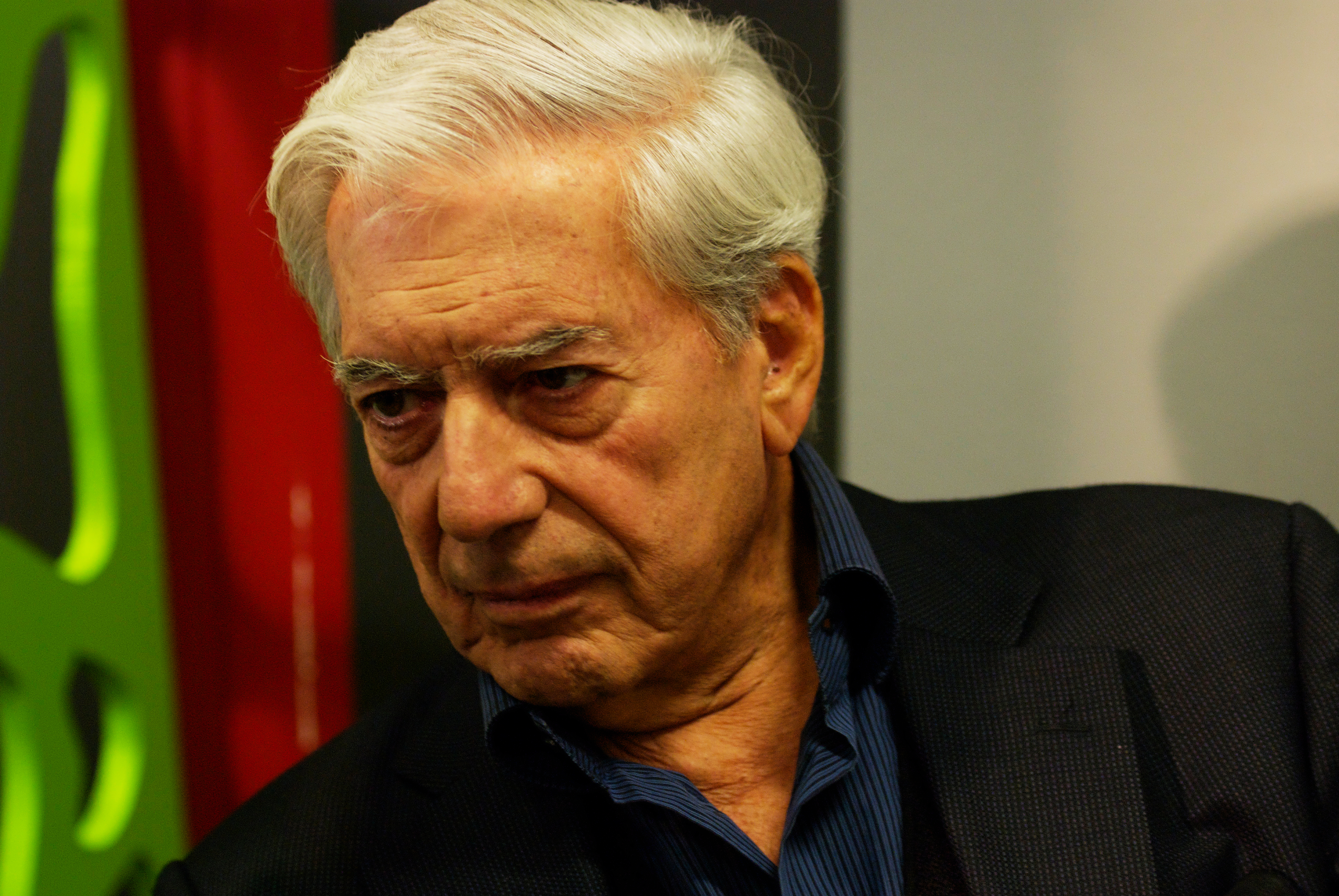
José Saramago, Gabriel García Márquez, Günter Grass, Umberto Eco, Carlos Fuentes, Juan Goytisolo, John Updike and Mario Vargas Llosa issued a joint statement in support of Pamuk when he was put on trial in Turkey.

In 2005, after Pamuk made a statement about the Armenian genocide and mass killings of Kurds, a criminal case was opened against him based on a complaint filed by lawyer Kemal Kerinçsiz. The charges were dropped on 22 January 2006. In Bilecik, his books were burned in a nationalist rally. Pamuk subsequently said his intent was to draw attention to freedom of speech issues. Kerinçsiz appealed to the Supreme Court of Appeal, which ordered the court in Şişli to reopen the case. On 27 March 2011, Pamuk was found guilty and ordered to pay 6,000 liras in compensation to five people for, among other things, having insulted their honour.

=== Pamuk's statements ===
The criminal charges against Pamuk resulted from remarks he made during an interview in February 2005 with the Swiss publication Das Magazin, a weekly supplement to a number of Swiss daily newspapers: the Tages-Anzeiger, the Basler Zeitung, the Berner Zeitung and the Solothurner Tagblatt. In the interview, Pamuk said, "Thirty thousand Kurds have been killed here, and a million Armenians. And almost nobody dares to mention that. So I do." Turkish historians were divided over the remarks.

Pamuk said he was consequently subjected to a hate campaign that forced him to flee the country. He returned later in 2005 to face the charges against him. In an interview with BBC News, he said that he wanted to defend freedom of speech, which was Turkey's only hope for coming to terms with its history: "What happened to the Ottoman Armenians in 1915 was a major thing that was hidden from the Turkish nation; it was a taboo. But we have to be able to talk about the past." But when CNN TURK asked Pamuk about his speech, he admitted that he said that "Armenians were killed" but he denied that he said "Turks killed Armenians", and estimated the number of deaths as 1 million in that speech.

=== Prosecution ===
At the time, Article 301 of the Turkish Penal Code stated: "A person who publicly insults the Republic or Turkish Grand National Assembly, shall be punishable by imprisonment of between six months to three years." Pamuk was charged with violating this law in the interview. In October, after the prosecution had begun, Pamuk reiterated his views in a speech given during an award ceremony in Germany: "I repeat, I said loud and clear that one million Armenians and 30,000 Kurds were killed in Turkey."

Article 301's old form before 2005 (and also the new form after the amendments in 2008) required that prosecution under the article needs to be approved by the Ministry of Justice. A few minutes after Pamuk's trial started on 16 December, the judge found that this approval had not yet been received and suspended the proceedings. In an interview published in the Akşam newspaper the same day, then Justice Minister Cemil Çiçek said he had not yet received Pamuk's file but would study it thoroughly once it came.

On 29 December 2005, Turkish state prosecutors dropped the charge that Pamuk insulted Turkey's armed forces, although the charge of "insulting Turkishness" remained.

=== International reaction ===
The charges against Pamuk caused an international outcry and led to questions in some circles about Turkey's proposed entry into the European Union. On 30 November, the European Parliament announced that it would send a delegation of five MEPs led by Camiel Eurlings, to observe the trial. EU Enlargement Commissioner Olli Rehn subsequently stated that the Pamuk case would be a "litmus test" of Turkey's commitment to the EU's membership criteria.

On 15 November, British members of parliament criticised the charges against Pamuk.

On 1 December, Amnesty International released a statement calling for Article 301 to be repealed and for Pamuk and six other people awaiting trial under the act to be freed. PEN American Center also denounced the charges against Pamuk, stating: "PEN finds it extraordinary that a state that has ratified both the United Nations International Covenant on Civil and Political Rights, and the European Convention on Human Rights, both of which see freedom of expression as central, should have a Penal Code that includes a clause that is so clearly contrary to these very same principles."

On 13 December, eight world-renowned authors—José Saramago, Gabriel García Márquez, Günter Grass, Umberto Eco, Carlos Fuentes, Juan Goytisolo, John Updike and Mario Vargas Llosa—issued a joint statement supporting Pamuk and decrying the charges against him as a violation of human rights.

In 2008, in an open online poll, Pamuk was voted as the fourth most intellectual person in the world on the list of Top 100 Public Intellectuals by Prospect (United Kingdom) and Foreign Policy (United States).

=== Charges dropped ===
On 22 January 2006, Turkey's Justice Ministry refused to issue an approval of the prosecution, saying that they had no authority to open a case against Pamuk under the new penal code. With the trial in the local court, it was ruled the next day that the case could not continue without Justice Ministry approval. Pamuk's lawyer, Haluk İnanıcı, subsequently confirmed that the charges had been dropped.

The announcement occurred in a week when the EU was scheduled to begin a review of the Turkish justice system.

=== Interplay ===
EU enlargement commissioner Olli Rehn welcomed the dropping of charges, saying, "This is obviously good news for Mr. Pamuk, but it's also good news for freedom of expression in Turkey". But some EU representatives expressed disappointment that the justice ministry had rejected the prosecution on a technicality rather than on principle. An Ankara-based EU diplomat reportedly said, "It is good the case has apparently been dropped, but the justice ministry never took a clear position or gave any sign of trying to defend Pamuk". Meanwhile, the lawyer who had led the effort to try Pamuk, Kemal Kerinçsiz, said he would appeal the decision, saying, "Orhan Pamuk must be punished for insulting Turkey and Turkishness, it is a grave crime and it should not be left unpunished."

In 2006, the magazine Time listed Pamuk in the cover article "TIME 100: The People Who Shape Our World", in the category "Heroes & Pioneers", for speaking up.

In April 2006, on the BBC's HARDtalk program, Pamuk stated that his remarks regarding the Armenian genocide were meant to draw attention to freedom of expression issues in Turkey rather than to the massacres themselves.

On 19–20 December 2006, a symposium on Orhan Pamuk and His Work was held at Sabancı University, Istanbul. Pamuk himself gave the closing address.

In January 2008, Turkish authorities arrested 13 ultranationalists, including Kerinçsiz, for participating in a Turkish nationalist underground organisation, Ergenekon, allegedly conspiring to assassinate political figures, including several Christian missionaries and Armenian intellectual Hrant Dink. Several reports suggest that Pamuk was among the figures this group plotted to kill. The police informed Pamuk about the assassination plans eight months before the Ergenekon investigation.

== Awards and honours ==
- 1979 Milliyet Press Novel Contest Award (Turkey) for his novel Karanlık ve Işık (co-winner)
- 1983 Orhan Kemal Novel Prize (Turkey) for his novel Cevdet Bey ve Oğulları
- 1984 Madarali Novel Prize (Turkey) for his novel Sessiz Ev
- 1990 Independent Foreign Fiction Prize (United Kingdom) for his novel Beyaz Kale
- 1991 Prix de la Découverte Européenne (France) for the French edition of Sessiz Ev: La Maison de Silence
- 1991 Antalya Golden Orange Film Festival (Turkey) Best Original Screenplay Gizli Yüz
- 1995 Prix France Culture (France) for his novel Kara Kitap: Le Livre Noir
- 2002 Prix du Meilleur Livre Etranger (France) for his novel My Name Is Red: Mon Nom est Rouge
- 2002 Premio Grinzane Cavour (Italy) for his novel My Name Is Red
- 2003 International Dublin Literary Award (Ireland) for his novel My Name Is Red (awarded jointly with translator Erdağ M. Göknar)
- 2005 Peace Prize of the German Book Trade (Germany)
- 2005 Prix Médicis étranger (France) for his novel Snow: La Neige
- 2006 Nobel Prize in Literature (Sweden)
- 2006 Washington University in St. Louis's Distinguished Humanist Award (United States)
- 2006 Ordre des Arts et des Lettres (France)
- 2008 Ovidius Prize (Romania)
- 2010 Norman Mailer Prize, Lifetime Achievement (USA)
- 2012 Sonning Prize (Denmark)
- 2012 Légion d'honneur Officier (France)
- 2014 The Mary Lynn Kotz Award (USA) for his book "The Innocence of Objects"
- 2014 Tabernakul Prize (Macedonia)
- 2014 European Museum of the Year Award (Estonia)
- 2014 Helena Vaz da Silva European Award for Public Awareness on Cultural Heritage (Portugal)
- 2015 Erdal Öz Prize (Turkey), for his novel A Strangeness in My Mind
- 2015 Aydın Doğan Foundation Award (Turkey), for his novel A Strangeness in My Mind
- 2016 The Yasnaya Polyana Literary Award ("Foreign Literature" category, Russia) for his novel A Strangeness in My Mind
- 2016 Milovan Vidaković Prize in Novi Sad (Serbia)
- 2017 Budapest Grand Prize (Hungary)
- 2017 Literary Flame Prize (Montenegro)
- 2019 Golden Plate Award of the American Academy of Achievement

=== Doctorates, honoris causa ===
- 2007 Free University of Berlin, Department of Philosophy and Humanities – 4 May 2007
- 2007 Tilburg University – 15 November 2007
- 2007 Boğaziçi University, Department of Turkish Language and Literature – 14 May 2007
- 2007 Georgetown University's Honorary Degree: Doctor of Humane Letters honoris causa
- 2007 Complutense University of Madrid
- 2008 University of Florence
- 2008 American University of Beirut
- 2009 University of Rouen
- 2010 University of Tirana
- 2010 Yale University
- 2011 Sofia University
- 2017 Brera Academy (Italia)
- 2017 St. Petersburg State University
- 2018 University of Crete
- 2023 Paris Nanterre University
- 2023 Adam Mickiewicz University in Poznań, Poland

=== Honours ===
- 2005 Honorary Member of American Academy of Arts and Letters (USA)
- 2008 Honorary Member of Social Sciences of Chinese Academy (China)
- 2008 Honorary Member of American Academy of Arts and Sciences (USA)

In 2005, Pamuk received the €25,000 Peace Prize of the German Book Trade for his literary work, in which "Europe and Islamic Turkey find a place for one another." The award presentation was held at Paul's Church, Frankfurt.

== Bibliography ==
=== Novels (English) ===
All the novels except Cevdet Bey and his Sons have been translated into English.

- The White Castle, translated by Victoria Holbrook, Manchester (England): Carcanet Press Limited, 1990; 1991; New York: George Braziller, 1991 [original title: Beyaz Kale]. Set in the 17th century with a Preface set in 1985.
- The Black Book, translated by Güneli Gün, New York: Farrar, Straus & Giroux, 1994 [original title: Kara Kitap]. (A new translation by Maureen Freely was published in 2006). Set in 1980s.
- The New Life, translated by Güneli Gün, New York: Farrar, Straus & Giroux, 1997 [original title: Yeni Hayat]. Set in the early 1990s.
- My Name Is Red, translated by Erdağ M. Göknar, New York: Alfred A. Knopf, 2001 [original title: Benim Adım Kırmızı]. Set in 1591.
- Snow, translated by Maureen Freely, New York: Alfred A. Knopf, 2004 [original title: Kar]. Set in the early 1990s.
- The Museum of Innocence, translated by Maureen Freely, New York: Alfred A. Knopf, was released on 20 October 2009 [original title: Masumiyet Müzesi]. Set in 1975-84.
- Silent House, translated by Robert Finn, New York: Alfred A. Knopf, 2012 [original title: Sessiz Ev]. Set in July 1980.
- A Strangeness in My Mind, translated by Ekin Oklap, New York: Alfred A. Knopf, 2015 [original title: Kafamda Bir Tuhaflık]. Set in 1969-2012.
- The Red-Haired Woman, translated by Ekin Oklap, New York: Alfred A. Knopf, 2017 [original title: Kırmızı saçlı kadın]. Set in 1980.
- Nights of Plague, translated by Ekin Oklap, London: Faber & Faber, 2022 [original title: Veba Geceleri]. Set in 1901 in the fictional island of Mingheria.

==== Untranslated ====
- Cevdet Bey ve Oğulları or Karanlık ve Işık (Cevdet Bey and his Sons or Darkness and Light) Istanbul: Karacan Yayınları (1982). Set in 1905-70.

=== Short Story ===
- "To Look Out the Window" in Other Colours: Essays and a Story, translated by Maureen Freely, New York: Alfred A. Knopf, 2007 [original title: Öteki Renkler]. Set in early 1960s.

=== Non-fiction (English) ===
- Istanbul: Memories and the City, translated by Maureen Freely, New York: Alfred A. Knopf, 2005 [original title: İstanbul: Hatıralar ve Şehir]
- My Father’s Suitcase [original title: Babamın Bavulu] Nobel lecture
- Other Colors: Essays and a Story, translated by Maureen Freely, New York: Alfred A. Knopf, 2007 [original title: Öteki Renkler]
- The Innocence of Objects [original title: Şeylerin Masumiyeti]
- The Naive and Sentimental Novelist, Harvard University Press, 2010
- Balkon, Steidl Publisher, 2018
- Orange, Steidl Publisher, 2020

=== Turkish ===
==== Novels ====
- Cevdet Bey ve Oğulları (Cevdet Bey and His Sons), novel, Istanbul: Karacan Yayınları, 1982
- Sessiz Ev (Silent House), novel, Istanbul: Can Yayınları, 1983
- Beyaz Kale (The White Castle), novel, Istanbul: Can Yayınları, 1985
- Kara Kitap (The Black Book), novel, Istanbul: Can Yayınları, 1990
- Yeni Hayat (The New Life), novel, Istanbul: İletişim Yayınları, 1994
- Benim Adım Kırmızı (My Name is Red), novel, Istanbul: İletişim Yayınları, 1998
- Kar (Snow), novel, Istanbul: İletişim Yayınları, 2002
- Masumiyet Müzesi (The Museum of Innocence), novel, Istanbul: İletişim Yayınları, 2008
- Kafamda Bir Tuhaflık (A Strangeness in My Mind), novel, Istanbul: Yapı Kredi Publications, 2014
- Kırmızı Saçlı Kadın, (The Red-Haired Woman), novel, Yapı Kredi Yayınları, 2016
- Veba Geceleri (tr,): "Nights of Plague" (2021)
- Fathers, Mothers and Sons: Cevdet Bey and Sons; The Silent House; The Red-Haired Woman ("Delta" Omnibüs, Novels volume I), Yapı Kredi Yayınları, 2018

==== Other works ====
- Gizli Yüz (Secret Face), screenplay, Istanbul: Can Yayınları, 1992
- Öteki Renkler (Other Colours), essays, Istanbul: İletişim Yayınları, 1999
- İstanbul: Hatıralar ve Şehir (Istanbul: Memories and the City), memoirs, Istanbul: Yapı Kredi Yayınları, 2003
- Babamın Bavulu (My Father's Suitcase), Nobel Söylevi, İstanbul, İletişim Yayınları, 2007
- Manzaradan Parçalar: Hayat, Sokaklar, Edebiyat (Pieces from the View: Life, Streets, Literature), essays, Istanbul: İletişim Yayınları, 2010
- Saf ve Düşünceli Romancı ("Naive and Sentimental Novelist") literary criticism, İstanbul: İletişim Yayınları, 2011
- Şeylerin Masumiyeti (The Innocence of Objects), Masumiyet Müzesi Kataloğu, İletişim Yayınları 2012
- Resimli İstanbul - Hatıralar ve Şehir, memoir, Yapı Kredi Yayınları, 2015
- Hatıraların Masumiyeti, scripts and essays, Yapı Kredi Yayınları, 2016
- Balkon, (Introduction and photographs), Yapı Kredi Yayınları, 2018
- Orange, (Introduction and Photographs), Yapi Kredi Yayınları, 192 pages, 350 images, 2020
- Uzak Dağlar ve Hatıralar Yapi Kredi Yayınları, selections from personal diary and photographs, 2022
