= The Black Book (Pamuk novel) =

1990 novel by Orhan Pamuk

- First edition (Turkish)
- Author: Orhan Pamuk
- Original title: Kara Kitap
- Language: Turkish
- Publisher: Farrar Straus & Giroux
- Publication date: 1990
- Publication place: Turkey
- English publication date: 1994

The Black Book (Kara Kitap in Turkish) is a novel by Turkish writer Orhan Pamuk. It was published in Turkish in 1990 and first translated by Güneli Gün and published in English in 1994, as well as a 2006 translation by Maureen Freely.

== Plot ==
The protagonist, an Istanbul lawyer named Galip, finds one day that his wife Rüya (Turkish for "dream") has mysteriously left him with very little explanation. He wanders around the city looking for his clues to her whereabouts. He suspects she has taken up with her half-brother, a columnist for Milliyet named Celal, who also turns out to be missing. The story of Galip's search is interspersed with reprints of Celal's columns, which are lengthy, literatary meditations on the city and its history. Galip thinks that by living as Celal he can figure out how Celal thinks and locate both him and his wife, so he takes up residence in Celal's apartment, wearing his clothes and eventually writing his column.

Galip starts getting mysterious phone calls from one of Celal's obsessed fans, who displays an astonishing familiarity with the columnist's writings. After Galip's columns under Celal's name start to take the form of impassioned pleas to Rüya, a woman from Celal's past misinterprets the articles and calls Galip, thinking they are actually Celal's attempts to win her back. It turns out that Celal and the woman had an affair, and the fan who is calling Galip is the woman's jealous husband. In an eerie twist, it turns out that the husband has been following Galip around Istanbul in an attempt to find Celal through him, accounting for Galip's frequent apprehension that he is being watched. Galip finally agrees to meet both of them at a public location, a store called Aladdin's that figures in much of the narrative. Soon after, Celal is shot to death in the street. Rüya is found also shot in Aladdin's store. The identity of the killer is never discovered for certain.

The novel ends with the postmodern twist of the author revealing his presence in the narrative. The story is more concerned with exploring the nature of story-telling as a means of constructing identity than with a straightforward plot. As such, it is full of stories within the main story, relating to both Turkey's Ottoman past and contemporary Istanbul.

Pamuk effectively bridges classical Eastern narrative traditions and Western postmodern literature. The novel's intricate structure reflects modern comparative literature, echoing themes of identity crisis and cultural duality through allegory and intertextual allusion. By combining traditional Islamic mysticism, such as Attar's The Conference of the Birds, with 20th-century Western narrative techniques, the text demonstrates a unique synthesis of Eastern philosophical motifs and Western literary realism, making it a pivotal text in Turkish comparative literary studies.

== Interpretation ==
In 1992 Kara Kitap üzerine Yazılar was published as an anthology of critical essays.

The main theme of the novel is identity, and it returns on many levels. Galip for example, is clearly not happy with who he is. He dislikes his life as a lawyer, and has envied the successful Celal for years. The plot shows how he gradually changes his identity to become Celal, living in his flat, wearing his clothes and even writing his columns. We know however, that Celal longs to become someone else as well (this is clearly visible from some of his columns - see for example the one titled 'I Must Be Myself'). Rüya remains quite enigmatic in the novel, the only picture we get of her is through the subjective lens of Galip. She sleeps during the day, and reads detective novels in the evenings and at night, hardly ever leaving the house. It seems that she prefers to escape from reality to the world of her detective novels, although Galip doesn't seem to think much of these. This strange lifestyle can imply that she is also not satisfied with who she is, or how her life turned out, but perhaps she does not consciously think about it, or admit it to herself.

The questions of who we are and whether its possible to change who we are return on at least two other levels: Istanbul's identity as a city, and the identity of the Turkish people. As Galip wanders the streets of Istanbul, we get to know many of the city's different neighborhoods, all with their distinct ambiance. This is a city where East and West, antiquity and the modern, Islam and the secular, the rich and the poor, the pashas and the peasants are all present. The question always lingers: what is the true identity of this city? Is it a modern metropolis, or a dying remnant of the once-great Constantinople?

The questions of Turkish national identity are referenced several times, in relation mainly to the perceived westernization of Turkish society. Should the Turkish people embrace Western (European) culture, or should they remain true to their heritage? Is their culture and identity decaying or only transforming? The novel in many cases implies that embracing the former will destroy not just historical and cultural heritage, but also the Turkish people themselves (see part where Galip takes the tour of the underground mannequin museum). Kemal Atatürk, the founder of the modern Turkish state is seen as a controversial figure. His efforts to westernize Turkey have led to mixed results.
