= My Name Is Red =

1998 Turkish novel by Orhan Pamuk

- First edition (Turkish)
- Author: Orhan Pamuk
- Original title: Benim Adım Kırmızı
- Translator: Erdağ M. Göknar
- Language: Turkish
- Genre: Historical novel
- Publisher: İletişim Yayınları (original Turkish); Faber & Faber (1st English ed.)
- Publication date: 1998
- Publication place: Turkey
- English publication date: 2001
- Media type: Print (hardback & paperback)
- Pages: 448 pp. (original Turkish) 417 pp (1st English ed.)
- ISBN: 975-470-711-1 (original Turkish); ISBN 0-571-20047-8 (1st English ed.)
- OCLC: 223008806
- LC Class: PL248.P34 B46 1998

My Name Is Red (Turkish: Benim Adım Kırmızı) is a 1998 Turkish novel by writer Orhan Pamuk translated into English by Erdağ Göknar in 2001. The novel, concerning miniaturists in the Ottoman Empire of 1591, established Pamuk's international reputation and contributed to his reception of the Nobel Prize in Literature in 2006.

The book has been translated into more than 60 languages since publication. The French translation won the French Prix du Meilleur Livre Étranger and the Italian version the Premio Grinzane Cavour in 2002. The English translation, My Name Is Red, won the International Dublin Literary Award in 2003.

In recognition of its status in Pamuk's oeuvre, the novel was re-published in Erdağ Göknar's translation as part of the Everyman's Library Contemporary Classics series in 2010. BBC Radio 4 broadcast an adaptation of the novel in 2008.

== Outline ==
Several of the major characters in the novel belong to the same workshop of miniaturists in the Ottoman Empire during the reign of Murad III. The first chapter of the novel ("I am a corpse") is narrated by one of the workshop's illuminators (Elegant Effendi) who has just been murdered. In the chapters narrated by his murderer, the reader learns that this illuminator was concerned about the increasingly Western attitude towards painting in a project commissioned by the Sultan.

Subsequent chapters are narrated by different characters — including four living members of the Sultan's workshop, a man named Black who has just returned to his uncle's home in Istanbul after 12 years of travel and who is the first living character to narrate the novel, by several drawings (the archetype of a horse, a dog, a counterfeit gold coin, Satan, and two dervishes); and one chapter, which gives the novel its name, is narrated by the color red. In all, there are 21 different narrators.

Enishte Effendi, the maternal uncle of the main character (Black), is reading the Book of the Soul by Ibn Qayyim al-Jawziyya, a Sunni commentator on the Qur'an, and continuous references to it are made throughout the book. Al-Jawziyya argues, in the same fashion as Islamic doctrine, that the souls of the dead remain on earth and can hear the living.

For some of the miniaturists, in particular the head of the Sultan's workshop Master Osman, viewing miniatures or "perfected art" is less a way of seeing than a way of knowing the eternal. The many stories of master painters going blind at the end of their careers is thus presented less as an infirmity than as a consecration.

Like the drawings that narrate their stories, Shekure — Black's widowed cousin and romantic interest — is a narrator aware she is being read—"... just like those beautiful women with one eye on the life within the book and one eye on the life outside, I, too, long to speak with you who are observing me from who knows which distant time and place." The murderer, too, often reminds the reader he is self-conscious that what he says is being scrutinized for clues as to his identity.

== Characters ==
- Elegant Effendi, murdered miniaturist who speaks from the afterlife to the reader in the opening chapter.
- Kara (Black), miniaturist and binder. Recently returned from 12 years away in Persia. Nephew of Enishte ("Uncle").
- Enishte Effendi, maternal uncle of Black, who is in charge of the creation of a secret book for the Sultan in the style of the Venetian painters.
- Shekure, Enishte's beautiful daughter with whom Black is in love; Shekure (related to English 'sugar' refers to Shirin, meaning 'sweet', also the name of Pamuk's mother).
- Shevket, Shekure's older son (also the name of Orhan Pamuk's older brother).
- Orhan, Shekure's younger son (also Pamuk's first name).
- Hasan, the younger brother of Shekure's husband.
- Hayriye, slave girl in Enishte's household, Enishte's concubine.
- Master Osman, head of the Sultan's workshop of miniaturists. This character is based on Nakkaş Osman.
- Butterfly, one of three miniaturists suspected for the murders.
- Stork, one of three suspect miniaturists.
- Olive, one of three suspect miniaturists. This character is based on Veli Can
- Esther, a Jewish peddler, a matchmaker, carries lovers' letters.
- Nusret Hoja, a Conservative Muslim leader who may be based on an historical figure. Opposes coffee and coffeehouses, bawdy stories, and figurative paintings.

== Books within the book ==
A number of books illustrated by famous miniaturists are referenced by the characters in My Name is Red: Several of the specific manuscripts described (most prominently the Shahnama of Shah Tahmasp, more commonly known in the west as the Houghton shahnama) are real and survive in whole or part.

- Book of the Soul by Ibn Qayyim al-Jawziyya
- Surname-i Hümayun – Book of Imperial Festivities, by Nakkaş Osman (miniatures) and Seyyid Lokman Çelebi, in the story still under completion
- Shahnameh or the Book of Kings by the Persian poet Ferdowsi, is the national epic of the Persian-speaking world.
- Chronicle of Sultan Selim
- The Convergence of the Stars, ordered by Sam Mirza Safavi, son of Shah Ismail
- Hüsrev and Shirin by Nizami (English: Khosrow and Shireen), this love story forms the central idea behind the love story in My Name is Red
- Book of Equines by the Bukharan scholar Fadlan (a drawing of a horse is the key to finding the murderer in My Name is Red)
- The Illustration of Horses, three volumes on how to draw horses: The Depiction of Horses, The Flow of Horses, and The Love of Horses by Jemalettin of Kazvin
- The Blindman's Horses, a critique on the prior three volumes, by Kemalettin Riza of Herat
- History of Tall Hasan, Khan of the Whitesheep by Jemalettin
- Gulistan by Saadi
- Book of Victories with the funeral ceremonies of Sultan Süleyman the Magnificent
- Book of Skills

== Reception ==
A reviewer for Publishers Weekly admires the novel's "...jeweled prose and alluring digressions, nesting stories within stories" and concludes that Pamuk will gain many new readers with this "...accessible, charming and intellectually satisfying, narrative." A Kirkus Reviews critic describes the novel as "...a whimsical but provocative exploration of the nature of art in an Islamic society. . . . A rich feast of ideas, images, and lore." Jonathan Levi, writing in the L.A. Times Book Review, comments that "...it is Pamuk’s rendering of the intense life of artists negotiating the devilishly sharp edge of Islam 1,000 years after its birth that elevates My Name Is Red to the rank of modern classic." Levi also notes that the novel, although set four hundred years ago, reflects modern societal tensions. For this reason he calls it "...a novel of our time.’’

In The New York Times, Richard Eder describes Pamuk's intense interest in East-West interactions and explains some of the metaphysical ideas that permeate the novel. He also comments that the novel is not just about ideas: "Eastern or Western, good or bad, ideas precipitate once they sink to human level, unleashing passions and violence. ‘Red’ is chockfull of sublimity and sin." Eder also praises the characterization of Shekure, which he regards as the finest in the book. She is "...elusive, changeable, enigmatic and immensely beguiling." Eder concludes: "They (readers) will . . . be lofted by the paradoxical lightness and gaiety of the writing, by the wonderfully winding talk perpetually about to turn a corner, and by the stubborn humanity in the characters’ maneuvers to survive. It is a humanity whose lies and silences emerge as endearing and oddly bracing individual truths".

=== English translation ===
Erdağ Göknar's translation of My Name Is Red gained Pamuk international recognition and contributed to his selection as Nobel laureate; upon publication, Pamuk was described as a serious Nobel contender. The translation received praise from multiple reviewers including John Updike in The New Yorker: "Erdağ M. Göknar deserves praise for the cool, smooth English in which he has rendered Pamuk's finespun sentences, passionate art appreciations, sly pedantic debates, (and) eerie urban scenes." Multiple readers and critics consider My Name Is Red to be Pamuk's best work in English translation.

It won the International Dublin Literary Award in Dublin in 2003, where Göknar accepted the award on behalf of Pamuk. As is customary with this award, Göknar received a quarter share of the prize.

A recent study examined the faithfulness of the novel's translations using quantitative methods.

== Release details ==
- 1998, Turkey, Iletisim Yayincilik (ISBN 975-470-711-1), pub date ? 1998, hardback (first Turkish edition)
- 2001, UK, Faber & Faber (ISBN 978-0571200474), pub date 4 August 2001, paperback (first English edition)
- 2001, USA, Alfred A Knopf (ISBN 978-0375406959), pub date 28 August 2001, hardback
- 2002, UK, Faber & Faber (ISBN 978-0571212248), pub date 31 July 2002, paperback
- 2002, USA, Vintage Books (ISBN 978-0375706851), pub date ? September 2002, paperback (Translated by Erdag Goknar)
- 2008, UK, dramatised on BBC Radio 4 in 2 parts by Ayeesha Menon, directed by John Dryden, August 2008
- 2014, Pakistan, Jumhoori Publications (ISBN 978-9699739828), hardback, Translated into Urdu by Huma Anwar. received national literary recognition, including the UBL Literary Excellence Award (2015)
