= The Museum of Innocence =

2008 novel by Orhan Pamuk

- 2008 İletişim edition
- Author: Orhan Pamuk
- Original title: Masumiyet Müzesi
- Translator: Maureen Freely
- Language: Turkish
- Publisher: İletişim
- Publication date: 2008
- Publication place: Turkey
- English publication date: 2009
- Media type: Print (hardback & paperback)
- Pages: 592 pp. (original Turkish)
- ISBN: 978-975-05-0609-3 (original Turkish)
- OCLC: 276510603

The Museum of Innocence (Turkish: Masumiyet Müzesi) is a novel by the Turkish Nobel-laureate novelist Orhan Pamuk, published on August 29, 2008. The book, set in Istanbul between 1975 and 1984, is an account of the love story between a wealthy businessman, Kemal, and a poorer distant relative of his, Füsun. Pamuk said he used YouTube to research Turkish music and film while preparing the novel.

An excerpt, entitled "Distant Relations", appeared in The New Yorker on September 7, 2009. The English translation, by Pamuk's long-time collaborator Maureen Freely, was released on October 20, 2009 by Alfred A. Knopf.

== Plot ==
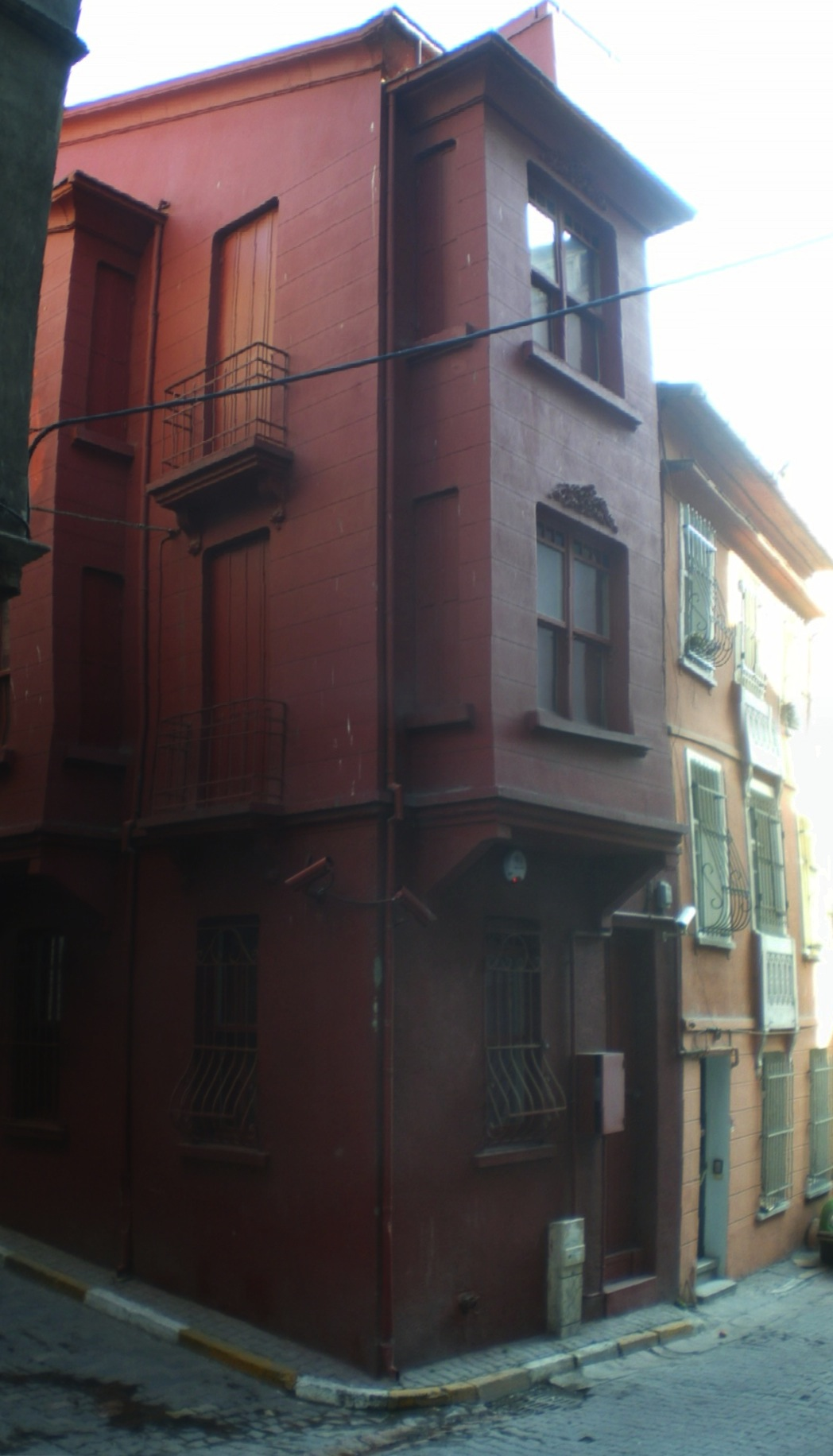
The building that houses the Museum of Innocence

Kemal has been engaged to a girl named Sibel for two months when he meets a girl at a shop, Füsun, while buying a handbag for his fiancée. What follows in the next month and a half is an intense physical and emotional relationship between them. Kemal's happiest moment comes while making love the day Füsun confesses her deep love for him.

Though it is clear that he has also fallen completely for Füsun, Kemal keeps denying this to himself, believing that his marriage with Sibel and secret relationship could continue forever. His reverie is broken when Füsun disappears just after attending his engagement. Now he has to come to terms with his deep attachment and love for Füsun. He goes through a very painful period for about a year, unable to meet Füsun and deriving consolation from objects and places related to his beloved and their lovemaking.

Kemal's engagement to Sibel breaks off and finally Füsun responds to his letter and agrees to meet him. Füsun is married, living with her husband and parents, and pretends to meet Kemal just as a distant relation, with undercurrents of anger. For the next eight years Kemal keeps visiting the family for supper and expressing his love for Füsun in various ways, while finding consolation in various objects related to her that he carries away from the house.

Finally after her father’s death, circumstances lead Füsun to divorce her husband. Füsun and Kemal are to be married after a trip around Europe together, but fate has something else in store and they become separated forever after a night of intense love-making. Kemal regards each object related to Füsun and their love, collected over the years, as portraying some discrete moment of happiness and bliss in the passage of those nine years. He decides to convert Füsun’s house into a museum of innocence, including all these objects and also other memorabilia related to the period.

== Themes ==
=== Clash between East and West ===
Pamuk's work often deals with a clash of culture between East and West, which was cited as part of the reason for him being awarded the Nobel Prize in Literature. This novel continuously references the influence of the West (Europe and America) on Istanbul's culture, through both the idea of museums and the film industry, which becomes a large part of the novel.

=== Museums and collections ===
The book, along with its accompanying museum, continuously refers to museums and collections. The idea of hoarding and collecting as a shameful act that becomes public and appreciated in the form of a museum is addressed particularly in the last chapters.

=== Female identity and Turkish culture ===
One of the key themes throughout the novel is the role of women in Turkish culture. The novel describes the ostracism of women who have lost their virginity before marriage, despite the fact that many claim to have a "more western" attitude toward this in 1970s Istanbul. Pamuk describes this as the taboo of virginity that is part of an old system in Turkey.

In an interview Pamuk blended all of these themes as he commented on how the role of the museum is also one of ownership, as Kemal looks to own Füsun as a trinket in his own museum, rather than allow her autonomy in her own life.

Pamuk has established an actual "Museum of Innocence", based on the museum described in the book. It is housed in a building in the Çukurcuma neighbourhood of Beyoğlu, Istanbul, and displays a collection evocative of everyday life and culture of Istanbul during the period in which the novel is set. Originally, the museum was scheduled to be exhibited at Frankfurt’s Schirn Kunsthalle in October 2008, during the annual Frankfurt Book Fair, but the exhibition was cancelled. In 2010, Pamuk still hoped that the museum would be opened in 2011. After much delay, the museum was finally inaugurated in April 2012.

Although created later, the museum and the novel were conceived of in tandem, displaying the obsessive romance between two Istanbul families, as well as eternalizing a perspective on upper-class Istanbul in the 1970s. The project was supported by Istanbul 2010 – European Capital of Culture. According to the book, the museum allows free entry to those who bring a copy of the book. A ticket placed in the 83rd chapter of the book will be stamped upon entrance.

== Adaptations ==
Pamuk signed a contract for a screen adaptation in 2019, but declined to continue the partnership after creative differences. In 2021, the rights returned to Pamuk, and he signed a partnership with Ay Yapım to produce the show. Zeynep Günay Tan directed the series which was released in February 2026.

== Translations ==
- 2020, Pakistan, Jumhoori Publications (ISBN 9789696521297), hardback, Translated into Urdu by Huma Anwar.
