= Serdar Bulun =

Turkish gynecologist

- Born: Malatya, Turkey
- Scientific career
- Fields: Obstetrics and Gynecology; Reproductive endocrinology and infertility
- Institutions: Northwestern University; Prentice Women's Hospital; Northwestern Memorial Hospital
- Website: http://www.feinberg.northwestern.edu/sites/obgyn/research/labs/bulun/index.html

Serdar Bulun is a gynecologist, with a special interest in the common gynecologic diseases, endometriosis and uterine fibroids.

== Biography ==
Bulun was born in Malatya, Turkey in 1959 and moved to Istanbul to attend Robert College and thereafter Istanbul University School of Medicine (Çapa Tıp Fakültesi). He completed his residency in obstetrics and gynecology at the University at Buffalo in New York and pursued a sub-specialty fellowship in reproductive endocrinology-infertility at the University of Texas Southwestern Medical Center at Dallas. Starting from 2003, he established a comprehensive women's health research program at Northwestern, and recruited and supported numerous faculty who focus on steroid hormone-related pathology of uterine, breast and ovarian disorders. Throughout his career, Dr. Bulun has been awarded over $70 million of research funding in endometriosis, uterine fibroids and breast cancer.

== Academic career ==
Bulun discovered the epigenetic basis of endometriosis leading to progesterone resistance in this disease, and introduced aromatase inhibitors as a novel class of drugs to treat it. His team isolated tumor stem cells from uterine fibroids and targeted these to treat this disease. His team discovered the first set of gain-of-function mutations affecting the aromatase gene leading to breast development and estrogen excess in prepubertal humans and contributed to the genetics and systems biology aspects of hormone-responsive disorders of the breast, including cancer.

Bulun is the editor-in-chief of Seminars in Reproductive Medicine. He has been elected to the National Academy of Medicine (formerly known as the Institute of Medicine), the Association of American Physicians and the American Society for Clinical Investigation. He served as the 2015 president for the Society for Reproductive Investigation. He has received the National Institutes of Health-MERIT award for his work in endometriosis and the American Society of Reproductive Medicine Distinguished Researcher Award.

== Honors ==
- National Academy of Medicine (formerly Institute of Medicine, IOM, elected 2015)
- John J. Sciarra Professor of Obstetrics and Gynecology, Northwestern University (2012–present)
- Association of American Physicians (AAP, elected 2012)
- American Society for Reproductive Medicine (ASRM) Distinguished Researcher Award (2012)
- National Institutes of Health MERIT (R37) Award HD38691 (2010-2020)
- George H. Gardner Professor of Clinical Gynecology, Northwestern University (2006-2012)
- American Society for Clinical Investigation (ASCI, elected 2003)
