= Ramazan Özkepir =

Turkish judge (b. 1955)

Chief Judge of the Court of Cassation 19th Circuit
- In office December 22, 2014 – January 2, 2020

Member of the Presidential Council of Court of Cassation
- In office December 29, 2016 – April 29, 2018

Member of the Court of Cassation
- In office April 15, 2007 – January 2, 2020

Personal details
- Born: Ramazan Özkepir; January 2, 1955 (age 71) Aksaray, Turkey
- Education: Istanbul University (B.L.)

Ramazan Özkepir (born January 2, 1955) is a Turkish jurist. He serves as chief judge of the Court of Cassation of Turkey Yargıtay 19th criminal circuit. He is a former member of the presidential council of the Court of Cassation.

== Early life ==
He was born in Aksaray, Turkey. He received a Bachelor of Laws degree in 1981 from Istanbul University. After he served as prosecutor and judge in several provinces, he was appointed to Yargıtay, Court of Cassation of Turkey as an investigating judge. He was elected as a member of the Court of Cassation on April 15, 2007. Özkepir was also member of Court of Jurisdictional Disputes from 2007 to 2011 and member of the presidential council of the Court of Cassation from 2016 to 2018.,

== Author ==
Özkepir is the author of numerous books and articles.

Here are some of his other works:

- Mala Karşı Suçlar
- Belgelerde Sahtecilik ve Bilişim Alanında Suçlar,
- Hırsızlık Suçları,
- Kasten Adam Öldürme Suçları,
- Ağır Ceza Davaları,
- Açıklamalı-İçtihatlı Ceza Muhakemeleri Usulü Kanunu,
- İçtihatlı Türk Ceza Kanunu,
- Belediye Mevzuatı,
- Yeni TCK-CMK-CGİK Ceza ve Yargılamada Temel Yasalar,
- Ceza Muhakemesi Kanunu Şerhi
- Özel Ceza Kanunları

== Sources ==
- Court of Cassation Bio
