= Günther Jacoby =

German theologian and philosopher

Jacoby as depicted in 1965, 4 years before his death

Friedrich Günther Jacoby (21 April 1881 – 4 January 1969) was a German theologian and philosopher.

== Life ==
Born in Königsberg, Jacoby studied Protestant theology there from 1900 to 1903. He acquired the licentiate degree with a text interpretation of the Biblical book of Jeremiah. After the state examination for the higher school service in religion, Hebrew and German, which he passed in 1904, he studied philosophy in East Prussia and Berlin while working as an assistant teacher and received his doctorate in 1906 under Friedrich Paulsen with the work Herders "Kalligone" und ihre Verhältnis zu Kants "Kritik der Urteilskraft". Two years as an exchange teacher in Paris and Glasgow followed and in 1908 a failed habilitation attempt in Münster. Finally Jacoby habilitated 1909 in Greifswald with his book Herders und Kants Ästhetik published two years before and based on his dissertation as well as the manuscript Die Philosophie Herders.

After completing his habilitation, Jacoby became a private lecturer in philosophy at Greifswald University. Jacoby's inaugural Greifswald lecture on pragmatism resulted in a correspondence with William James, which led to an invitation as a Research Fellow at Harvard University. In 1911 he presented the work Herder als Faust, in which he attempted to demonstrate by comparing texts that Johann Wolfgang von Goethe had Johann Gottfried Herder in mind as a model for his Faust drama. After a visiting professorship at the University of Illinois and extensive lecture tours in Asia and North Africa, Jacoby served for several months as a war volunteer officer on the Western Front before he was seriously wounded and, deemed as unfit for service, dismissed with the Iron Cross second class. In 1915 the Prussian Ministry of Culture recruited lecturers for the newly founded Istanbul University, and Jacoby taught there until November 1918, "using the amply granted leisure time for a never published opus on Herder and the New Foundation of German Philosophy in the Second Half of the 18th Century".

After his return, Jacoby joined the West Russian Volunteer Army but soon returned to Greifswald at the beginning of the summer semester 1919. In March 1920 he took part in the leadership of a volunteer company in the Kapp Putsch against the Weimar Republic. After the rapid failure of this uprising "Jacoby followed old sympathies only as a voter of the DNVP and dedicated himself to his life's work, the ontology of reality".

Jacoby's appointment was rejected by the Greifswald faculty because "Jacoby, who oscillates between philosophy and literary history and whom one had hardly seen because of his many trips abroad, was probably not a suitable candidate for such an increase in rank." A Jacoby-inspired establishment of a special professorship (Extraordinariat) for International Philosophy) in Kiel was rejected because of his lack of professional qualifications, and "the people of Greifswald, solely because of the 'predicament' of the homecomer from Constantinople, resisted the appointment as Extraordinarius".

Forced to retire in 1937 during the Third Reich because of his grandfather's ancestry, Jacoby was unable to resume teaching until 1945.

Part of Jacoby's estate is located in the University Library of Tübingen.

== Acknowledgement ==
Along with Nicolai Hartmann, Jacoby is considered the founder of "critical ontology", a form of critical realism directed against neo-Kantianism.

Jacoby stands out from a world view through his rejection of democracy ("the temporary stay in 'democratic states' has 'brought down' his already weak belief in popular rule even further"), and in 1921 he criticized in a brochure about "English and German mankind" with formulations like "paradise of the average humanity" an "English conformism" as "a Judaism disguised as Christian", to which he contrasted the freedom of German humanity".

Jacoby regards logic as a purely philosophical discipline which must be strictly distinguished from modern formal-mathematical logic (still called "logistics" by him), a position which he summarized in his monograph Die Ansprüche der Logistiker auf die Logik und ihre Geschichtsschreibung published in 1962 and which his pupil Bruno von Freytag-Löringhoff developed further in his succession.

Jacoby considers the task of logic to be to examine the concept of "logical" – in the sense of "consistent" – for its objective backgrounds independent of the closing subject. These backgrounds do not form the conclusion itself, which he regards as subjective and bound to a psychological subject; rather, everything logical is based on a "subject-free objective foundation," which is about "identities between facts". To the existence or non-existence of such identities everything logical refers, that is all "concepts, judgments, assumptions, deductive and inductive conclusions". In particular, for Jacoby species-generic relationships, i.e. relationships between more general facts, the genus, and more specific facts, the species, are determined by a certain type of identity and non-identity. Only this is relevant for logic.

Jacoby sees his understanding of logic and its field of objects, as well as his definition of identity, in stark contrast to modern formal logic, of which he also holds the opinion that it is connected to a certain epistemological position and is necessarily subject-bound.

For Jacoby, the judgments and conclusions are subject-bound, the concepts are subject-free objective, and since the object of logic must be the investigation of objective conditions, logic must begin at the level of concepts and not - as he sees it in modern formal logic - at the level of statements or conclusions. One consequence of this point of view is that the analysis of statements in the concept of subject and predicate (species and genus) and in the expression of their "identity", as it is carried out by traditional logic in the form of syllogistic, must be regarded as the only logically correct and that only syllogisms are valid conclusions.

The realization of modern logic that many intuitively valid arguments - for example, the argument "All horses are animals" often quoted in tradition, so all horse heads are animal heads - Jacoby agrees - after such an analysis cannot be proved to be valid; in order to nevertheless be able to uphold the validity of such arguments, he assumes that the respective argument must include additional premises which are merely not explicitly quoted, that the argument is thus incompletely formulated, as is an enthymeme.

Jacoby's conception of logic (he speaks of the "one logic") is strongly distinguished from modern logic, which works with formal and mathematical methods, as it exists for example in propositional calculus, predicate logic or modal logic. Jacoby regards this as mathematical disciplines, as individual sciences, which could not claim to have the knowledge of "true logic" and which are subordinate to philosophy.

That modern formal logic was nevertheless accorded such a high status by philosophy during Jacoby's lifetime, and that the recognition of his interpretation of traditional logic declined, he attributes in his work Die Ansprüche der Logistiker auf die Logik und ihre Geschichtschreibung (The claims of logisticians to logic and its historiography) to the fact that the representatives of modern logic are partly motivated by positivist philosophical hostility, partly for "confessional motives" but besides also out of "need for recognition", "immaturity" and "association consciousness" have built a global propaganda machine in order to jointly "as exponents of the ideology of an invisible international corporation" first "slander, then substance murder" commit the philosophical logic and finally take up its inheritance.

Jacoby died in Greifswald at the age of 87.

== Publications ==
- Glossen zu den neuesten kritischen Aufstellungen über die Composition des Buches Jeremja (Capp. 1–20), Königsberg 1902
- Der Pragmatismus. Neue Bahnen in der Wissenschaftslehre des Auslands. Eine Würdigung, Leipzig 1909
- Herders und Kants Ästhetik, Leipzig 1907
- Herder als Faust. Eine Untersuchung, Felix Meiner Leipzig 1911
- Englische und deutsche Mannesart, Moninger Greifswald 1921 (Deutsche Sammlung Band 1)
- Allgemeine Ontologie der Wirklichkeit, 2 volumes, Halle 1925 and 1955, new edition: Niemeyer Tübingen 1993, ISBN 3-484-70151-X (volume 1), ISBN 3-484-70152-8 (volume 2)
- Denkschrift über die gegenwärtige Universitätsphilosophie in der Deutschen Demokratischen Republik, 1955
- Die Ansprüche der Logistiker auf die Logik und ihre Geschichtsschreibung, Kohlhammer Stuttgart 1962
