= Istanbul University =

Public university in Istanbul, Turkey

- Turkish: İstanbul Üniversitesi
- Latin: Universitas Istanbulensis
- Former names: Sahn-ı Seman Medresesi (1453–1846); Dârülfünûn-ı Şâhâne (1846–1912); İstanbul Dârülfünûnu (1912–1933)
- Motto: Turkish: Tarihten Geleceğe Bilim Köprüsü
- Motto in English: Science Bridge from Past to the Future
- Type: Public research university
- Established: May 30, 1453; 573 years ago
- Founder: Mehmed II
- Affiliations: Coimbra Group; EUA; Bologna Process; Erasmus Programme; UNIMED; UNAI; AACSB
- Budget: $411 million (2025)
- Rector: Prof. Dr. Osman Bülent Zülfikar
- Academic staff: 4,339
- Administrative staff: 5,885
- Students: 58,809
- Undergraduates: 42,066
- Postgraduates: 16,268
- Location: Istanbul, Turkey; 41°00′46.93″N 28°57′49.95″E
- Campus: Urban
- University press: Istanbul University Press
Colors
- Website: www.istanbul.edu.tr

Istanbul University (Turkish: İstanbul Üniversitesi), also known as University of Istanbul, is a public research university located in Istanbul, Turkey. Founded by Mehmed II on May 30, 1453, a day after the Ottoman conquest of Constantinople, it was reformed as the first Ottoman higher education institution influenced by European approaches. The successor institution, which has been operating under its current name since 1933, is the first university in modern Turkey.

The university has 58,809 undergraduate, graduate, and doctoral students studying in 112 academic units, including faculties, institutes, colleges, and vocational schools at 9 campuses. The main campus is adjacent to Beyazıt Square in Fatih, the capital district of the province, on the European side of the city.

Istanbul University alumni include Nobel Prize in Chemistry winner Aziz Sancar and Nobel Prize in Literature winner Orhan Pamuk, as well as ex President of Turkey Abdullah Gül, six Prime Ministers of Turkey, including Suat Hayri Ürgüplü, Sadi Irmak, Nihat Erim, Refik Saydam, Naim Talu, and Yıldırım Akbulut. The alumni also include Grand Mufti for Bosnia and Herzegovina Mehmed Džemaludin Čaušević, the longest-serving President of Israel Yitzhak Ben-Zvi, as well as David Ben-Gurion and Moshe Sharett, who both served as Prime Ministers of Israel.

== History ==
The origins of Istanbul University date back to 1453, when it was founded by Ottoman Sultan Mehmed II as a school of philosophy, medicine, law, mathematics and letters. The University of Constantinople, established in 425 CE by the Eastern Roman emperor Theodosius II as the Pandidacterium, later became known as the Phanar Greek Orthodox College after the Fall of Constantinople in 1453. Immediately after the conquest of the city, Sultan Mehmet II assigned Molla Mehmet Zeyrek Efendi to convert the Pantokrator Monastery into a madrasah and appointed him as the first rector. Madrasah education continued to be given here until new educational buildings were built around the Fatih Mosque. Later, upon completion of the construction of the buildings, students and teachers moved to these new buildings. In the early stages, Istanbul University also functioned as a medrese, an Islamic theological school. Famous astronomer Ali Qushji took part in the establishment of higher education in the city and taught mathematics at the madrasah. This madrasa is regarded as the precursor to the Darülfünûn, a technical institute or university (lit. "House of Natural Sciences"), which evolved into Istanbul University in 1933. Education in various sciences and fields, including medicine, mathematics, astronomy, cartography, geography, history, philosophy, religion, literature, philology, and law, became available and, until the 19th century, played a key role in educating the ruling cadres of Ottoman society. However, when the medreses were no longer able to meet the needs of the time, a restructuring process began, leading to the establishment of Darülfünûn, (Note: Some pre-1930 Western sources refer to the Darülfünûn as the University of Constantinople, after the previous name of the entire city (not to be confused with the Byzantine era University of Constantinople, which was founded in 425 AD by the East Roman emperor Theodosius II as the Pandidacterium and was by some accounts the world's first university), or University of Stamboul or Université de Stamboul ("Stamboul" the name for the historic inner city).) the core of Istanbul University.

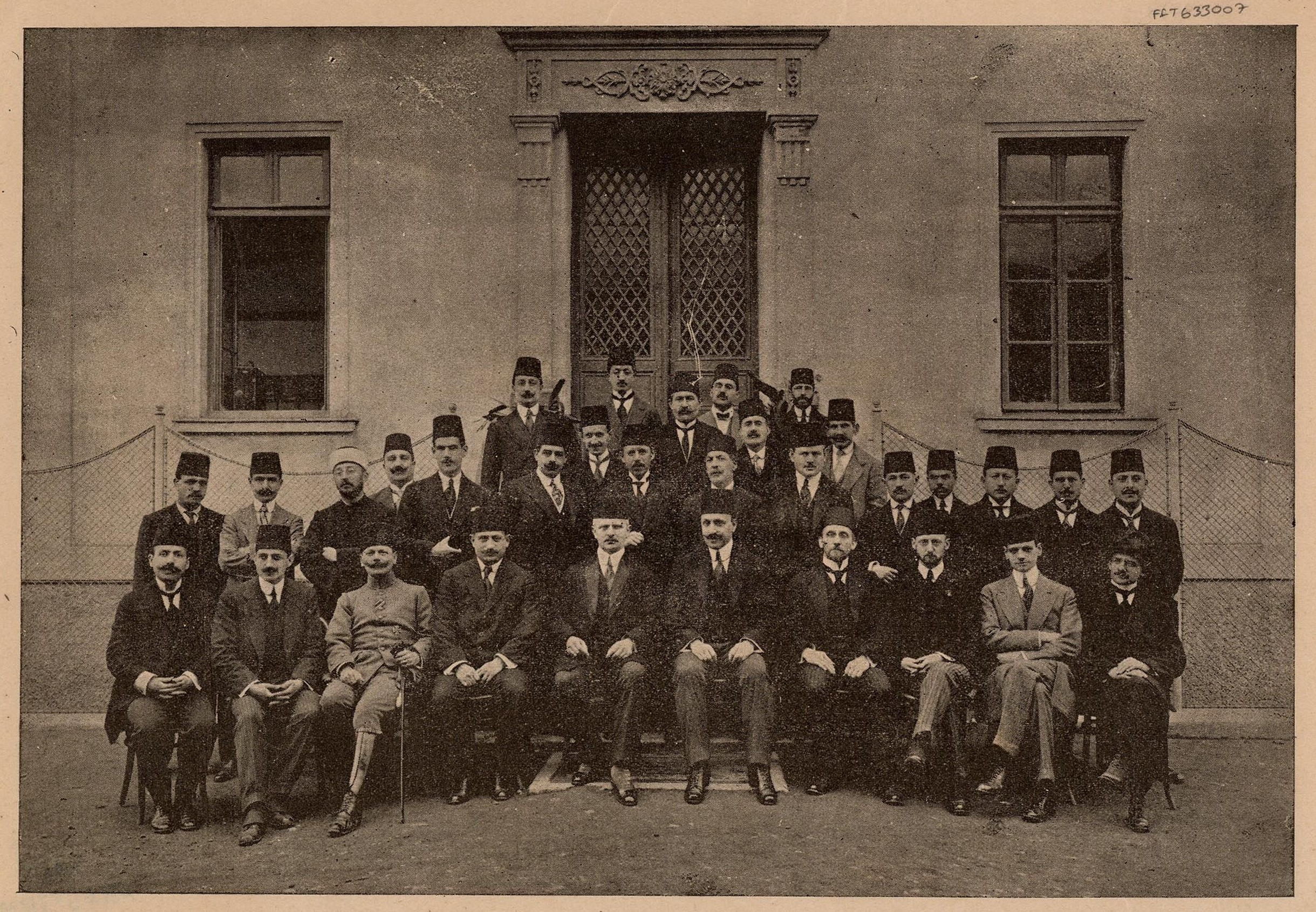
Faculty members of Istanbul University with Director Kemal Bey and the teaching staff, circa 1915.

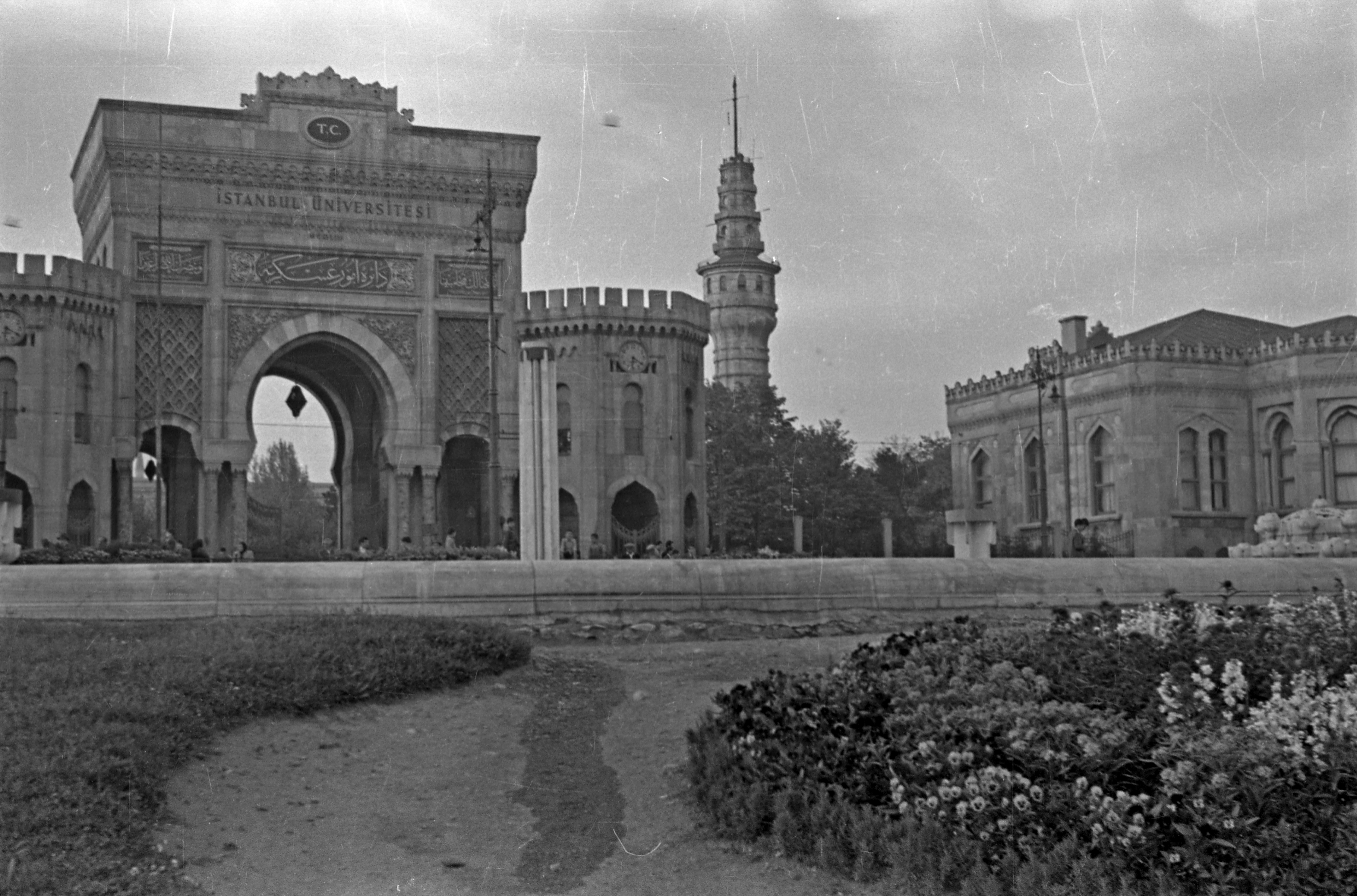
The main entrance to Istanbul University, 1950s.

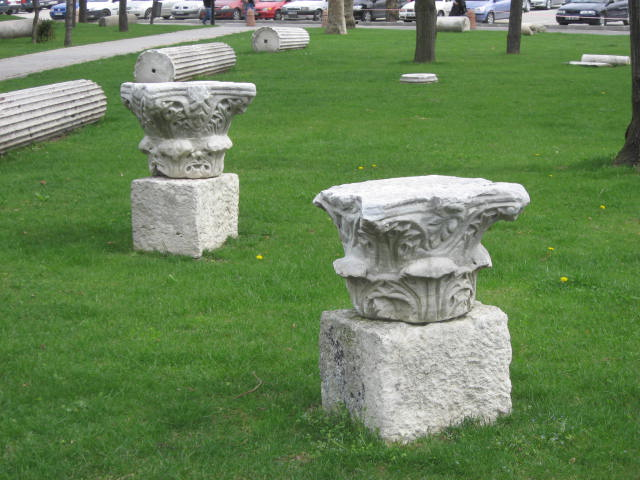
Late Roman and early Byzantine remains at the Istanbul University campus next to Beyazıt Tower.

An institution of higher education named the Darülfünûn-u Osmanî (lit. "the Ottoman Polytechnic Institute") was created in 1863, but suppressed in 1871. Its first rector was Hasan Tahsini, regarded as one of the most important Ottoman scholars of the 19th century. In 1874 the Darülfünûn-u Sultanî (lit. "the Royal College of Natural Sciences", French: Université Impériale Ottoman) began offering law classes in French, but was closed in 1881.

The Imperial College of Sciences, later known as Darülfünûn-u Şahâne, was reestablished in 1900 with departments in theology, arts, mathematics, science, and philology. In 1924, the faculties of law, medicine, arts and sciences were established in İstanbul Darülfünûnu, as the university was now called. Islamic theology was added in 1925, but in 1933 the university was reorganized without the latter.

The first modern applied physics courses were offered at the Darülfünûn on 31 December 1863, marking the beginning of a new era. On 20 February 1870, the school was renamed Darülfünûn-u Osmanî (lit. "the Ottoman House of Multiple Sciences") and reorganized to meet the needs of modern sciences and technologies. Starting in 1874, some classes in literature, law, and applied sciences were held at the Lycée de Galatasaray, continuing regularly until 1881. On 1 September 1900, the school was renamed and reorganized as Darülfünûn-u Şahâne (lit. "the Royal Polytechnic Institute"), offering courses in mathematics, literature, and theology. On 20 April 1912, the school was renamed İstanbul Darülfünûnu, with an expanded course offering and a modernized curriculum. The School of Medicine, Law, Applied Sciences, Literature, and Theology were established.

On 21 April 1924, the Republic of Turkey recognized İstanbul Darülfünûnu as a state institution. On 7 October 1925, its administrative autonomy was established, and the schools, which had been part of the old medrese system, became modern faculties. The Darülfünûn then consisted of five faculties: medicine, law, letters, theology, and science. The professors were granted academic freedom as outlined in Article 2 of Law 493. On 1 August 1933, İstanbul Darülfünûnu was reorganized as İstanbul Üniversitesi (lit. "Istanbul University") following the educational reforms of Mustafa Kemal Atatürk. Classes officially began on 1 November 1933.

Before World War II, many German scientists, particularly those from fields such as medicine, natural sciences, and humanities, were forced to flee Germany due to pressure on anti-Nazi scholars and artists, many of whom were Jewish. A significant number of these emigrants found refuge at Istanbul University, where they contributed to the growth of academic programs and research, enhancing the university's intellectual environment and fostering scientific efforts in Turkey.

== Campus ==
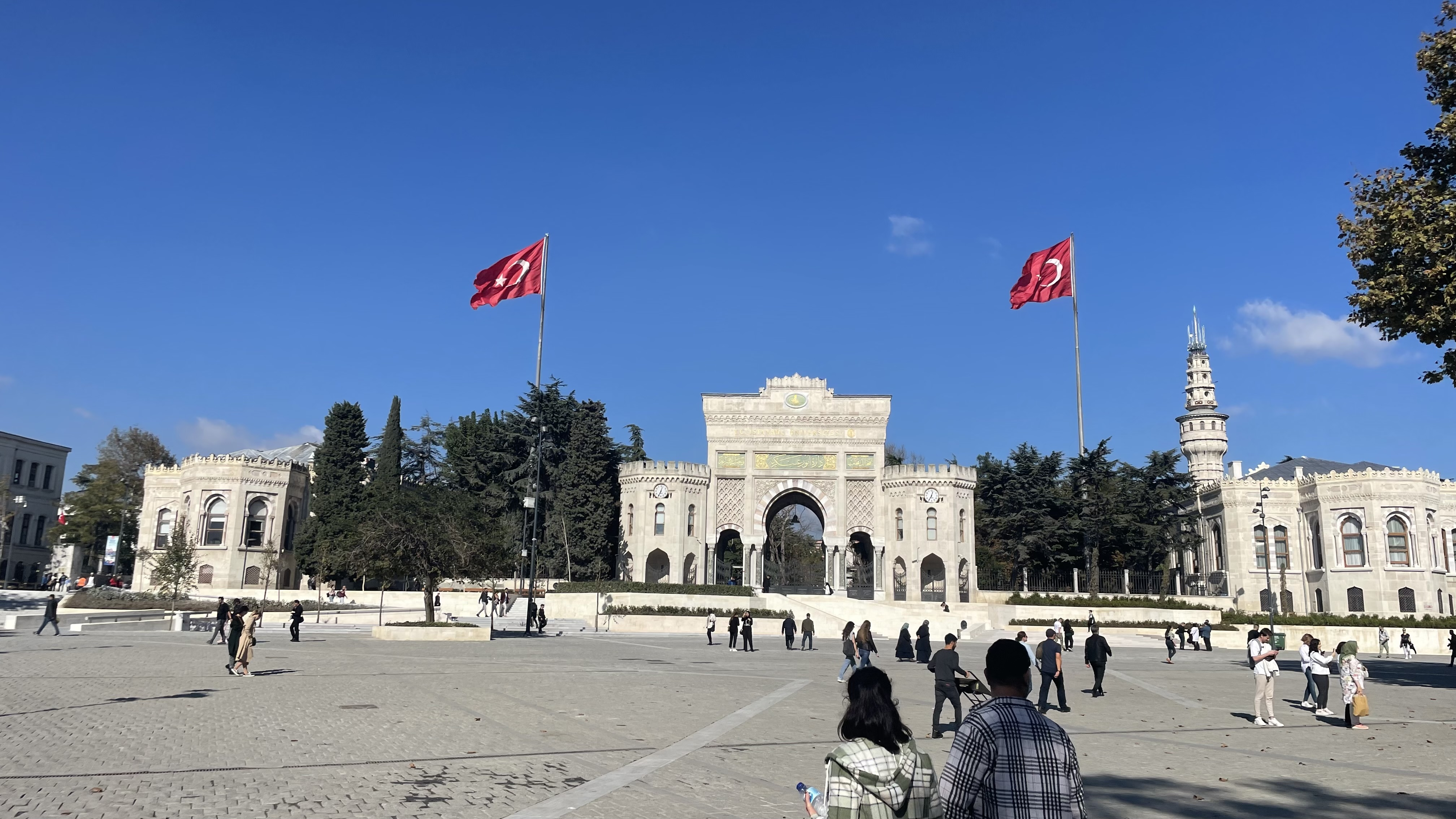
Main entrance gate of Istanbul University on Beyazıt Square, which was known as Forum Tauri (later Forum of Theodosius) in the late Roman period. Beyazıt Tower, located within the campus, is seen in the background, to the right of the flagpole.

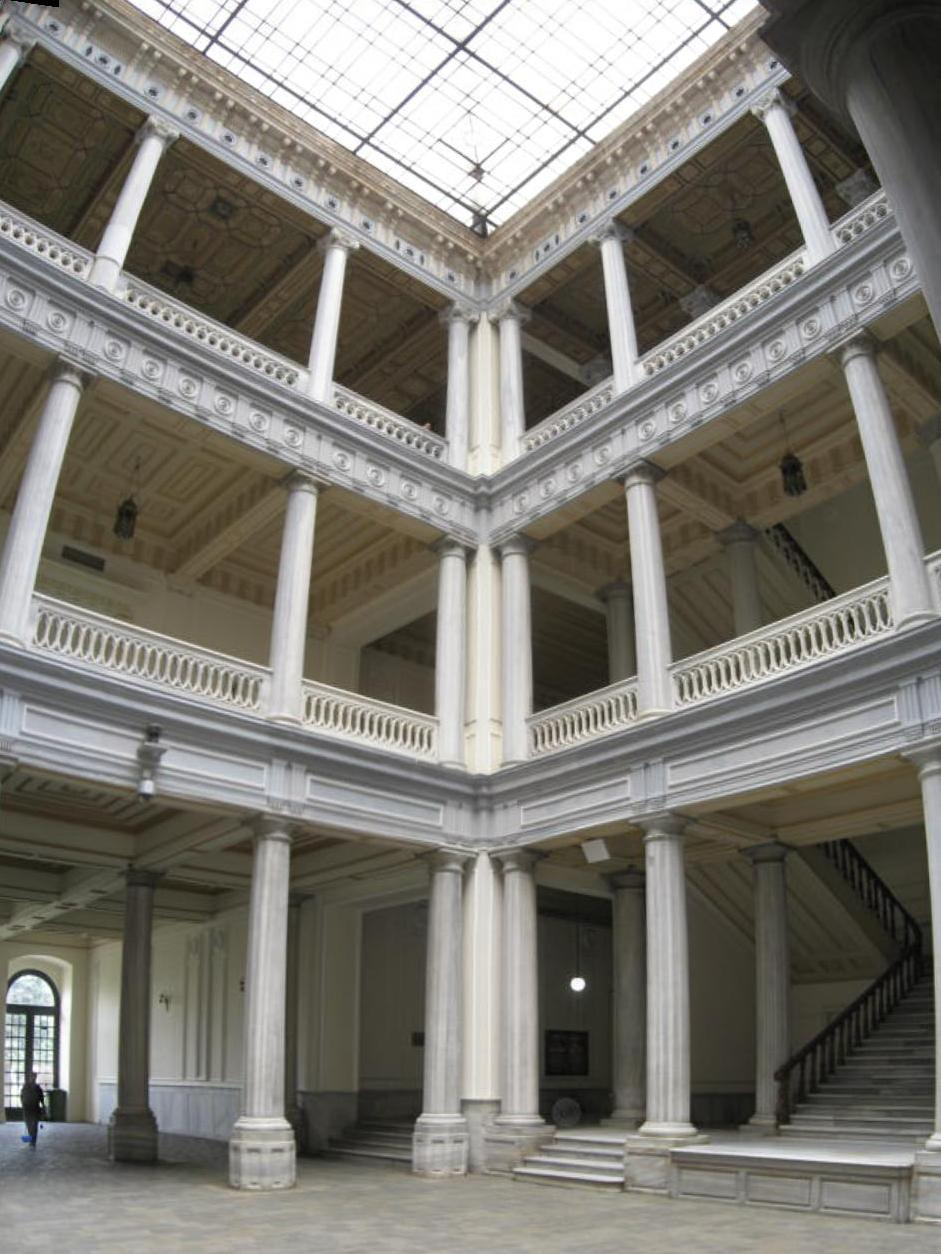
Interior view of the main building of Istanbul University.

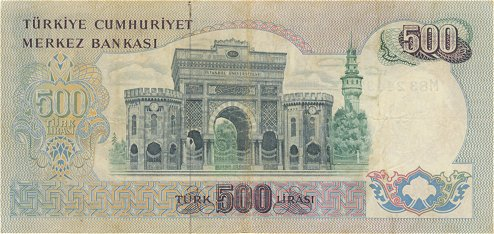
The arched monumental gate of Istanbul University on the reverse of the 500 lira banknote (1971–1984).

The university comprises seventeen faculties spread across five campuses. The main campus being on Beyazıt Square, which was originally built by Constantine the Great as the Forum Tauri and was later enlarged by Theodosius the Great as the Forum of Theodosius during the Roman period. Some Roman and Byzantine ruins are still visible on the grounds.

The building stands on the site of the Old Palace, the first palace built by the Ottoman Turks in Istanbul. Following the establishment of the Republic in 1923, the Ministry of War, like other ministries, relocated to Ankara, and the building was handed over to Darülfünun, the first and only university of the Ottoman Empire.

The current main building, designed by French architect Bourgerois, was completed in 1865-1866. In 1879, it began serving as the Ottoman Empire's Ministry of War. The Blue Hall and Pink Hall, located on the building's second floor, are adorned in an orientalist decorative style, featuring ceiling and wall ornamentations that reflect the overall aesthetic of the structure. The room currently used as the Rector's Office was originally the office of the Minister of War during the Ottoman Empire. The office also contains the desk of Enver Pasha, who served as the Minister of War from 1914 to 1918. The "Kılıçlık Hall," which is used for academic meetings today, was originally the venue for sword-donning ceremonies for officers within the Ministry of War during the Ottoman Empire. Before holding meetings in the Kılıçlık Hall, officers would use the area on the right side of the hall to place their swords, hang their coats, and perform ablutions.

The building, which was damaged in an earthquake in 1894, was restored by Italian architect Raimondo D'Aronco. In 1950, it was again restored by Ekrem Hakkı Ayverdi. The Rectorate Building has undergone several renovations over the years, with the most recent restoration, including façade and marble cleaning, taking place in 1998. The main gate was depicted on the reverse of the Turkish 500 lira banknotes of 1971–1984.

The building housing the Rare Books Library, designed by Kemaleddin Bey in 1913, is home to a collection of approximately 93,000 volumes, including printed and manuscript books, journals, newspapers, maps, plans, and notes in Turkish, Arabic, Persian, Greek and Latin. The collection also includes 911 albums known as the Abdülhamid II Collection, which contain 36,585 photographs. Additionally, the library holds the collections of prominent figures in Turkish politics and intellectual history, such as Zakirbaşı Hüseyin Halis Efendi, Hasan Rıza Pasha, Grand Vizier İbrahim Hakkı Pasha, Sheikh-ul-Islam Pirizade Mehmet Sahip Molla, and İbnülemin Mahmut Kemal İnal. In 1925, the collection of the Yıldız Palace Library was transferred to the Rare Books Library.

== International perspective and rankings ==
University rankings

Global – Overall
- ARWU World: 401–500 (2024)
- CWUR World: 693 (2024)
- CWTS World: 561 (2024)
- QS World: =628 (2026)
- RUR World: 244 (2024)
- THE World: 1001-1200 (2024)
- USNWR Global: 769 (2024)

Global – Business and economics
- QS Business: 401-450 (2024)

Global – Liberal arts
- QS Arts & Humanities: 294 (2024)
- QS Social Sciences and Management: 331 (2024)

Global – Life sciences and medicine
- QS Life Sciences & Medicine: 382 (2024)

Global – Science and engineering
- QS Engineering & Tech.: 451-500 (2024)

National – Overall
- ARWU National: 1 (2024)
- CWTS National: 7 (2024)
- CWUR National: 3 (2024)
- QS National: 7 (2024)
- THE National: 12 (2024)
- USNWR National: 11 (2024)

Istanbul University Graduate School of Business (Turkish: İstanbul Üniversitesi İşletme İktisadı Enstitüsü) was founded in 1954 with the collaboration of Harvard Business School and the Ford Foundation. Istanbul University Graduate School of Business also has a Beta Gamma Sigma honor society, which is the only honor business society in public universities in Turkey. Istanbul University School of Business is the only AACSB-accredited business school among the public universities in Turkey. Istanbul University Law School conducts a joint bachelor of laws (LL.B.) program in partnership with the University of Hamburg. This program enables students to study in both Turkey and Germany, covering multiple legal systems with coursework focused on both domestic and international law.

Istanbul University has established various collaboration and exchange agreements with universities around the world. These include partnerships with Yale University Wright Laboratory, Johns Hopkins University, and the University of Arizona in the United States; the University of Seoul, Dongguk University, and Hankuk University of Foreign Studies in South Korea; and Qatar University in Qatar. In Japan, the university has agreements with Ryukoku University, Tokyo University of Marine Sciences and Technology, Kindai University, and Tsurumi University. Istanbul University also collaborates with Tilburg University in the Netherlands, as well as Technische Universität Berlin, RWTH Aachen University, University of Cologne, Ruhr University Bochum, and LMU Munich in Germany. Additional partnerships include Essex University in the United Kingdom and the University of Western Ontario in Canada.

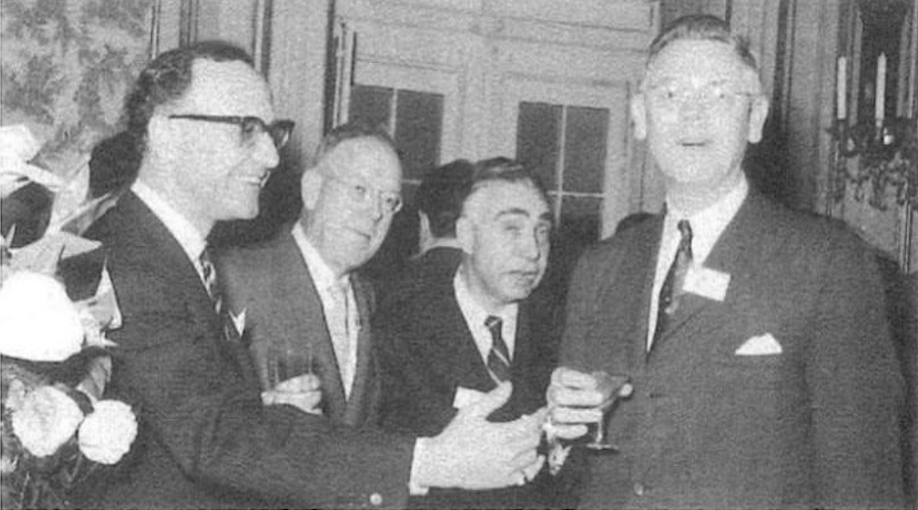
Prof. Robert Stone from Harvard Business School (Associate Director of the Istanbul University Graduate School of Business), Dr. Nejat Eczacıbaşı, Prof. Dr. Ömer Celal Sarç (Istanbul University), and Thomas Carrol from the Ford Foundation in Lisbon, April 1959.

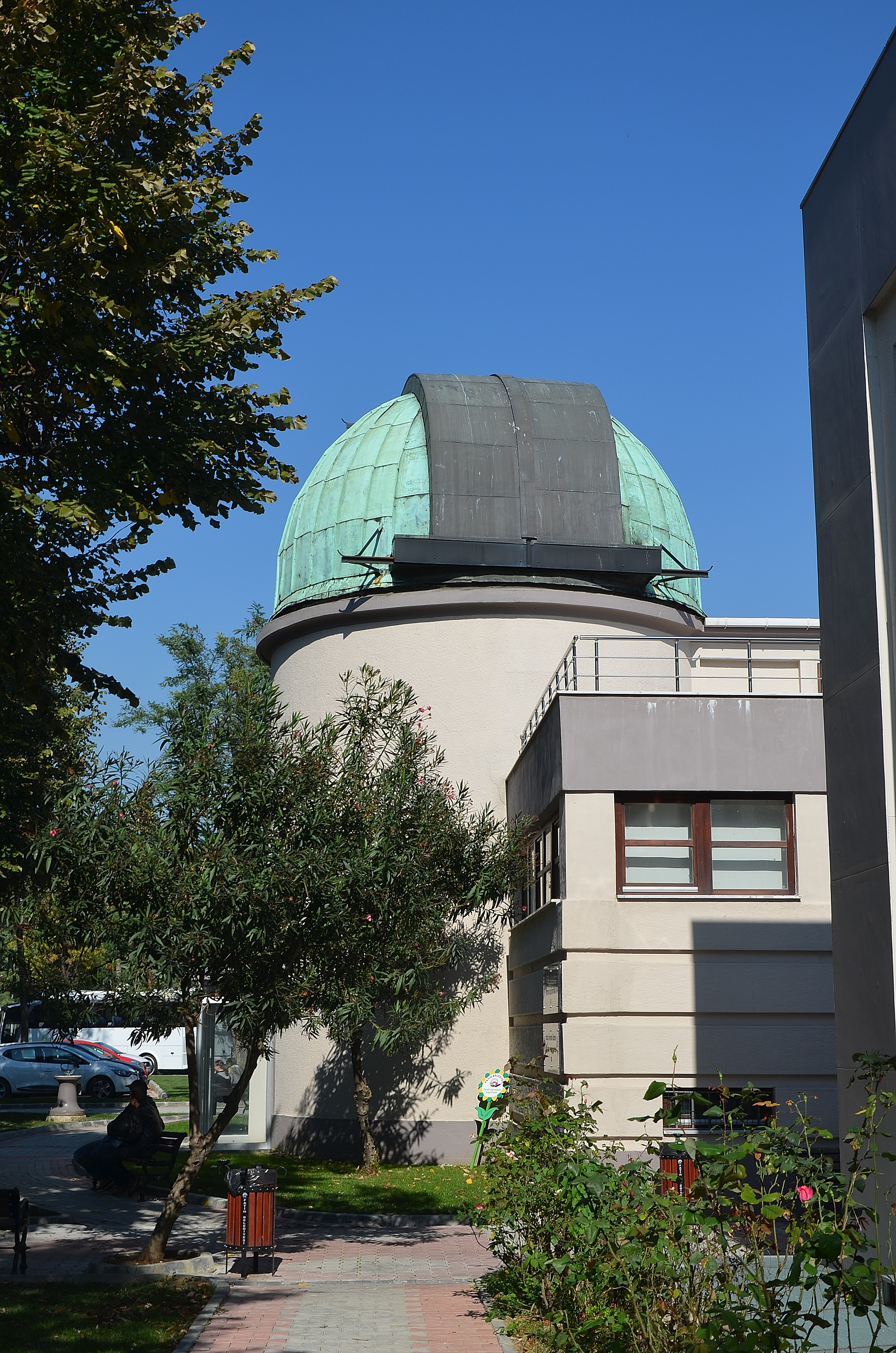
Istanbul University Observatory

Istanbul University maintains extensive Erasmus Programme student and faculty mobility agreements with numerous institutions across Europe, facilitating academic mobility and collaboration. In Germany, the university partners with Free University of Berlin, Humboldt University of Berlin, Goethe University Frankfurt, University of Freiburg, University of Hamburg, Heidelberg University, University of Mainz, University of Marburg, University of Mannheim, LMU Munich, and University of Tübingen. In Austria, partnerships include University of Graz, University of Innsbruck, and University of Vienna. The university also has agreements with several Belgian institutions, including University of Antwerpen, Gent University, KU Leuven, and University of Liège, as well as University of Copenhagen in Denmark. In France, Istanbul University collaborates with Bordeaux Montaigne University, University of Caen Normandy, Lumière University Lyon 2, Aix-Marseille University, University of Orléans, Paris Nanterre University, Institut National des Langues et Civilisations Orientales, and University of Strasbourg.

The Erasmus network extends to the Netherlands, with agreements with University of Amsterdam, University of Groningen, Leiden University, and Erasmus University Rotterdam, and to Ireland with the Royal College of Surgeons in Ireland. In Spain, the university partners with University of Barcelona, Pompeu Fabra University, University of Granada, University of Salamanca, and University of Zaragoza, while in Sweden, it collaborates with Lund University and Uppsala University. Additionally, Istanbul University maintains Erasmus agreements with several Italian universities, including University of Bologna, University of Florence, University of Milano-Bicocca, University of Naples Federico II, University of Padua, and Sapienza University of Rome, as well as University of Luxembourg in Luxembourg, Eötvös Loránd University, Debrecen University, University of Pécs, and Szeged University in Hungary, University of Oslo in Norway, and University of Coimbra in Portugal.

The university actively participates in research and innovation programs supported by the European Commission and Horizon Europe, which provide funding for cutting-edge research across various fields. These partnerships enable Istanbul University to contribute to and benefit from large-scale research projects that foster scientific progress and innovation. Additionally, the university collaborates with NATO in research initiatives related to security, technology, and scientific advancement, benefiting from access to valuable resources and expertise in areas of mutual interest. Istanbul University is also an official member of the CMS Experiment at CERN, a collaboration that focuses on high-energy physics research and the study of fundamental particles.

== Notable faculty ==
See also Academic staff of Istanbul University for a detailed list.

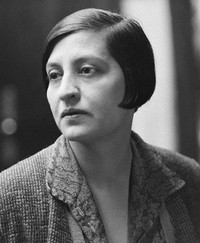
Halide Edib Adıvar, Turkish novelist and intellectual

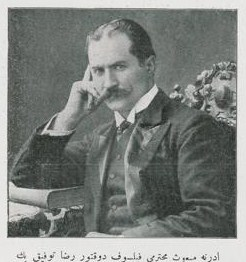
Rıza Tevfik Bölükbaşı, Turkish philosopher and politician

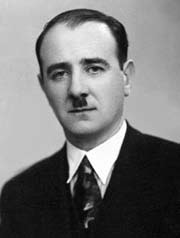
Mehmet Fuat Köprülü, Turkish historian and former Minister of Foreign Affairs

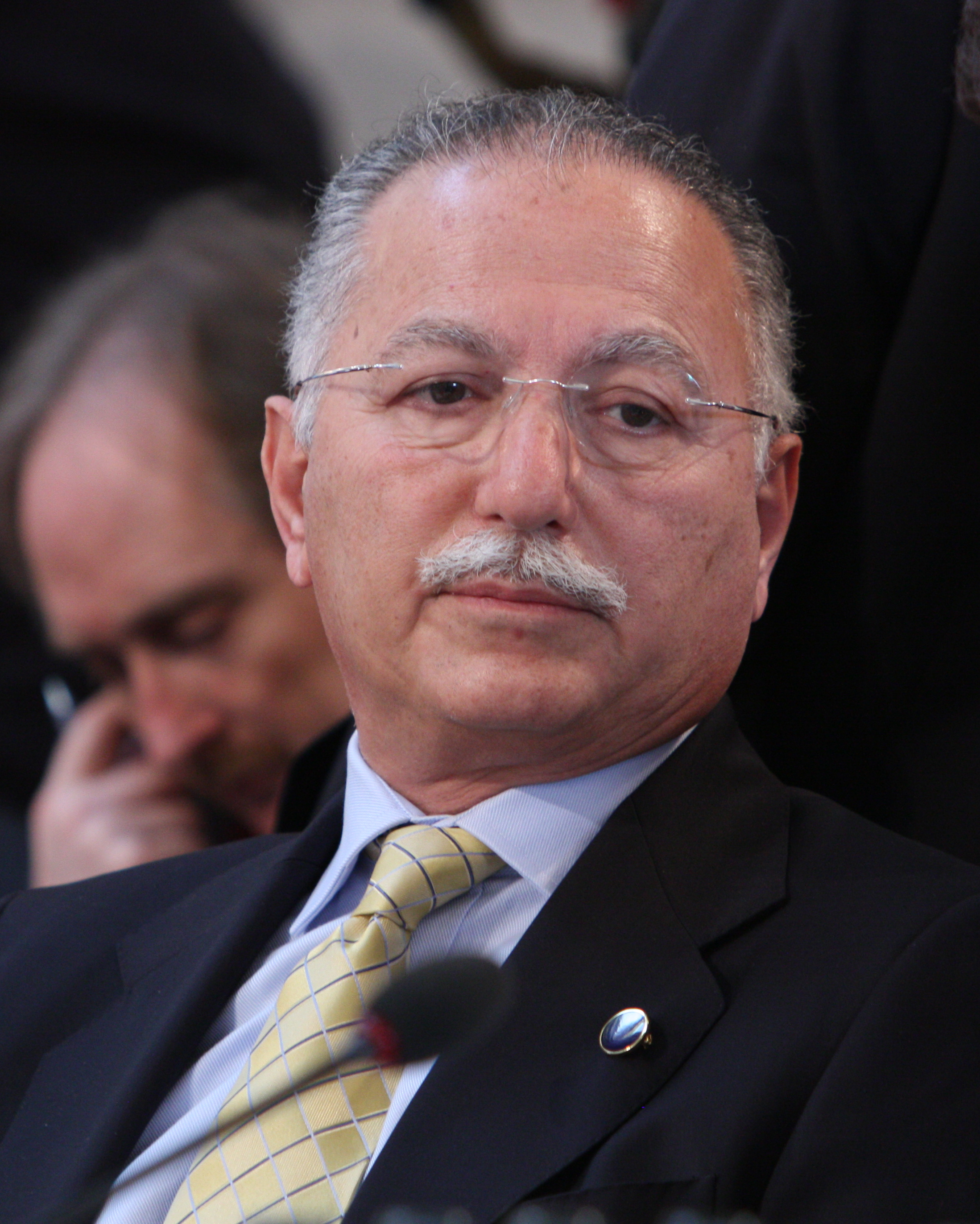
Ekmeleddin İhsanoğlu, Science history professor and diplomat

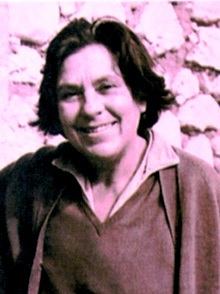
Halet Çambel, Turkish archaeologist and Olympic fencer

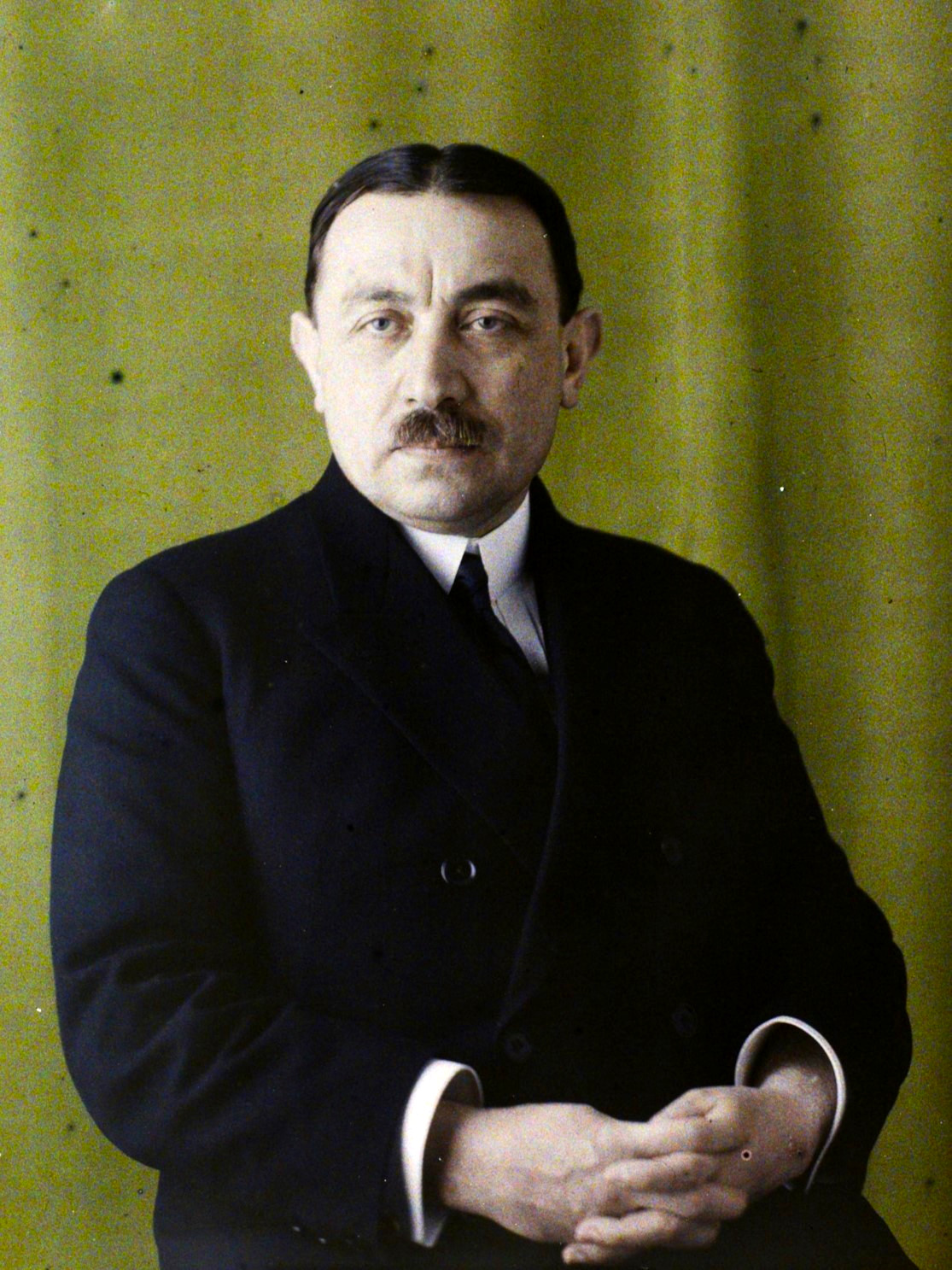
Ahmet Ferit Tek, Turkish military officer and historian

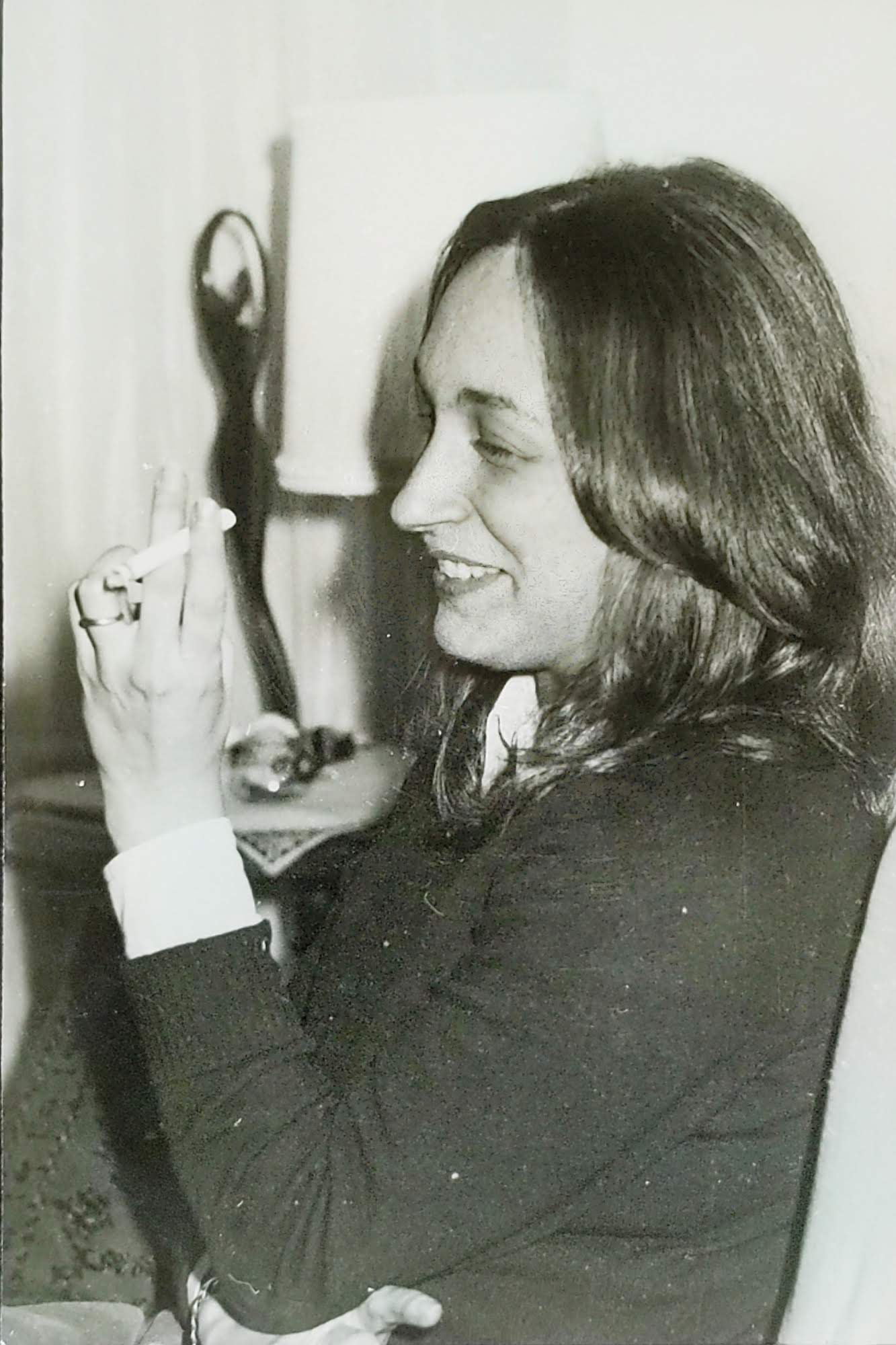
Zeynep Ergun, Turkish English literature scholar
- Halide Edib Adıvar – Turkish novelist, English literature scholar and political activist
- Asaf Savaş Akat – Turkish economist
- Cahit Arf – Turkish mathematician
- Süleyman Ateş – Turkish theologian, philosopher, and writer
- Halet Çambel – Turkish archaeologist and fencer
- Süheyl Batum – Turkish constitutional law scholar
- Cemil Bilsel – Turkish lawyer and politician
- Rıza Tevfik Bölükbaşı – Turkish poet and philosopher
- Zeynep Ergun – English literature scholar
- Semavi Eyice – Turkish art historian and archaeologist
- Sabahattin Eyüboğlu – Turkish writer, essayist, translator and film producer
- Ekmeleddin İhsanoğlu – Turkish diplomat and former Secretary-General of the Organization of Islamic Cooperation.
- Mehmet Fuat Köprülü – Turkish politician and historian
- Şebnem Korur Fincancı – Turkish medic and president of the Turkish Medical Association
- Zeyyat Hatiboğlu – Turkish economist
- Ayşe Işıl Karakaş – Former judge at the European Court of Human Rights
- Şevket Aziz Kansu – Turkish medical doctor and anthropology scholar
- Numan Kurtulmuş – Turkish politician and academic who is currently the speaker of the Grand National Assembly
- Burhan Kuzu – Turkish constitutional law scholar and politician
- İbrahim Kafesoğlu – Turkish historian
- Enver Ziya Karal – Turkish historian and former president of the Turkish Historical Society
- Ayhan Ulubelen – Turkish analytical chemist
- Bilge Umar – Turkish writer and jurist
- Süleyman Yalçın – Turkish medical doctor and academic
- Hasan Âli Yücel – Turkish education reformer and former Minister of National Education
- Levon Zekiyan – Armenologist, philosopher, Professor of Armenian Language and Literature at Ca' Foscari University of Venice
- Muammer Aksoy – Turkish lawyer and politician
- Ahmet Ferit Tek – Turkish military officer and historian

== Notable expatriate faculty ==
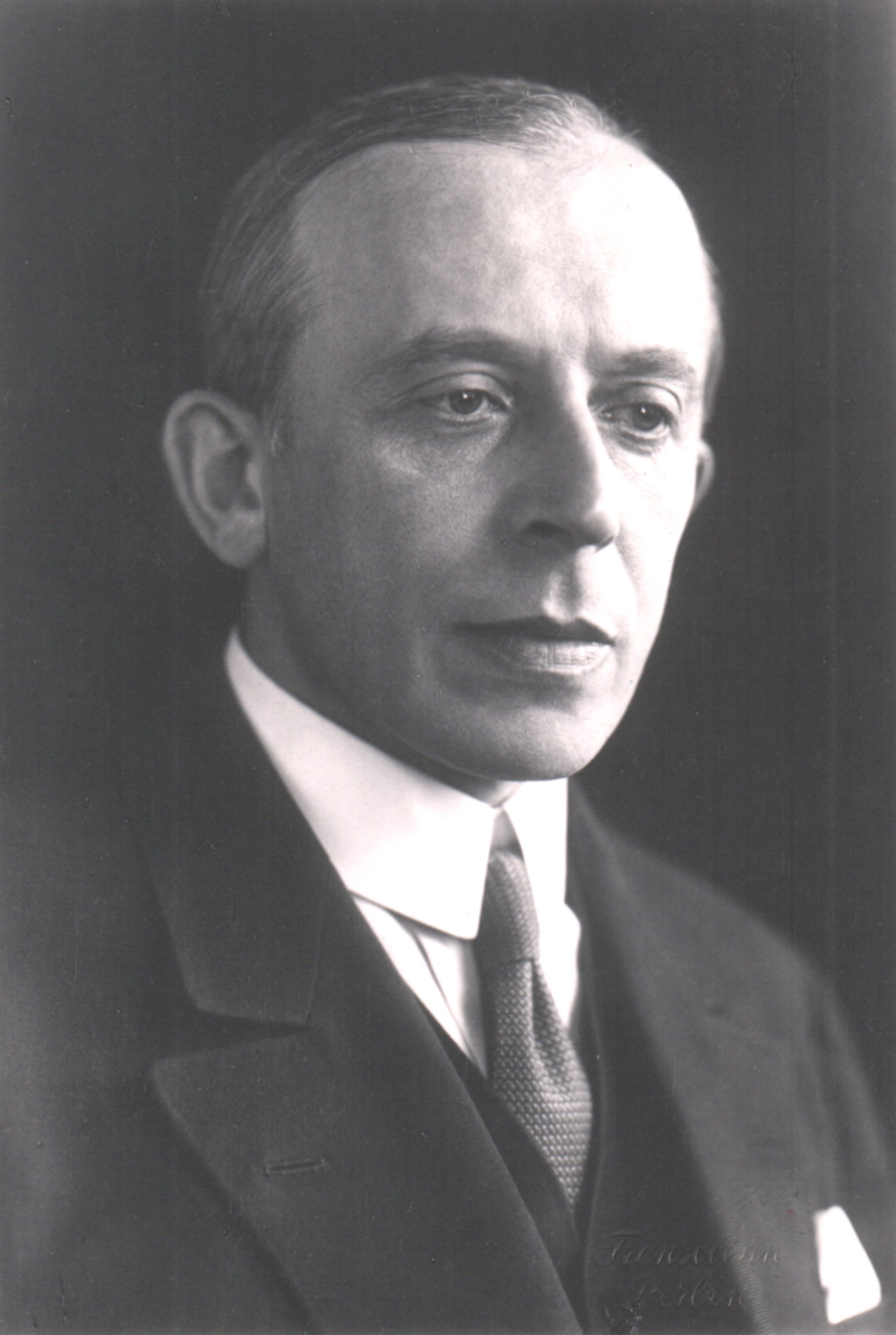
Richard von Mises, Austrian scientist and mathematician

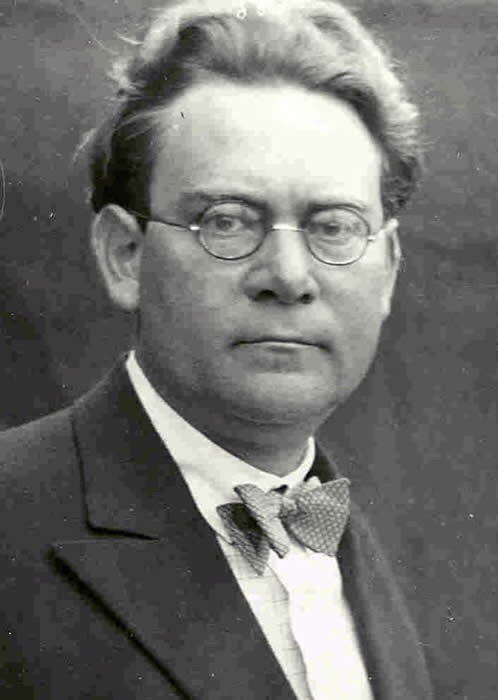
Hans Reichenbach, German philosopher

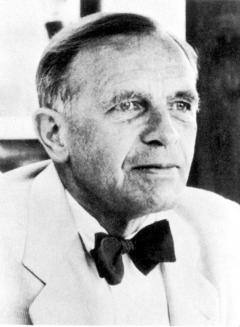
Wilhelm Röpke, German economist and social critic

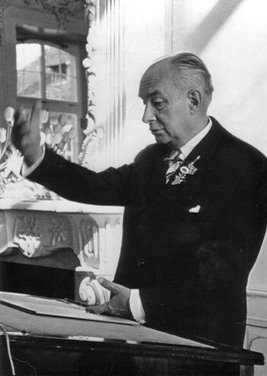
Alexander Rüstow, German sociologist and economist

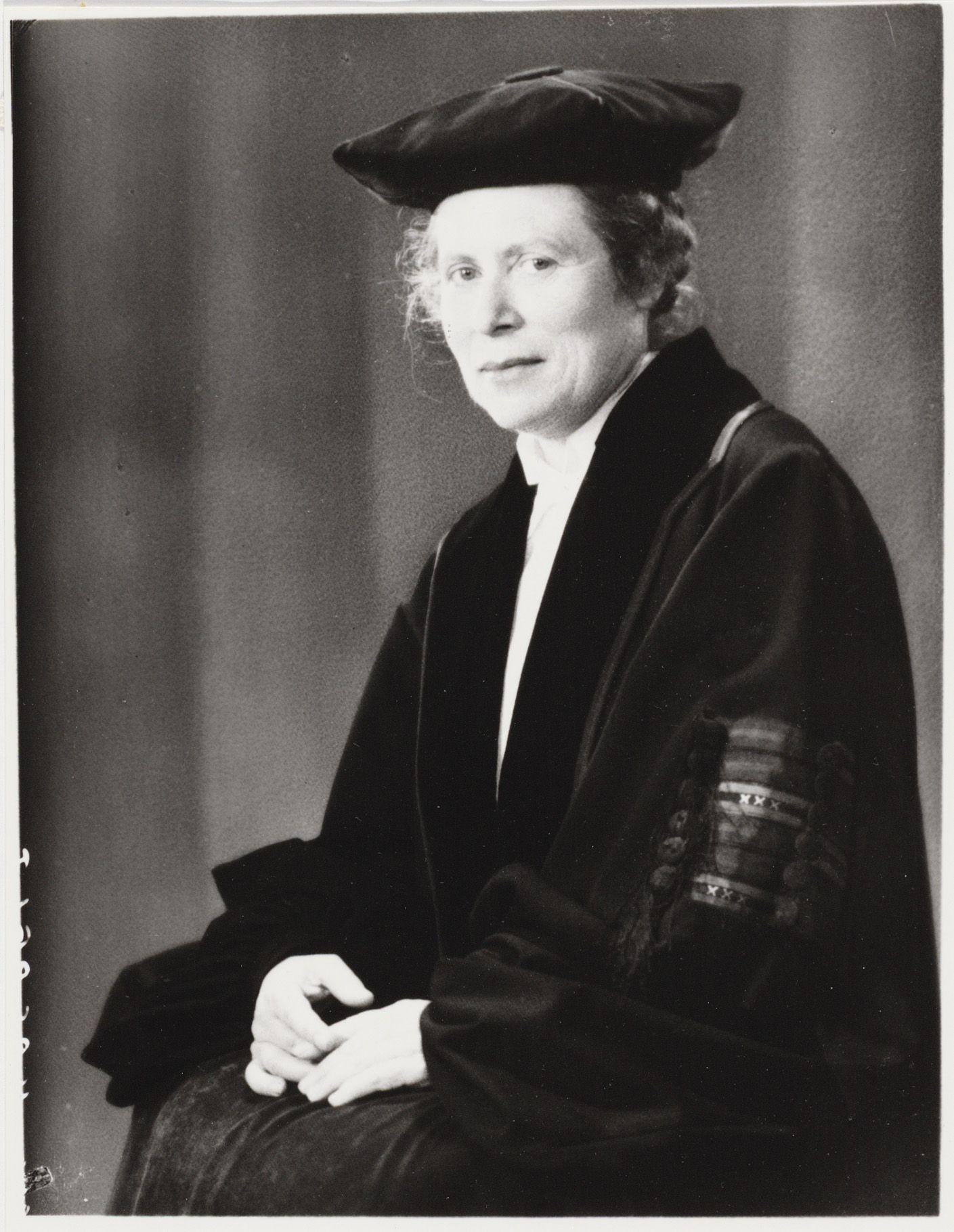
C. H. E. Haspels, Dutch classical archaeologist

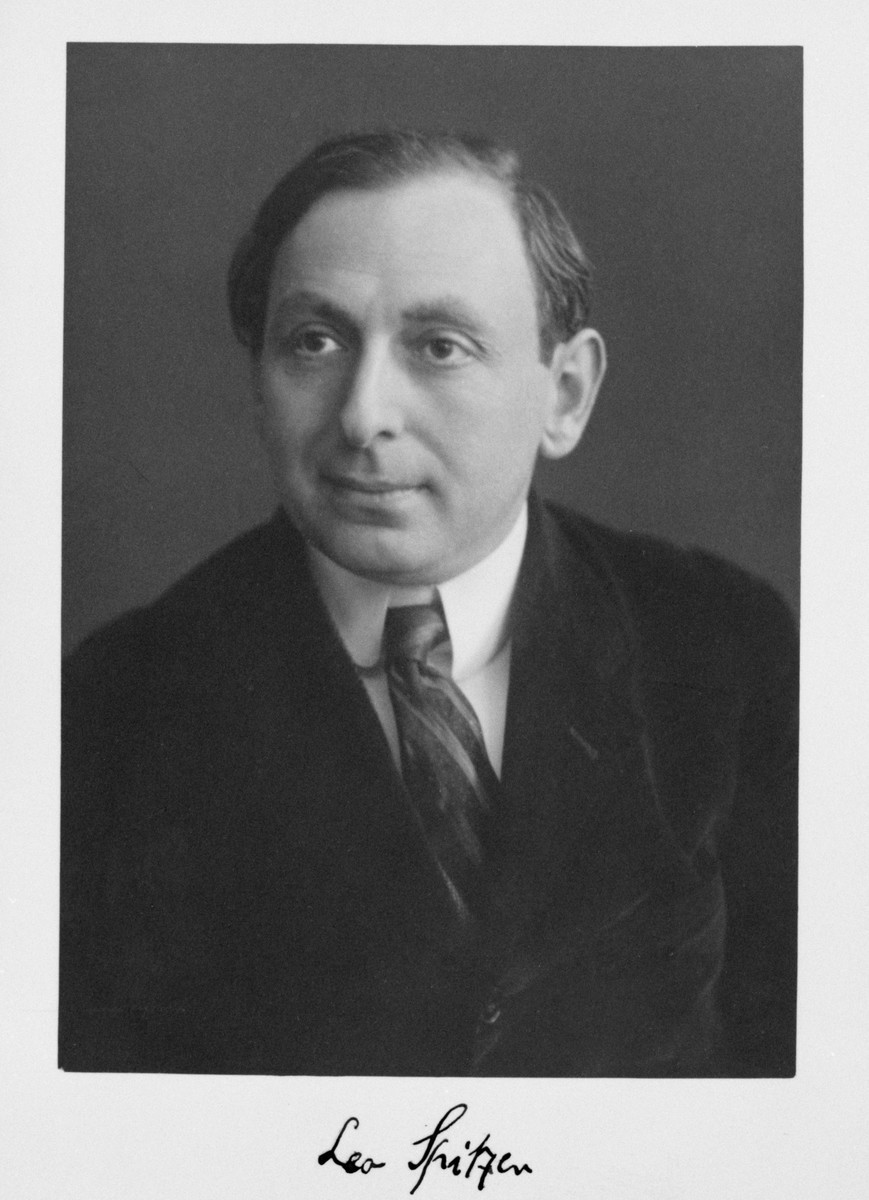
Leo Spitzer, Austrian Romanist and Hispanist
- Fritz Arndt (1885–1969) – German chemist (1915–1918)
- Erich Auerbach (1892–1957) – German philologist (1936–1947)
- Alexander Rüstow (1885–1963) – German sociologist and economist (1933–1949)
- Helmuth Theodor Bossert (1889–1961) – German philologist and art historian and archaeologist (1934–1959)
- Max Clara (1899–1966) – German anatomist
- Georges Dumézil (1898–1986) – French philologist, religion historian (1923–1931)
- Erwin Finlay-Freundlich (1885–1964) – German astronomer (1933–1937)
- Albert Gabriel (1883–1972) – French art historian (1926–1930)
- Hilda Geiringer (1893–1973) – Austrian mathematician (1934–1938)
- C. W. M. Hart (1905–1976) – Australian anthropologist (1959–1969)
- C. H. E. Haspels (1894–1980) – Dutch archaeologist
- Felix Haurowitz (1896–1987) – Czech medical doctor and biochemist (1939–1948)
- Baymirza Hayit (1917–2006) – Uzbek historian and orientalist
- Richard Honig 1890–1981) – German penologist (1934–1939)
- Alfred Isaac (1888–1956) – German economist (1937–1950)
- Günther Jacoby (1881–1969) – German theologian and philosopher (1915–1918)
- Curt Kosswig (1903–1982) – German zoologist and geneticist (1937–1955)
- Lotte Loewe (1900–Unknown) – German organic chemist (1934–1955)
- Hans Marchand (1907–1978) – German linguist
- Gerhard Kessler (1883–1963) – German social policy scholar
- Richard von Mises (1883–1953) – Austrian mathematician
- Fritz Neumark (1900–1991) – German economist (1934–1954)
- Rudolph Nissen (1896–1981) – German surgeon (1933–1949)
- William Prager (1904–1980) – German mathematician
- Hans Reichenbach (1891–1953) – German philosopher (1938–1945)
- Oskar Rescher (1884–1972) – German scholar in Arabic, Persian, and Turkish literature
- Umberto Ricci (1879–1946) – Italian economist (1942–1945)
- Hellmut Ritter (1892–1971) – German orientalist (1926–1949, 1956–1969)
- Wilhelm Röpke (1899–1966) – German economist
- Hans Oswald Rosenberg (1879–1940) – German astronomer (1938–1940)
- Leo Spitzer (1887–1960) – Austrian Romanist and Hispanist, philologist (1925–1930)
- Andreas Tietze (1914–2003) – Austrian scholar of Turkish lexicography and language (1938–1957)

== Notable alumni ==
See also Istanbul University alumni and Darülfünun alumni for a detailed list.

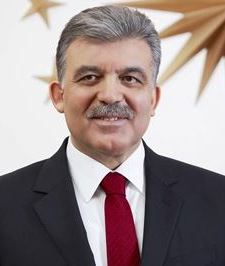
Abdullah Gül, 11th President of Turkey

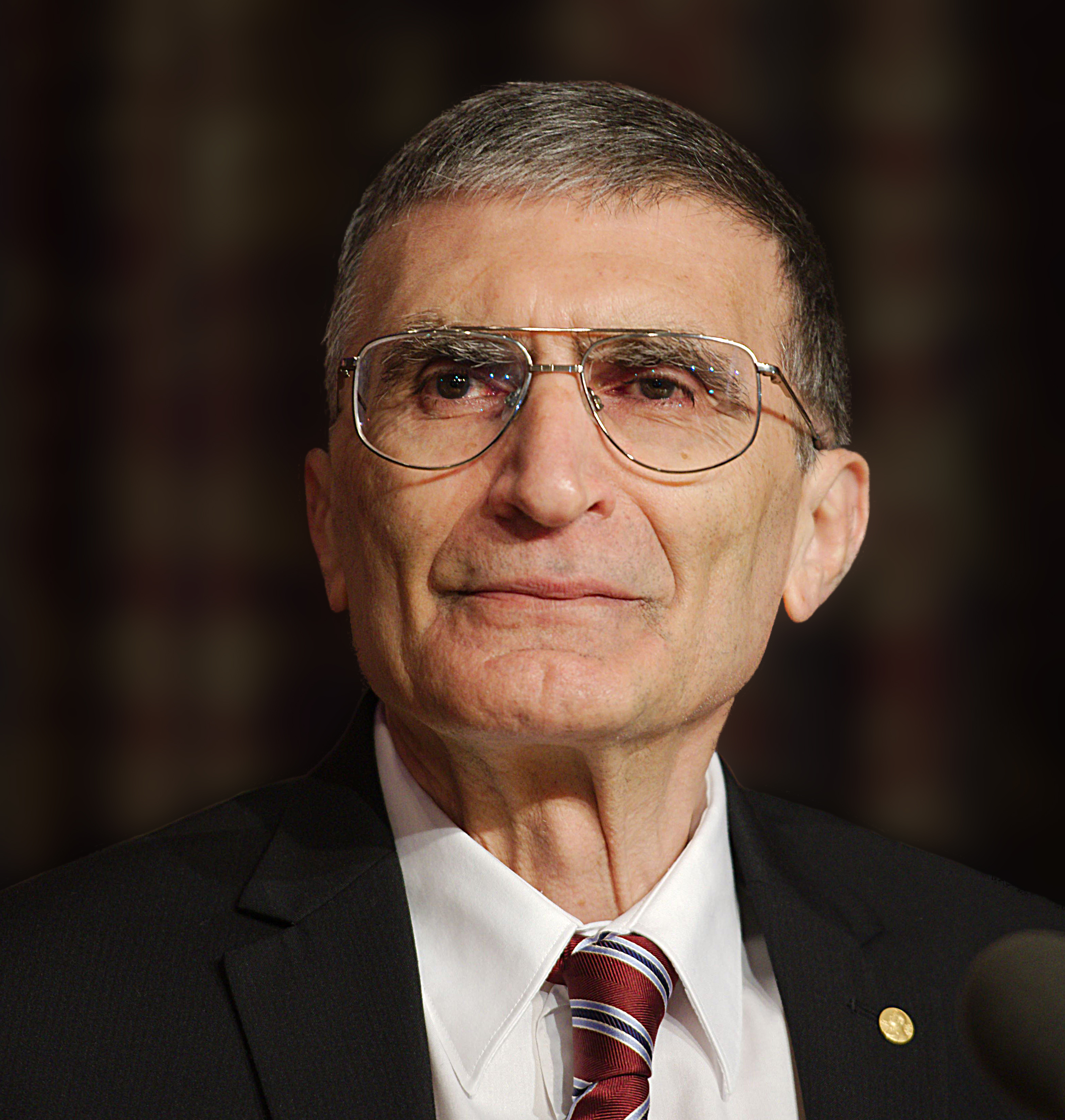
Aziz Sancar, Nobel Prize in Chemistry winner molecular biologist

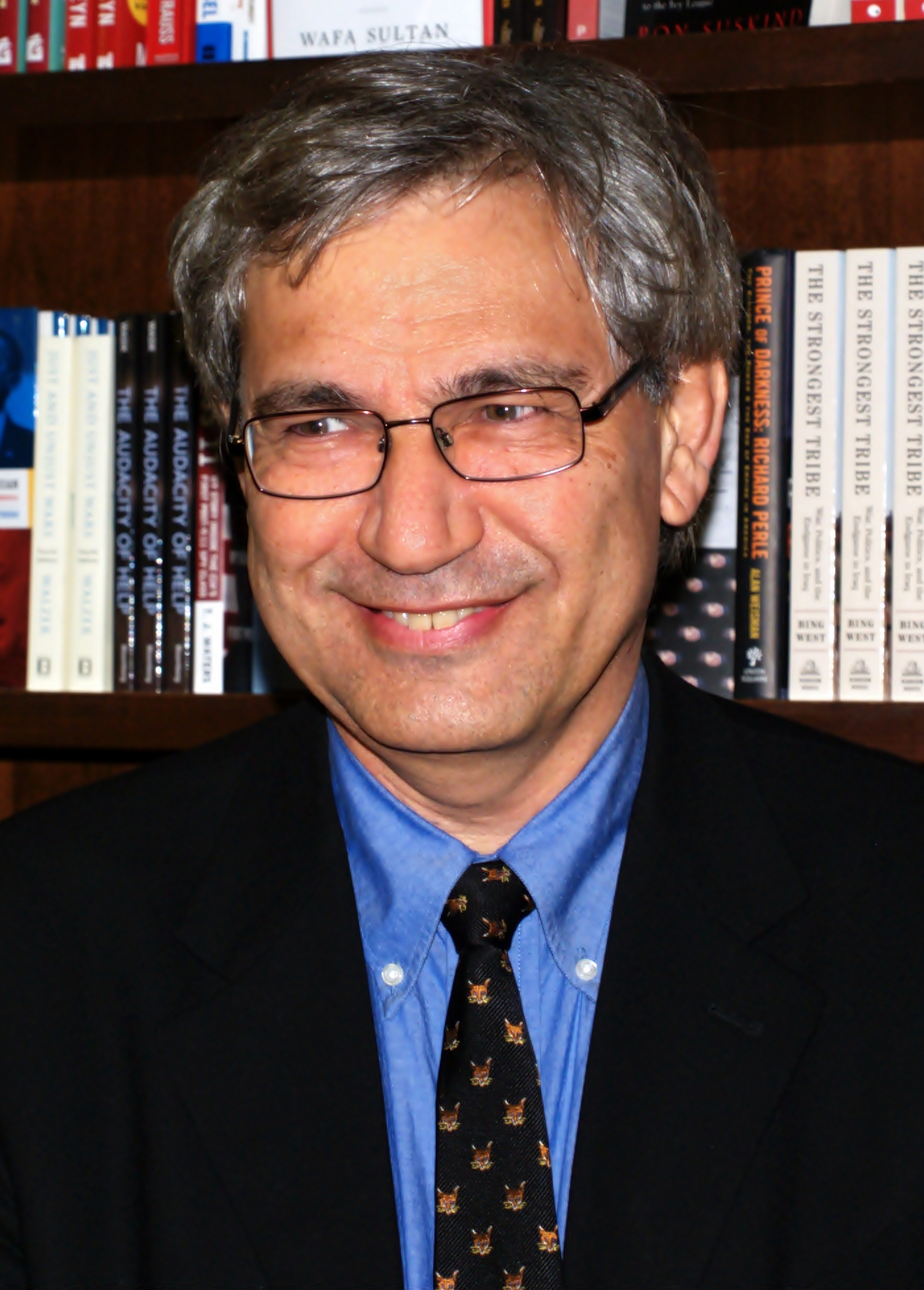
Orhan Pamuk, Nobel Prize in Literature winner novelist

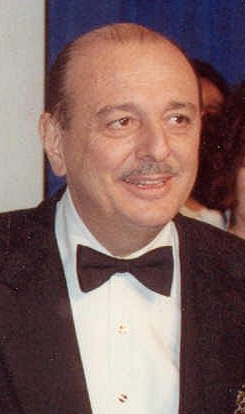
Arif Mardin, 11-times Grammy winner Turkish-American music producer

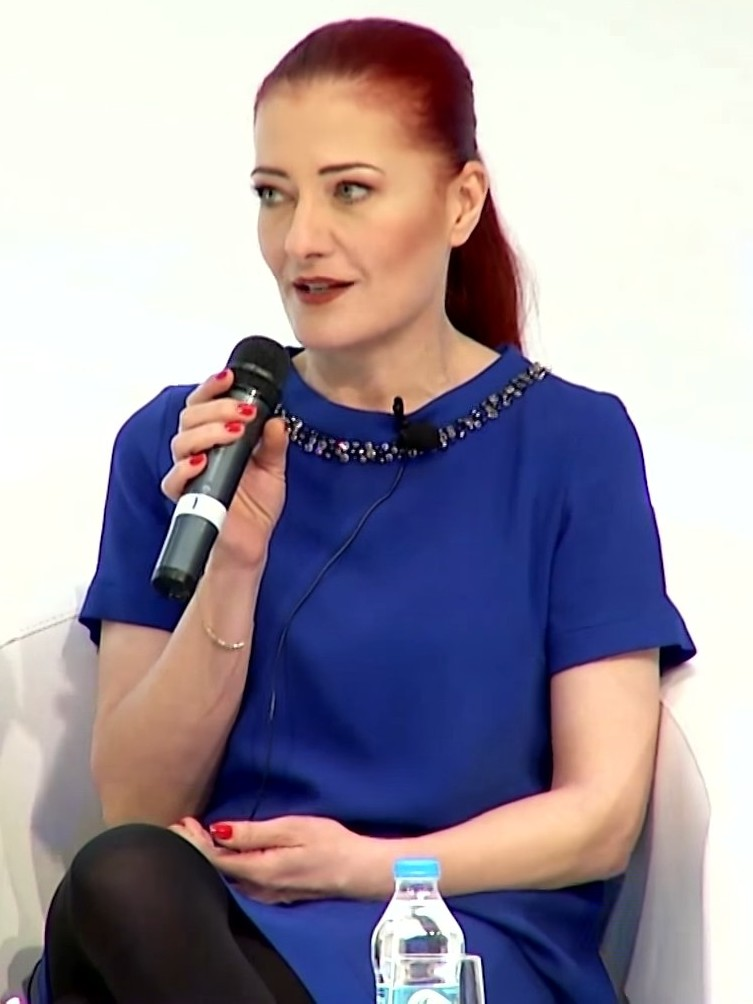
Candan Erçetin, Turkish singer-songwriter

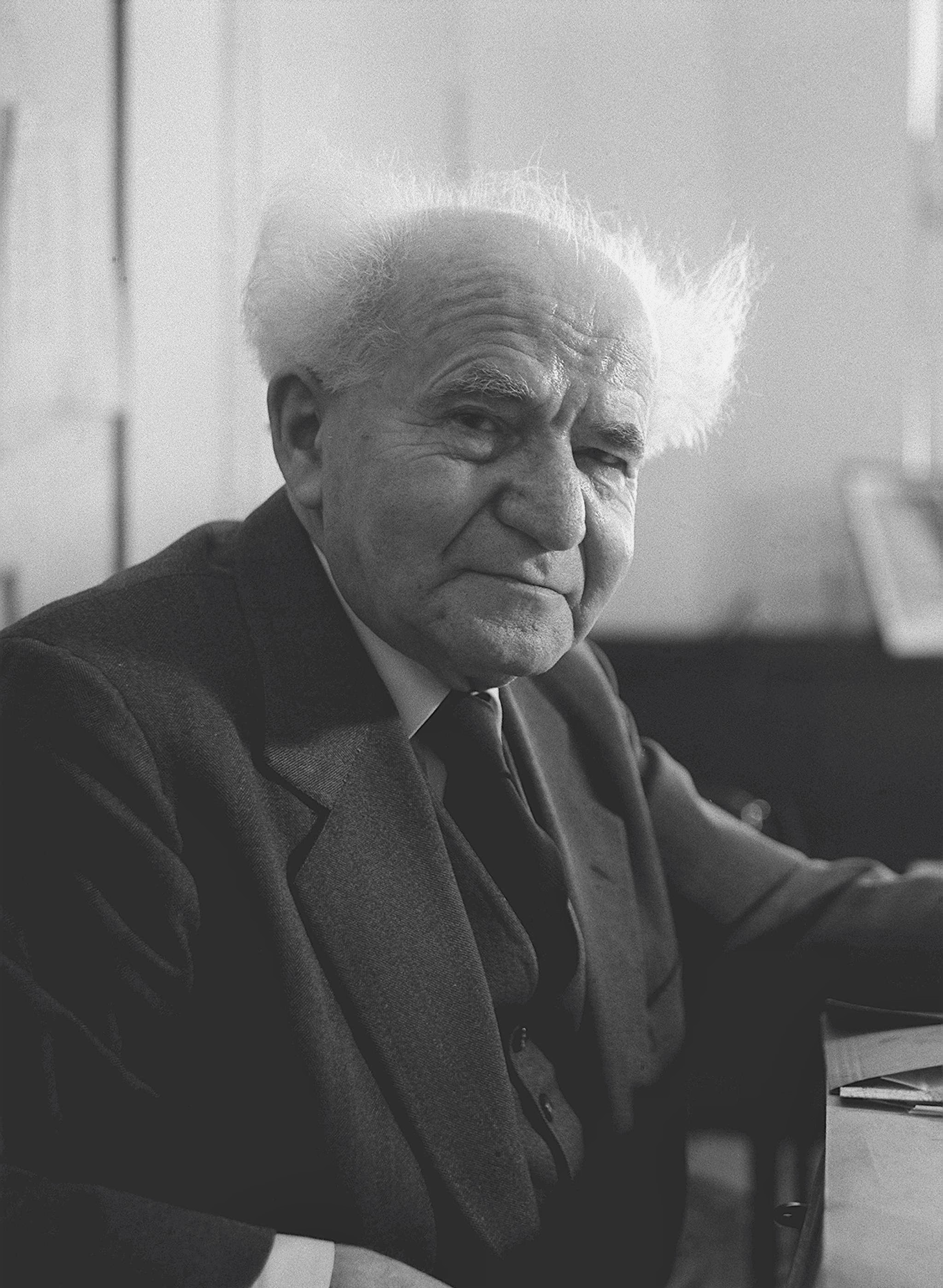
David Ben-Gurion, Founder of State of Israel

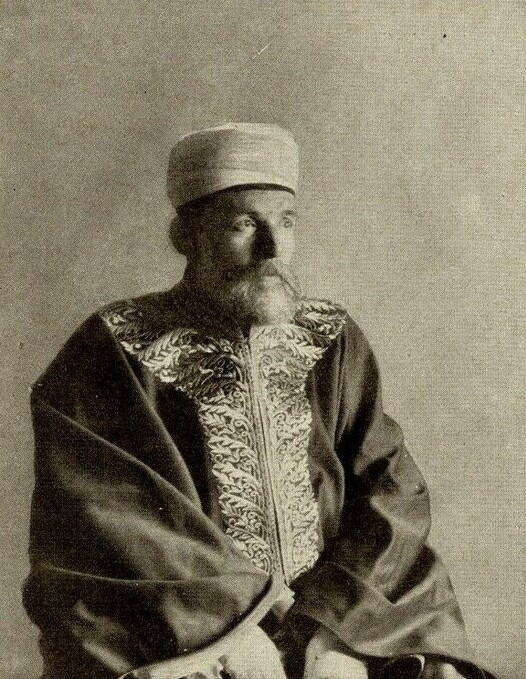
Mehmed Džemaludin Čaušević, Grand Mufti for Bosnia and Herzegovina
- Abdullah Gül – 11th President of Turkey (2007–2014)
- David Ben-Gurion – Founder and first Prime Minister of Israel
- Yitzhak Ben-Zvi – Longest-serving President of Israel (1952–1963)
- Ferruh Bozbeyli – 10th Speaker of the Grand National Assembly of Turkey
- Fuat Sirmen – Turkish legal expert and politician, Speaker of the Parliament (1961–1965)
- Nihat Erim – Turkish Prime Minister (1971–1972)
- Mehmed Džemaludin Čaušević, Grand Mufti for Bosnia and Herzegovina (1914-1930)
- Refik Saydam – Prime Minister of Turkey (1939–1942)
- Sadi Irmak – Prime Minister of Turkey (1974–1975)
- Suad Hayri Ürgüplü – Prime Minister of Turkey (1965–1966)
- Yıldırım Akbulut – Turkish Prime Minister (1989–1991)
- Moshe Sharett – Prime Minister of Israel (1954–1955)
- Cemil Çiçek – Former Turkish Minister of Justice and Speaker of the Parliament
- Arif Demirer – Former Minister of Finance
- Mehmet Ali Şahin – Former Minister of Justice and Deputy Prime Minister
- Ali Tanrıyar – Former Minister of Interior
- Coşkun Kırca – Former Minister of Foreign Affairs
- Erkan Mumcu – Former Minister of Culture and Tourism
- Hayati Yazıcı – Former Minister of Customs and Trade
- İhsan Sabri Çağlayangil – Former Minister of Foreign Affairs
- Kadir Topbaş – Former Mayor of Istanbul
- Köksal Toptan – Former Speaker of the Parliament
- Masud Sabri – Former Governor of Xinjiang Province, China
- Meral Akşener – Leader of Good Party and former Minister of Interior
- Murat Başesgioğlu – Former Minister of Labor and Social Security
- Mustafa Bey Barmada – Former Governor General of Aleppo
- Ramazan Özkepir — Current Turkish jurist
- Naci Ağbal – Former Minister of Finance
- Nimet Baş – Former Minister of National Education
- Abdi İpekçi – Journalist and editor-in-chief of Milliyet
- Ahmet Şık – Investigative journalist and author
- Halit Kıvanç – Turkish journalist and sports broadcaster
- Fatih Altaylı – Turkish columnist, TV host, and journalist
- Hrant Dink – Armenian-Turkish journalist and editor
- Metin Toker – Journalist and editor-in-charge of Akis
- Murat Belge – Writer, journalist and academic
- Nedim Şener – Investigative journalist and author
- Uğur Dündar – Journalist and TV producer
- Ahmet Mete Işıkara – Seismologist, advocate for earthquake preparedness
- Alp Ikizler – Nephrologist, recognized for contributions to kidney disease research
- Aykut Barka – Geologist specializing in fault lines in Turkey
- Aziz Sancar – Nobel Laureate in Chemistry (2015)
- Cavit Orhan Tütengil – Social scientist and columnist
- Engin Arık – Physicist known for work on high-energy physics
- Fuat Sezgin – Renowned historian of science, expert on Islamic Golden Age
- Hulusi Behçet – Dermatologist, first to describe Behçet's disease
- Nazım Terzioğlu – Mathematician known for contributions to algebra and analysis
- Muzafer Sherif – Turkish-American Social psychologist known for social conformity theories
- Nüzhet Gökdoğan – First female professor of astronomy in Turkey
- Paris Pişmiş – Armenian-Turkish astrophysicist
- Serdar Bulun – Medical doctor and scientist at Northwestern Feinberg School of Medicine
- Zeynel Mungan – Medical researcher at American Hospital Istanbul
- Ahmet Hamdi Tanpınar – Novelist, poet, and literary scholar and author of The Time Regulation Institute
- Ali Kurumahmut – Legal expert in maritime law
- Bahadır Kaleağası – International coordinator of TÜSİAD and author
- Duygu Asena – Feminist writer and journalist
- Mario Levi – Jewish-Turkish writer
- Mıgırdiç Margosyan – Armenian-Turkish author
- Nihal Atsız – Turkish author and poet
- İlhan Selçuk – Journalist, author and editor-in-chief of Cumhuriyet
- Orhan Pamuk – Nobel Laureate in Literature (2006)
- Reşat Nuri Güntekin – Novelist, author of Çalıkuşu
- Attila İlhan – Poet and novelist
- Onat Kutlar – Poet, writer, and co-founder of Turkish Cinema Archive
- Orhan Veli – Turkish poet
- Arif Mardin – Grammy-winning music producer
- Bülent Ortaçgil – Turkish singer and songwriter
- Candan Erçetin – Turkish singer and music educator
- Ceza – Turkish rapper
- Mercan Dede – Turkish Musician and DJ
- Sadettin Kaynak – Classical Turkish music composer and performer
- Sagopa Kajmer – Turkish rapper and hip-hop producer
- Teoman – Turkish rock singer and songwriter
- Burcu Esmersoy – Turkish model, TV personality and sports announcer

== Gallery ==
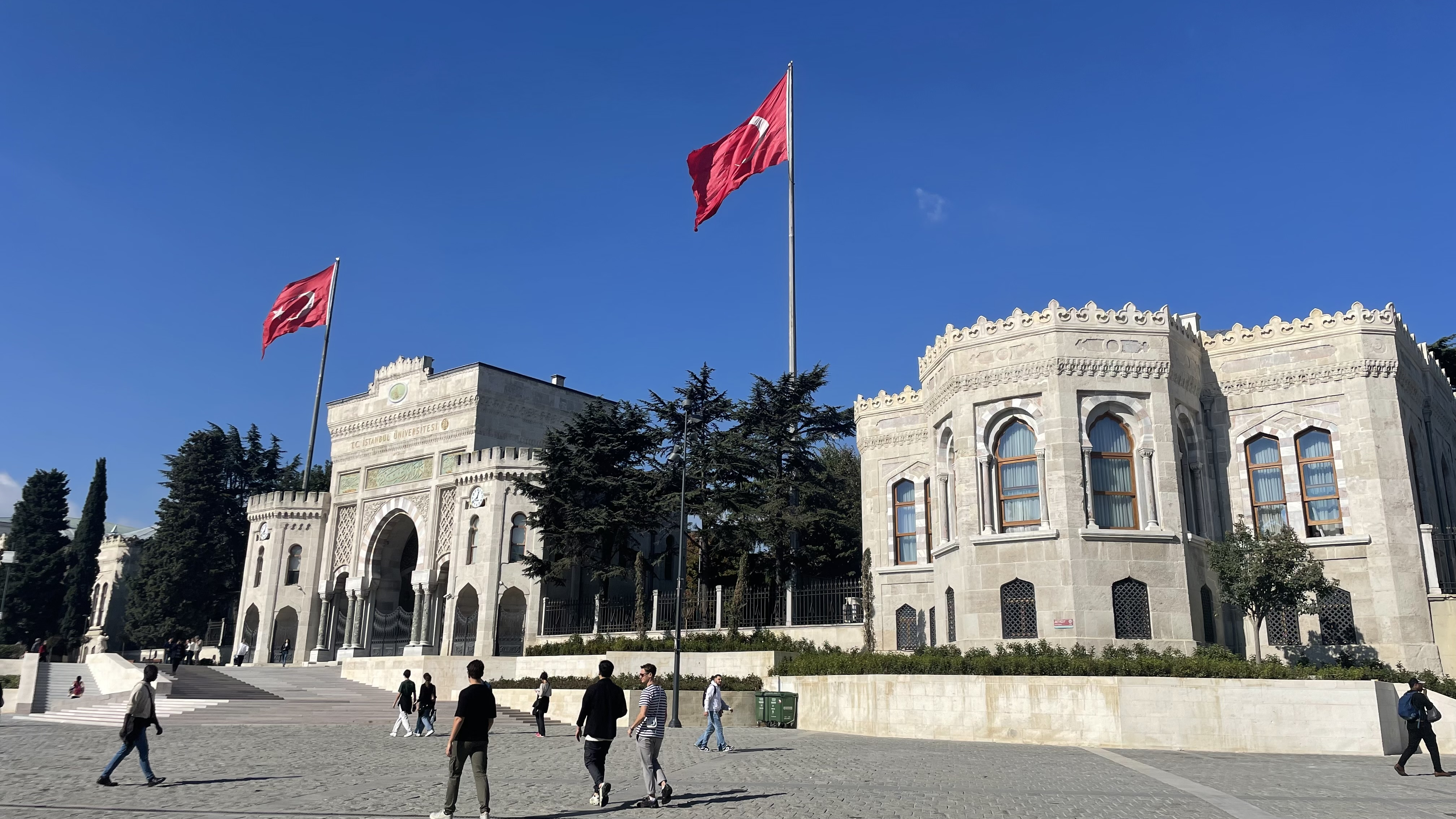
The Monumental Entrance Gate of the Istanbul University

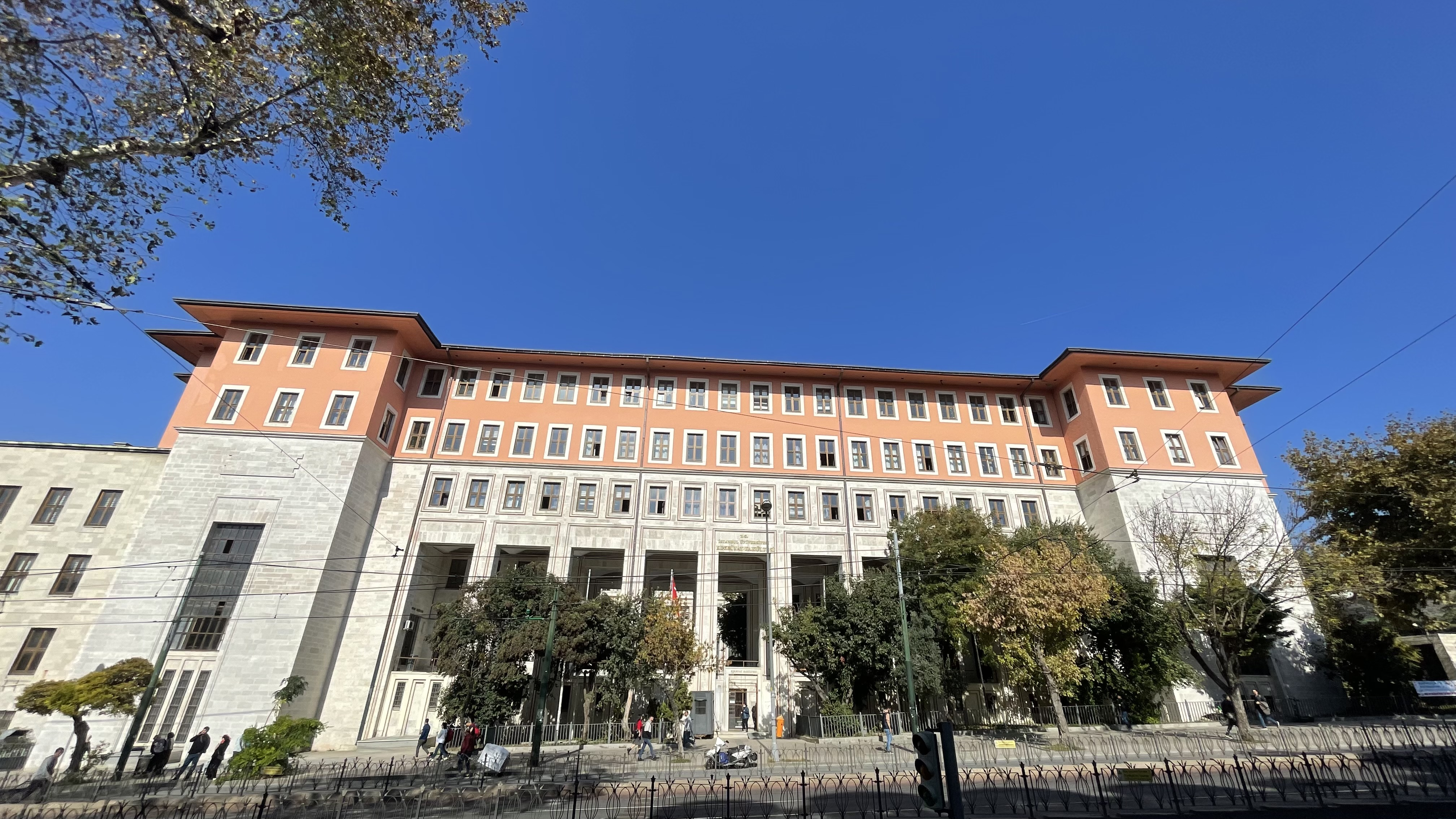
The Zeynep Hanım Mansion at Istanbul University Faculty of Literature

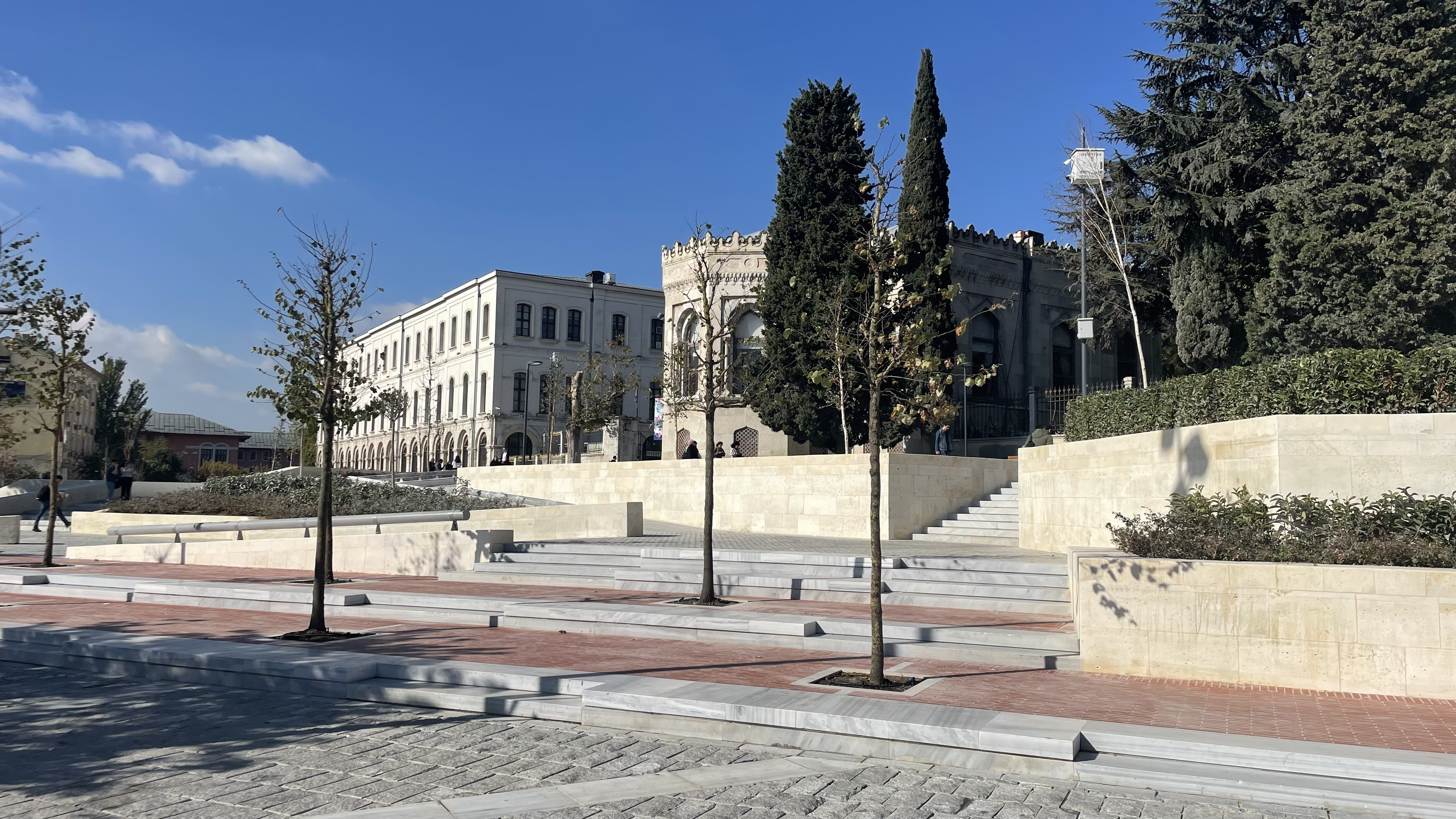
Istanbul University Faculty of Pharmacology

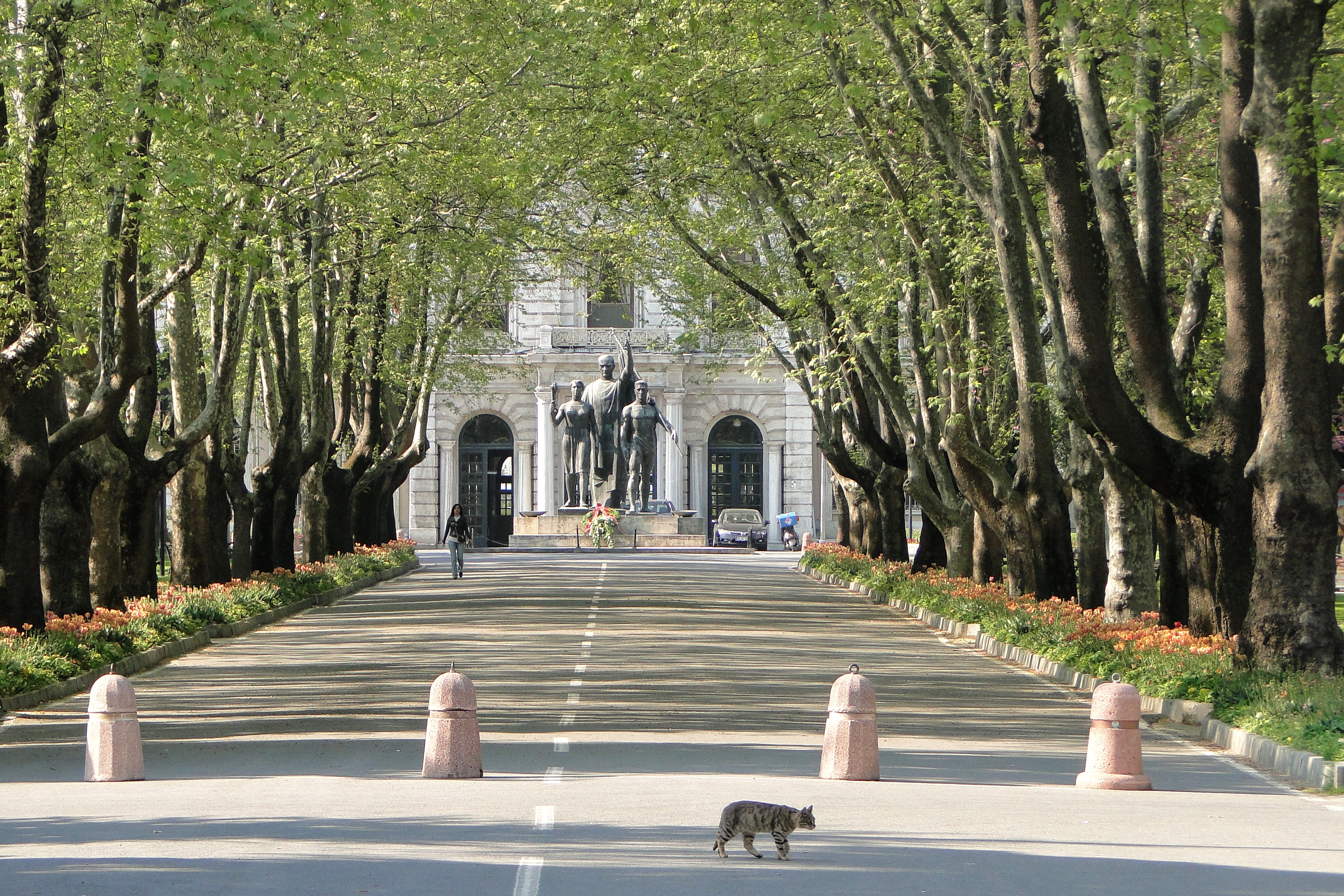
Istanbul University Beyazıt Campus

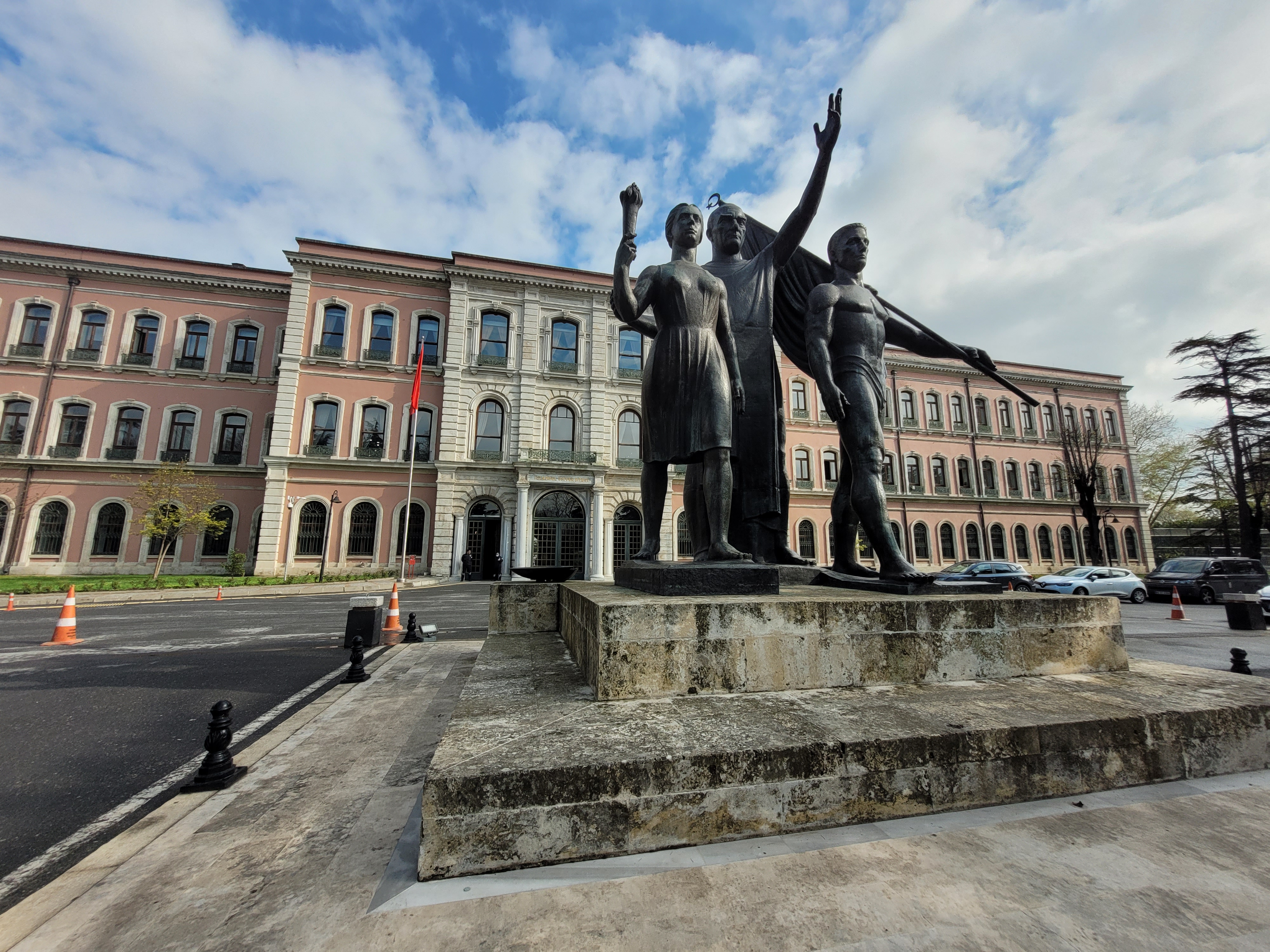
Istanbul University Rectorate

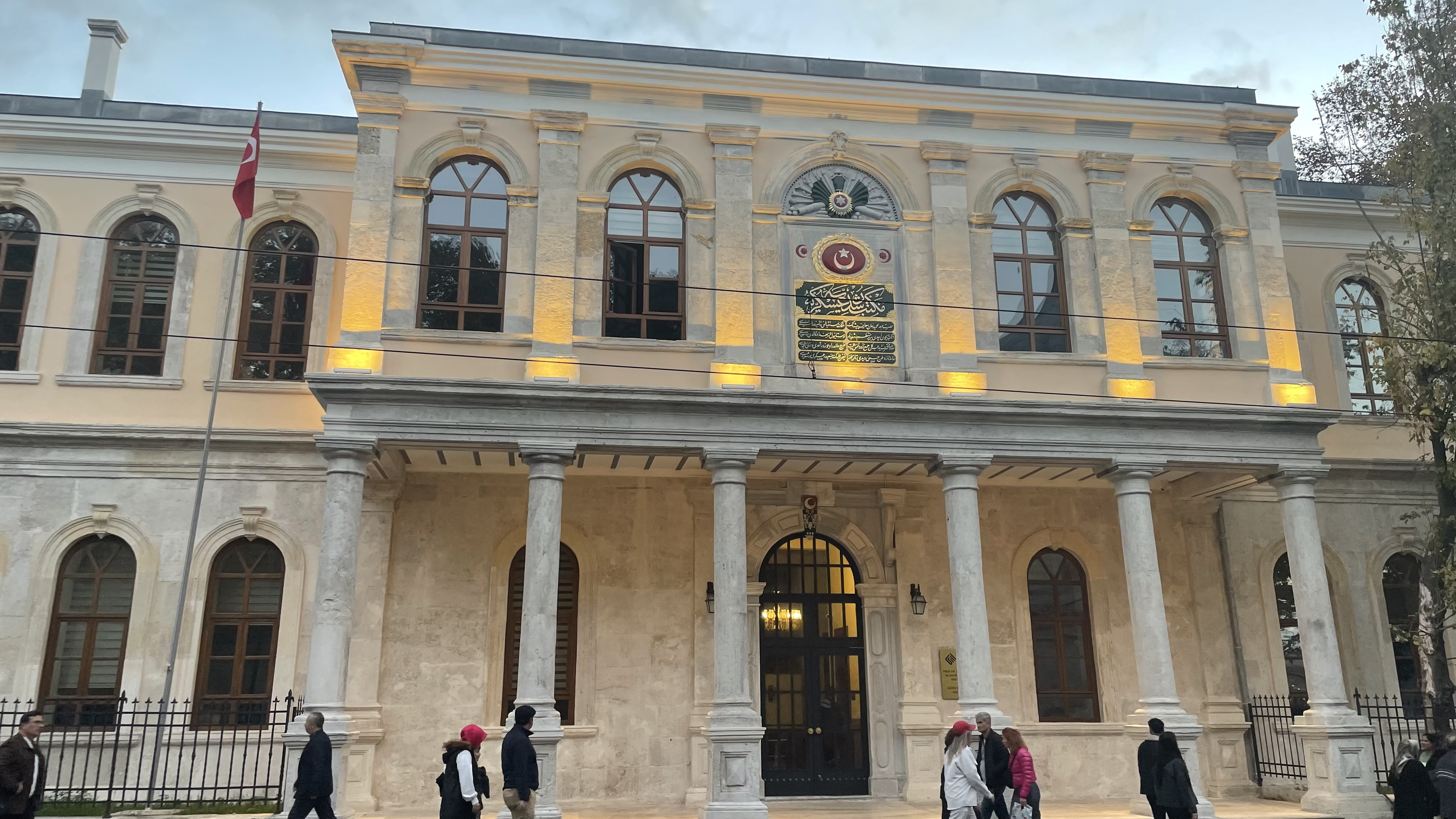
Istanbul University Faculty of Political Sciences Gülhane Building

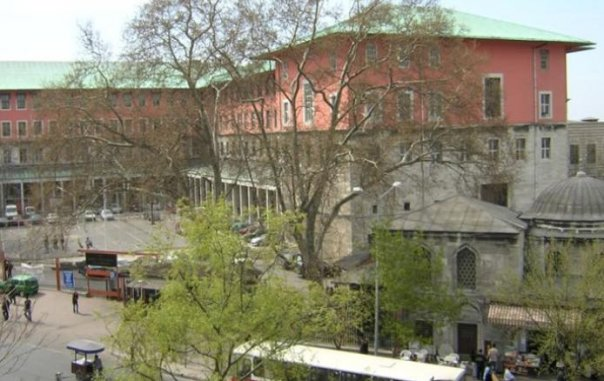
Istanbul University Faculty of Science

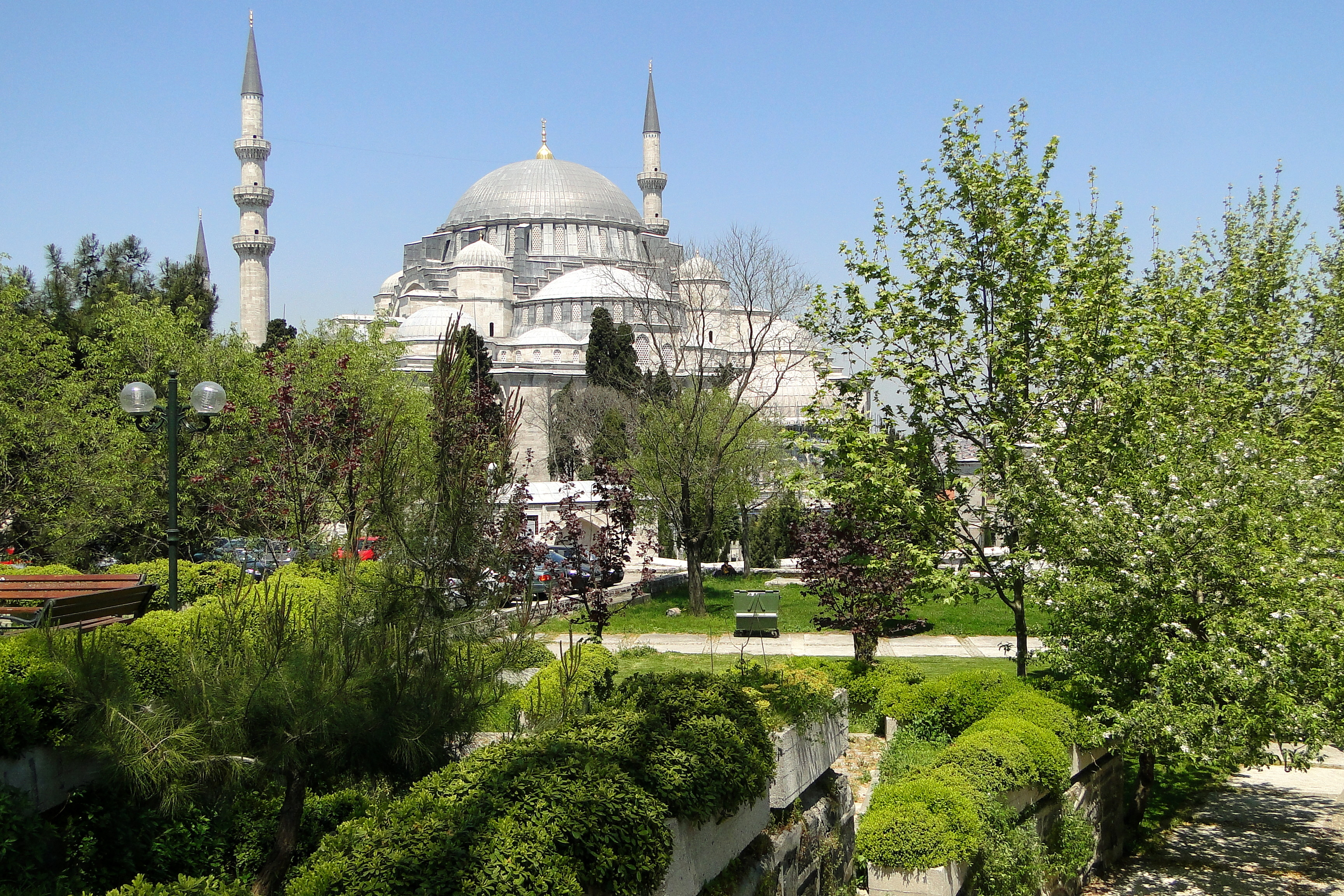
The Garden of Istanbul University, with the Süleymaniye Mosque

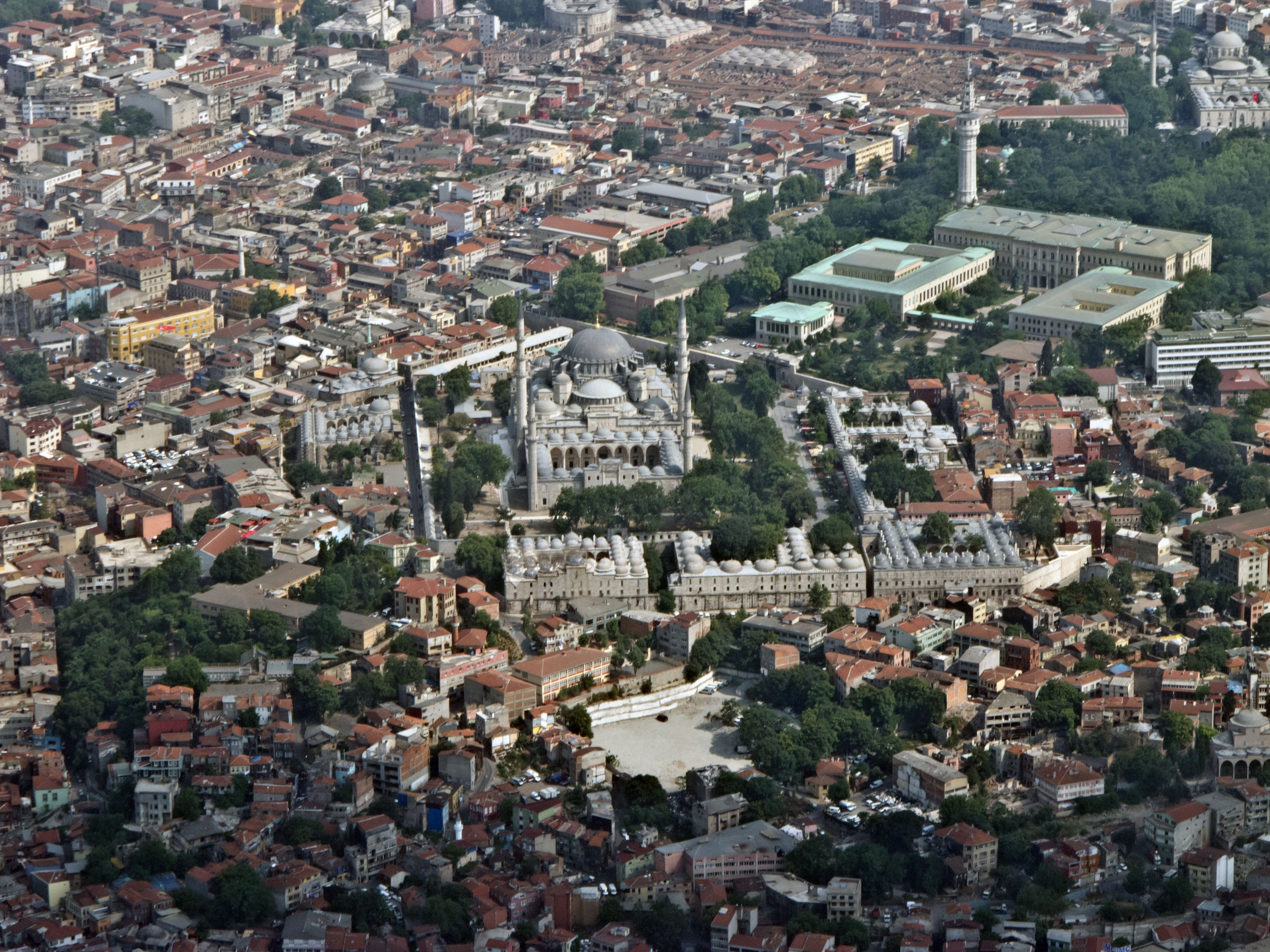
Aerial view of the Süleymaniye Mosque and Istanbul University

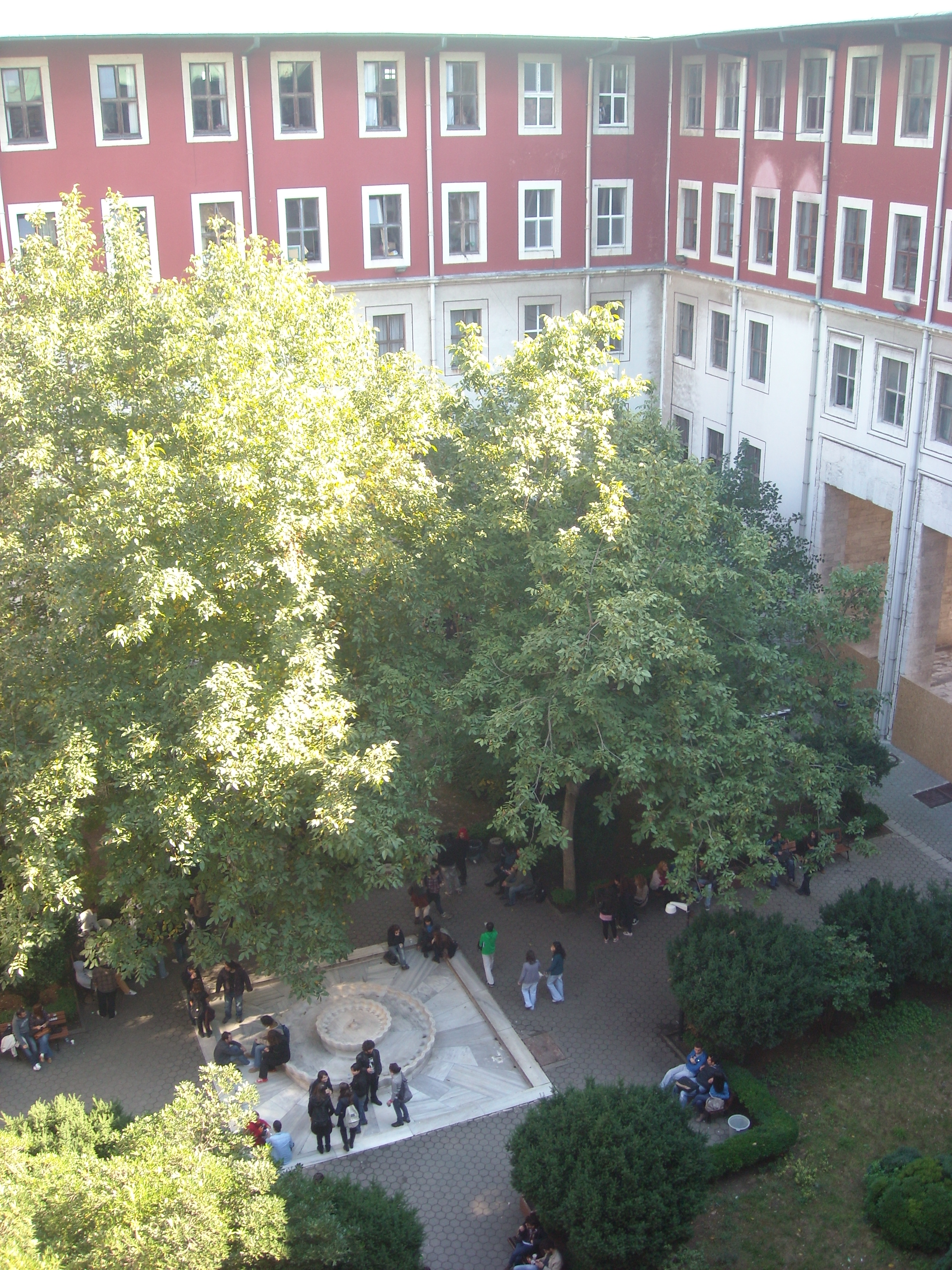
The Courtyard of Istanbul University Faculty of Literature

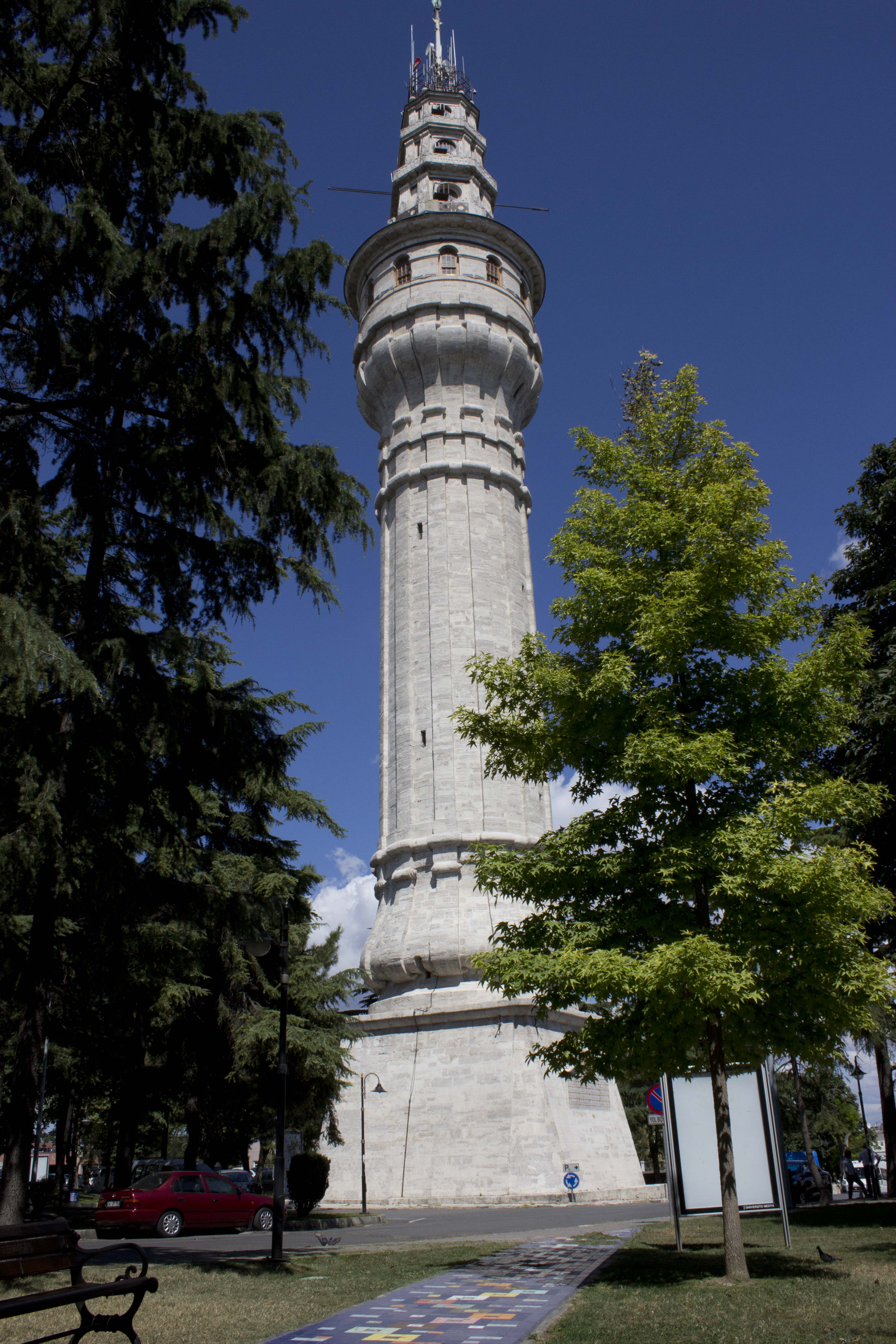
Beyazıt Tower in Istanbul University Main Campus

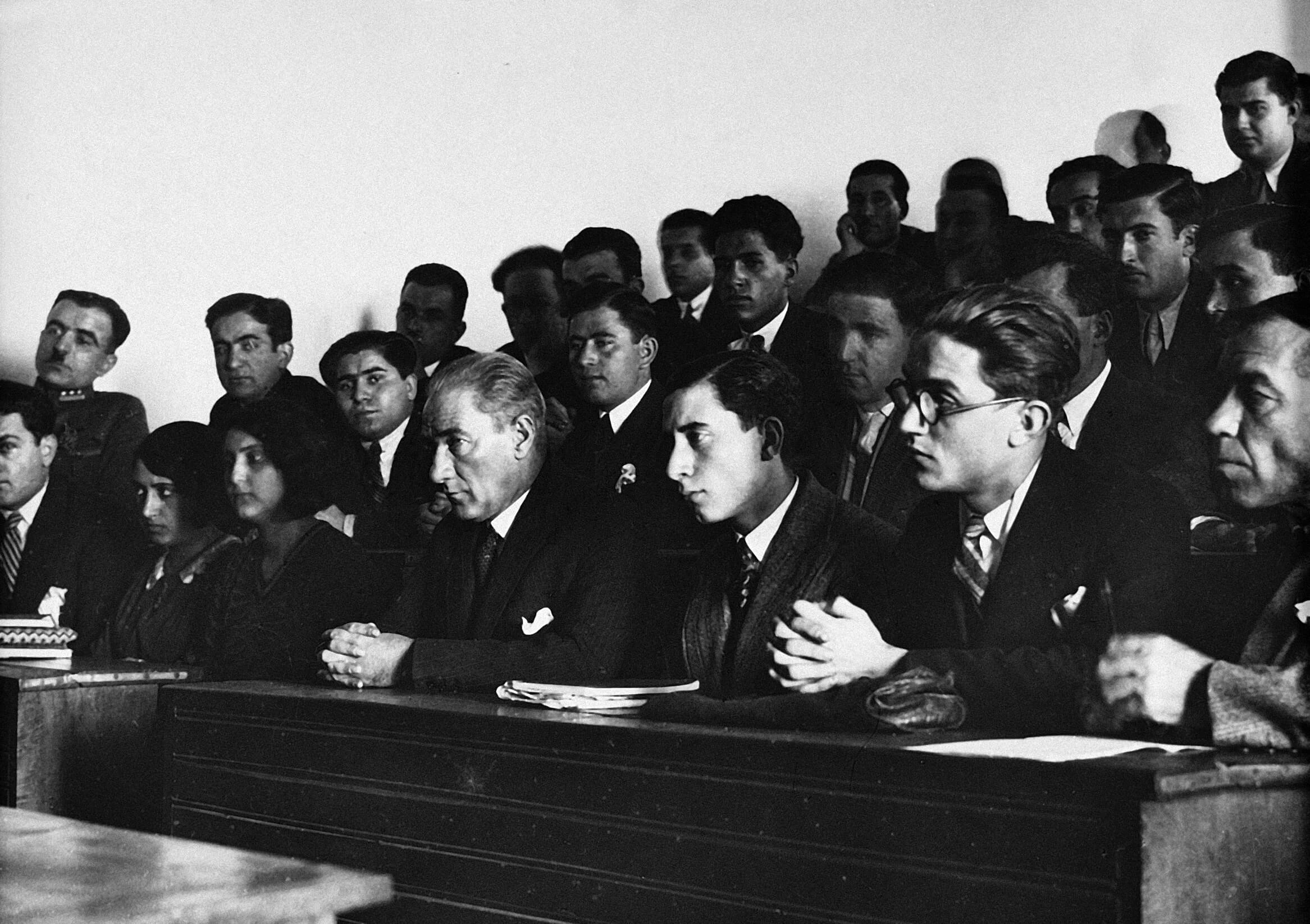
Mustafa Kemal Atatürk in Istanbul University Law School

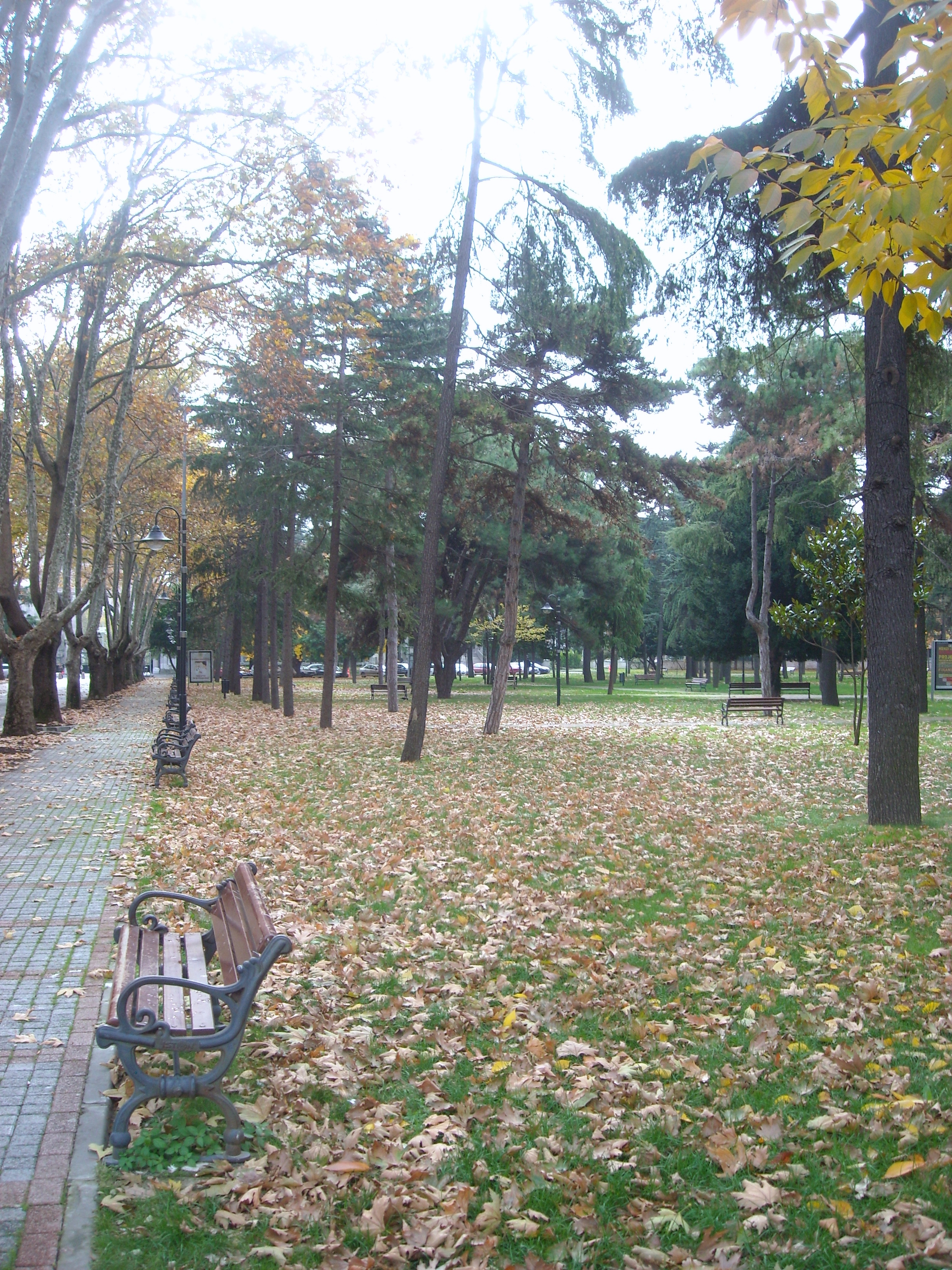
Istanbul University Beyazıt Campus

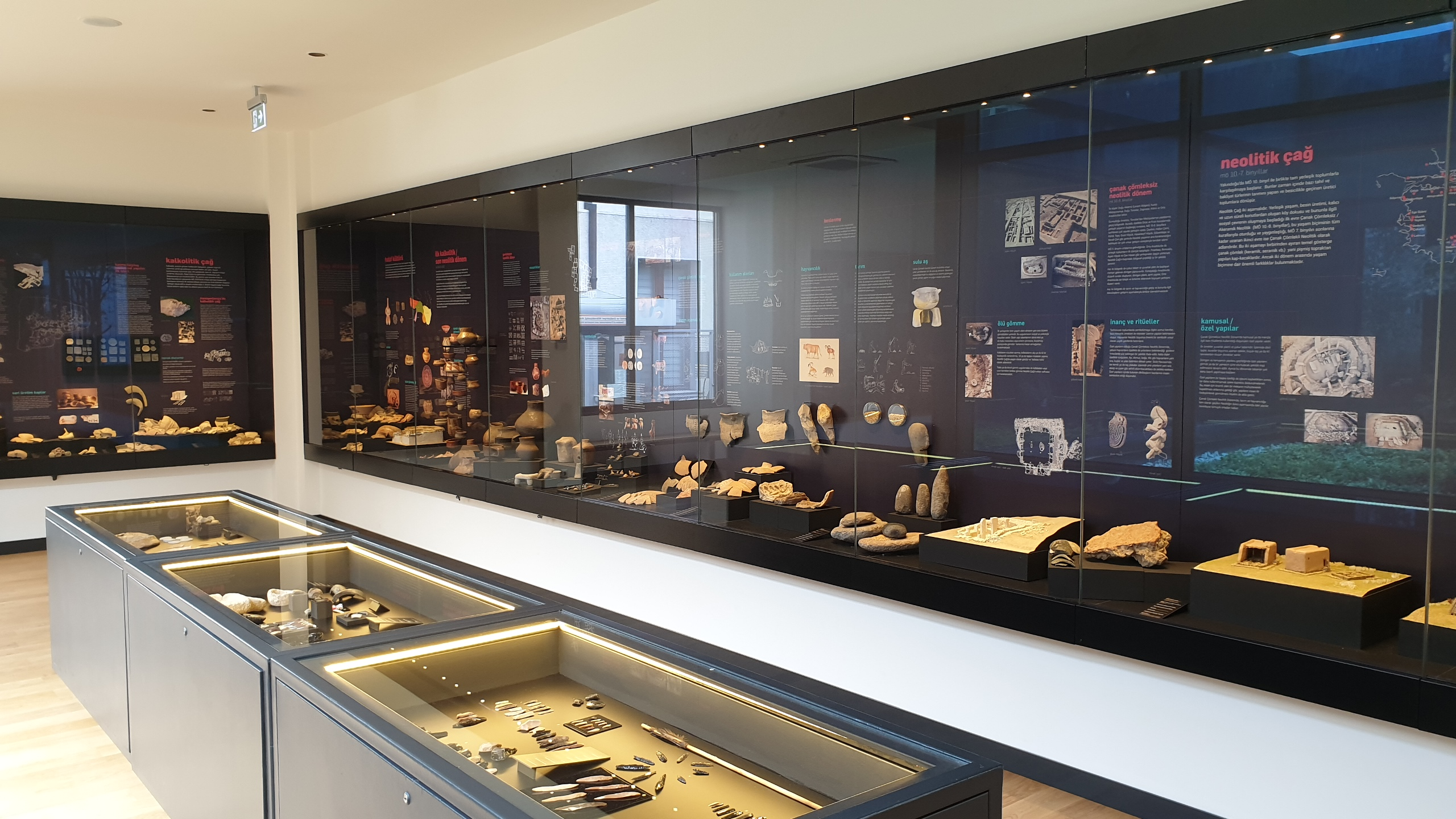
Istanbul University Rıdvan Çelikel Archaeological Museum

== See also ==
- Coimbra Group
- Istanbul University Faculty of Economics
- Istanbul University State Conservatory
- İstanbul Üniversitesi SK
- Istanbul Zoology Museum
- Atatürk Arboretum
- Istanbul University-Cerrahpaşa
- List of medieval universities
- Council of Higher Education (Turkey)
- YÖS exam
