= Lotte Loewe =

German chemist (born 1900)

- Born: 7 November 1900 (age 125); Wrocław
- Education: University of Breslau
- Occupation: Chemist
- Known for: Organic chemistry

Lotte Luise Friederike Loewe (7 November 1900–unknown) was a German chemist known for her published research in organic chemistry. She worked at the University of Wrocław, the University of Basel in Switzerland and then became an industrial chemist, working for J.R. Geigy AG firm in Basel. She held an assistant professorship at the University of Freiberg. Loewe was awarded the Bundesverdienstkreuz (Order of Merit of the Federal Republic of Germany).

== Life ==
Loewe was born in Breslau (then part of Germany and now called Wroclaw) to Helene (Druey) Loewe. She received her doctorate in chemistry from the University of Breslau (now the University of Wrocław) in 1927 and began her career there shortly thereafter, spending six years as a chemistry assistant from 1927 to 1933. She then moved to the University of Zurich in Switzerland for one year (1934) and then the University of Istanbul in Turkey for 21 years, from 1934 to 1955. Her last academic appointment was at the University of Basel, Switzerland, where she spent six years from 1955 to 1961.

Loewe then became an industrial chemist for the J.R. Geigy AG firm in Basel, though she maintained a position as an assistant professor at the University of Freiberg. Throughout, her research concerned ascorbic acid reaction kinetics, uric acid, carotenoids, keto-enol tautomerism, and diazomethane reactions.

Loewe was a member of the German Academic Union, Swiss Academic Union, the German Chemical Society, the Swiss Chemical Society, and the Swiss Microanalytic Society. She was awarded the Bundesverdienstkreuz (Order of Merit of the Federal Republic of Germany) in 1955.

== Selected works ==
- Arndt, F., Loewe, L., Ün, R., & Ayça, E. (1951). Coumarin diol and coumarin chromone tautomerism. Chemical Reports, 84 (3), 319-329.
- Arndt, F., Loewe, L., & Ayça, E. (1951). Thiacoumarin diol and its derivatives. Chemical Reports, 84 (3), 329-332.
- Arndt, F., Loewe, L., & Ayça, E. (1951). Oxidation rates of enediols. Chemical Reports, 84 (3), 333-342.
- Arndt, F., Loewe, L., & Ayca, E. (1952). Via the iron (III) chloride reaction of the enediols. Chemical Reports, 85 (12), 1150-1160.
- Dahn, H., & Loewe, L. (1960). On the Oxidation of Ascorbic Acid by Nitrous Acid Part IV: The Zero Order Reaction. 16. Communication on reductones and tricarbonyl compounds. Helvetica Chimica Acta, 43 (1), 310-317.
- Dahn, H., Loewe, L., & Rotzler, G. (1960). The acidity function J0 of perchloric acid in dioxane / water. Chemical Reports, 93 (7), 1572-1578.
- Dahn, H., Loewe, L., & Bunton, CA (1960). On the oxidation of ascorbic acid by nitrous acid, part VI: overview and discussion of the results. 18. Communication on reductones and 1, 2, 3-tricarbonyl compounds. Helvetica Chimica Acta, 43 (1), 320-333.
- Arndt, Fernando & Loewe, Lotte & Beyer, Bahriye. (2006). On the acidity and diazomethane reaction of the C-methyl acetoacetic ester. Reports of the German Chemical Society (A and B Series). 74. 1460 - 1464. 10.1002/cber.19410740817.
