= Seminars in Reproductive Medicine =

Medical journal

- Discipline: Reproductive medicine
- Language: English
- Edited by: Richard S. Legro; James Segars

Publication details
- Former name: Seminars in Reproductive Endocrinology
- History: 1983–present
- Publisher: Thieme Medical Publishers
- Frequency: Bimonthly
- Impact factor: 2.585 (2018)

Standard abbreviations
- ISO 4: Semin. Reprod. Med.

Indexing
- ISSN: 1526-8004 (print); 1526-4564 (web)
- OCLC no.: 832835179

Links
- Journal homepage; Online archive

Seminars in Reproductive Medicine is a bimonthly peer-reviewed medical review journal covering the field of reproductive medicine. It was established in 1983 as Seminars in Reproductive Endocrinology, obtaining its current name in 2000. It is published by Thieme Medical Publishers and the editors-in-chief are Richard S. Legro and James Segars. According to the Journal Citation Reports, the journal has a 2018 impact factor of 2.585.
