= Istanbul Tanpınar Literature Festival =

International literary event

The logo of the Festival

The Istanbul International Literature Festival (Turkish: İstanbul Tanpınar Edebiyat Festivali, ITEF), is an international literary event held in the city of Istanbul to focus on a variety of genres, and to bring together writers, publishers, literary translators, critics and journalists for a series of inspirational encounters. It is named after Ahmet Hamdi Tanpınar.

== Participating authors ==
Attracting many important international literary figures, its six-day program, starting at the end of May, now features many events including panels, workshops and concerts.

The festival is planning to include events for children and young people.

=== 2009 ===
The first festival was held from 31 October to 3 November 2009. With 32 countries taking part, the foreign participation accounted for 50 authors out of the total of 83.

2009 Festival Theme: City and Time

Visiting authors:

Abdelhay Moudden, Adam Fawer, Adela Greceanu, Adisa Bašić, Aleksandra Dimitrova, Alek Popov, Alev Aksoy Croutier, Anahit Hayrapetyan, Andrej Blatnik, Andrew Miller, Aslı Tohumcu, Ayfer Tunç, Barış Müstecaplıoğlu, Bernardo Atxaga, Berrin Karakaş, Can Eryümlü, Carme Riera, Christos Chryssopoulos, Clare Azzopardi, Claudiu Komartin, Cristina Fernandez Cubas, Çiler İlhan, Dan Lungu, Deniz Kavukçuoğlu, Diana Ferrus, Efe Duyan, Fırat Ceweri, Frank Westerman, Geert Mak, Gökçenur Ç., Gonca Özmen, Gönül Kıvılcım, Gül İrepoğlu, Gündüz Vassaf, Hakan Günday, Hakan Yel, Hallgrimur Helgason, Hande Altaylı, Hava Pinchas Cohen, Igor Isakovski, Ingo Schulze, Ivan Hristov, Jaklin Çelik, Jessica Lutz, Kang Sok Kyong, Karin Karakaşlı, Katerina Iliopoulou, Kürşat Başar, Lasana M. Sekou, Liz Behmoaras, Lyudmila Filipova, Mario Levi, Maureen Freely, Marko Pogačar, Mehmet Açar, Milan Dobričić, Mima Simić, Mine Kırıkkanat, Mine Söğüt, Mirt Komel, Nawal El Saadawi, Netalie Braun, Norman Manea, Olga Tokarczuk, Olivier Rolin, Owen Martell, Peter Pistanek, Petr Borkovec, Ragıp Zarakolu, Raman Mundair, Reha Çamuroğlu, Serdar Özkan, Shimon Adaf, Solmaz Kamuran, Tuna Kiremitçi, Valter Hugo Mãe, Yaprak Öz.

=== 2010 ===
2010 Festival Theme: "City and Human"

Visiting authors:

Adnan Binyazar, Ahmet Altan, Ahmet Tulgar, Ahmet Ümit, Alexandra Schwartzbrod, Anil Ramdas, Arnon Grunberg, Ayfer Tunç, Ayşegül Çelik, Baha Taher, Behiç Ak, Bejan Matur, Berrin Karakaş, Buket Uzuner, Caterina Bonvicini, Cem Selcen, Çiler İlhan, Dacia Maraini, Dubravka Ugresic, Dumitru Tepeneag, Dzevad Karahasan, Ece Erdoğuş, Ellah Allfrey, Eric-Emmanuel Schmitt, Etgar Keret, Evald Flisar, Fanny Joly, George Blecher, Georgi Gospodinov, Gündüz Vassaf, György Dragoman, Hakan Bıçakçı, Hakan Günday, Hamdi Koç, Hamid Ziarati, Hande Altaylı, Hassan Daoud, İpek Çalışlar, Jacek Dehnel, Josef Winkler, Leonard Durso, Luan Starova, Marco Ansaldo, Mari Strachan, Mario Levi, Mariolina Venezia, Mehmet Coral, Melida Tüzünoğlu, Mine G. Kırıkkanat, Mine Soysal, Murat Belge, Müge İplikçi, Oya Baydar, Ömer Özgüner, Özlem Kumrular, Pirjo Hassinen, Ramsey Nasr, Ronelda Kamfer, Ryo Kuroki, Sadık Yalsızuçanlar, Sevinç Çokum, Tuna Kiremitçi, Vincenzo Cerami, Vladimir Makanin, Yalvaç Ural, Yasemin Taşkın, Yekta Kopan, Youssef Ziedan, Zülfü Livaneli.

=== 2011 ===
2011 Festival Theme: "City and Food"

Visiting authors:

Adam Foulds, Ahmet Ümit, Alona Kimhi, Antoine Westermann, Antti Tuuri, Artun Ünsal, Aslı Perker, Barış Müstecaplıoğlu, Berrin Karakaş, Cem Akaş, Charles Den Tex, Claire Franek, Claude Helft, Çiler İlhan, Doğan Hızlan, Ece Erdoğuş, Ellah Allfrey, Fatih Erdoğan, Gabriela Adameşteanu, Gökçe Ateş Aytuğ, Gönül Kıvılcım, Gül İrepoğlu, Hacer Yeni, Hakan Günday, Hande Altaylı, Hanif Kureishi, İpek Çalışlar, Jasmin Ramadan, Jean Orizet, Josefine Klougart, Kaan Sezyum, Krisztián Grecsó, Liz Behmoaras, Mario Levi, Marjolijn Hof, Mark Crick, Mircea Dinescu, Muhsin Kızılkaya, Özdemir İnce, Özlem Kumrular, Péter Zilahy, Reha Çamuroğlu, Sadık Yalsızuçanlar, Selim İleri, Shifra Horn, Silvia Ronchey, Tatiana Salem Levy, Thilo Tiffany Murray, Timothée de Fombelle, Vladislav Bajac, Zülfü Livaneli.

=== 2012 ===
2012 Festival Theme: "City and Fear"

Visiting authors:

Adnan Binyazar, Adriaan van Dis, Antjie Krog, Aslı E. Perker, Ayfer Tunç, Ayşe Ünal Ersönmez, Ayşegül Çelik, Barış Müstecaplıoğlu, Başak Sayan, Burcu Duman, Burhan Sönmez, Can Eryümlü, Çiğdem y Mirol, Doğu Yücel, Ece Temelkuran, Elif Bereketli, Elif Tanrıyar, Emrah Polat, Esra Kılıç, Filiz Aygündüz, Galip Dursun, Gem Ahmet, Gerbrand Bakker, Guy Bass, Gülenay Börekçi, Gülşah Elikbank, Hakan Günday, Hakan Yaman, Herman Koch, İan Rankin, İdil Önemli, İnci Aral, Kader Abdolah, Karin Karakaşlı, Laia Fabregas, Louis de Bernieres, Marjolijn Hof, Mehmet Erte, Menekşe Toprak, Murathan Mungan, Müge Gürsoy Sökmen, Nermin Yıldırım, Neslihan Acu, Onat Bahadır, Ömer Erdem, Rodaan Al Galidi, Sadık Yalsızuçanlar, Sevin Okyay, Sina Baydur, Stine Jensen, Tuna Kiremitçi, Yekta Kopan, Yiğit Değer Bengi.

=== 2013 ===
2013 Festival Theme: "City and Game"

Visiting authors:
Alberto Manguel, Ahmet Ümit, Andrea Winkler, Antonia Michaelis, Aslı E. Perker, Barbara Stok, Barış Müstecaplıoğlu, Bibi Dumon Tak, Bülent Somay, Can Evrenol, Conor Kostick, Çiler İlhan, Damian Barr, David Peace, Doğu Yücel, Ece Temelkuran, Emre Soyak, Erbuğ Kaya, Ercüment Cengiz, Eshkol Nevo, Eva Petric, Franziska Gehm, Galip Dursun, Gülşah Elikbank, Hakan Bıçakçı, Hakan Yaman, Hamdi Koç, Hasan Çolakoğlu, Hikmet Hükümenoğlu, Jan van Mersbergen, José Oliver, Katja Lange Müller, Kayra Küpçü, Kutlukhan Kutlu, Mario Levi, Martin Rowson, Milan Jazbec, Mona Yahia, Murat Işık, Murathan Mungan, Nermin Bezmen, Nermin Yıldırım, Nicholaus Patnaude, Olivier Mauco, Onur Caymaz, Oya Baydar, Ömer Erdem, Patrice Desilets, Sabri Gürses, Sadık Yalsızuçanlar, Sandra Hili Vassallo, Selma Lønning Aarø, Sevin Okyay, Sophie Smiley, Suzanne Joinson, Teresa Präauer, Thomas Stangl, Viktor Horvath, Yekta Kopan, Yiğit Bener.

=== 2014 ===
2014 Festival Theme: "City and Journey"

Visiting authors:

Adam Pekalski, Alison Pick, Andrzej Bart, Asa Lind, Ayşegül Devecioğlu, Barış Müstecaplıoğlu, Belma Fırat, Buket Şahin, Burhan Sönmez, Can Evrenol, Carl Johan Vallgren, Carles Sala i Vila, Defne Koryürek, Devrim Kunter, Douwe Draaisma, Ece Temelkuran, Eleanor Watchtel, Elif Tanrıyar, Engin Kaban, Ercan Kesal, Esra Düzdağ, Ezel Akay, Fatima Sharafeddine, Fehim Işık, Galip Dursun, Gülay Er Pasin, Gülbike Berkkam, Hakan Bıçakcı, Halil İbrahim Özcan, Handan Durgut, Honggyu Son, Inka Parei, İkna Sarıarslan, İnci Aral, Joanna Olech, Jürgen Banscherus, Kutlukhan Kutlu, Levent Şenyürek, Maksut Aşkar, Maritgen Matter, Mehmet Berk Yaltırık, Murat Belge, Murat Menteş, Nermin Yıldırım, Nihan Sayın, Nükhet Eren, Okan Okumuş, Onat Bahadır, Ömürden Sezgin, Sedat Demir, Sedat Girgin, Sevengül Sönmez, Sezgin Kaymaz, Sophie Dieuaide, Tangör Tan, Tarık Günersel, Tuba Şatana, Vincent Lam, Wojciech Kuczok, Yekta Kopan, Yiğit Değer Bengi, Zygmunt Miłoszewski.

2014 Literature In The Kitchen:

Ahmet Yaşar, Artun Ünsal, Aylin Öney TAN, Bahri Vardarlılar, Ece Vahapoğlu, Gül İrepoğlu, İlhan Eksen, Kemalettin Kuzucu, Marianna Yerasimos, Mario Levi, Mary Işın, Mustafa Duman, Nazlı Pişkin, Nedim Atilla, Nevin Halıcı, Nilhan Aras, Özge Samancı, Sabri Koz, Sahrap Soysal, Sevim Gökyıldız, Sula Bozis, Yavuz Dizdar.

2014 İTEF Child:

Ayda Kantar, Aytül Akal, Çiğdem Gündeş, Çiğdem Odabaşı, Fatih Erdoğan, Görkem Yeltan, İpek Kuşçu, Melek Özlem Sezer, Mustafa Delioğlu, Sara Şahinkanat, Seza Kutlar Aksoy, Simla Sunay, Toprak Işık, Tülin Kozikoğlu.
