= Cattaneo Castle =

- Castello Cattaneo (Italian)
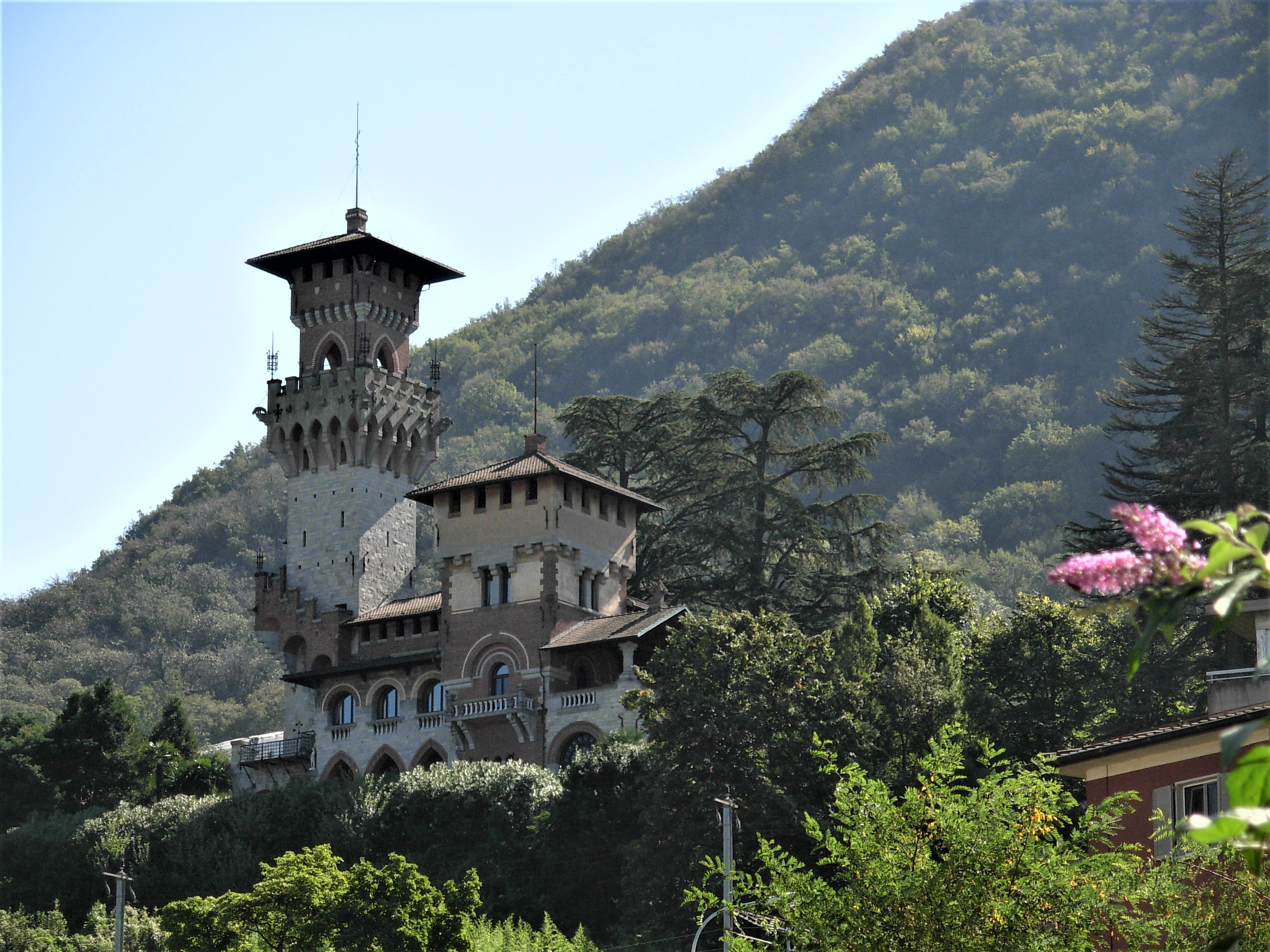
- Cattaneo Castle in 2014
- Click on the map for a fullscreen view

General information
- Location: Lugano, Switzerland
- Coordinates: 45°59′20.62″N 8°56′56.9″E

Cattaneo Castle (Italian: Castello Cattaneo), also known as Villa Cattaneo, is a historic building located in Paradiso, near Lugano, in Switzerland.

== History ==
The villa was built between 1908 and 1911 to the design of Florentine architect Gino Coppedè by the shipowner Emilio Cattaneo, a native of Ticino who had lived for many years in Genoa. Emilio's daughter, Carlotta, married into the Dionisotti family and gave birth to the philologist, historian, and literary critic Carlo Dionisotti.

In 2010, the property was sold to the reclusive Danish enzyme billionaire Ib Nymark Hegelund for 20 million Swiss francs.

The building is listed in the Swiss Inventory of Cultural Property of Regional Significance.

== Description ==
The villa stands on the slopes of Monte San Salvatore, overlooking Lake Lugano.

The building was conceived to resemble a castle, following a model that Coppedè had already successfully developed with the Mackenzie Castle and Türcke Castle in Genoa, as well as Villa Rolandi-Ricci in Lido di Camaiore, Versilia. Designed in a Medieval Revival style inspired by Florentine architecture, it is considered one of the most significant historicist castles in Switzerland. Its façades are distinguished by their striking polychromy, achieved through the use of contrasting materials such as brick and natural stone.
