= ITEF =

ITEF may refer to:

- İstanbul Tanpınar Edebiyat Festivali, or Istanbul Tanpınar Literature Festival
- Jeová Rafá Theological Institute
