= Olech =

Olech is a surname which is common in Poland. It also appears in Ukraine but is more commonly transliterated as Olekh (Ukrainian: Олех). Notable people with the surname include:

- Artur Olech (1940–2010), Polish boxer
- Czesław Olech (1931–2015), Polish mathematician
- Janusz Olech (born 1965), Polish fencer
- Jarosław Olech (born 1974), Polish powerlifter
- Joanna Olech (born 1955), Polish author
- Kazimierz "Waldek" Waldemar Olech (1928–2016), Polish mountaineer
- Maria Olech (born 1941), Polish Antarctic scientist
- Viktoriya Olekh (born 1993), Ukrainian skier
- Lee Olech (1949–2016), American scientist
