= Türcke Castle =

- Castello Türcke (Italian)
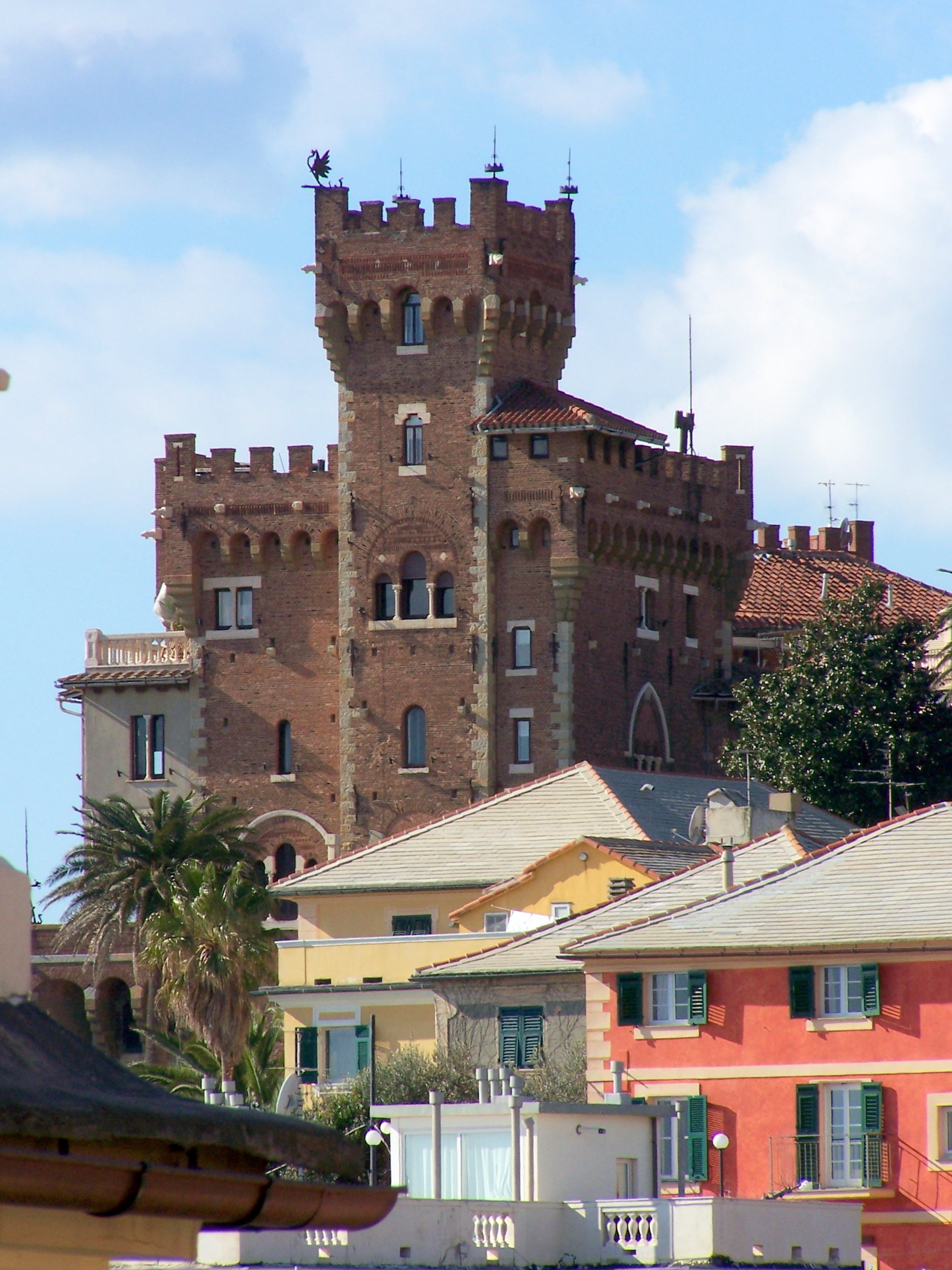
- Türcke Castle in 2006
- Click on the map for a fullscreen view

General information
- Location: Genoa, Italy
- Coordinates: 44°23′25.31″N 8°58′39.3″E

Türcke Castle (Italian: Castello Türcke) is a historic villa located in Genoa, Italy.

== History ==
The villa was built in 1903 based on a design by the Florentine architect Gino Coppedè, commissioned by the Swiss engineer Giovanni Türcke.

Two years after the death of engineer Türcke in 1917, his heirs sold the castle to W. Homberger. He expanded the property by purchasing several plots of land in 1921 and 1925, significantly increasing the size of the garden.

== Description ==
The building reproduces the features of a true castle, following a model already tested by Coppedè with Mackenzie Castle in Genoa and later reused in several of his subsequent projects.
