= Night and Fog (disambiguation) =

Night and Fog (Nacht und Nebel) was a directive issued by Adolf Hitler on December 7, 1941.

Night and Fog may also refer to:

- Night and Fog (1956 film), a French documentary short
- Night and Fog (2009 film), a Hong Kong crime drama
- "Night and Fog", a 1993 episode of Law & Order
- "Night and Fog", part of Bloodties, a 1993 Avengers/X-Men comics crossover

== See also ==
- Night and Fog in Japan, a 1960 Japanese drama film
- Night and Fog in Zona, a 2015 South Korean documentary
- Nacht und Nebel (band), a 1980s Belgian synthpop group
- Fog and Night, a 2007 Turkish adventure film
