= Villa Pessina =

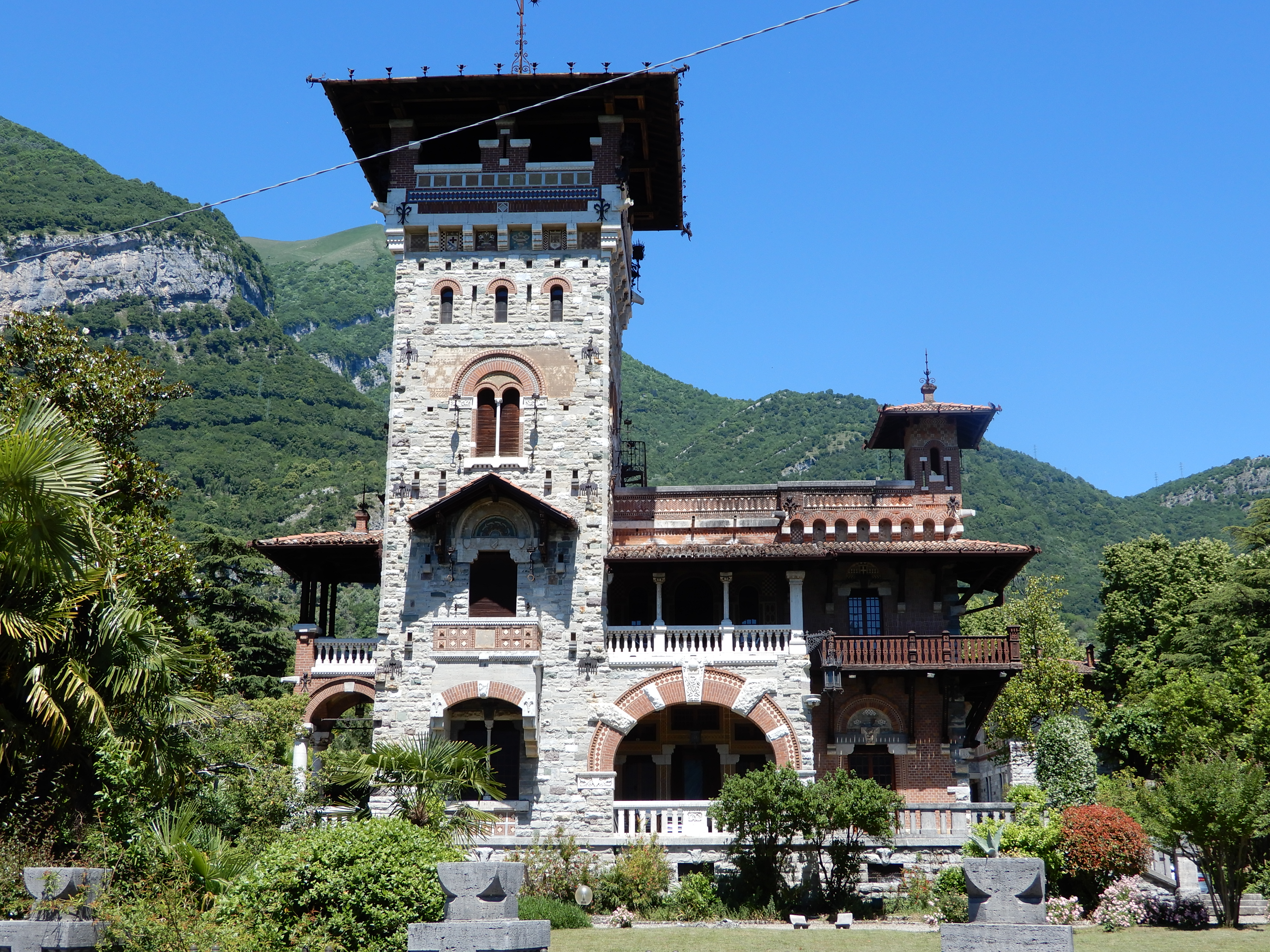
- Villa Pessina in Tremezzo
- Click on the map for a fullscreen view

General information
- Architectural style: Eclectic
- Location: Tremezzo, Italy
- Coordinates: 45°58′53″N 9°12′41″E

Villa Pessina is an eclectic villa located in Tremezzo on the shores of Lake Como, Italy.

== History ==
The villa was built in the 1920s on behalf of the Pessina family. The identity of its designers is not confidently known, nevertheless its stylistic similarity to the more famous Villa La Gaeta, designed by brothers Gino and Adolfo Coppedè, has fueled over the years numerous plagiarism allegations. It is known, instead, that the villa was built by the same construction company that built Villa La Gaeta.

== Description ==
The building features an eclectic style that combines Gothic Revival and Art Nouveau elements. Light stone, bricks and wood are used in the façades in the decoration. A large tower with biforas crowned by a loggia characterizes the façade overlooking the lake.

== Gallery ==
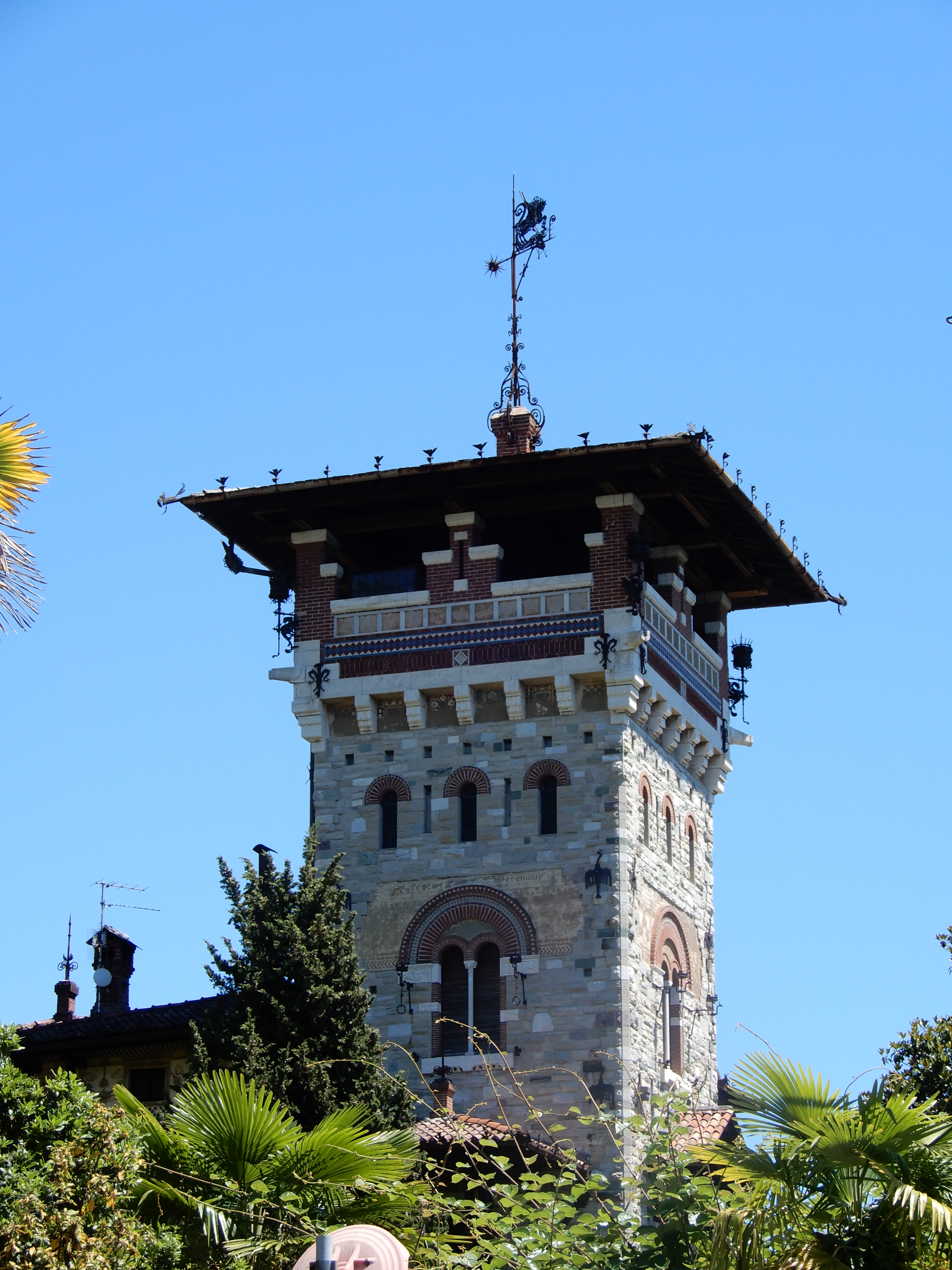

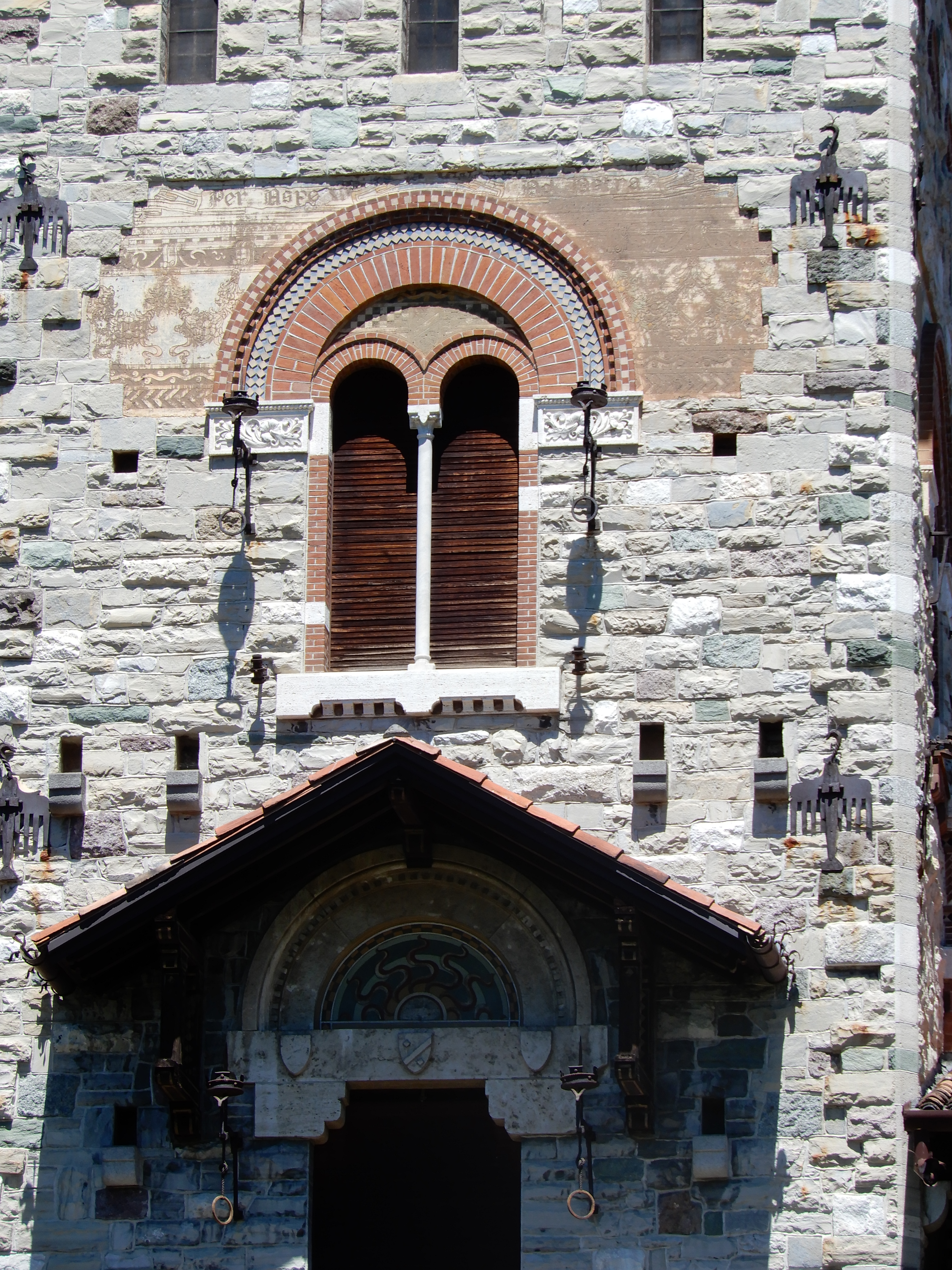

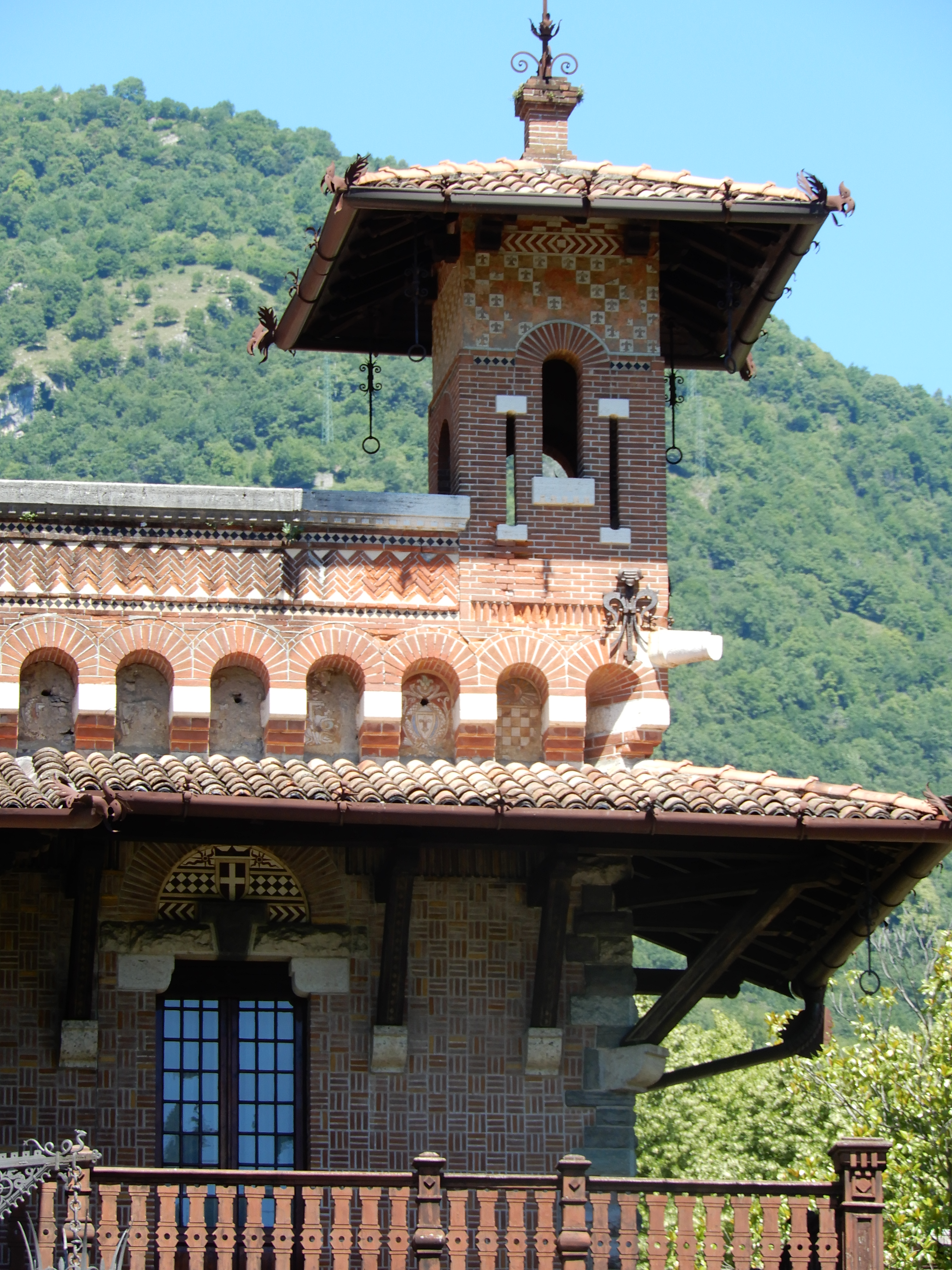
