= How to Lose a Country =

2019 book by Ece Temelkuran

- First edition
- Author: Ece Temelkuran
- Language: English
- Genre: Non-fiction
- Publisher: 4th Estate (HarperCollins)
- Publication date: 2019
- Publication place: United Kingdom

How to Lose a Country: The Seven Steps from Democracy to Dictatorship is a 2019 nonfiction book by Ece Temelkuran, discussing how democracies backslide into dictatorships. It was written in English and published in the United Kingdom by 4th Estate.

Temelkuran outlines the steps on how democracies gradually unravel and discusses this in the context of the rise of Recep Tayyip Erdoğan, who came to power in 2002. Temelkuran's argument is that the same decay of democracy that happened in Turkey can happen in countries in the West.

Hannah Lucinda Smith of The Times wrote that the book is "highly readable and vibrates with outrage," although she criticises the book for mainly focusing on right-wing populism and not adequately describing left wing populism.

Satish Deshpande of The Hindu argued that there are parallels to the rule of Narendra Modi, using the word "saptapadi" to refer to the processes Temelkuran outlined.

How to Lose a Country ... to Dictatorship does not discuss Modi, but references a number of populist processes, among them Brexit, Viktor Orban's infantilist language, Intellectuals for Trump to name but these.
