= Ahmet Ümit =

Turkish author and poet (born 1960)

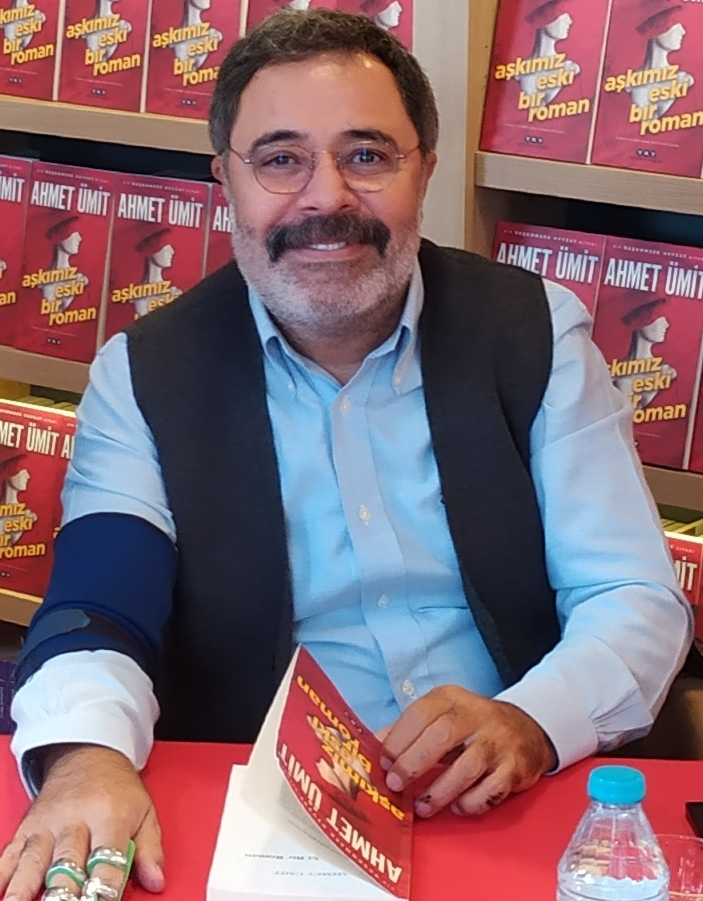
- Ahmet Ümit in 2019
- Born: September 30, 1960 (age 66); Gaziantep, Turkey
- Education: Marmara University
- Occupations: Poet, novelist
- Writing career
- Notable works: A Memento for İstanbul; Sultanı Öldürmek; Beyoğlu'nun En Güzel Abisi

Ahmet Ümit (born September 30, 1960) is a Turkish author and poet. He is best known for his crime novels.

== Early years ==
Ahmet Ümit was born in Gaziantep, in south-central Turkey, in 1960. His father was a kilim merchant and his mother a tailor. He was the youngest of the seven siblings. He finished his primary and middle school in his hometown. Ümit attended the Atatürk High School, however, finished it in Ergani, Diyarbakır. In 1979, he went to Istanbul to study Public Administration at Marmara University. He met his future wife, Vildan, during the university years and married in 1981. They have a daughter, Gül.

Ümit became a member of a leftist organization, which struggled against the military regime in Turkey. He took an active part in the "No to the New Constitution" campaign against the constitutional referendum of 1982 following the 1980 coup d'état. He wrote a report about the police operation in which his comrades were arrested after attaching protest posters on building walls. The report, in reality a short story, was published in Problems of Peace and Socialism, a journal of the Communist Party of the Soviet Union in Prague, then Czechoslovakia. His first story was so published in 40 languages. In 1983, he graduated from the university.

He entered the Communist Party of Turkey (TKP). In 1985, he was sent on scholarship to Moscow, Soviet Union by the party. He studied at the Social Sciences of the Russian Academy. In 1986, he returned home.

== Writing career ==
Ümit started writing poems during his stay in Moscow. His 1998-novel Kar Kokusu ("Odor of Snow") shows traces of his experience in that period. In 1989, he left politics and published his poems in Sokağın Zulası ("Stash of the Street"). During this time he worked in an advertising agency of his friend. In 1990, he co-founded a cultural-art periodical titled Yine Hişt ("Look here again!"). He published his poems, stories and writings in the periodicals Yine Hişt, Adam Sanat, Öküz, Cumhuriyet and the newspaper Yeni Yüzyıl. His 1992-published first story book Çıplak Ayaklıydı Gece ("Barefoot Night") was awarded the "Ferit Oğuz Bayır Thought and Art Prize" the same year. He contributed to the screenplay of the television serial of police drama Çakalların İzinde ("Tracing the Jackals") aired by ATV in 1993. Ümit wrote essays about Franz Kafka (1883–1924), Dostoyevsky (1821–1881), Patricia Highsmith (1921–1995), Edgar Allan Poe (1809–1949) and some other detective fiction authors in various dailies and periodicals in 1995. He also published his first fairy tale book, "Masal Masal İçinde," (A Tale Within a Tale) in 1995. The TV serials Karanlıkta Koşanlar ("Runners in the Darkness") by Uğur Yücal and Şeytan Ayrıntıda Gizlidir ("The devil is in the detail") by Cevdet Mercan based on his short stories. His novel Sis ve Gece ("Fog and Night") was adapted to a movie by Turgut Yasalar in 2007. Ümit produced and presented a programme for Habertürk TV titled Yaşadığın Şehir ("The City, where I Live") in 2010.

He is a member of the advisory board of Okan University.

== Bibliography ==
His works:

- Sokağın Zulası. Istanbul: Everest. 1989. p. 96. ISBN 978-9-752898-36-3.
- Çıplak Ayaklıydı Gece (1992)
- Bir Ses Böler Geceyi (1994)
- Masal Masal İçinde (1995)
- Sis ve Gece (1996)
- Kar Kokusu. Istanbul: Everest. 1998. p. 472. ISBN 978-9-752898-85-1.
- Agatha'nın Anahtarı. Istanbul: Everest. 1999. p. 148. ISBN 978-9-752897-47-2.
- Patasana (2000)
- Şeytan Ayrıntıda Gizlidir. Istanbul: Everest. 2002. p. 310. ISBN 978-9-752897-44-1.
- Kukla. Istanbul: Everest. 2002. p. 512. ISBN 978-9-752897-40-3.
- Beyoğlu Rapsodisi. Istanbul: Everest. 2003. p. 408. ISBN 978-9-752897-38-0.
- Aşk Köpekliktir. Istanbul: Everest. 2004. p. 344. ISBN 978-9-752898-84-4.
- Başkomser Nevzat, Çiçekçinin Ölümü (2005)
- Kavim. Istanbul: Everest. 2006. p. 400. ISBN 978-9-752897-39-7.
- Ninatta'nın Bileziği. Istanbul: Doğan Kitap. 2006. p. 112. ISBN 978-9-759917-88-3.
- İnsan Ruhunun Haritası (2007)
- Olmayan Ülke (2008)
- Bab-ı Esrar. Istanbul: Everest. 2008. p. 520. ISBN 978-6-051411-22-4.
- İstanbul Hatırası (2010)
- Sultanı Öldürmek (2012)
- Beyoğlu'nun En Güzel Abisi (2013)
- Elveda Güzel Vatanım. Istanbul: Everest. 2015. p. 560. ISBN 978-6-051419-48-0.
- Aşkımız Eski Bir Roman. Istanbul: Yapı Kredi Yayınları. 2019. p. 223. ISBN 978-975-08-4555-0.
- Kayıp Tanrılar Ülkesi. Istanbul: Yapı Kredi Yayınları. 2021. p. 504. ISBN 978-975-08-5041-7.
- Bir Aşk Masalı. Istanbul: Yapı Kredi Yayınları. 2022. p. 256. ISBN 978-975-08-5449-1.
- Yırtıcı Kuşlar Zamanı. Istanbul: Yapı Kredi Yayınları. 2024. p. 448. ISBN 978-975-08-6396-7.
- Roma'da Beş Gece. Istanbul, Yapı Kredi Yayınları. 2026

== Graphic novels ==
- Başkomiser Nevzat-Çiçekçinin Ölümü. Istanbul: Doğan Kitap. 2005. p. 58. ISBN 978-9-752933-78-1.
- Başkomiser Nevzat-Tapınak Fahişeleri. Istanbul: Everest. 2007. p. 81. ISBN 978-9-752899-44-5.
- Başkomiser Nevzat-Davulcu Davut'u Kim Öldürdü. Istanbul: Everest. 2016. p. 65. ISBN 978-9-752899-45-2.

== Translated books ==
In English

- Patasana. Translated by Amy Spangler. Istanbul: Everest. 2000. p. 456. ISBN 978-9-752898-00-4.
- The Dervish Gate. Translated by Elke Dixon. Istanbul: Everest. 2012. p. 405. ISBN 978-9-752898-01-1.
- A Tale Within A Tale. Translated by Elke Dixon. Istanbul: Everest. 2013. p. 150. ISBN 978-6-051416-39-7.
- A Memento for Istanbul. Translated by Rakesh Jobanputra. Istanbul: Everest. 2014. p. 590. ISBN 978-9-752899-54-4.

In German

- Nacht und Nebel. Zurich: Unionsverlag. 2005. p. 368. ISBN 978-3-293-20434-8.
- Der Teufel steckt im Detail: Kriminalgeschichten aus Istanbul. Translated by Wolfgang E Scharlipp. Auf dem Ruffel, Engelschoff. 2008. p. 310. ISBN 978-3-933847-21-8.
- Patasana – Mord am Euphrat. Translated by Recai Hallaç. Zurich: Unionsverlag. 2013. p. 416. ISBN 978-3-293-20606-9.

In Polish

- Memento dla Stambułu. Translated by Anna Mizrahi. Warsaw: Dom Wydawniczy. 2015. p. 607. ISBN 978-83-7705-620-2.
