= Villa La Gaeta =

Villa in San Siro, Italy

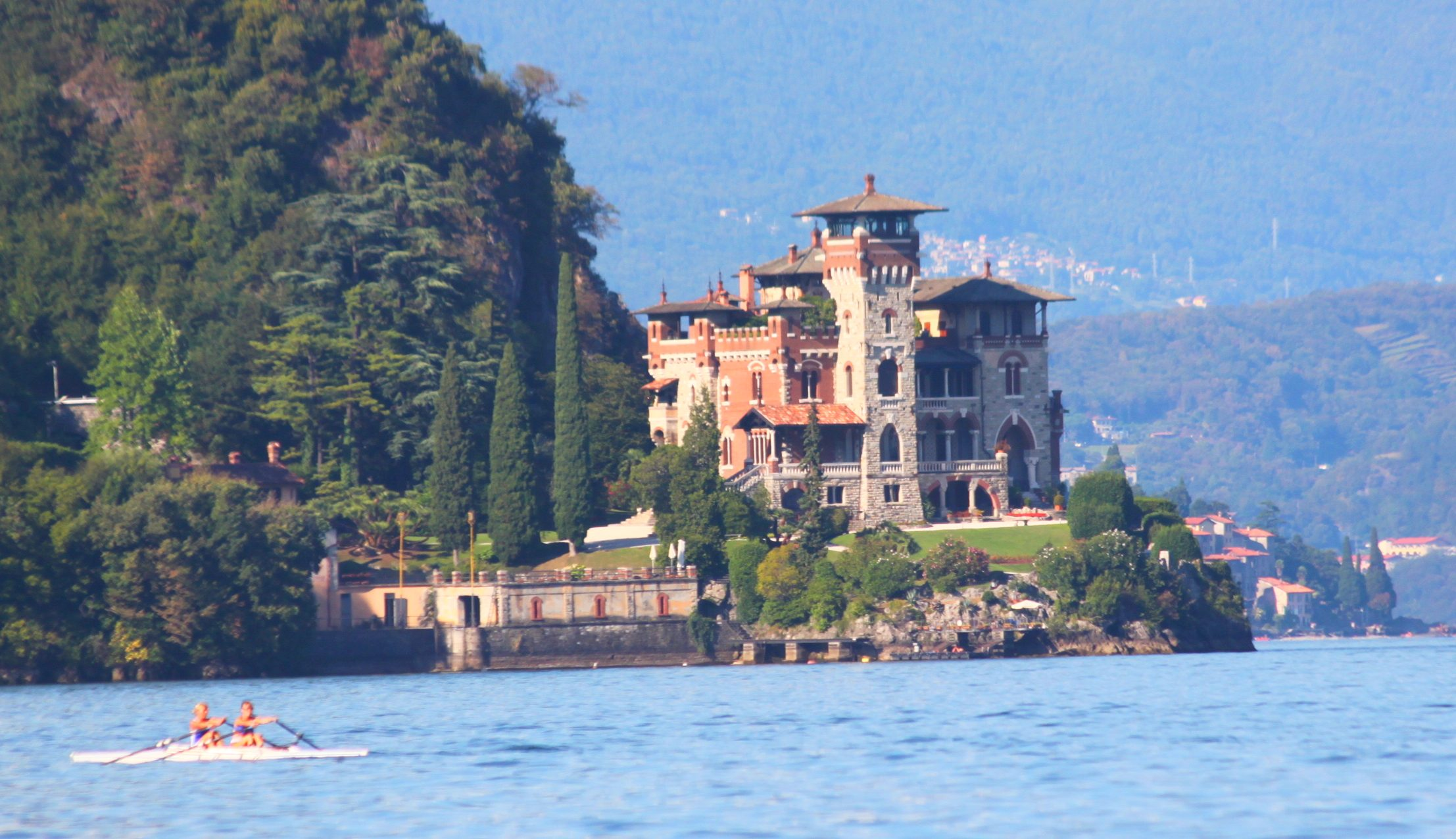
- Villa La Gaeta in San Siro
- Click on the map for a fullscreen view

General information
- Architectural style: Eclectic
- Location: San Siro, Italy
- Coordinates: 46°02′24.9″N 9°15′03″E
- Client: Ambrosoli family

Design and construction
- Architects: Gino Coppedè, Adolfo Coppedè

Villa La Gaeta is an eclectic villa located in San Siro on the shores of Lake Como, Italy. Constructed in the early 20th century, it is celebrated for its blending of Gothic Revival and Art Nouveau architectural elements, as well as its prominence in international popular culture.

== History ==
The villa is situated on a promontory from which it derives its name. The site originally held a modest 19th-century building owned by Solone Ambrosoli (1851–1906), a notable Italian numismatist and co-founder of the Numismatic Society of Italy. Following his death, the Ambrosoli heirs commissioned the Italian architect brothers Gino and Adolfo Coppedè to design a grand residential villa. The design heavily drew inspiration from the architects' concurrent work on the Castello Cova in Milan. Construction was completed in 1921.

In 1940, the property was purchased by the Gerli Counts. In 2011, the villa underwent a conservative restoration and was subsequently subdivided into five exclusive private residential apartments, utilizing both the main structure and the south-facing dépendance which originally formed part of the 19th-century estate. In July 2026, one of these prominent multi-level apartments was placed on the luxury real estate market for approximately €1.45 million, drawing renewed public and media interest to the property.

== Architecture and grounds ==
The building features an eclectic style that seamlessly combines Byzantine, Gothic Revival, and Art Nouveau elements. The exterior is highly detailed, featuring intense color contrasts, exposed brickwork, and asymmetric structural lines. A large, severe medieval-style tower featuring biforas and crowned by a loggia highly characterizes the lakeside façade. The unique architecture of Villa La Gaeta directly influenced the design of Villa Pessina, built nearby in Tremezzo shortly thereafter, which led to historic accusations of plagiarism against the latter's designers.

The villa is surrounded by a private 4,000-square-meter (43,000 sq ft) park featuring manicured lawns, paths, and illuminated fountains. The grounds host a diverse array of flora, including yews, hollies, boxwoods, cypresses, laurels, cedars, and two large plane trees bordering the shoreline. The private estate includes direct resident access to a private beach, a jetty, and a sheltered marina basin.

== In popular culture ==
In 2006, the villa served as a prominent filming location for the climax of the film Casino Royale. It appears as the estate of the villainous character Mr. White, where James Bond (played by Daniel Craig) shoots and confronts him in the final scene of the film, uttering the franchise's iconic catchphrase, "The name's Bond. James Bond."

== Gallery ==
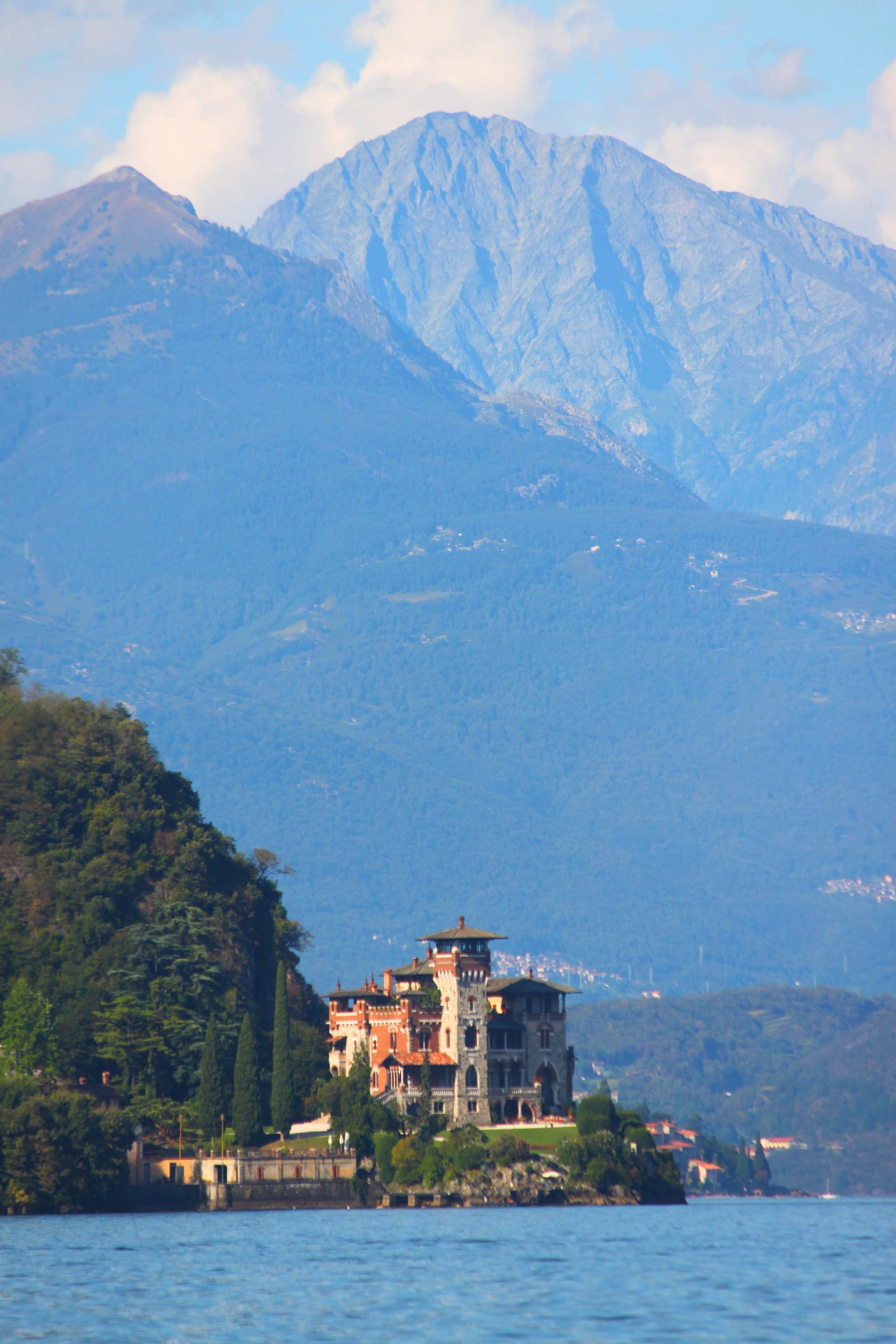

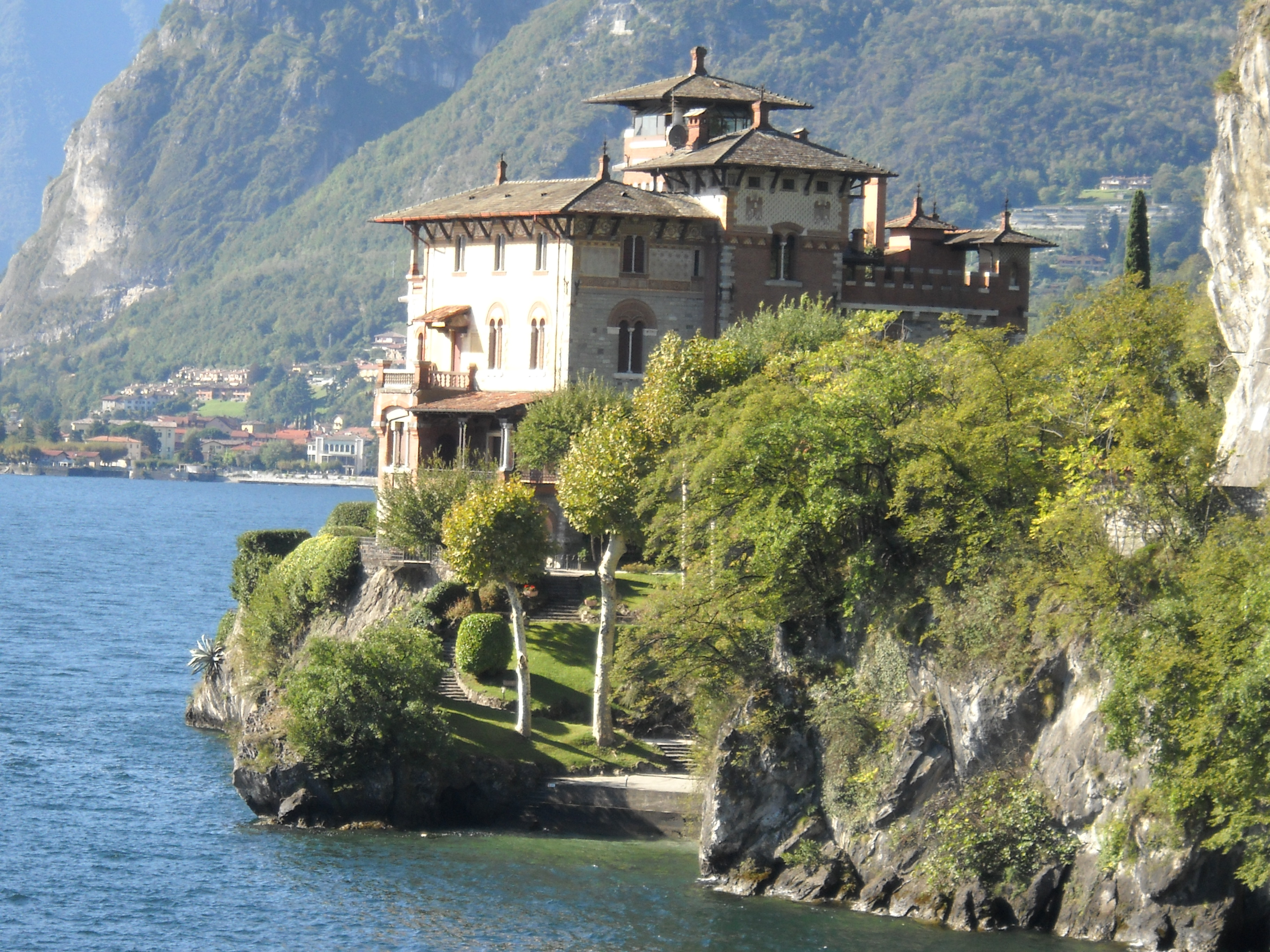
