= Sophie Smiley =

Sophie Smiley (born 1 March 1957) is an author of books for children. She lives in Cambridge and is married with two sons.

== Background ==
Smiley was born in a Dominican monastery near Cambridge. She now teaches English and is also a staff member of Forest School Camps, working with both able students and those with learning difficulties.

She is the daughter of the philosopher and logician Timothy Smiley.

== Writing ==
Smiley is best known for her partnership with Michael Foreman. She has written five stories about a football-mad family.

Her books include Bobby, Charlton and the Mountain, Man of the Match, Team Trouble, Pirates Ahoy, Pup on the Pitch and Snow Goalie.

Bobby, Charlton and the Mountain is the first story in the series and is centred on the female character Charlie, whose family avidly supports and participates in football. Her brother Bobby has been chosen to present a bouquet to The Queen, and he is desperate to earn a football strip to wear for the occasion. The Times Educational Supplement described it as "An excellent story . . . so immediate, so animated".

All her works have been published by Andersen Press.
