= Lyudmila Filipova =

Bulgarian author

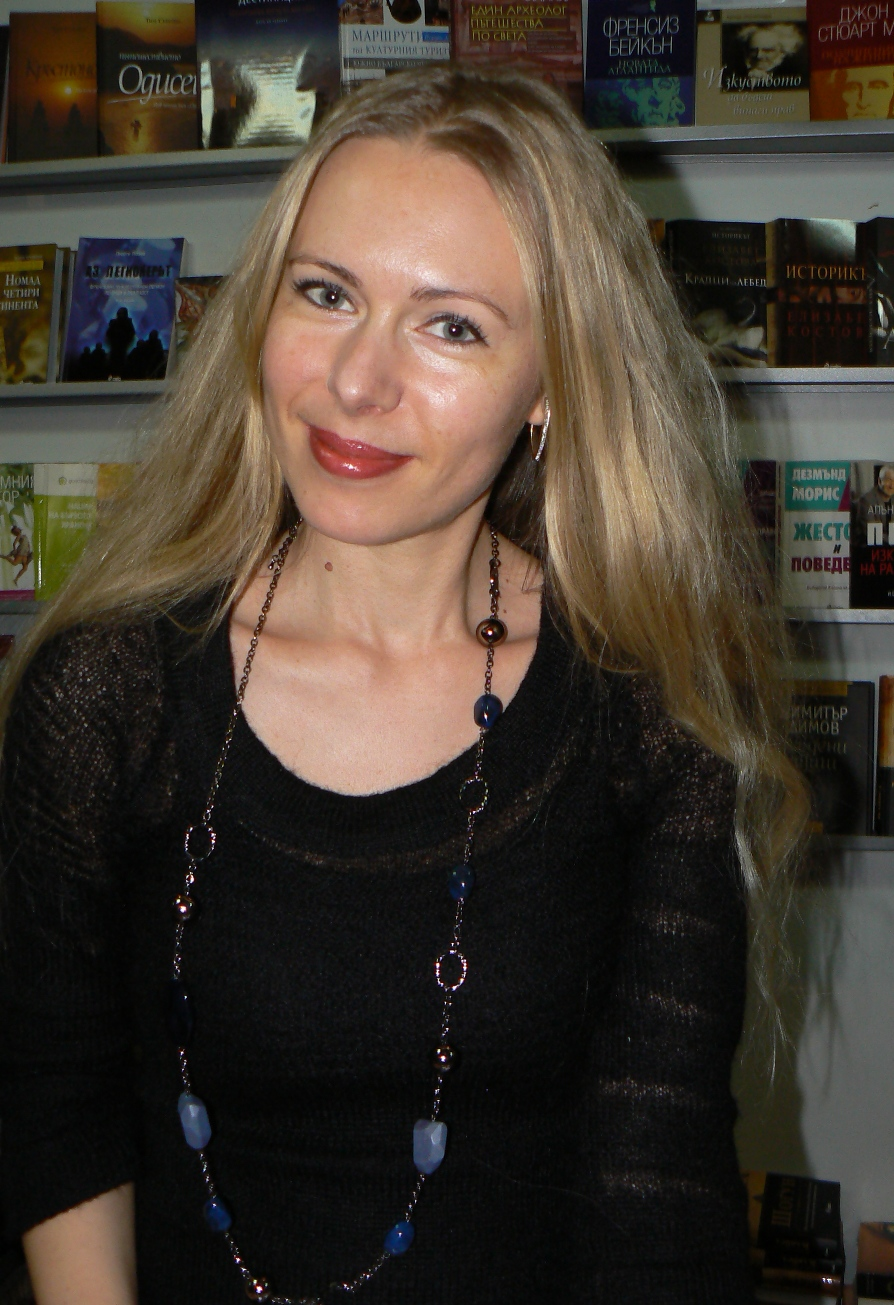
- Born: Sofia, Bulgaria
- Education: Economy
- Alma mater: University of National and World Economy
- Occupations: Novelist and Journalist
- Writing career
- Period: 2000 - present
- Genres: Fantasy, Historical fiction, Thriller
- Notable works: "Anatomy of Illiusions", "The War of the Letters", "Dante's Antichthon", "The Parchment Maze"
- Website: ludmilafilipova.com

Lyudmila Orlinova Filipova (Bulgarian: Людмила Орлинова Филипова) is a Bulgarian novelist and journalist. Since 2006, Filipova has written many best-selling novels. She is known for her critically-acclaimed 2014 historical novel The War of the Letters.

== Early life and education ==
Lyudmila Orlinova Filipova is the granddaughter of the former Bulgarian Prime Minister, Grisha Filipov.

She graduated from the University of National and World Economy in Sofia with honors and received a bachelor's degree in 2000. Later, she graduated from City University and received an MBA degree in General Management. Filipova went on to specialise in creative writing at Oxford University in 2009.

== Career ==
Filipova worked as a marketing director at a German software company, SAP Bulgaria, where she was the managing director of Desiderata Advertising Agency as well as editor-in-chief of the magazine Marketing&Media. She has also been commercial director of MEDIMAG-MS, a medical equipment company.

Filipova is well known to the Bulgarian people as a television reporter for two Bulgarian television channels, 7 DAYS and Triada (a local partner of CNN). She has since published many articles in Bulgarian newspapers, including 24 Hours, Monitor, Novinar, and Economic Life, as well as Tema, BusinessWeek, and Marketing&Media, where she was editor-in-chief.

=== Writing career ===
As of 2014, Filipova had written six bestselling novels. Her first novel was Anatomy of Illusions, published in 2006. This book is one of the most successful stories about the Bulgarian transition period, which began in 1989. It is based on the true story of a boy and a girl during the Bulgarian transition from communism to democracy. It is currently in its sixth edition.

Her second novel, Scarlet Gold (2007). The film rights were sold to a multinational production company. Her third novel, Glass Butterflies (2008), was nominated for the second selection of the European literary contest "Prix du Livre Europeen 2008". In addition, this was the only foreign novel nominated for the American literary award "Hidden River 2009" and was also nominated for the Bulgarian literary award "Novel of the Year" in 2009.

The Parchment Maze, published in 2009, is a suspense thriller which topped national bestseller lists for years and is currently in its sixth reprinting run. In 2012, National Geographic made a film based on the book. This film featured the author, and was entitled Sword in the Stone & the Orpheus Amulet. The novel is based on historical fact and combines an intellectual puzzle with real-life archaeological evidence and some elements of fantasy: it describes a search for the first ancient civilization in Europe.

Dante's Antichthon was published in 2010. This book can be read either as a continuation of The Parchment Maze or as a completely new adventure. It addresses topics previously untouched across Bulgarian literature, including the discoveries at Lepenski Vir, the mirror-image figures of Dante and Orpheus and the secret of the "Tenth Sign" which can only be seen by a chosen few. It also discusses the question of the origin of angels.. In Dante’s Antichthon, the main characters attempt to break the code of the Hidden City built by Gino Coppedè in Rome. They also try to discover why the tombs in Kazanlak, Bulgaria were built for people 2.3-2.5 metres tall (in similar fashion to the Egyptian pyramids and Ancient Babylon).

Published in 2014, The War of the Letters has experienced considerable success. This novel is set during the reign of Simeon I of Bulgaria, during which the Bulgarians created the Cyrillic script. The book highlights the significant role of the Bulgarian alphabet in the preservation and development of the Bulgarian nation, and is considered by many critics a unique story about one of the most significant developments in the history of Bulgaria.

== Adaptations and documentaries ==
In October 2011, a television team from National Geographic filmed a documentary based on the discoveries described in her novel "The Parchment Maze". In November 2011, the movies based on her novels Glass Butterflies and Scarlet Gold won first place in the competition organised by the Bulgarian National Film Center.

== Recognition ==
In December 2011, she was awarded the Woman of the Year award in the Culture and Art category.

== Personal life ==
In 2004, Filipova became a member of the liberal political party Novoto Vreme.
