= Joanna Olech =

Polish writer (born 1955)

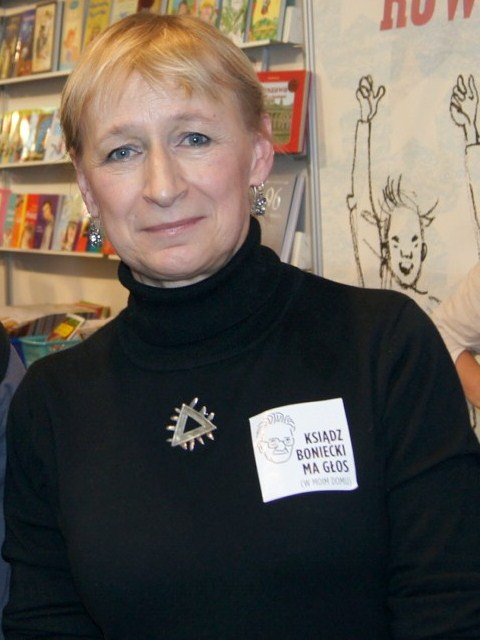
- Joanna Olech (2011)
- Born: Joanna Wunderlich; 26 December 1955 (age 70); Warsaw, Poland
- Occupation: children’s book writer
- Notable work: Dynastia Miziołków

Joanna Olech (born 1955) is a Polish graphic artist and author of books for children and young people. She also writes articles about children's literature. Since 2007, she has been on the board of the Polish Section of the International Board on Books for Young People (IBBY). She is the co-author of Polish Scientific Publishers PWN Polish-language textbooks for junior high-school students.

== Early life ==
Olech was born in Warsaw on 26 December 1955. She is the daughter of Jerzy Wunderlich, a television journalist, and Janina née Cembrzyńska, an editor of popular science books. Her sister is the film set designer Anna Wunderlich. Olech graduated in graphic design from the She is a graduate of the Academy of Fine Arts, Warsaw. In 1980, she married the graphic artist Piotr Młodożeniec and, in 1991, Grzegorz Olech, a mathematician and furniture designer.

== Writing ==
Olech is the author of a recognised series of books about the adventures of Pompon the Dragon Fiś family, stories about what appears to be an ordinary family and its extraordinary charge. She is particularly known for the attention she pays to the design of her books. Many of her books have been published in Spanish as well as in Polish. In addition to her own publications, Olech writes about children’s literature in the magazine, Tygodnik Powszechny, the newspaper, Rzeczpospolita, the journal, Nowe Książki, and in the daily newspaper, Gazeta Wyborcza.

Her own works include:

- Dynastia Miziołków (Miziołków Dynasty), 1994:
- Gdzie diabeł mówi: Do usług! (Where the devil says... at your service!) 1997:
- Trudne słówka: Niepoważny słowniczek dynastii Miziołków (Difficult words: A frivolous dictionary of the Miziołków dynasty), 2002
- Pompon w rodzinie Fisiów (Pompon in the Fiś family), 2007
- Kiedy byłam mała. Kiedy byłem mały (When I was a little girl. When I Was Little - with Michał Rusinek), 2010
- Pulpet i Prudencja: Smocze Pogotowie Przygodowe (Pulpet and Prudence: Dragon Adventure Emergency), 2010
- Bal przebierańców (Fancy Dress Ball), 2011
- Tadek i spółka (Tadek and Company), 2012
- Tarantula, Klops i Herkules (Tarantula, Klops and Hercules), 2012
- Pompon na wakacjach (Pompon on Vacation), 2013
- Tytus - superpies (Tytus – Superdog), 2013:
- ArcyBolek, 2014
- Mam prawo i nie zawaham się go użyć! (I Have the Right and I Will Not Hesitate to Use It!), 2014
- Tytus w cyrku (Tytus at the Circus), 2014
- Ząb czarownicy (Witch's Tooth), 2015
- Bal piłkarzy (Footballers' Ball), 2016
- Poppintrokowie: Opowiadania z magią i dreszczem (Poppintrokowie: Stories with Magic and Chills), 2016
- Porwanie (Kidnapping), 2016
- Szkoła na Dobrej (School on Dobra), 2021
- Miziołki wracają czyli Kaszydło rządzi (Miziołki Return or Kaszydło Rules), 2022
- Tym razem ci się upiekło! (You Got Away with it This Time!), 2022
- Bolek i Lolek szukają skarbu. Bajka o wychodzeniu z tarapatów (Bolek and Lolek Are Looking for Treasure. A Fairy Tale about Getting Out of Trouble), 2023
- Kajtek. Bajki mają moc (Kajtek. Fairy Tales Have Power), 2023
- Guzik. Bajki mają moc (Guzik. Fairy Tales Have Power), 2023

== Other activities ==
Olech serves as an expert for the Polish Film Institute to assess grant applications and, since 2021, has been a member of the jury of the Hestia Literary Journey competition, which honours the best Polish books written for children and young people aged between 10 and 15. The competition is organized by the Hestia Artistic Journey Foundation, together with the Wisława Szymborska Foundation.

== Awards and Distinctions ==
- 1995: Miziołków Dynasty - Kornel Makuszyński Literary Award, for Dynastia Miziołków
- 1996: Miziołków Dynasty - Children's Bestseller of the Year, for Dynastia Miziołków
- 2006: Pink Piglet (author Marcin Brykczyński, illustrations: Joanna Olech and Marta Ignerska) - Book of the Year 2006 (competition of the Polish section of IBBY, distinction for illustrations)
- 2014: In 2014, 50 of the benches in Planty Park in Kraków had a name plate added to them of an author who either came from or was connected with Kraków. A further 50 were added a year later. Next to the name was a QR code, which enabled people to access brief information about the author and read an excerpt from the author's work. This was one of the activities associated with the Kraków UNESCO City of Literature celebrations of that year. Olech was one of those recognised in this way.
