= Çiler İlhan =

Turkish-Dutch writer

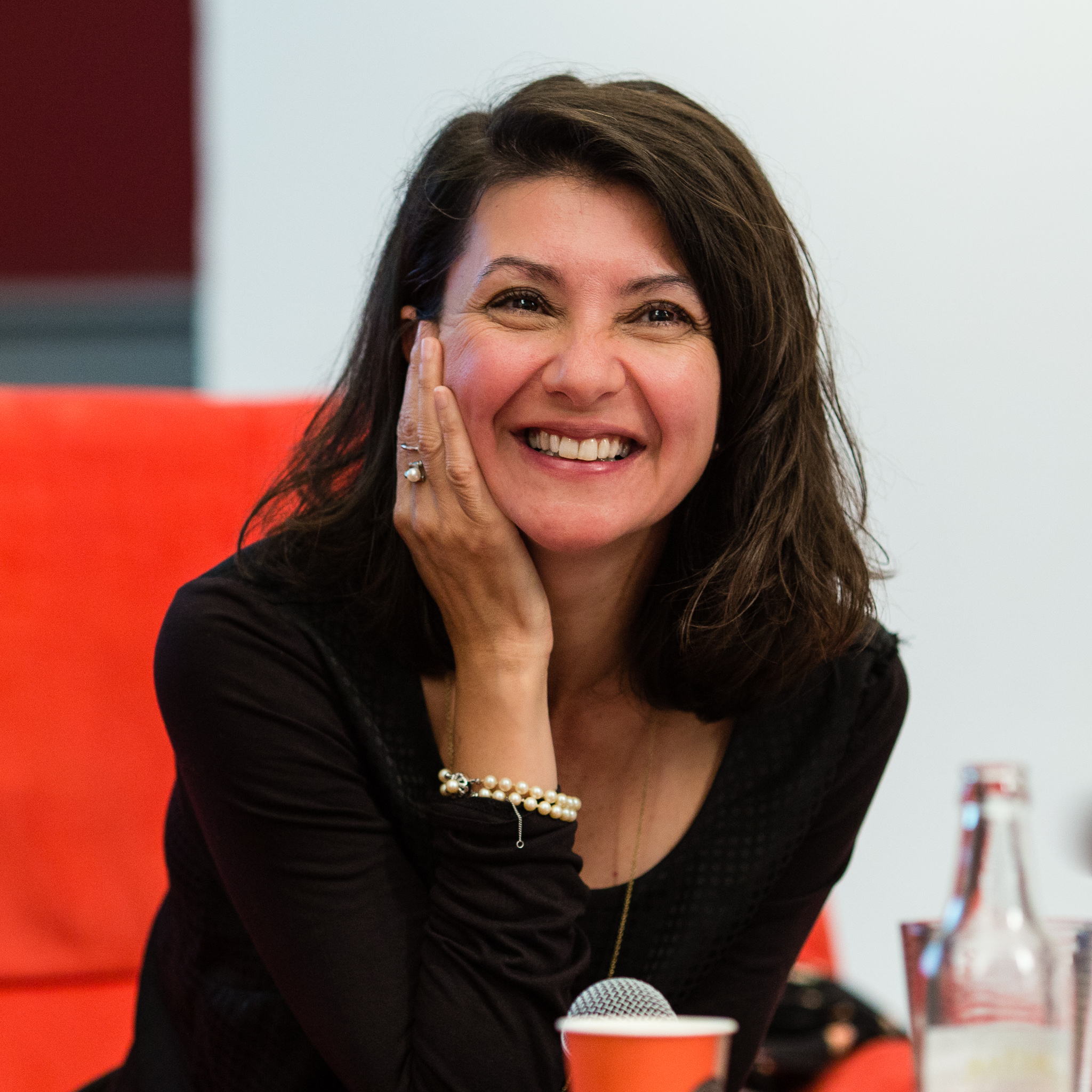
İlhan in 2018

Çiler İlhan (1972) is a Turkish-Dutch writer. İlhan has been an active writer since her youth. In 1993, she won the Yaşar Nabi Nayır Youth Awards award for one of her short stories. She regularly publishes stories, essays, book reviews, travel pieces and translations in newspapers and magazines. Her first book "Rüya Tacirleri Odası" ("Chamber of Dream Merchants", Artemis, April 2006) is a collection of short stories that allude to one another. Her second book entitled "Sürgün" ("Exile", Everest, March 2010) contains interconnected stories whose themes range from the invasion of Iraq to women from Batman, and the fate of laboratory. Sürgün (Exile) won the EU Prize for Literature 2011, and was translated and published into English by Istros Books, London in 2016. Exile, shortlisted also for Prix Du Livre Lorientales 2017, has so far been published in over 20 countries. Nişan Evi (Engagement, Everest, 2021) is a striking novella, told in a unique voice, based on the true story of a mass murder that took place in May 2009, in southeastern Turkey. Its English print (by Istros Books, 2024) was shortlisted for the EBRD Literature Prize. Hayattayız Madem (Everest Publications, 2023; Duygu Asena Novel Prize 2024 finalist) is her last novel spanning 1943 to 2018, Amsterdam to Auschwitz, and Aleppo to Istanbul where a father and his daughters encounter a Syrian refugee in their neighbourhood Teşvikiye in Istanbul. Ilhan's stories and articles were selected for over 20 prominent national and international anthologies. She is a member of Turkish and Dutch PEN.
