= Dynastia Miziołków =

Book by Joanna Olech

Dynastia Miziołków is a children's novel written by Joanna Olech, illustrated originally by Magda Jasny, and published by Egmont Media Group. It is written in Polish in the form of a diary. The main character, Miziołek, is an adolescent.

The book won the 1995 Kornel Makuszyński prize and the 1996 Children's Bestseller of the Year prize.

The book was originally published serially in Świat Młodych magazine in 1993 with Jasny's illustrations. It was republished in color by Egmont as a series of small booklets with illustrations by the author in 1994. It was quickly noticed by readers and critics and the book received the Kornel Makuszyński prize. Next year it was awarded in the competition for Children's Bestseller of the Year. It was later published by the publisher Plac Słoneczny with illustrations by Paweł Pawlak. It has since been reprinted in Polish textbooks, including those by WSiP and OWN. A braille version has also been published.

The latest edition of the book was published in 2009 by Egmont.

The author also wrote a sequel, Trudne słówka (Difficult Words), in 2002, published by Egmont.

== Characters ==
- Miziołek - The protagonist
- Mamiszon - Miziołek's mother
- Papiszon - Miziołek's father
- Kaszydło and Mały Potwór - Miziołek's sisters
