= Mario Levi =

Turkish novelist (1957–2024)

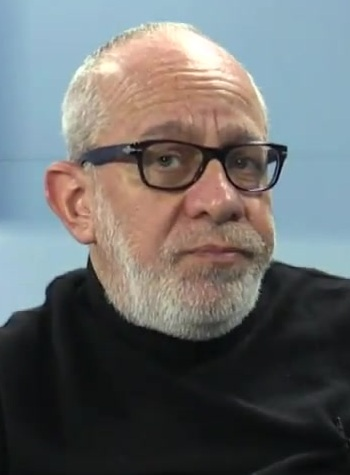
- Levi in 2018
- Born: 25 February 1957; Istanbul, Turkey
- Died: 31 January 2024 (aged 66); Istanbul, Turkey
- Occupations: Writer, journalist, scholar
- Spouse: Ece Levi
- Children: 3

Mario Levi (25 February 1957 – 31 January 2024) was a Turkish novelist, journalist and scholar with a focus on modern Turkish literature.

== Biography ==
Mario Levi was born in Istanbul on 25 February 1957. He graduated from Saint Michel High School in 1975 and from Istanbul University Faculty of Literature French Language and Literature Department in 1980. His first articles were published in the newspaper "Şalom". These were followed by his other articles in the publication organs like "Cumhuriyet", "Studyo Imge", "Milliyet Sanat", "Gosteri", "Argos", "Gergedan", "Varlik".

His first published book was "Jacques Brel: A Lonely Man" (1986). This book is a novelized version of his university graduation thesis. His first book of short stories, "Not Being Able to Go to a City" was published in 1990. These autobiographical stories are an account of the writer with both his loves, his childhood and preteen years. The book won the Haldun Taner Story Prize of the year. His second book of short stories, "Madame Floridis May Not Return" published in 1991, includes people in Istanbul who are having difficulty in adapting to their own minority group and to society. In 1992, his first novel, "Our Best Love Story," was published. Then a long silence took place. His 800-page novel, "Istanbul Was a Fairy Tale", published in 1999, is the story of a Jewish family who lived in Istanbul between the 1920s and 1980s. The heroes of the other minorities in the city are also seen in this novel. The critically acclaimed work solidified his literary reputation, winning the prestigious Yunus Nadi Novel Award (Turkish: Yunus Nadi Roman Ödülü) in 2000. Reflecting both community alienation and cultural mosaic history, the novel was later widely translated and became his first book to be published in English.

Levi, in addition to being a writer, was a French teacher, an importer, a journalist, a radio programmer and a copywriter. He was still giving lectures at Yeditepe University up until his death. He also taught creative writing.

Levi's last novel "Where Were You When Darkness Fell?" was published in January 2009.

Levi's fiction questions myths about Turkish benevolence during the Holocaust, which he compares to the Armenian genocide.

Levi died on 31 January 2024, at the age of 66.

Before his death he was actively working on his first novel written in Judaeo-Spanish language. Titled "Morir es nada" (To Die is Nothing), the book tells the historical story of the Sephardic Jewish expulsion from Spain in 1492 and how these families established themselves in 16th-century Istanbul. He expressed in interviews during late 2023 that translating or writing the book into his ancestral language was deeply personal to him. Levi, who learned the language from his grandmother, had actually finished writing the book in Turkish. He noted that rather than just translating from Turkish language, he was completely re-writing the story because "every language has a different soul"

== Reception ==
Historian Marc David Baer states that Levi "creates characters that are far more believable than the stereotypical tolerant Turks, grateful Jews, and anti-Semitic Armenians and Greeks long propagated by historians."

== Works ==
- Jacques Brel: Bir Yalnız Adam, 1986, biographical fiction (lit. 'Jacques Brel: A Lonely Man').
- Bir Şehre Gidememek, 1990, stories (lit. 'Not Being Able to Go to a City').
- Madam Floridis Dönmeyebilir, 1991, stories (lit. 'Madam Floridis May Not Return').
- En Güzel Aşk Hikâyemiz, 1992, novel (lit. 'Our Best Love Story').
- İstanbul Bir Masaldı, 1999, novel. (English translation: Istanbul Was a Fairy Tale, translated by Ender Gürol, Dalkey Archive Press, 2012).
- Bir Yaz Yağmuruydu, 2005, essays/prose (lit. 'It Was a Summer Rain').
- Lunapark Kapandı, 2005, novel (lit. 'The Amusement Park Closed').
- Karanlık Çökerken Neredeydiniz?, 2009, novel (lit. 'Where Were You When Darkness Fell?').
- İçimdeki İstanbul Fotoğrafları, 2010, autobiographical fiction (lit. 'My Istanbul Photographs').
- Size Pandispanya Yaptım, 2013, novel (lit. 'I Made a Sponge Cake for You').
- Bu Oyunda Gitmek Vardı, 2015, novel (lit. 'Leaving Was Part of This Game').
- Bir Cümlelik Aşklar, 2016, stories (lit. 'One-Sentence Loves').
- Yanlış Tercihler Mahallesi, 2017, novel (lit. 'Neighborhood of Wrong Choices').
- Gördüklerimiz Göremediklerimiz (lit. 'The What We Saw and What We Couldn't See') series:
  - Bir Cuma Rüzgârı: Kadıköy, 2019, novel (lit. 'A Friday Wind: Kadıköy').
  - Bu Salı ve Her Salı: Şişli, 2020, novel (lit. 'This Tuesday and Every Tuesday: Şişli').
  - O Pazartesi: Eminönü, 2020, novel (lit. 'That Monday: Eminönü').
  - Pazarın Yalnızları: Beyoğlu, 2021, novel (lit. 'The Lonely People of the Market: Beyoğlu').
- Teğet Geçen Hayatlar (lit. 'Tangential Lives') series:
  - Ayçiçekleri Her Gece Bir Yalnızlığa Bakar, 2022, novel (lit. 'Sunflowers Look at a Solitude Every Night').
- Çünkü Fısıltılar Vardı, 2023, novel (lit. 'Because There Were Whispers').
- Morir es nada, unpublished novel (Judaeo-Spanish/Ladino title).

== Works in other languages ==
- Istanbul war ein Märchen (İstanbul bir Masaldı)

Suhrkamp Verlag 2008 – Germany – [www.suhrkamp.de]

- Wo wart ihr, als die Finsternis hereinbrach? (Karanlık Çökerken Neredeydiniz?)

Suhrkamp Verlag 2011 – Germany – [www.suhrkamp.de]

- Istanbul era una favola (İstanbul bir Masaldı)

Baldini Castoldi Dalai editore 2007 – Italy [www.bcdeditore.it]

- La nostra più bella storia d'amore (En Güzel Aşk Hikayemiz)

Baldini Castoldi Dalai editore 2008 – Italy [www.bcdeditore.it]

- Estambul era un cuento (En Güzel Aşk Hikayemiz)

Galaxia Gutenberg 2013 - Spain [www.galaxiagutenberg.com]
