= Tuna Kiremitçi =

Turkish singer-songwriter and crime author

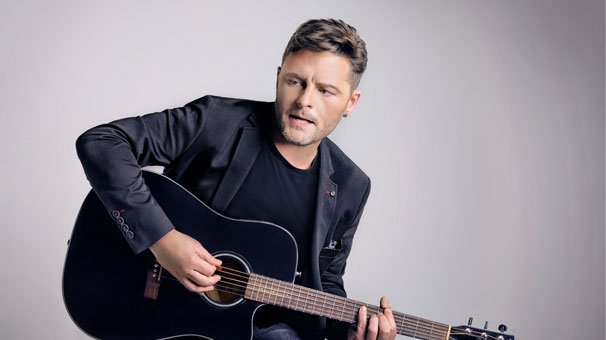

Background information
- Born: 24 February 1973 (age 53); Eskişehir, Turkey
- Genres: Alternative music
- Occupations: Singer; songwriter; composer; poet
- Years active: 1994–present
- Website: Official website

Tuna Kiremitçi (born 24 February 1973) is a contemporary Turkish singer-songwriter and crime author.

He is generally inspired by tragedies of common people, the dilemmas of women-men relationship in the society, and the melancholy of aging, all of which he used to create both sad and happy concepts in his works, and is influenced by the "romantic irony" brought by Professor Gürsel Aytaç to the Turkish literature.

In the 1990s, he worked both as a soloist and composer in the rock group Kumdan Kaleler, and together they released the album Denize Doğru in 1996. After releasing his first solo album, Kendi Halinde, in 2007, he collaborated with the Atlas rock group on the album Selam Yabancı (2013) as a soloist and songwriter. Together with Atlas, they released the EP Bir Uyumsuz Bulut in 2015.

In 2010, in an operation by the police to identify a prostitution mafia marketing of foreign women, he was invited to give a statement to the Istanbul Public Security Branch Directorate on the grounds that he had come across the mafia's customers. Despite these newspaper reports, there is no such statement in the Istanbul police records.

In 2013, he adapted Bu İşte Bir Yalnızlık Var and turned it into a movie, with Engin Altan Düzyatan and Özgü Namal portraying the leading roles. The next year, he brought Dualar Kalıcıdır on stage, and Nurseli İdiz starred as the play's main actor.

His books have been translated into 16 different languages. Kiremitçi has a son and a daughter. For a while, he worked as a journalist for Cumhuriyet. On 11 June 2010, he started writing in the Hürriyet newspaper's Kelebek appendix, but ended his work with them in 2012. Between 2013 and 2014, he wrote articles for the Aydınlık newspaper. Since 2020, he has been writing crime novel reviews in weekly newspaper Gazete Oksijen.

Kiremitçi stated that he put an end to his career as a writer in 2016 and will continue with music and poetry alone. In the same year, he started working on the album Tuna Kiremitçi ve Arkadaşları. Both his old and new compositions were used in the album and singers such as Pamela, Özge Fışkın, Gonca Vuslateri, Öykü Gürman, Gülçin Ergül, Jehan Barbur, Yıldız Tilbe, Sena Şener, Gökçe Bahadır, and Gülay voiced the songs as featured artists. After releasing the songs on YouTube, in 2017 they were released as an album by Pasaj Müzik. Alternative music critics Naim Dilmener (Hürriyet, 13 Jan 2017) described it as "A good album coming early with a new year", with journalist Asu Maro (Milliyet, 27 Jan 2017) believed that it was "The most sincere work of recent times." Music critics Yavuz Hakan Tok (Milliyet Sanat, 13 Feb 2017) also commented on the album and wrote: "Tuna Kiremitçi is a good songwriter. He finds and writes beautiful and influential melodies and lyrics, and has been doing it since the time he was younger."

The "Tuna Kiremitci and Friends" album was awarded in 2019 with one of Turkey's most important music awards the "Golden Butterfly Award".

In 2021, he returned to writing novels after a long time, and his first detective novel Mezun Cinayetleri (Graduate Murders) was published from Doğan Kitap. Critic Sibel Oral comments on the novel as follows: "Kiremitçi had tried something difficult. He did not fall into the cliché traps of crime narration, he wrote a novel that was self-confident, knew his story, and most importantly, told his story very well."

He is a graduate student at MSGSÜ Cinema-TV Department.

== Albums ==
- Kendi Halinde (2007)
- Tuna Kiremitçi ve Arkadaşları (2017)
- Tuna Kiremitçi ve Arkadaşları 2 (2019)
- On Numara Olaylar (2021)

== Bibliography ==
- Ayabakanlar/İlk Yapıtları (1994)
- Bazı Şiirler Bazı Şarkılar (2003)
- Yolda Üç Kişi (2008)
- Küçüğe Bir Dondurma (2009)
- A. Ş. K. Neyin Kısaltması? (2010)
- Hepimiz Birilerinin Eski Sevgilisiyiz (2011)
- Bu İşte Bir Yalnızlık Var (2003)
- Git Kendini Çok Sevdirmeden (2002)
- Sonun Geldi Sevgilim (2014)
- Güneş'i Kıskandıran Kız (2015)
- Uçan Halıların Ayrodinamik Sorunları (2015)
- Kendi Seven Ağlamaz (2016)
- Bir Uyumsuz Bulut (2017)
- Dualar Kalıcıdır (2007)
- Bir Gönül Meselesi (2012)
- Selanik'te Sonbahar (2011)
- Mezun Cinayetleri (2021)
- Perinin Ölümü (2022)
