= Aslı Perker =

Turkish journalist and writer

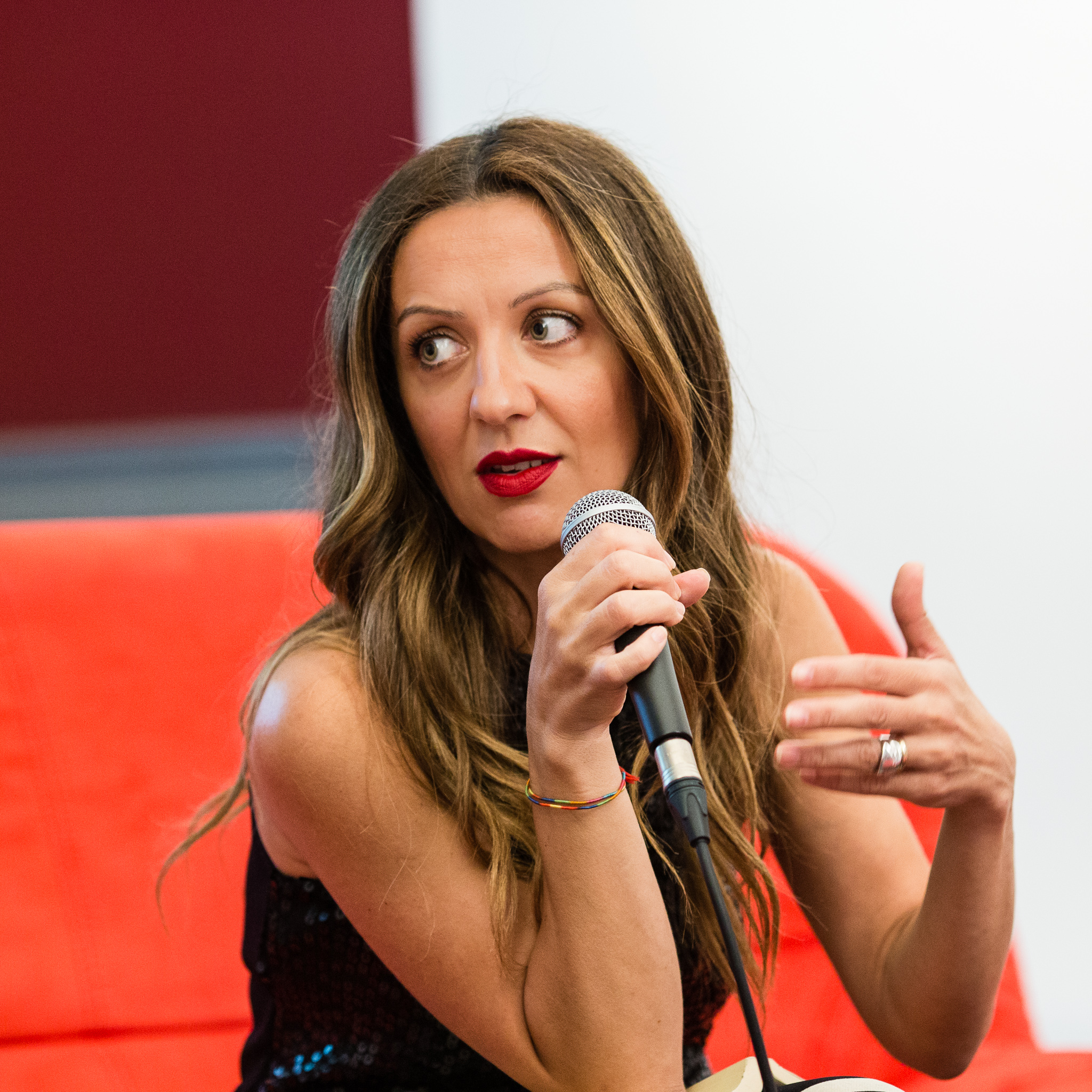
- Born: 1975 (age 50–51); İzmir, Turkey
- Education: Dokuz Eylül University
- Occupations: Journalist, writer

Aslı E. Perker (born 1975) is a Turkish journalist and writer.

== Life and career ==
Aslı Perker was born in İzmir, Turkey in 1975. Because of her father's military service, she completed her primary, secondary, and high school education in various cities across Anatolia. She graduated from the Department of American Culture and Literature at the Faculty of Arts and Sciences of Dokuz Eylül University with a degree in American Literature and Culture. After her university education, she worked in weekly magazine Aktüel Haber Dergisi (Aktüel News Magazine); Turkish daily newspapers Radikal, Yeni Binyıl, Sabah; and as a freelance reporter and journalist in New York City. After moving to New York City in 2001, Perker devoted more of her time to literary writing. Her debut novel, Başqalarının qoxusu (The Smell of Others), was published in 2005. Her second book, Cəllad məzarlığı (The Executioner's Graveyard), was published in 2009. It was followed in 2011 by Sufle (Soufflé). The latter two books have been translated into eight and twenty-three languages, respectively.

Perker contributed a story titled “Ziu-nun qar kürəsi” (“Ziu's Snow Globe”) to the collaborative short-story collection Qar izlərini örtdü (The Snow Covered the Tracks). The story was also included in the crime anthology Bir gün yenə oyanacaqsınız… (One Day You Will Wake Up Again...), published in Germany by Random House.

She also contributed a short story titled “Terapiya” (“Therapy”) to Alisa, möcüzələr diyarından aradan çıxan tapılır – Terapiya (Alice, Found Missing from Wonderland – Therapy), a collection featuring stories by fourteen women writers.

After returning to Istanbul in 2010, she worked as a columnist in Turkish daily newspapers including Milliyet, as a blogger and columnist on several online publications, and is currently the chief editor of Turkish publishing house Beyaz Baykus Yayinlari.

Perker's novel Mənə kömək et (Help Me) was published in September 2015. Her subsequent works include Xəzan vaxtı (Autumn Time), published in 2016, Flaminqolar çəhrayıdır (Flamingos Are Pink), published in 2018, and Ayrılığın ilk günü (The First Day of Separation).

Several of her works have been translated into Azerbaijani and published by Qanun Publishing House, including Cəllad məzarlığı, Mənə kömək et, Sufle, Flaminqolar çəhrayıdır, and Xəzan vaxtı.

== Novels ==
Perker's novels include:

- Baskalarinin Kokusu (2005)
- Cellat Mezarligi (2009)
- Sufle (2011)
- Bana Yardim Et (2015)
- Vakit Hazan (2016)
- Flamingolar Pembedir (2018)

Sufle ('Soufflé') has been translated into several languages and published in many countries.
