= Ece Temelkuran =

Turkish journalist and author (born 1973)

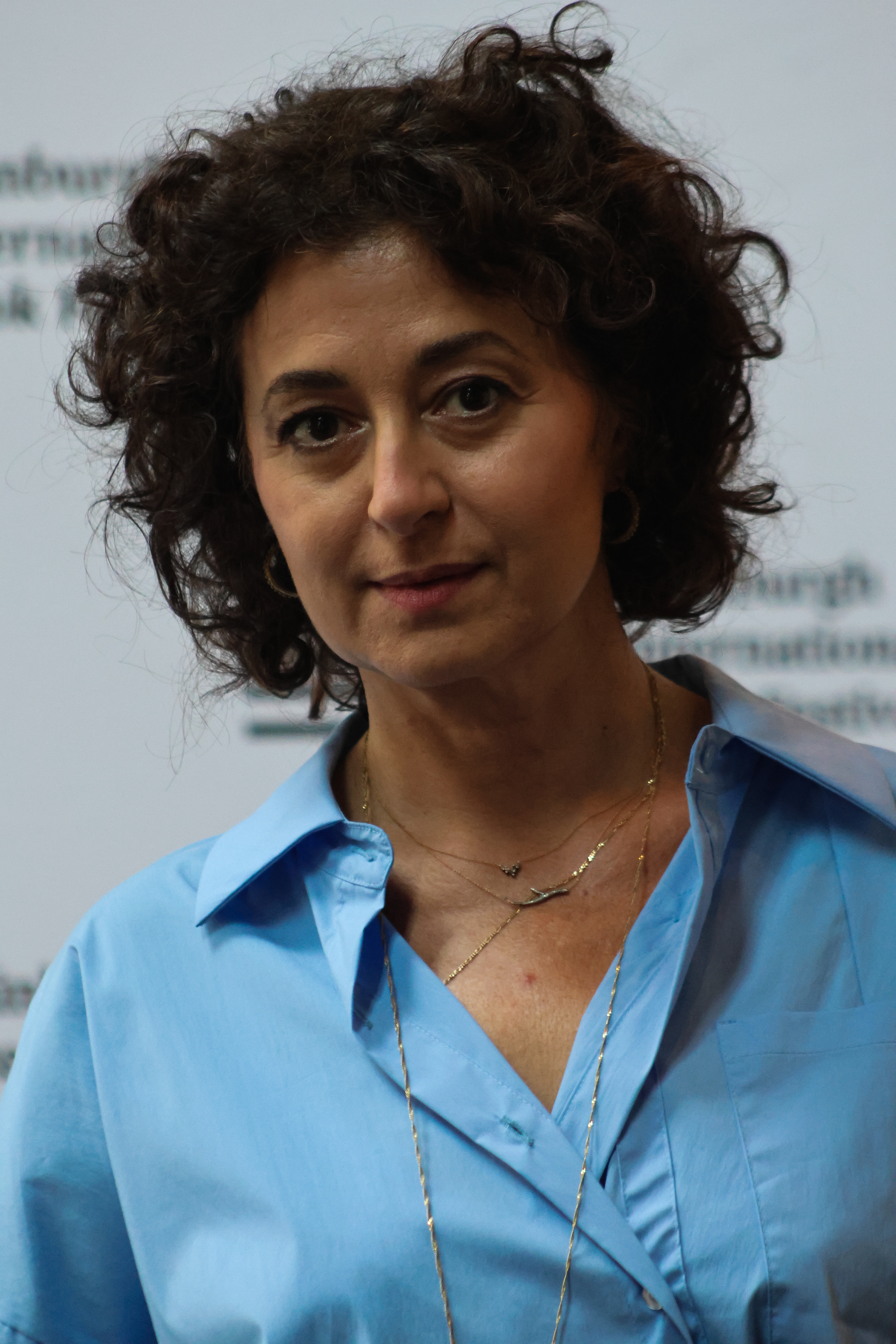
- Temelkuran at Edinburgh Book Festival 26
- Born: 22 July 1973 (age 53); İzmir, Turkey
- Education: Ankara University
- Occupations: Writer, Political commentator, Journalist
- Notable work: How to Lose a Country
- Website: ecetemelkuran.net

Ece Temelkuran (/ˈɛdʒeɪ təˈmɛlkərɑːn/; born 22 July 1973) is a Turkish journalist and author.

== Biography ==
Ece Temelkuran was born on 22 July 1973 in İzmir. She was a columnist for Milliyet (2000–2009) and Habertürk (2009 – January 2012), and a presenter on Habertürk TV (2010–2011). She was fired from Habertürk after writing articles critical of the government, especially its handling of the December 2011 Uludere massacre. She was twice named Turkey's "most read political columnist". Her columns have also been published in international media such as The Guardian, The New York Times, La Stampa, Der Spiegel, Internazionale and Le Monde Diplomatique.

A graduate of Ankara University's Faculty of Law, she lived in Beirut, Tunis, and Paris, to write her novels.

In 2008 she was a visiting fellow at the Reuters Institute for the Study of Journalism, during which time she wrote Deep Mountain, Across the Turkish-Armenian Divide.

For her book Turkey: The Insane and the Melancholy, she won the Edinburgh International Book Festival First Book award for her novel Women Who Blow On Knots and the Ambassador Of New Europe Award.

She was awarded the Human Rights Association of Turkey's Ayşe Zarakolu Freedom of Thought Award in 2008.

From March 2021 to September 2023 she was a fellow at The New Institute, Hamburg, working on a project "A New Vocabulary for 21st Century Progressives. She is on the advisory board of Progressive International and Democracy Next.

In 2019, she published the internationally acclaimed nonfiction book How to Lose a Country: The 7 Steps from Democracy to Dictatorship, about the rise of right-wing populism and how it operates.

2021 saw the publication of her non-fiction book “Together: 10 Choices for a Better Now” extolling the virtues of humanity and the need to be “together”.

In 2023, she received the El Mundo International Journalism Awards in the Freedom of the Press category for her body of work.

Temelkuran was shortlisted for the 2026 Women's Prize for Non-Fiction for Nation of Strangers.

== Works ==
- Book of the Edge : Poems translator Deniz Perin, Rochester, N.Y. : BOA Editions, 2010. ISBN 9781934414361
- Deep Mountain Across the Turkish-Armenian Divide, Verso Books, London, 2010. ISBN 978-1844674237
- Turkey: the Insane and the Melancholy, translator Zeynep Beler, London : Zed Books, 2015. ISBN 9781783608904
- Women Who Blow on Knots translator Alexander Dawe, Cardigan : Parthian Books, 2017. ISBN 9781910901694
- Time of Mute Swans. Skyhorse Publishing Company, Incorporated, 2017. ISBN 9781628728149
- How to Lose a Country: the 7 steps from democracy to dictatorship. Fourth Estate Ltd., 2019. ISBN 9780008340612
- Together:10 Choices for a Better Now. Fourth Estate Ltd., 2021. ISBN 9780008393809
- Nation of Strangers: Rebuilding Home in the 21st Century. Cannongate Books, 2026. ISBN 9781837262021
