= Ayfer Tunç =

Turkish writer (born 1964)

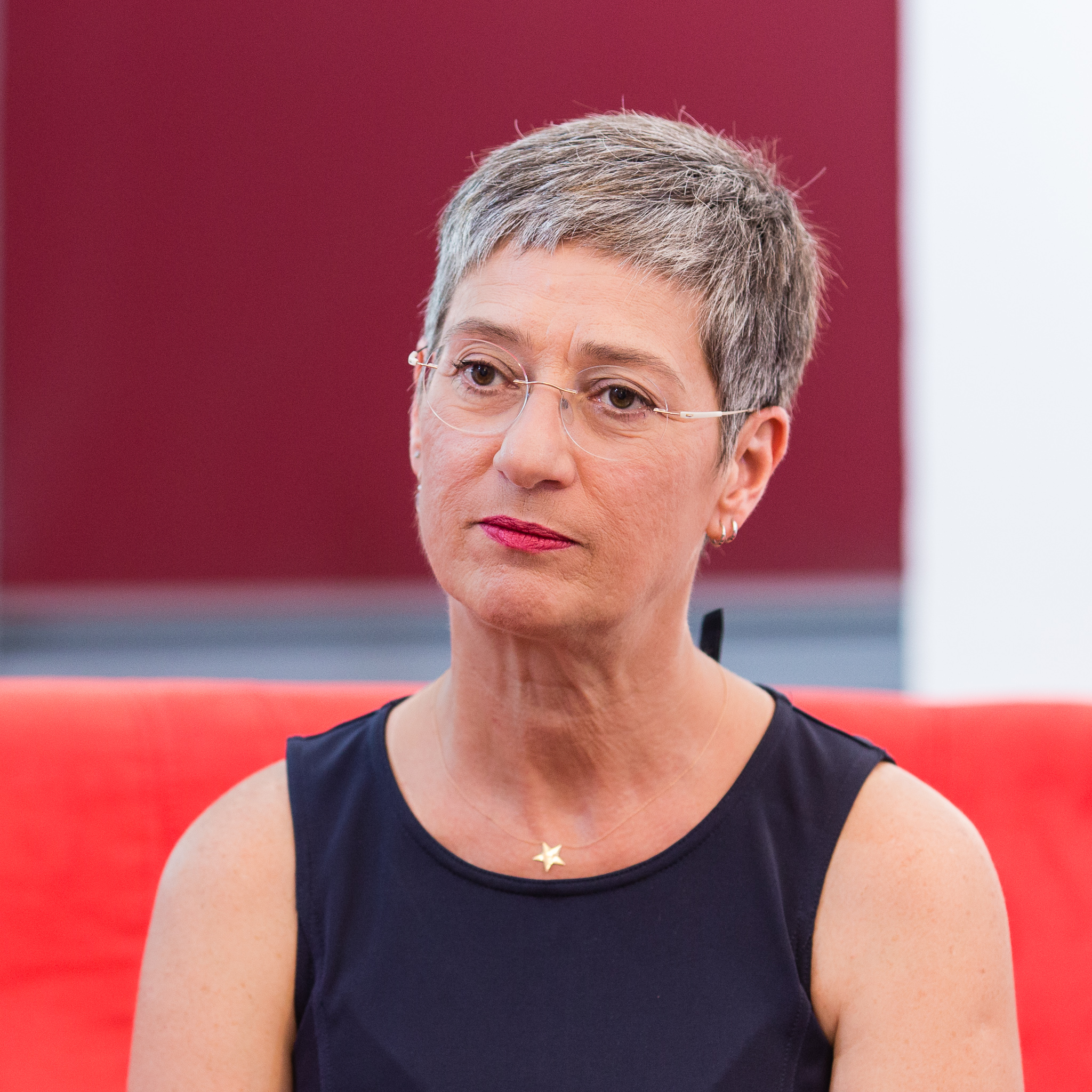
Ayfer Tunç, 2018

Ayfer Tunç (born 1964 in Adapazarı) is a contemporary Turkish writer.

She graduated from the Istanbul University Faculty of Political Sciences. During her university years, she wrote many articles for various literature, culture and art magazines. In 1989, she participated in the Yunus Nadi Short Story Competition organized by the daily Cumhuriyet newspaper. Her short story titled Saklı (Hidden) received the first prize. Between 1999-2004, she worked as the chief editor of Yapı Kredi Publishing House. Her book titled Maniniz Yoksa Annemler Size Gelecek-70’li Yıllarda Hayatımız (My Parents Will Visit You If You Aren’t Occupied - Our Life in the '70s) was published in 2001 and was met with great enthusiasm. In 2003, the same book won the International Balkanika Award, co-organized by seven Balkan countries, and qualified for being translated into six Balkan languages. In addition, the book was published in Arabic in Syria and Lebanon. Ayfer Tunç also wrote a script titled Havada Bulut (Cloud in the Sky), based on short stories by Sait Faik Abasıyanık, and it was filmed and broadcast on TRT in 2003.

== Works ==
=== Novels ===
- Cover Girl 1992
- Bir Deliler Evinin Yalan Yanlış Anlatılan Kısa Tarihi 2009, translated into English as "The Highly Unreliable Account of the History of a Madhouse" by Istros Books, London 2020.

=== Shorts stories ===
- Hidden (story) 1989
- Friends From The Cave (story) 1996
- The Aziz Bey Phenomenon (story) 2000, translated into English as "The Aziz Bey Incident" by Istros Books, London 2013.
- Rock- Paper- Scissors (story) 2003
- Evvelhotel (story) 2006

=== Other ===
- Two-Faced Sexuality (research) 1994
- My Parents Will Visit You If You Aren’t Occupied (life) 2001
- “This They Call Life” (life) 2007

== See also ==
- Turkish literature
