= Mackenzie Castle =

- Castello Mackenzie (Italian)
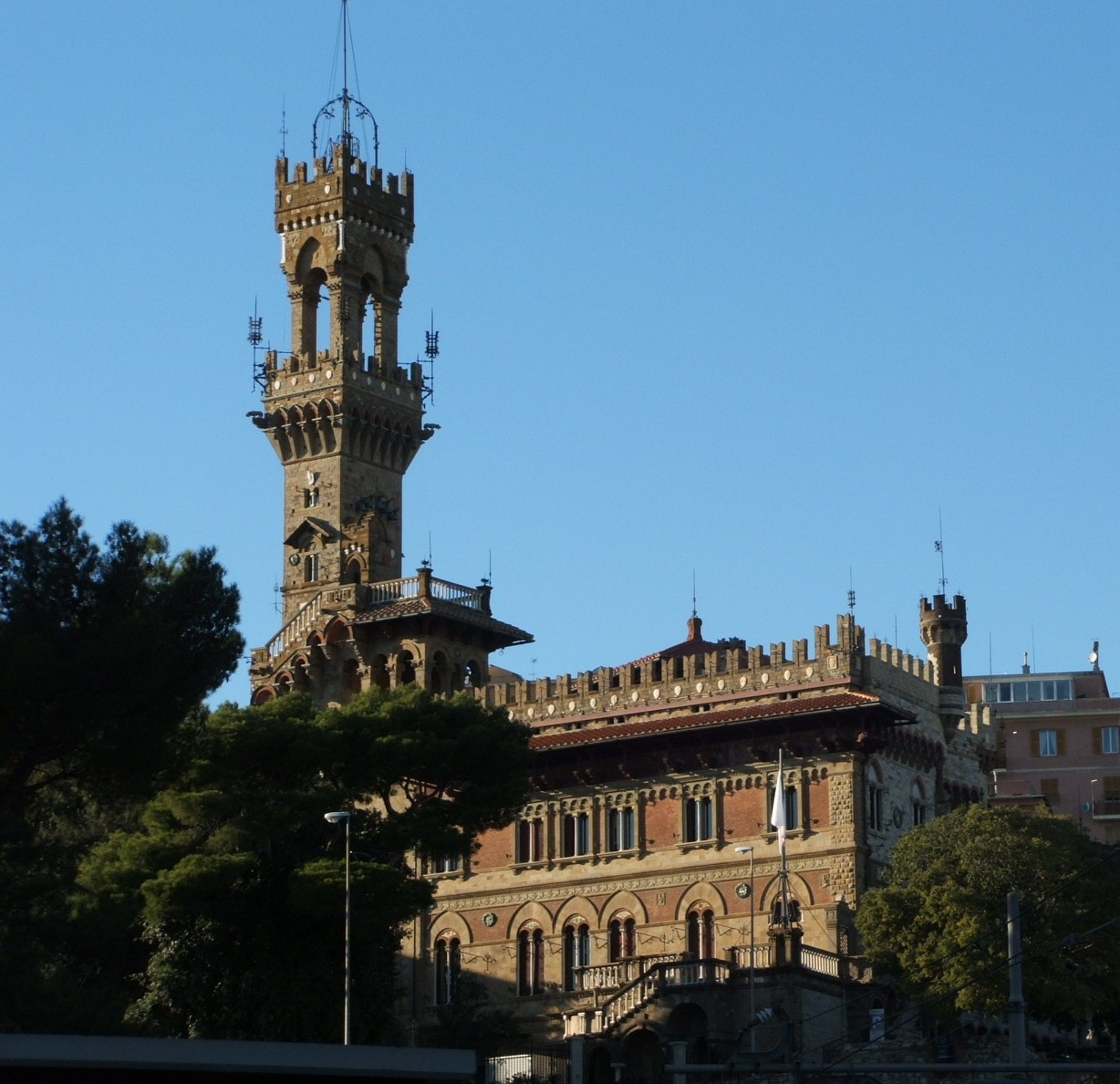
- Mackenzie Castle in Genoa
- Click on the map for a fullscreen view

General information
- Location: Genoa, Italy
- Coordinates: 44°24′55″N 8°56′50″E

Design and construction
- Architect: Gino Coppedè

The Mackenzie Castle (Italian: Castello Mackenzie) is a historical manor in the Castelletto quarter of Genoa, northern Italy. It is an example of Gothic Revival architecture.

Registered as a cultural space on the occasion of Genoa European Capital of Culture 2004, in autumn 2006 it was one of the venues of the Festival della Scienza.

== History ==
The castle was built on a pre-existing country villa, in turn located on the site of the 16th century Genoese walls.

Built in 1893-1905, it was designed in Gothic Revival style by Art Nouveau architect Gino Coppedè under commission by Evan Mackenzie, an insurance broker, whose family lived here for 26 years.

In 1956 it was declared a national monument. Thirty years later it was acquired by American collector Mitchell Wolfson, Jr. The restoration works he commissioned remained unfinished, and in 2002 the castle was sold to the Cambi auction house which commissioned the restoration to architect Gianfranco Franchini. The manor was opened to the public in 2004 and is now used as a public space for scientific or cultural exhibitions.

== See also ==
- D'Albertis Castle
