= Fog and Night =

- Directed by: Turgut Yasalar
- Starring: Uğur Polat; Selma Ergeç
- Release date: 23 February 2007
- Running time: 1h 30min
- Country: Turkey
- Language: Turkish

Fog and Night (Turkish: Sis ve Gece) is a 2007 Turkish adventure film directed by Turgut Yasalar.

== Cast ==
- Uğur Polat - Sedat
- Selma Ergeç - Mine
- Ayten Uncuoğlu - Madam Eleni
- Kemal Bekir - Ismet
- Tülay Günal - Melike
- Sinan Albayrak - Mustafa
