= Gino Coppedè =

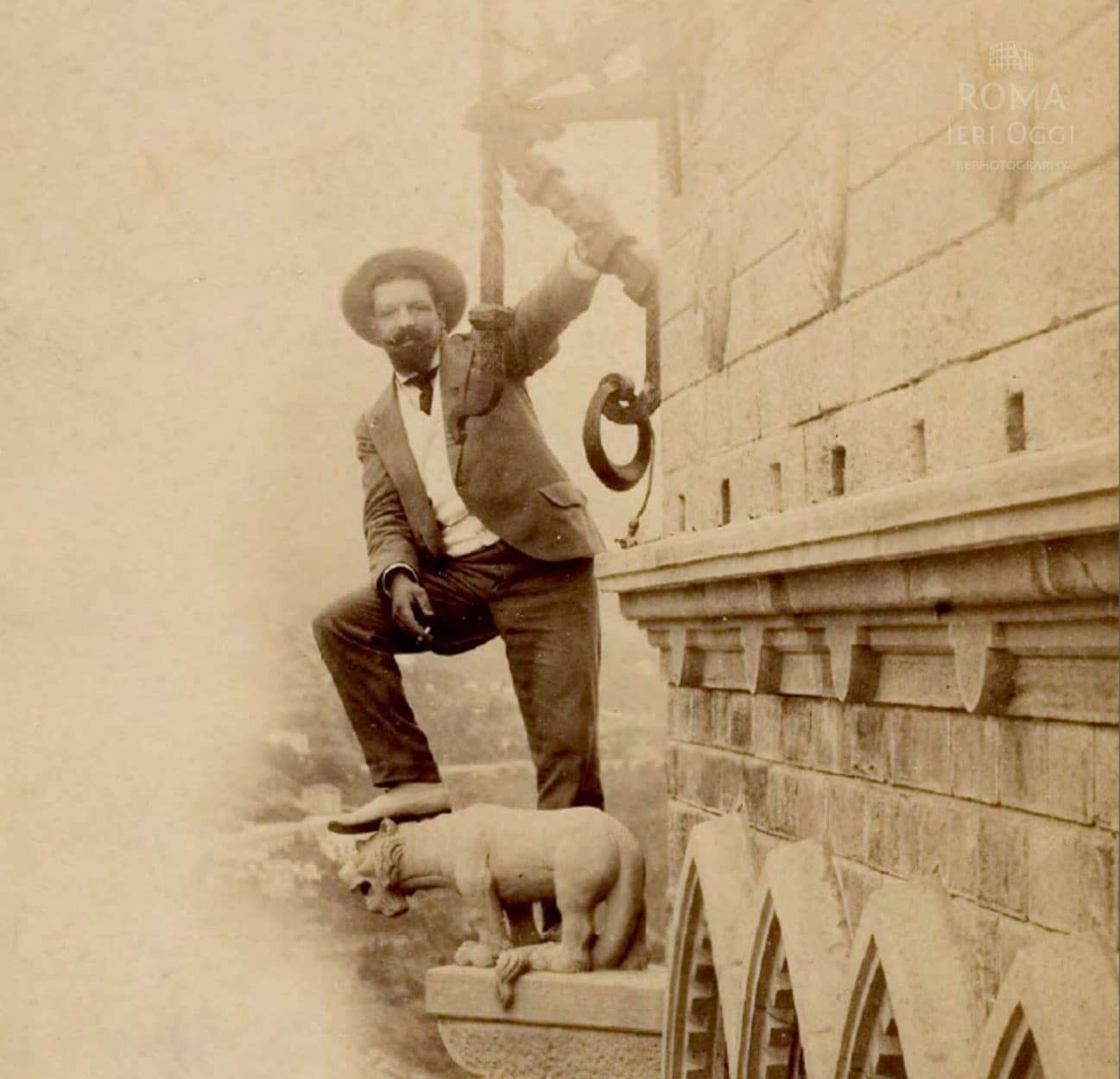
- Born: 26 September 1866; Florence, Italy
- Died: 20 September 1927 (aged 60); Rome, Italy
- Occupation: Architect
- Buildings: Mackenzie Castle; Quartiere Coppedè; Villa La Gaeta; Palazzo Galli; Villa Barsanti

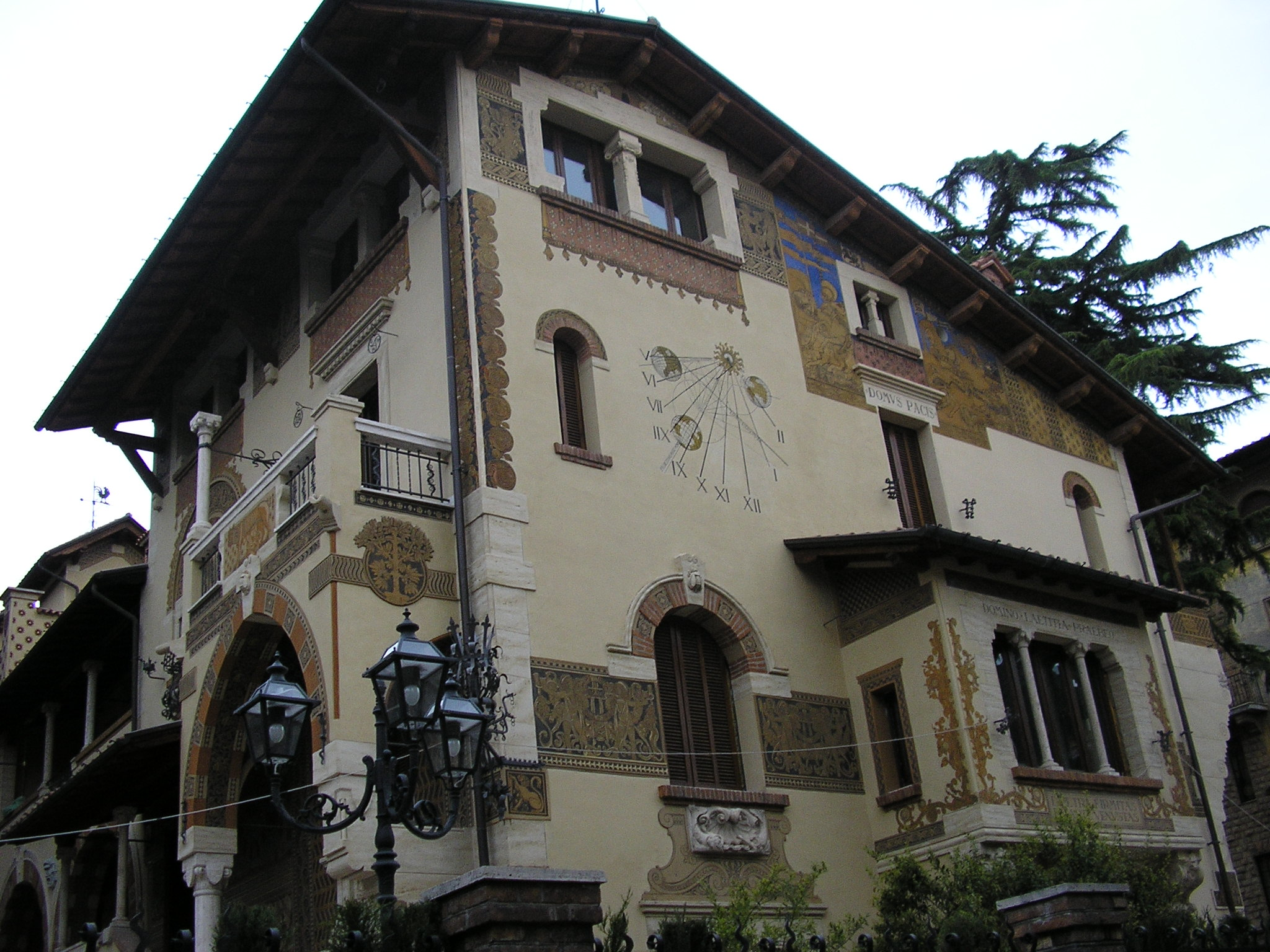
A house in the so-called "Quartiere Coppedè" in Rome.

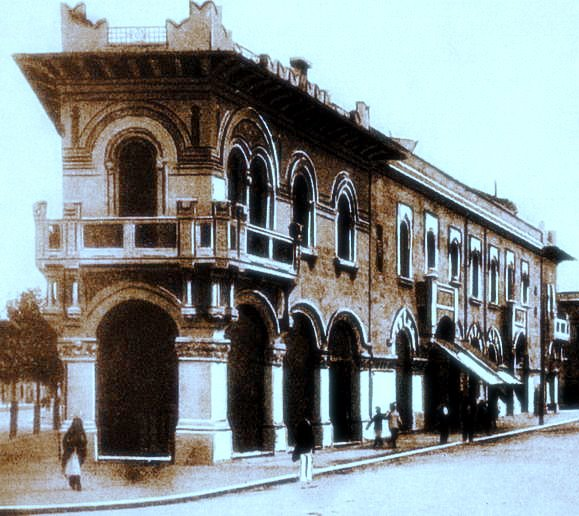
An old photo of "Palazzo Magaudda" in Messina.

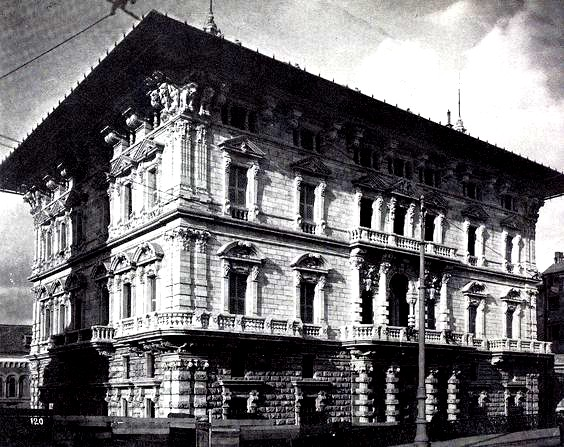
Editorial photo of "Palazzo Pastorino" in Portoria, Genoa.

Luigi "Gino" Coppedè (26 September 1866 – 20 September 1927) was an Italian architect, sculptor and decorator. He was an exponent of Art Nouveau.

== Biography ==
Coppedè was born in Florence, a son of Mariano Coppedè and brother of Adolfo Coppedè (also an architect, and occasional collaborator. Adolfo's most notable solo project was the Castello Cova (also known as the Cova Viviani Palace) of Milan).

Gino's early education was at a Pious School, and later he attended the local Florentine School of Industrial Decorative Arts, where he graduated with a diploma. He at first worked in his father's woodcarving studio between 1885 and 1890. It was here that his sculpture work developed, and he came into contact with various influential Tuscan architects. In 1889, he married Beatrice, daughter of sculptor Pasquale Romanelli, with whom he had three daughters. His first main work was the Mackenzie Castle in the Castelletto quarter of Genoa in 1890. The work was commissioned by Evan Mackenzie, a Genovese banker. This was to be his first major success, and as a result, he moved his family to Genoa. Thanks to MacKenzie, he received a number of commissions; and during this period, he was an occasional member of the Municipal Council of Genoa, on the town planning commission.

In 1891, he entered the Accademia di Belle Arti di Firenze, where he became professor of architectural design.

Between 1890 and 1893, Coppedé worked on Count Marquis Puccio's hunting castle "Villa Puccio" in Capriata d’Orba. The 1.900 sqm building is today known as Villa Val Lemme.

Several academic organizations granted him honorary degrees. He was named "Academic of Merit" at the Accademia Ligustica of Genoa, later, Academician of the "Pietro Vannucci" Perugia Academy of Fine Arts, then Academician for the Academy of Fine Arts in Urbino" and also later assumed a doctorate from the Engineering School of Rome.

Starting in 1917, Coppedè worked in Rome on a series of buildings in the Art Nouveau style, forming what would later be known as the Quartiere Coppedè ("Coppedè Quarter"). In June of the same year, he became a professor of general architecture at the University of Pisa.

Also in 1919, he was engaged in the construction of buildings in Messina under the patronage of the banking company Fratelli Cerruti Genoa. That year, he collaborated with his brothers on the decorative fitting out and furnishings of several ships owned by the Lloyd Sabaudo and Cosulich Triestina Navigation Company.

At this time, Gaetano Rapisardi, the Sicilian architect who had married one of his daughters, worked with him on several projects in his Roman studio.

In 1920, he designed the Palazzo Galli in Naples and the Villa Barsanti at Pietrasanta, among others.

In April 1920, his wife died in Genoa and the following December, his father, Mariano Coppedè. Gino, along with his brother Adolfo, then took over as directors of his father's studio "The House Artistica".

Between 1920 and 1921, he worked together with Ing. Ugolotti and Ing. GL Mellucci on the preparations for a project to move the main railway station of Rome.

In 1921, in collaboration with his brother Adolfo, during his sojourn in Lierna, he designed the Villa La Gaeta on Lake Como.

Coppedè began building the palatial residence of the Marquess of Motilla in Seville in 1924.

In 1926, he was appointed resident professor "emeritus" at the Academy of Fine Arts, Florence in Florence.

He died in Rome on 20 September 1927 after suffering from gangrene of the lungs after complications following surgery. He is buried in the family tomb at the cemetery of San Miniato in Florence.

== Commissions ==
In Capriata d'Orba

- Villa Val Lemme (Villa Puccio) 1890-1893 - Strada Val Lemme 16

In Genoa:

- Castello Mackenzie 1897–1902 – via C.Cabella 15
- Villa Coppedè 1902 – via Rossetti 33
- Castle Türke 1903 – via head of Santa Chiara 24B
- The English Cemetery section of the Staglieno Cemetery in 1904
- The Davidson Tomb 1904 – Staglieno Cemetery
- Villa Dellepiane 1904–1905 – on a private road, via Piaggio 33
- Tomb of Ernesto Puccio 1905–1907 – Staglieno Cemetery]
- Chapel of the Convent of the Sisters of Reparation (destroyed) in 1905 – via Curtatone
- The Elsag Datamat office building San Giorgio 1905–1906 – via L.Manara (Sestri Ponente)
- Villa Frisoni 1906 - Lupinari, 52021, Bucine AR, Italy
- Villa Mario Canepa 1905–1906 – on a private road, via Piaggio 41
- Villa Martini 1905–1906 – Sal.Nuova NS del Monte 5A
- Cottage Mackenzie 1905–1906 (destroyed in 1962) – Sal.Nuova NS del Monte 5C
- Villino Queirolo 1906 – Sal.Nuova NS del Monte 5B
- Villino Cogliolo 1906 – via Piaggio 44
- Palazzo Bogliolo 1906 – corso Firenze 9
- Palazzo Zuccarino 1906–1907 – via Maragliano 2
- Grand Hotel Miramare Genoa 1906–1908 – via Pagano Doria, Taormina
- Entrance to the electric railway station, Principe – Granarolo 1908 – via the Lagaccio
- Villa Micheli (Castle Bruzzo) 1904? -1910 – Via Piaggio 9
- Palazzo della Meridiana (internal restructuring) 1907? -1913 – Piazza della Meridiana
- Hotel Eden (restructuring) in 1907? -1913 – Via Casotti
- Chapel Borzino 1908–1910 – Staglieno Cemetery
- Palazzo Pastorino 1900-1910 – Via B.Bosco 57
- Palazzo Zuccarino-Cerruti 1909–1912 – Via XX Settembre
- Villino Bozzano 1910–1911 – Salita Nuova NS del Monte 5
- Adelina Davidson Nursery School 1911 – Pz. Carpaneto – Borgo Fornari – Ronco Scrivia (Ge)
- Apartment Block (attributed) 1911–1912 – Via Francesco Sivori, 10, 16136 Genova
- Apartment Profumo 1913–1914 – corso Italia 44
- Marina Exhibition and marinara Hygiene 1914 (destroyed) – Victory Square / Piazza Verdi
- Tomb of Hector Moro 1913–1924 – Staglieno Cemetery
- Villa Maria Cerruti 1914 – via Piaggio 31
- Chapel of Canali de Althaus 1921 – Staglieno Cemetery
- Villa Canali Gaslini and gatehouse 1924–1925
- Villa Maria Cerruti 1924–1925 – via Piaggio 27
- Villa Strameri 1919–1927 – via Sforza 21A

In Naples:

- the Palazzo Galli to Saint Lucia.
- Design for the accommodation Monte Echia Castel dell'Ovo
- Borgo Marinari within the Borgo Santa Lucia.

In Messina:

- The Palace Costarelli (1913) – via Tommaso Cannizzaro. The building was partially destroyed by bombing in World War II, and was rebuilt after the war. Of the original building, only a loggia and little else remains
- The Palace Tremi (also known as Palazzo del Gallo), 1914 – via Centonze, the intersection with Via Santa Cecilia
- A building (also known as the Palazzo dello Zodiaco) – Piazza Duomo
- Two Palaces for the Cerruti family of Genoa – Via Garibaldi

In Rome:

- The characterful group of houses in Rome (known as Coppedè) between Via Tagliamento and Piazza Buenos Aires is his design.
- A building in Via Veneto 7, at the junction of Piazza Barberini, just behind the Fontana delle Api.

In Pietrasanta

- The Villa Barsanti built between 1920 and 1922.

In Livorno:

- Plans for a grand bathhouse around 1926, which were not realized.

In Tuscany, near Bucine (Arezzo):

- The Lupinari Castle, the Cav.Luigi Frisoni Edward, project starting in 1906 and ending in 1908.

In Belém, Brazil:

- The Basilica of Our Lady of Nazareth of Exile, project starting in 1909

== Cultural references ==
Villa La Gaeta on Lake Como is featured as a film location for James Bond in Casino Royale.

Lyudmila Filipova in her book Dante's Antichthon published in 2010, has the main characters attempt to break the code of the Hidden City (the Quartiere Coppedè ("Coppedè Quarter")), built by Gino in Rome.

In 2016 Jonathan Meades in his BBC Four Art Documentary programme "Ben Building: Mussolini, Monuments and Modernism" (2016) attempted to create an urban myth by claiming as a jest that the song Geno by Dexys Midnight Runners was inspired by the architect.

== Sources ==
- Bossaglia, R.; M. Cozzi (1982). I Coppedè. Genoa: Sagep.
