= Madonna in a Fur Coat =

1943 novel by Sabahattin Ali

- Author: Sabahattin Ali
- Publication date: 1943
- Publication place: Turkey
- Pages: 192
- ISBN: 978-975-363-802-9
- OCLC: 18432541

Madonna in a Fur Coat (Turkish: Kürk Mantolu Madonna) is a novel written by Turkish author Sabahattin Ali. It was published in 1943.

The book tells the story of Raif, who is living a purposeless life until he meets a woman named Maria Puder. Initially, the book was criticized by many critics because "it was just another love story", but it became a bestseller in time, and is usually recalled among the best works in Turkish literature. It was translated to English by Maureen Freely and Alexander Dawe in 2016, making Sabahattin Ali one of the two Turkish authors to be included in Penguin Classics, alongside Ahmet Hamdi Tanpınar with his book, The Time Regulation Institute.

In 2025, Madonna in a Fur Coat saw renewed popularity in the United Kingdom, selling around 30,000 copies and surpassing several established classics. The resurgence was largely attributed to increased visibility on social media platforms, particularly TikTok.

== Background ==
Sabahattin Ali's daughter, Filiz Ali, in an interview with BBC, has stated that she found Maria was inspired by a real life acquaintance of Sabahattin. Sabahattin Ali, as a young man in Berlin in the 1920s, knew a woman called Maria. They sent letters to each other, and often walked together, occasionally holding hands.

== Plot summary ==
The story takes place in Ankara in the 1930s. The unnamed narrator is going through hard times of unemployment and poverty. With the help of a former friend, he finds a job as a clerk in a lumber firm. There, he shares his office with an ordinary looking man, Raif, whom he calls "the sort of man who causes us to ask ourselves: 'What do they live for? What do they find in life? What logic compels them to keep breathing?'" As they keep working together, they form a friendship.

One day, the narrator finds out that Raif has fallen ill and decides to visit him. As they talk, Raif asks his friend to destroy a notebook that is hidden in a drawer. The narrator picks up the notebook, reads a few sentences and asks Raif if he can borrow it for a day. Raif allows him to keep the notebook, but says he must destroy it after reading. The narrator walks to his home and starts reading the notebook.

The narrator "meets" a younger Raif as he reads the notebook. Ten years ago, Raif was sent to Berlin by his father to learn the art of soapmaking, with plans to return to his home in Havran to become the manager of his family's soap manufactories. But he is not interested in soapmaking, so he spends his days reading and wandering the streets. One day, he walks into an art exhibition where he sees the portrait of a woman in a fur coat. He is so intrigued by the woman in the portrait that after that day he keeps returning to the exhibition until the painter and subject, Maria Puder, introduces herself to Raif. Their first encounter goes awkwardly and Raif leaves the exhibition.

Sometime later, Raif sees a woman in a fur coat that he quickly recognizes while strolling in the streets of Berlin at night. He follows the woman to a bar called "Atlantic" and finds out that she is a performer there. After her show, Maria sits beside Raif and they form an intense platonic friendship. They start spending a lot of time together. Raif loves Maria, but she insists that she does not and cannot return his feelings, so he holds back. It is revealed that Maria grew up without a father and therefore plays a male-like, dominant role in the relationship while Raif is more naive.

They spend New Year's Eve together, drinking alcohol and dancing. Raif accompanies a drunk Maria to her home. He takes care of her, and in the morning they wake up next to each other. They have an argument, and Maria asks Raif to leave her house. Raif wanders the city for hours. He ends up at Wannsee, the site where Heinrich von Kleist and his lover committed suicide together. He remembers visiting with Maria, and ponders intimacy and purpose. Ultimately, he decides to return to Maria's house. There, he finds out that Maria has taken ill, and has been hospitalized.

Raif rushes into the hospital, and begs his way inside. There he finds a sick Maria, who is finally convinced that Raif is not like any other man and actually is in love with her. Maria admits that she loves Raif. They spend the next month at the hospital until they decide to leave the hospital for home-care.

Maria soon regains her strength, but Raif finds out that his father died and decides he needs to leave for Havran. Maria too decides to leave Berlin to live with her mother in Prague, until Raif settles in Turkey and invites her to live with him. When he finally reaches Turkey, he sees that his brother-in-laws have claimed a big portion of the inheritance. He is given a "wasteland" to farm. While he works in his olive fields, his only source of joy is Maria's letters, until one day the letters stop coming. In one of her last letters, Maria says she has got a surprise that she will only reveal when they see each other face to face. When she stops sending letters, Raif thinks Maria too has betrayed him and is heartbroken. He has lost his will to live, and eventually marries a woman that he doesn't like, and lives with her in between the furniture he bought for Maria. He believes that if even Maria betrayed him, then not another person on Earth is worth his trust and alienates himself from the society. Raif finds a job as a German translator in a lumber firm.

Ten years later, an old acquaintance of Raif from Berlin, who is also a relative of Maria, meets Raif in Ankara. She travels with a nine-year-old girl. She reveals that Maria has died from a sickness nine years ago, and she left a baby girl, whose father was a "Turkish man she refused to name." Raif feels guilty for not trusting Maria and regrets alienating himself.

In the current timeline, the narrator finishes reading Raif's notebook. He goes to Raif's house to give back the notebook, but Raif has died. The narrator goes to their office, sits at Raif's desk, and turns back to the first page.

== Film adaptation ==
The international film Love in Vietnam, based on the novel, was announced at the 2024 Cannes Film Festival. It features Indian actors Shantanu Maheshwari and Avneet Kaur, alongside Vietnamese actress Kha Ngan. Directed by Rahhat Shah Kazmi and produced by Omung Kumar, the film marks the first India-Vietnam collaboration. The film was released in 2025.

== Translations ==
- 2019, Urdu: Madonna, Translated by Huma Anwar, ISBN 9789696521570
- 2025, Persian (Farsi): مادونای با پالتوی خز, translated by Aydin Farangi ISBN 978-622-87512-1-4
