= Barry Rubin =

Israeli academic (1950–2014)

Barry Rubin

Barry M. Rubin (Hebrew: בארי רובין) (28 January 1950 – February 3, 2014) was an American-born Israeli writer and academic on terrorism and Middle Eastern affairs.

== Career ==
Rubin was the director of the Global Research in International Affairs (GLORIA) Center, editor of the Middle East Review of International Affairs (MERIA) and a professor at the Interdisciplinary Center (IDC) in Herzliya, Israel. He was the editor of the GLORIA center website. The GLORIA center has since been renamed to the Rubin Center in his honor. He was also editor of the journal Turkish Studies.

His book Israel: An Introduction was published by Yale University Press in 2012. Rubin's later books include:

- The Israel-Arab Reader,
- The Long War for Freedom: The Arab Struggle for Democracy in the Middle East, and
- The Truth About Syria.

His last book, entitled Silent Revolution (2014), describes how the Left rose to political power and cultural dominance in the USA during recent years.

== Media ==
Rubin was a guest on This Week with David Brinkley, Nightline, Face the Nation, The MacNeil-Lehrer NewsHour, The Larry King Show, and others on CBS News, CNN, Fox News, and MSNBC. Among the newspapers around the world for which he has written are La Vanguardia in Spain, the Frankfurter Allgemeine Zeitung in Germany; The National Post and The Globe and Mail in Canada; La Opinión, Liberal Forum, and Limes in Italy; The Age, The Australian, The Sydney Morning Herald, and The Australian Financial Review in Australia; Zaman, Referans, and Radikal in Turkey; and The Pioneer in India. Rubin was a frequent contributor to the Middle East column in The Jerusalem Post. His Rubin Reports columns dating back to November, 2011 appeared in The Jewish Press.

== Personal life ==
Rubin was born in Washington, D.C., and was married to Judith Colp Rubin. He died of lung cancer on February 3, 2014, in Tel Aviv after an 18-month illness.
