= Bahadır Kaleağası =

President of the Bosphorus Institute

- Born: 24 November 1966; Istanbul, Turkey
- Citizenship: Belgium, Turkey
- Education: Istanbul University; Université libre de Bruxelles
- Writing career
- Language: Turkish, French, English
- Subjects: Economics, European politics, International Relations

Bahadır Kaleağası is a Turkish writer and expert in international relations, European politics, and business strategy. He is currently President of the Bosphorus Institute and a member of BusinessEurope's executive bureau. From 2017 to 2020, he was the Secretary-General (CEO) of TUSIAD – the Turkish Industry & Business Association. His research focuses on the economic relationships between the European Union, the United States, and Turkey.

== Early life and education ==
Kaleagasi was born in Istanbul on 24 November 1966. In 1985, he graduated from Galatasaray High School after spending a year abroad as an exchange student in South Carolina at South Aiken High School. After moving to Brussels, he studied at the Université libre de Bruxelles, graduating with degrees in international relations, European Union law and European economics. He then went on to study at Istanbul University, the oldest institution in the country's history, earning a PhD in international relations. Awarded with NATO's research fellowship and the European Commission's Jean Monnet Programme, he attended Harvard University, Georgetown University, and Jerusalem University as a visiting scholar, conducting research in global economics and European integration.

== Career ==
From 1989 to 1996, Kaleagasi worked as a researcher and lecturer at ULB's Institute of European Studies. In 1996, he was chosen as the permanent representative of TUSIAD, the Turkish Business and Industry Association, which has offices in Brussels, Berlin, Paris, Washington DC, and Beijing. He was then appointed as TUSIAD's International Co-ordinator in 2008 and as Secretary-General (CEO) in 2016. He is currently the President of the Bosphorus Institute, a think-tank based in Paris and Istanbul which aims to bolster economic and political ties between France and Turkey. He is also the founding President of environmental protection association TEMA's European branch, as well as honorary chairman of the Brussels Energy Club.

== Publications ==
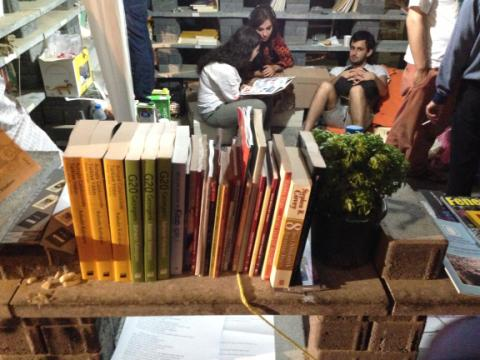
Kaleagasi's books in an urban library during the Gezi Park protests

Kaleagasi is the author of From Single Market to Monetary Union (1995), The Roadmap to Europe (2003), European Galaxy and the Turkish Star (2007), Future of Europe, Questions of the Youth (2010), Planet G20 (2012), and Planet G20 II (2015). He is also the co-author of Towards a New Europe (1993), Les Défis de l'Elargissement de l'Union Européenne (1994), La Turquie en Mouvement (1995), and La République Laique Turque (2003).

In 2013, the German Marshall Fund published Kaleagasi's article "Avoiding a Shrinking EU in an Expanding Planet". In this piece, he establishes four scenarios for the European Union's future: Europa Mercatus (single-market integration), Europa Nostrum (political integration), Europa Progressio (differentiated integration), and Europa Et Cetera (stagnation).

== Media ==
Kaleagasi is a regular commentator for Radikal, Finans Dunyasi, Anadolu Finans, and Bloomberg HT. He has appeared as a guest analyzing economic and political issues related to Turkey, the European Union, and global politics on European Voice, France 3, France 24, Bloomberg HT, Sky TV, and Le Monde.

On 2 December 2016, he was featured in Taha Akyol's talk show on CNN Turk, one of the most widely viewed programmes in the country. In this segment, Kaleagasi discussed the state of world affairs with Taha Akyol and Prof. Serhat Guvenc. This included the outcome of the US elections 2016, the European Union's future stability, and the impact of increasing technological progress such as big data and artificial intelligence.
