= Maureen Freely =

American novelist (born 1952)

Maureen Freely FRSL
- Born: July 1952 (age 73–74); Neptune, New Jersey, U.S.
- Education: Harvard College
- Occupations: Novelist, professor, translator, and journalist
- Employer: University of Warwick
- Spouse: Paul Spike(1976-1989) Frank Longstreth (2009-2012)
- Children: 4 children; 2 stepchildren
- Parent: John Freely (father)

Maureen Deidre Freely (born July 1952) is an American novelist, professor, and translator. She has worked on the Warwick Writing Programme, University of Warwick, since 1996.

== Biography ==
Born in Neptune, New Jersey, United States, she is the daughter of author John Freely. She has a sister, Eileen, and a brother, Brendan. Maureen Freely grew up in Turkey. She graduated from Harvard College. She now lives in England.

She is the mother of four children and two step-children. Her first husband was Paul Spike, with whom she had a son and a daughter. Her second husband was Frank Longstreth, with whom she had two daughters. Freely is a fourth-generation atheist.

== Work ==
Freely lectures at the University of Warwick and is an occasional contributor to The Guardian and The Independent newspapers. From 2014 to 2021, she served as President/Chair of English PEN, the founding centre of PEN International. She was later made an Honorary Vice President.

Four of her eight novels – The Life of the Party (1986), Enlightenment (2008), Sailing Through Byzantium (2013), and My Blue Peninsula (2023) – are set in Turkey. She is also the author of The Other Rebecca (2000), a contemporary version of Daphne du Maurier's classic 1938 novel Rebecca. Freely is an occasional contributor to Cornucopia, a magazine about Turkey.

She is best known as the Turkish-into-English translator of Orhan Pamuk's recent novels. She worked closely with Pamuk on these translations, because they often serve as the basis when his work is translated into other languages. They were both educated simultaneously at Robert College in Istanbul, although they did not know each other at the time. Marie Arana praised Freely's translations of Pamuk works like Snow, Istanbul: Memories and the City, and The Museum of Innocence as "vibrant and nimble" translations.

Freely translated and wrote an introduction to Fethiye Çetin's 2008 memoir, My Grandmother. She went on to translate its sequel, The Grandchildren, as well as Tuba Çandar's biography of the assassinated Turkish-Armenian journalist Hrant Dink. Freely has also translated or co-translated 20th century Turkish classics by such authors as Ahmet Hamdi Tanpınar, Sait Faik Abasıyanık, Sabahattin Ali, Suat Derviş, Sevgi Soysal, and Tezer Özlü.

Freely was elected a Fellow of the Royal Society of Literature in 2012.

== Bibliography ==
=== Novels ===
- Mother's Helper (1979)
- The Life of the Party (1985)
- The Stork Club (UK, 1992; published in the U.S. as My Year with the Stork Club, 1993)
- Under the Vulcania (novella, 1994)
- The Other Rebecca (1996)
- Enlightenment (2007)
- Sailing Through Byzantium (2013)
- My Blue Peninsula (2023)

=== Nonfiction ===
- What About Us?: An Open Letter to the Mothers Feminism Forgot (1995)
- The Parent Trap: Children, Families and the New Morality (2002)

=== Translations ===
of Orhan Pamuk:

- The Black Book
- Snow
- Other Colors: Essays and a story
- Istanbul: Memories and the City
- The Museum of Innocence

of Fethiye Çetin:

- My Grandmother (2008)
- The Grandchildren (2014) (authored with Ayşe Gül Altınay)

of Ahmet Hamdi Tanpınar:

- The Time Regulation Institute (2014) (translated with Alexander Dawe)

of Sait Faik Abasıyanık:

- A Useless Man (2014) (translated with Alexander Dawe)

of Sabahattin Ali:

- Madonna in a Fur Coat (2016) (Translated with Alexander Dawe)

of Tuba Çandar:

- Hrant Dink : An Armenian Voice of the Voiceless in Turkey (2016)

of Suat Derviş:

- In the Shadow of the Yali (2021)

of Sevgi Soysal:

- Dawn (2022)

of Tezer Özlü:

- Cold Nights of Childhood (2023)
