= Manisa case =

Trials in Turkey

Manisa case or Manisa trial (Turkish: Manisa davası or Turkish: Manisalı gençler olayı, lit. 'Manisa youth' event') is the colloquial name given by the press and the public for the case opened in Manisa, Turkey on 26 December 1995 against 16 youth, most of whom were high school students, who were alleged to be members of a secret organization, and the subsequent cases opened against police officers for the allegation of torture during detention. The cases continued for a long time and became the symbol of struggle for human rights in Turkey.

While the detained youth were prosecuted for graffiti and membership of an illegal organization, the police officers were prosecuted for torturing the youth. At the end of the prosecution process, which took many years, the youth were acquitted, while the involved police officers were sentenced to a total of 85 years for torture.

Hüseyin Korkut, one of the youth that suffered torture and remained under arrest for 3.5 months, novelized what he lived through during the treatment process of his trauma. Excerpts from the novel were published as a serial in Radikal newspaper, between 25 October and 1 December 2007.

== Initial raids and detainment ==
Events had started with the house raids and subsequent detainment of 16 youth in Manisa. The reason for detainment was stated as graffitiing "No to paid education" (Turkish: Paralı eğitime hayır) on a rail wagon. The youth were detained in Manisa Police Department after the operation, with no explanation given to them or their families. The youth were accused of graffiti, distributing leaflets, throwing Molotov cocktails, and being members of a secret organization. The youths' families understood that they had been subjected to torture after seeing their kids with prosecutorial permit, and galvanized the public opinion. The families filed a criminal complaint against the police officers in charge, and held a press conference with Sabri Ergül, a member of the Parliament from Republican People's Party at the time. Thereupon, Manisa Public Prosecution Office sued the said police officers for the reason of torture.

== Trial of the Manisa youth ==
The youth were taken to the court after they were remanded in custody for a while. During the prosecution process, which continued for many years, a remark of one of the youth' mothers became a symbol of the case: "Don't take away my daughter, she is still very young!" (Götürmeyin kızımı, o daha çok küçük!). The case in the Manisa Criminal Court of Peace ended with the acquittal of the youth for graffiti on 14 March 1997. On 28 October 2000, the State Security Court in İzmir also acquitted the youth, due to the fact that their' statements were taken under torture and there was no other evidence.

== Trial of the police officers ==
After the criminal complaint lodged by Sabri Ergül and the youth' families, Manisa Public Prosecution Office sued 10 police officers, who conducted the investigation against the youth, on 14 June 1996 for torture. Police officers did not join most of the court hearings. During the proceedings, Sabri Ergül put a placard to the door of Manisa police headquarters that read "There is torture in this workplace" (Bu işyerinde işkence var), in order to get the attention of the press and public opinion.

At the end of the trial in Manisa High Criminal Court, ten suspect police officers were acquitted. After this, the Court of Cassation overturned the decision, as "all of the victims have been subjected physical and psychological torture". After rehearing, the local court decided to acquit all suspects for a second time. The General Assembly of Criminal Chambers in Court of Cassation overturned the decision again. İzmir State Security Court handed out acquittals to five suspects, and between two-and-a-half and twelve-and-a-half years of imprisonment to ten suspects. The Court of Cassation had overturned the decision given by the İzmir State Security Court, citing that the court had incompletely examined the case, without waiting and considering the other trials about the acts on other courts. All suspected police officers were sentenced to a total of 85 years' imprisonment on 15 October 2000. The verdict became final when the 8th Criminal Chamber of the Court of Cassation upheld it after the review of appeal on 4 April 2003.

== Novel of Hüseyin Korkut ==
Hüseyin Korkut, who has been one of the Manisa youth and a student of Karadeniz Technical University at the time of detainment, remained under arrest for three-and-half months in Buca Prison. He couldn't finish school, and was treated for depression for ten years in response to the trauma he had due to torture. As a part of the treatment process, he wrote his experiences into a novel. During the process of writing, he was supported by Can Dündar, one of the journalists who closely watched the case. Radikal newspaper had published sections from Korkut's novel between 25 October - 1 December 2007 as a serial, titled as "Ateş Manisa'ya Düştü" (lit. 'The fire fell to Manisa').
