= Yiğit Bulut =

Turkish journalist (1972–2025)

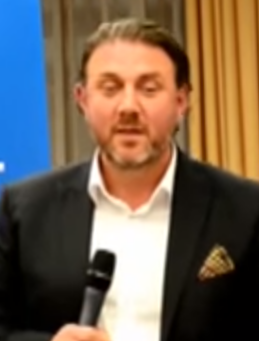
Yiğit Bulut

Yiğit Bulut (1 January 1972 – 11 July 2025) was a Turkish journalist, conspiracy theorist, and from July 2013, a senior advisor to president Recep Tayyip Erdoğan. He was editor-in-chief at news channels Habertürk TV (2009–2012) and Kanal 24 (2012–2013). He was also a contributor to the daily newspapers Radikal (2001–2007), Vatan and Referans (until 2009), Habertürk (2009–2012) and Star (2012–2013). He was appointed a senior advisor to current president Recep Tayyip Erdoğan while he was serving as prime minister in July 2013. His appointment drew criticism for remarks he had made about the 2013 protests in Turkey that had alleged various conspiracies aimed at toppling Erdoğan, including a claim that foreign forces were trying to murder Erdoğan using "telekinesis and other methods".

== Background ==
Bulut was born in Keşan, Edirne on 1 January 1972. His father Mustafa Bulut was elected a deputy for the Justice Party in 1977. Bulut was a graduate of the Galatasaray High School and Bilkent University.

Bulut was married to Şule Zeybek, a television presenter on Doğan Media Group's Kanal D; they divorced in 2010. On 11 July 2025, Bulut died at an Istanbul hospital where he had been receiving treatment for pancreatic cancer. He was 53. One day later, he was buried at Karacaahmet Cemetery.

== Career ==
Bulut wrote columns for the Doğan Media Group's Radikal daily from 2001 to 2007. Bulut also wrote for the group's Vatan and Referans newspapers and presented a show on the group's CNN Türk station. In June 2009, he left the group, after some of his articles criticising the Editor-in-Chief of Hürriyet, another Doğan newspaper, were censored. He transferred to the Ciner Group's Habertürk newspaper and Habertürk TV television station, becoming Habertürk TV's editor-in-chief until January 2012.

In 2010, at a prime ministerial meeting with journalists, Bulut asked prime minister Recep Tayyip Erdoğan for a regulator for internet and print media, an equivalent to the RTÜK for radio and television, to allow more government control over print and internet media. The proposal was sharply criticised by many in the media.

After leaving Habertürk in 2012 Bulut later became editor-in-chief of the Star Media Group's news channel Kanal 24, and a columnist for its Star newspaper before being appointed chief advisor to prime minister Recep Tayyip Erdoğan in July 2013.

== Conspiracy theories ==
Bulut said about the 2013 protests in Turkey that had alleged various conspiracies aimed at toppling Erdoğan, including a claim that foreign forces were trying to murder Erdoğan using "telekinesis and other methods". In 2016, at an interview he said that foreign chefs on Turkish television shows are undercover spies and that Turkish people should be on alert.
