= Sabahattin Ali =

Turkish novelist, short-story writer, poet, and journalist (1907-1948)

- Sabahattin Ali
- Born: 25 February 1907; Eğridere, Gümülcine, Adrianople vilayet, Ottoman Empire (modern Ardino, Bulgaria)
- Died: 2 April 1948 (aged 41); Kırklareli, Turkey
- Occupations: Author, poet, journalist
- Spouse: Aliye Ali (m. 1935)
- Children: Filiz Ali
- Relatives: Selahattin Ali (Father), Husniye Ali (Mother), Saniye Süheyla Conkman (1922–2017) Sister
- Writing career
- Period: 1926–1947
- Notable works: Kuyucaklı Yusuf (1937); İçimizdeki Şeytan (1940); Madonna in a Fur Coat (Turkish: Kürk Mantolu Madonna) (1943)
- Movements: Realism, social realism

Sabahattin Ali (25 February 1907 – 2 April 1948) was a Turkish novelist, short-story writer, poet, and journalist.

== Early life ==
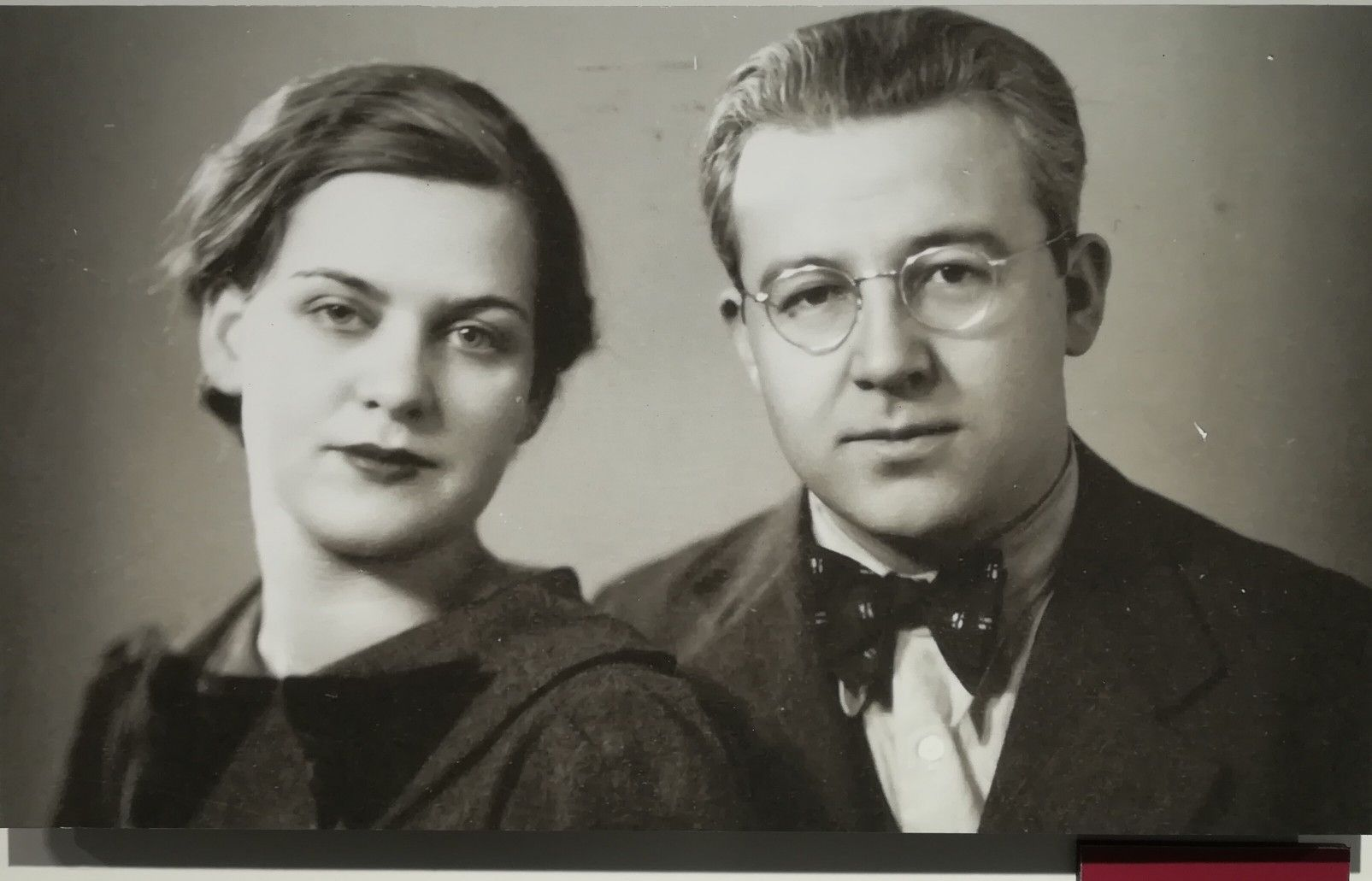
Sabahattin Ali and his wife, Aliye Ali.

Sabahattin Ali was born in 1907 in Eğridere township (now Ardino in southern Bulgaria) of the Sanjak of Gümülcine (now Komotini in northern Greece), in the Ottoman Empire. He was born to, Selahattin Ali, an Ottoman officer, and Husniye. His father's family were from the Black Sea region.

Ali lived in Istanbul, Çanakkale and Edremit before he entered the Teacher School in Balıkesir. His elementary and middle school education was interrupted by WWI, contributing to his difficult childhood. He was then transferred from Balikesir to the School of Education in Istanbul, where he graduated in 1926 with a teacher's certificate. His various poems and short stories were published in the school’s student paper. After serving as a teacher in Yozgat for one year, he earned a fellowship from the Ministry of National Education and studied in Potsdam, Germany from 1928 to 1930. When he returned to Turkey, he taught German language in high schools in Aydın and Konya.

== Later years ==
While he was serving as a teacher in Konya, he was arrested for a poem he wrote criticizing Atatürk's policies, and accused of libelling two other journalists. He wrote a poem to Atatürk later stating "I was sentenced to prison for 1 year. What saddens me the most is not the sentence, but that your name is dragged into this as a means of personal revenge. I did not do such a thing and I want you to believe it. I ask for forgiveness. I can prove my innocence to an unprejudiced court free of ill thoughts and needless fears".

Having served his sentence for several months in Konya and then in the Sinop Fortress Prison, he was released in 1933 in an amnesty granted to mark the 10th anniversary of the declaration of the Republic of Turkey. He then applied to the Ministry of National Education for permission to teach again. After proving his allegiance to Atatürk by writing the poem "Benim Aşkım" (literally: My Love or My Passion), he was assigned to the publications division at the Ministry of National Education. Sabahattin Ali married Aliye on 16 May 1935 and had a daughter, Filiz. He did his military service in 1936. He was called back to military service twice during WWII, like most Turkish adult men at the time. He was imprisoned again and released in 1944.

Ali founded and edited a popular weekly magazine called Marko Paşa (pronounced "Marco Pasha"), together with Aziz Nesin and Rıfat Ilgaz. In the period between 1941 and 1944 he was among the directors of a monthly sociology journal entitled Yurt ve Dünya based in Ankara. He was among the contributors of the literary magazine Adımlar in 1944.

== Social Realism and Sabahattin Ali ==
Sabahattin Ali's stories were about the daily struggles of ordinary and poor people in cities and rural Anatolia, where he had been appointed as clerk and worked for years. Some of his books and stories have the theme of conflict between classes, such as Kuyucaklı Yusuf.

Sabahattin Ali's stories are texts built on the conflict that forms the basis of dialectical materialism. In the stories where social class conflict is the main theme, the class structure of society according to socio-economic preconditions, the differentiation of classes within the social structure, inter-class relations (conflict, reconciliation and change), the creation of personality by the social structure, the relationship between power and coercion and the means of oppression can be presented as some of the thematic determinations.

His stories about the people who live in rural Anatolia focus on the social injustice, corruption, and mismanagement by bureaucracy in those areas. Some stories such as Kağnı, focus on the relationships and hierarchy between men and women, landlord and tenant, rich and poor, government officials and villagers.

Kağnı is a story in which Sabahattin Ali depicts the rotten order that has become entrenched in the villages in an impressive way. In this story, the son of an agha kills poor Sarı Mehmet over a field dispute. After this event, Sarı Mehmet's old mother's despair is described. The news of his death is presented in the opening part of the story almost like a newspaper report. Because of a field issue, Savrukların Hüseyin shot Sarı Mehmet in Arkbaşı (Ali, 2002:163). This short and striking statement also draws attention to the fact that villagers are known by their nicknames. Sabahattin Ali, who depicts the murders caused by water, road or land disputes in the village in his stories, sheds light on the world of emotions and thoughts of the villagers in the story Kağnı. The imam and other villagers gather in the café after the murder. The identity of the murderer changes the course of the event. Money is the main determinant of relationship networks in the village. While it is expected that steps will be taken to ensure justice by trusting the judicial mechanisms, the old mother is left alone. It is noteworthy that the woman goes to the coffee house to this group of men. The villagers gathered around Hüseyin's father Mevlüt Ağa in the café. This gathering and the dialog with the old woman are indicators of the oppressor-oppressed relationship. Power relations are at the forefront in the attempts to persuade the old woman not to file a complaint with imperious attitudes. The helplessness of the oppressed villagers and the indifference of some bureaucrats and officials are emphasized. The apparatus of power permeates every part of the village. It is seen that the injustice that dominates social relations is taken for granted. The fact that state officials do not protect the villagers, and that attitudes are taken according to economic power causes the villagers, who have lost their fields to the landlord, to internalize helplessness.

== The Censorship against his works and convictions ==
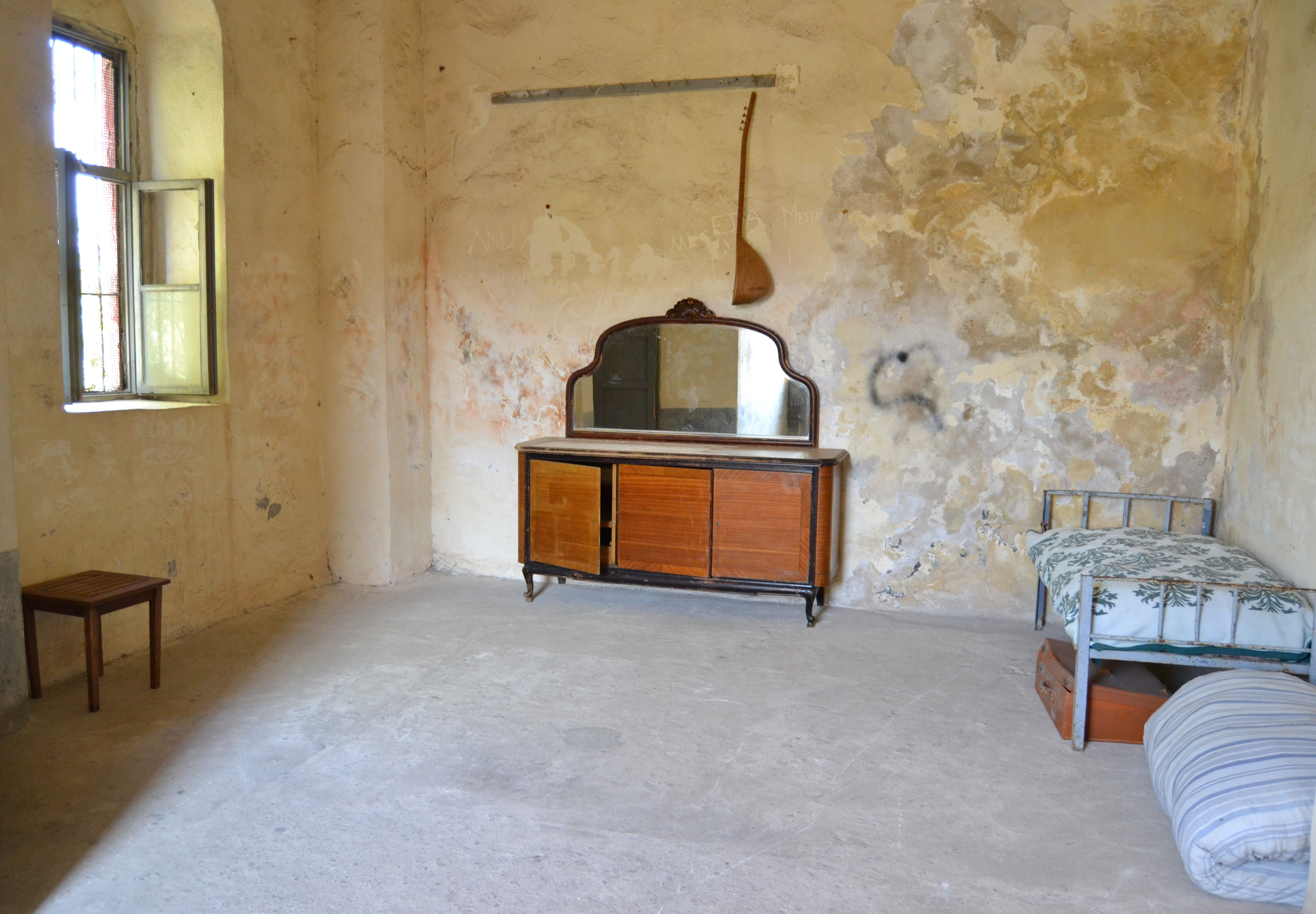
Sabahattin Ali's prison cell at Sinop Fortress Prison.

Sabahattin Ali, being a supporter of social realism, had published books, poems and articles that were censored and banned by the Government of Turkey at that time. He was arrested and sent to prison for three months in 1931, due to allegations that whilst working as a German teacher at a middle school, he had produced propaganda. In 1932, he was accused of insulting Mustafa Kemal, and was sent to Sinop Fortress Prison, where he spent almost a year until he was released with the Blanket clemency of 1933, thanks to the 10th anniversary of the Republic of Turkey. He could not be a teacher again but he started working as a clerk. In February 1937, one of his best known books, Kuyucaklı Yusuf, was published, but later it was censored and banned by the Government for "Opposing the family life and military conscription". In 1944, two of his books, Değirmen and Dağlar ve Rüzgâr, were banned by the Government. In 1946, he began publishing a magazine called Marko Paşa, which was later banned by the Government in 1947. After this, he published a series of other magazines called Merhumpaşa, Malumpaşa and Alibaba which were also later banned. In 1947, he published another book, Sırça Köşk, which was also banned by the decision of Council of Ministers shortly afterwards, as the book criticised the government.

His longest prison sentence was for 14 months at Sinop fortress prison, where he wrote many poems and a few stories, involving the prison. One of the poems, "Prison Song V" (also known as "Aldırma Gönül") was set to music by Turkish musician Kerem Güney years later and became popular.

== Death ==
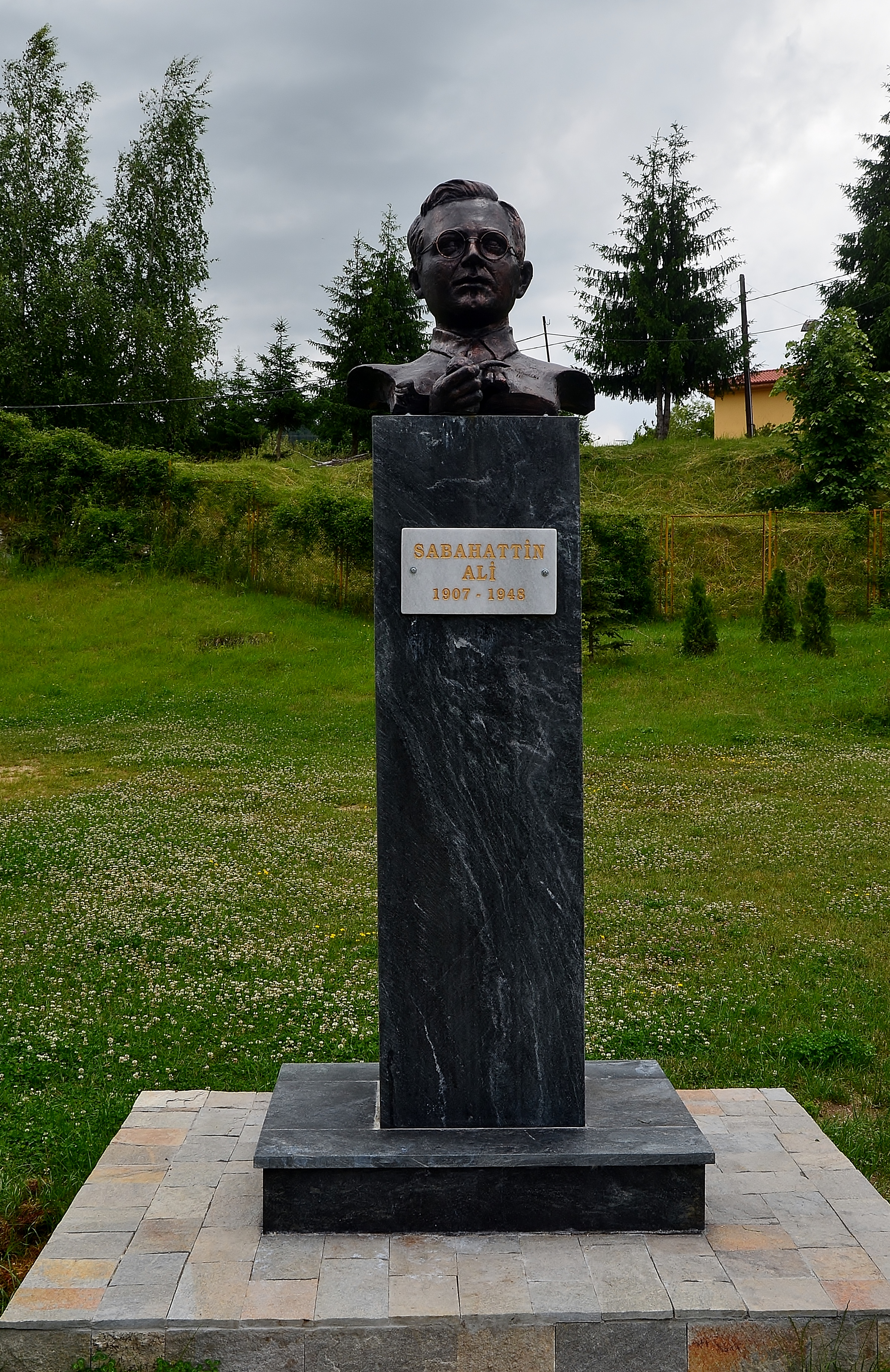
Bust of Sabahattin Ali in his birthplace at Ardino, Kardzhali Province, Bulgaria.

Upon his release from prison, he suffered financial troubles. His application for a passport was denied. He was killed at the Bulgarian border, probably on 1 or 2 April 1948. His body was found on 16 June 1948. It is generally believed that he was killed by Ali Ertekin, a smuggler with connections to the National Security Service, who had been paid to help him pass the border. Another hypothesis is that Ertekin handed him over to the security services, and he was killed during interrogation.

Aziz Nesin, another socialist Turkish writer, was a close friend of Sabahattin Ali and he was asked to come to the prosecutor's office during the investigation following Ali's death. He wrote about the conversation between him and the prosecutor during the meeting in his book "Birlikte Yaşadıklarım Birlikte Öldüklerim" as following:

"The prosecutor's name was either Davas or Davasli, as far as I remember. I was across the prosecutor's desk. The prosecutor said,

-We've called you to testify, I'll show you some things, if you know whose they are, tell me!

He took out a pair of trousers from a white cloth bag under the table. At first glance I recognized them as Sabahattin's trousers... Woolen fabric, taupe colored, brown checkered...

The prosecutor asked:

- Do you know who it was?

At that time, we were living in such difficult conditions, in such a depressed, oppressive period, we were facing such injustices, we were being thrown into prisons for such made up reasons that we were suspicious of everything, we were afraid.The prosecutor holds a friend's trousers in his hand and asks you, “Whose trousers are these?” You never know what would happen afterwards. Even if you are innocent, you cannot escape punishment.There were many times when we were imprisoned for five or six months until our innocence was established in court.

- "No, I don't know..." I said.

The prosecutor calmly took out a broken pipe from the bag where he had put the pants.

- Do you know whose pipe this is?

Sabahattin was a unique person, not only in his behavior, face and speech, but also in the way he dressed. His belongings were immediately recognizable. I recognized Sabahattin's pipe, which was broken. I felt frightened.

I said, “I don't know".

This time the prosecutor took out a notebook from the bag, opened it and showed me. Most of the writings were old fashioned handwriting. Of course I recognized Sabahattin's handwriting. I told you everything about him was original; Sabahattin used green ink.

" Do you know who these writings belong to?" he asked.

Honestly, after all the things that had happened to me, I had no trust in the justice that was being administered. I didn't know whether it was appropriate to tell the truth or not. But when I saw Sabahattin's writing in green ink, I shuddered, sensing that something bad was going on.

Without waiting for my answer, the prosecutor took out broken glasses from the bag. The lenses of Sabahattin's rimless silver stemmed glasses, broken lenses...

The prosecutor must have realized how shaken and upset I was, because this time he didn't ask anything. He said:

- A body was found in the bushes on the Bulgarian border, this item was found on the body, and it is believed to be Sabahattin Ali's.

I looked at the broken glasses in the prosecutor's hand, my eyes welled up with tears.

The prosecutor took out Sabahattin Ali's jacket from the bag.

- I said, “Yes, it belongs to Sabahattin"...

My voice was trembling.

There were dried blood stains on the jacket.

I cannot remember now whether the prosecutor took my written statement or not.

Prosecutor said:

- We are investigating a murder. For the prosecution to be safe, don't tell anyone that you saw Sabahattin Ali's belongings, don't tell anyone about our conversation here....

I held back my tears, staying silent. I went outside...

The murder was solved months later according to official records. Ali Ertekin, who had been discharged from the army and had apparently smuggled people across the border to Bulgaria before, went to the police months after Sabahattin Ali's disappearance and told them that he had killed Sabahattin Ali. Ertekin said that he had agreed with Sabahattin Ali to smuggle him across the Bulgarian border in exchange for money, but that he committed the murder because “his national feelings were aroused when he expressed his communist ideas and his desire to divide the country”. After the trial, Ertekin was sentenced to only 4 years in prison and was released after serving 2 years. The real motive behind the murder, and how it was committed remain unknown to this day.

Sabahattin Ali's 100th birth anniversary was celebrated in the city of Ardino, Bulgaria on 31 March 2007. Ali is a well-known author in Bulgaria. His books have been read in schools in Bulgaria since the 1950s and he is especially well-regarded by the country's Turkish minority.

== Legacy ==
His short novel "Madonna in a Fur Coat" (1943) is considered one of the best novellas in Turkish literature. Translated versions have recently hit bestsellers lists and have sold a record number of copies in his country of birth. It first appeared on the pages of the daily Hakikat, 1941–42, in 48 installments. With this novel, Sabahattin Ali became one of 2 Turkish novelists (together with Ahmet Hamdi Tanpınar's "The Time Regulation Institute") whose works were published as Penguin Classics, was translated by Maureen Freely and Alexander Dawe and with a scholarly introduction by David Selim Sayers.

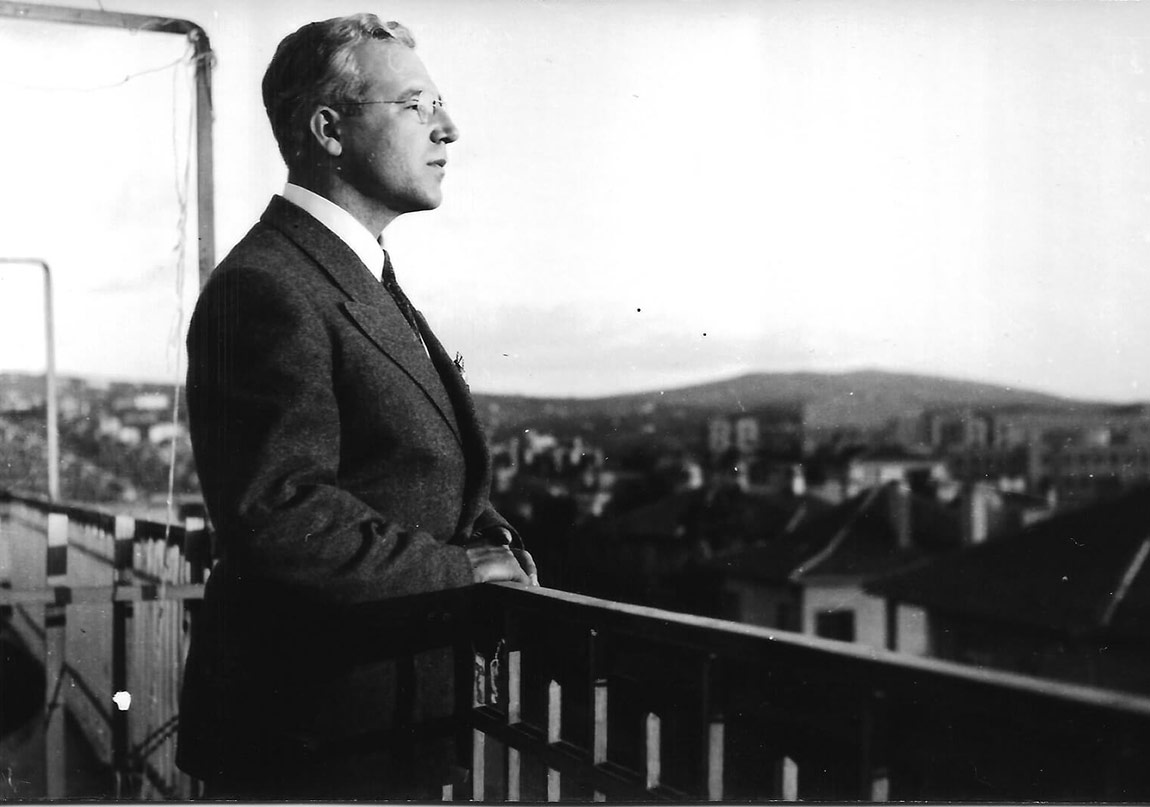
Sabahattin Ali, date and location unknown.

== Bibliography ==
=== Short stories ===
- "Değirmen" (1935) (Mill)
- "Kağnı" (1936) (Oxcart)
- "Ses" (1937) (Voice)
- "Yeni Dünya" (1943) (New World)
- "Sırça Köşk" (1947) (The Glass Palace)

=== Plays ===
- Esirler (1936) (Prisoners)

=== Novels ===
- Kuyucaklı Yusuf (1937) (Yusuf of Kuyucak). Kuyucakli Yusuf was made into a movie by Turkish national television.
- İçimizdeki Şeytan (1940) (Devil Inside)
- Kürk Mantolu Madonna (1943). (Madonna in a Fur Coat)

=== Translation ===
- Tarihte Garip Vakalar (Strange Cases in History): Ankara, 1936
- Antigone, Sophokles: Istanbul, 1941
- Üç Romantik Hikaye (Three Romantic Stories): Ankara, 1943
- Fontamara, Ignazio Silone: Ankara, 1943
- Gyges ve Yüzüğü (En. Gyges and his Ring, Deutch: Gyges und sein Ring), Christian F. Hebbel: Ankara, 1944

In 2016, Madonna in a Fur Coat was translated into English by Maureen Freely and Alexander Dawe and published by Penguin Classics; the translation was reissued in 2021 with a new, scholarly introduction by David Selim Sayers.

=== Poetry ===
- Dağlar ve Rüzgâr (1934 - Second Edition 1943). (Mountains and Wind)

== See also ==
- Turkish literature
- "Sabahattin Ali", by Asim Bezirci, 1974, paperback.
