= Love in Vietnam =

2025 Indian-Vietnamese film

- Theatrical release poster
- Directed by: Rahat Shah Kazmi
- Screenplay by: Rahat Shah Kazmi; Kritika Rampal
- Based on: Madonna in a Fur Coat by Sabahattin Ali
- Produced by: Captain Rahul Bali; Omung Kumar; Rahhat Shah Kazmi; Sarvesh Goel; Pankaj Chauhan; Muhammad Antulay; Saahil Sheikh; Abhishek Ankur; Tariq Khan; Zeba Sajid
- Starring: Shantanu Maheshwari; Avneet Kaur; Khả Ngân
- Cinematography: Dudley
- Edited by: Sanjay Sankla
- Music by: Score: Tuhin K. Biswas; Songs: Meet Bros; Amaal Malik; Rashid Khan; Aamir Ali
- Production companies: Zee Studios; Innovations India; Blue Lotus Pictures; Rahhat Shah Kazmi Films; Zebaish Entertainment; Tariq Khan Production; Mango Tree Entertainmen; AND Productions; Samten Hills Dalat
- Distributed by: Zee Studios (India); Reliance Entertainment (Worldwide); Shanghai YC Media and Film (China)
- Release dates: 1 July 2025 (DANAFF); 12 September 2025 (India); 9 January 2026 (Vietnam)
- Running time: 132 minutes
- Countries: India; Vietnam
- Languages: Hindi; Vietnamese

Love in Vietnam (Vietnamese: Vạn dặm yêu em, old title: Yêu từ cái nhìn đầu tiên) is a 2025 Indian-Vietnamese romantic drama film written and directed by Rahat Shah Kazmi. The film was produced by Captain Rahul Bali, Omung Kumar and Rahat Shah Kazmi. It is based on the novel Madonna in a Fur Coat, and features Shantanu Maheshwari, Avneet Kaur and Khả Ngân with legendary actors Raj Babbar, Farida Jalal and Gulshan Grover in supporting roles.

Principal photography commenced in September 2024 at Samten Hills Da Lat and in other parts of Vietnam and took two months to complete. The film was released in India on 12 September 2025 and in Việtnam on 9 January 2026.

== Cast ==
- Shantanu Maheshwari as Manav
- Avneet Kaur as Simmi
- Khả Ngân as Linh
- Farida Jalal as Bebbe
- Raj Babbar as Soorma Singh
- Gulshan Grover as Pankaj
- Mir Sarwar as Simmi's father
- Saquib Ayub as Harbinder Singh
- John Nhia as Tung
- Krishika Patel as Dolly
- Kusum Tickoo as Simmi's mother
- Monica Aggarwal as Ms. Monica
- Tahir Ashraf as HE Dr Sethi - Consul General and later Ambassador of India to Vietnam

== Production ==
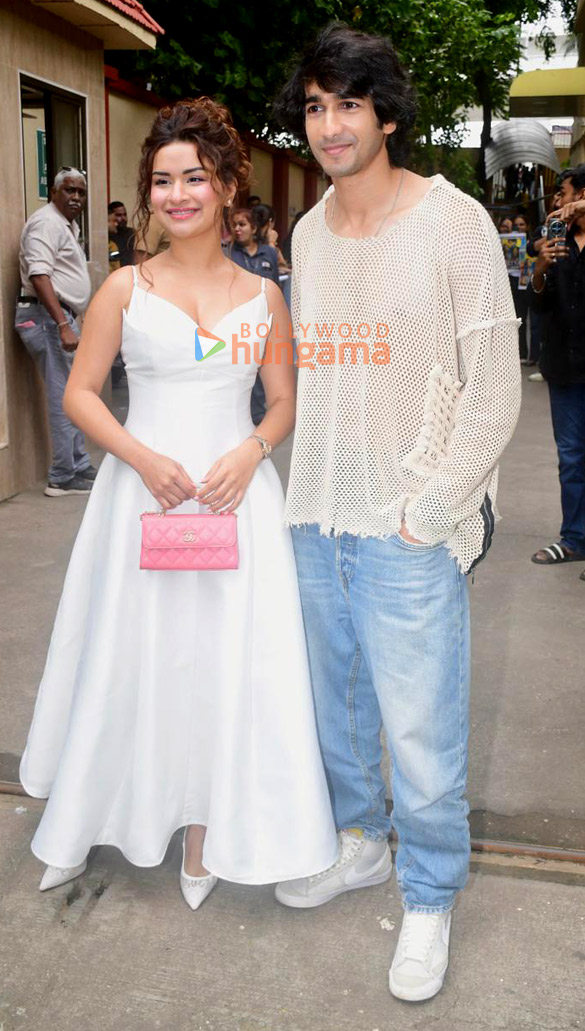
Kaur and Maheshwari spotted at Lala Lajpat Rai College

The film was announced at the 2024 Cannes Film Festival. It is based on the novel Madonna in a Fur Coat (1943), written by Sabahattin Ali. Shantanu Maheshwari, Avneet Kaur and Khả Ngân was cast to appear in the film. Principal photography of the film commenced in September 2024, and filming ended in December 2024. The filming took place in Vietnam and India.

== Music ==
Love In Vietnam

Soundtrack album by Amaal Mallik, Meet Bros, Rashid Khan and Aamir Ali
- Released: 2025
- Genre: Soundtrack
- Length: 30:13
- Language: Hindi
- Label: DRJ Records

The first single titled "Bade Din Huye" was released on 22 July 2025. The second single titled "Fakira" was released on 18 August 2025. The third single title "Burrah Burrah" was released on 1 September 2025.

Track listing
No.	Title	Lyrics	Music	Singer(s)	Length
1.	"Bade Din Huye"	Rashmi Virag	Amaal Mallik	Armaan Malik	5:53
2.	"Fakira"	Rahhat Shah Kazmi	Aamir Ali	Varun Jain	5:12
3.	"Burrah Burrah"	Kumaar	Meet Bros	Meet Bros, Malkit Singh, Ninja, Harshdeep Kaur	3:13
4.	"Jeena Nahi"	Rashmi Virag	Amaal Mallik	Armaan Malik	4:45
5.	"Chahe Jo Ho"	Rahhat Shah Kazmi	Aamir Ali	Jubin Nautiyal	3:53
6.	"Teri Pehli Nazar"	Kunaal Vermaa	Devv Sadaana	Raghav Chaitanya	3:35
7.	"No Matter What"				3:42
Total length:					30:13

== Direction Team ==
Director	Rahat Shah Kazmi
1st Assistant Director	Sathish Bhat
2nd Assistant Director	Ariba Sajid
3rd Assistant Director	Kirti Singh
4th Assistant Director	Angad Bali
5th Assistant Director	John Nhia

== Release ==
The official Poster of the film was released at the 77th Cannes Film Festival in May 2024 at the Bharat Pavilion. The film's poster was unveiled by the Ambassador of India to France, Mr. Jawed Ashraf, in the presence of producer Captain Rahul Bali, director Rahat Kazmi, and lead actors Shantanu Maheshwari and Avneet Kaur.

The trailer of the film was released on 25 August 2025. The film was cleared with a U/A certificate from the CBFC.

The film was premiered at the Da Nang Asian Film Festival, Vietnam on 1 July 2025.

== Reception ==
The film garnered widespread acclaim from renowned filmmakers, esteemed critics and leading media houses in India and around the world.

Hollywood's leading publication Variety praised the film and lauded its groundbreaking distribution deal in China.

Vietnam's longest-running newspaper, Lao Động, stated that the film lays the foundation for a promising cinematic collaboration between India and Vietnam.

Acclaimed filmmaker Imtiaz Ali praised the film for its freshness and making history by securing 10,000 screens in China even before releasing in India.

Varun Dhawan called it a "very sweet and endearing" film praising the lead actors Avneet Kaur and Shantanu Maheshwari and the beautiful locations showcased in the film.

Murtaza Ali Khan from The Sunday Guardian praised the film saying it "bridges cultures through cinematic romance and diplomacy".

The Times of India deemed Love in Vietnam a stand out for its soulful music, striking visuals, and a refreshing cast despite release clashes.

Business World in its review hailed Love In Vietnam as a tender, soulful film that dares to be quiet in the noisy world of Bollywood giving it a solid rating of 4.5/5.

Priyanka Gupta of DNA praised the film as a poignant and sincere romance, lauding its emotional depth and honest storytelling. She awarded it a 4 out of 5 rating.

== Awards and nominations ==
The film won 02 awards at the Seoul Global Movie Awards 2025 in South Korea winning Best Film of Asia and Best Director of Asia making it the first Indian film to win these top awards in Seoul, South Korea.

The lead actress of the film Avneet Kaur won the award for most Promising Performer (Female) at the Iconic Gold Awards 2026 for her role in Love in Vietnam.

The producer of the film Captain Rahul Bali was honoured with the prestigious Vietnam Airlines Excellence Award for his efforts in promoting Vietnam as a global destination through Love in Vietnam.
