= Cengiz Çandar =

Turkish politician, journalist, senior columnist (born 1948)

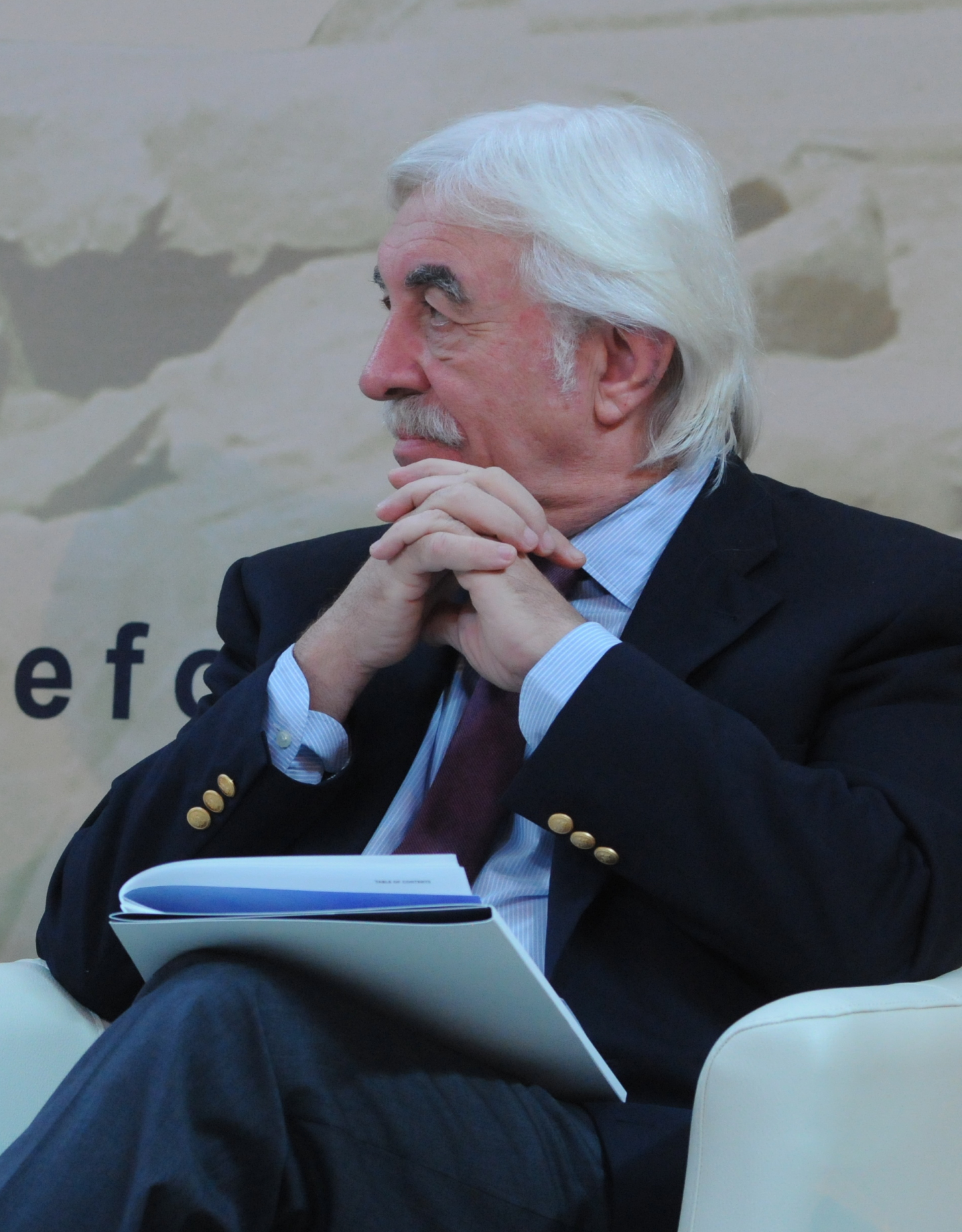
- Çandar at the Halifax International Security Forum in 2012

Member of the Grand National Assembly
- Incumbent
- Assumed office 2 June 2023
- Constituency: Diyarbakır (2023)

Personal details
- Born: 1948 (age 77–78) Ankara, Turkey
- Party: Peoples' Equality and Democracy Party
- Education: Talas American College; Tarsus American College
- Alma mater: Faculty of Political Science, Ankara University (BA)
- Occupation: Journalist; war correspondent; deputy

Cengiz Çandar (born 1948) is a Turkish politician, journalist, senior columnist, and a Middle East expert. He is elected to the Grand National Assembly of Turkey (TBMM) in May 2023, as Deputy of Diyarbakır from the pro-Kurdish Peoples’ Equality and Democracy Party (DEM Party). He is the second eldest serving member of the parliament. Member of EU Harmony Commission of the TBMM and Türkiye-EU Joint Parliamentary Assembly and Asian Parliamentarians Assembly representing the TBMM.

He is the author of Turkey's Neo-Ottomanist Moment: A Eurasianist Odyssey (Policy Series) (2021); Turkey's Mission Impossible: War and Peace with the Kurds (2020) and Mesopotamia Express: A Journey in History (Turkish: Mezopotamya Ekspresi: Bir Tarih Yolculuğu) (2012), which has been translated into various languages, including Sorani Kurdish and Arabic.

== Early life ==
Çandar finished the secondary school at Talas American College in Talas, Kayseri and the high school at Tarsus American College in Tarsus, Mersin. Çandar graduated from Ankara University in 1970 with a bachelor's degree in political science and international relations.

== Career ==
Çandar began his career as journalist in 1976 for the newspaper Vatan after living in the Middle East and Europe due to his opposition to the regime in Turkey following the military intervention in 1971. Being an expert on the Middle East (Lebanon and Palestine) and the Balkans (Bosnia and Herzegovina), Çandar worked for the Turkish News Agency and for the leading Turkish newspapers Cumhuriyet, Hürriyet, Sabah, Radikal, Referans and Güneş as a war correspondent. Currently, he is a columnist for Al-Monitor.

Çandar served as special adviser on foreign policy to Turkish president Turgut Özal between 1991 and 1993. He was the lead on the establishment of relationship between the Turkish Presidency and the Iraqi Kurdish leadership (1991) that led recognition of Jalal Talabani and Massoud Barzani in Turkey. He was also actively involved in Balkan politics, especially during the ethnic unrest in the Balkans between 1993 and 1995. In 1998, he was among the well-known journalists who have been subjected to an aggressive defamation campaign by the military. Between 1999 and 2000, he did research work on "Turkey of the 21st century" as a Public Policy Scholar at the Woodrow Wilson International Center for Scholars and a Senior Fellow at the United States Institute of Peace. He described the 1997 events in Turkey as a "post-modern coup". Çandar is one of the Turkish intellectuals who have recognized the Armenian genocide by releasing an apology for the "great catastrophe of 1915". The text of the apology was "My conscience does not accept the insensitivity showed to and the denial of the Great Catastrophe that the Ottoman Armenians were subjected to in 1915. I reject this injustice and for my share, I empathize with the feelings and pain of my Armenian brothers and sisters. I apologize to them." In 2007, he condemned the authorities for depriving Aghtamar of its Armenian past by renaming it to "Akdamar".

His report "Leaving the Mountain': How May the PKK Lay Down Arms?" was commissioned by the Turkish Economic and Social Studies Foundation (TESEV) (published in Turkish in 2011 and in English in 2012) analyses what type of a political infrastructure is needed to ultimately resolve the 'Kurdish question'.

From 2016, he moved to Stockholm, Sweden as Distinguished Visiting Scholar at the Stockholm University Institute for Turkish Studies (SUITS) and Senior Associate Fellow at the Swedish Institute of International Affairs (UI).

His books written in Stockholm and Berlin, Turkey's Mission Impossible: War and Peace with the Kurds and Turkey's Neo-Ottomanist Moment: A Eurasianist Odyssey are published in the United States in 2020 and in London in 2021 respectively.

He has taught at Istanbul Bilgi University (1997–1999), Istanbul Kültür University (2002–2010), Özyeğin University (2011). He is a frequent commentator on Turkey, Kurdish issue and Middle East affairs in international newspapers and on TV and lectures globally at universities including at Harvard University, Boston University and University of Oxford.

== Personal life ==
Çandar is married to writer Tuba Çandar, and they have one daughter. A lifelong Fenerbahçe fan, he was a football commentator on Fenerbahçe TV 2005–2015.

== Bibliography ==
The English translations of these titles are not the official titles.

- Direnen Filistin (The Palestine that Resists) (1976)
- Dünden Yarına İran (Iran: From Yesterday to Tomorrow) (1981)
- Ortadoğu Çıkmazı (The Middle East Impassé) (1983)
- Tarihle Randevu (Rendezvous with History) (1983)
- Güneşin Yedi Rengi (The Seven Colours of the Sun) (1987)
- Benim Şehirlerim (My Cities) (1999)
- Çıktık Açık Alınla (2001)
- Leaving the Mountain': How May the PKK Lay Down Arms? (2011)
- Mezopotamya Ekspresi: Bir Tarih Yolculugu (Mesopotamia Express- A Journey in History), İletişim Publications (2012)
- Turkey’s Mission Impossible: War and Peace with the Kurds Lexington Books (2020)
- Turkey’s Neo-Ottomanist Moment: A Eurasian Odyssey London Transnational Press (2021)
