= A Mind at Peace =

1949 novel by Ahmet Hamdi Tanpınar

- A Mind at Peace, English Edition Cover
- Author: Ahmet Hamdi Tanpınar
- Original title: Huzur
- Genres: novel
- Set in: Istanbul, Turkey
- Publisher: Archipelago Books
- Publication date: 1949

A Mind at Peace (Original title: Huzur) is a novel by Turkish writer Ahmet Hamdi Tanpınar from 1949. The novel is set in post-revolutionary Istanbul, shortly before the outbreak of World War II, and depicts the story of a failed relationship between a young historian and an older, recently divorced woman from Istanbul's upper class. It also addresses questions of national identity during the transition from the Ottoman Empire to the Turkish Republic. Orhan Pamuk described the novel in his memoirs as one of the most significant novels about Istanbul. The English translation by Erdağ M. Göknar was published in 2009 by Archipelago Books.

== Plot ==
The novel portrays a critical period in the lives of four main characters in Istanbul shortly before the outbreak of World War II: Mümtaz, a twenty-seven-year-old assistant at the literature faculty; İhsan, his older cousin and mentor; Nuran, his freshly divorced lover; and Suat, a mutual acquaintance of the couple who, due to his physical and mental suffering, struggles with himself and the world and tries to thwart the relationship between Mümtaz and Nuran. The novel is divided into four parts, each named after one of these characters.

First Part: İhsan

Since the death of his parents, Mümtaz has been living with his cousin İhsan, who has warmly welcomed him into his family and acts as a fatherly friend and mentor to him, but is currently seriously ill. Filled with concern for his sick cousin and additionally suffering from heartache, Mümtaz wanders aimlessly through Istanbul, indulging in painful memories of happy days with his former lover and his traumatic childhood, marked by the violent death of his father, who was shot by soldiers, and the soon-following death of his mother.

Second Part: Nuran

At the center is the romance between Mümtaz and Nuran, who has just separated from her husband Fâhir Bey after he cheated on her with another woman. Nuran flourishes in her relationship with Mümtaz but feels torn between the new love and her maternal duties: Her daughter Fatma does not like Mümtaz and opposes a second marriage for her mother. Despite these obstacles, the new lovers dream of a future together and make plans for living together. However, Nuran must observe a legal waiting period before she can marry again.

Third Part: Suat

Mümtaz and Nuran move in intellectual circles. At dinner gatherings, they listen to the sounds of traditional Turkish music and discuss poetry and culture, as well as the difficulties of finding identity between East and West, tradition and progress, individualism and community spirit. Nuran finds an apartment in the city for the winter and furnishes it. Nevertheless, Mümtaz is increasingly plagued by fears of loss. His fears are intensified by encounters with Suat, a former fellow student and former admirer of Nuran, who now wants to win Nuran back by all means. Suat is seriously ill, deeply unhappy in his marriage, morally unstable, and weary of life. When he accidentally finds the key to Nuran's apartment, which she had previously lost, he uses this opportunity for a final act of destruction – he enters the apartment and hangs himself there. This has the desired effect on Nuran: she can no longer imagine a happy life with Mümtaz in these rooms – she sees Suat's suicide as a sign of fate and breaks off the engagement.

Fourth Part: Mümtaz

İhsan's condition worsens. Mümtaz sets out in the night to get a doctor. On the way, he reflects on his failed relationship. Finally, he finds a military doctor with whom he discusses both the condition of the patient and the tense political situation. At dawn, Mümtaz is sent out again to get medicine. This time, Suat appears to him as a ghost. While fleeing from the apparition, Mümtaz breaks the medications, which by now have become unnecessary. İhsan, as the military doctor informs him, now "needs nothing at all." From the radio, Mümtaz hears that World War II has broken out.

== Themes ==
The original title of the novel is Huzur. This Ottoman loanword from Arabic describes a mentality typical especially of upper-class representatives in the late phase of the Ottoman Empire, a lifestyle characterized, in the tradition of mysticism, by ataraxia, a striving for peace of mind, inner calm, and distance from life's impulses. As a title for this novel, the term is not without irony, as the captured mood is rather somber, never completely free from doubts and dark forebodings even in moments of fulfilled love. Interpersonal entanglements and private problems are at the center of the novel and give little cause for the pathos of superficial human happiness and liberation. The main character Mümtaz yearns in vain for this titular peace of mind. Instead, the novel depicts unrest and extreme emotions – love, reverence for life, enjoyment of the world, but also deep despair and pure malice.

Another central concept for understanding the work is Huzun, a special form of melancholy typical of Istanbul. The Turkish writer Orhan Pamuk has popularized this particularly paralyzing, fatalistic, specifically Turkish melancholy, which arises when wandering through Istanbul's narrow, winding side streets, among Western readers and cites Tanpınar's novel as a characteristic example in his memoirs. Both Mümtaz and Nuran feel that their romance is born under an unlucky star from the beginning and think of the inevitable heartache even in the moment of the highest romantic fulfillment. Resigned to their inescapable fate, the couple explores the decaying city long past its glory days, as if Tanpınar wanted to catalog its past for his readers and reclaim it through the depiction of these walks.

The novel also serves as a literary monument to a city. At the time of the action, Istanbul is in a particularly critical phase of its history, shortly after the collapse of the Ottoman Empire, at the transition to a Turkish state modeled after European examples. The city suffers from the aftermath of World War I and increasing poverty. Entire population groups were driven out of the once cosmopolitan city. The status as a great power was lost, and the new Turkish state exerts pressure to banish all memory of the Ottoman past. This required the development of a new national identity, which proves to be a difficult project; Kemal Atatürk's efforts to modernize traditional Ottoman culture through Western influences do not proceed smoothly.

These tensions between East and West also become visible in the relationship between Mümtaz, the young intellectual who raves about Baudelaire and likes to lose himself in abstract considerations, and Nuran, a somewhat older, divorced woman from a respected family. Nuran's ancestors were masters of traditional Turkish music, an art form that renounces originality and instead emphasizes repetition and religious devotion. Nuran herself is a talented singer of traditional songs. The depiction of a musical evening in which both participate ultimately drives the contrast between East and West to the extreme. When Nuran joins in the song while Mümtaz observes her, the increasing emotional distance between the two becomes apparent.

== Form ==
A Mind at Peace is a modern novel that leaves behind traditional forms of storytelling. Instead of presenting the events in a linear chronology, Tanpınar relies on a narrative method that tells retrospective, present, and indirectly also the future together. Accordingly, time and different perceptions of time play a decisive role in this novel. Time appears in it both as a mystical continuum and as a hectic sequence of historical events. Here, the influence of Henri Bergson, whose writings greatly impressed Tanpınar, becomes visible. Tanpınar adopts from him a concept of time that understands time once as time (temps) in the conventional sense, and once as duration (durée). Time passes, duration is fulfilled. Common to both is the moment, which can be understood as a flowing transition in the sequence of events but also as a punctual place in the stream of time.

== Position in Literary History ==
A Mind at Peace has been compared to the novel Ulysses by James Joyce. Both novels are about a young protagonist who explores his own inner life while exploring the city. In both novels, there are depictions of coffee house conversations of underemployed intellectuals in a country on the edge of Europe, and in both novels, interior monologues are used. Ultimately, however, these similarities remain rather superficial. The works of the Greek-Alexandrian poet Constantine Cavafy are mentioned as a more fitting comparison.

With his tendency towards melancholy and aestheticism, Tanpınar did not correspond to the zeitgeist with this novel. At the time of publication, social-realistic-Marxist tendencies dominated. Tanpınar's melancholy did not fit with the prevailing poetics of human happiness and the demand for patriotic optimism. His fascination with the past, his insistence on remembering, was seen as a reactionary attitude in 1940. While convinced Kemalists sought a solution in the imitation of the West in their struggle for a new, progressive national identity, Tanpınar found pride and hope for regeneration in a Turkish way of life as it was already practiced. However, he did seek, in agreement with the Kemalists, a specifically Turkish Istanbul that remained from the once cosmopolitan metropolis after the expulsion of Armenians and Greeks from Istanbul. As a nationalist who was nevertheless influenced by Western writers, Tanpınar strove for a middle path between Turkey and Europe.

== Reception ==
Literary critics such as Şükran Kurdakul initially found little praise for Tanpınar's prose works. Only later did a reassessment of Tanpınar as a significant Turkish novelist take place. His novel A Mind at Peace is now considered by many as a masterpiece of Turkish novel art in the 20th century.

The Austin Chronicle confirms the undeniable historical importance of the novel and praises the exciting initial situation, but also criticizes the lack of focus in the narrative and the lofty prose that sometimes makes reading it exhausting. The Frankfurter Allgemeine Zeitung strikes the same chord: the novel is assigned a singular rank in Turkish literature of the twentieth century; however, the critic here too is alienated by the high tone and the spiritualized ardor of some passages.

Orhan Pamuk, who counts Tanpınar among his most important role models, values A Mind at Peace as "the most significant novel ever written about Istanbul."

On Deutschlandfunk, it is stated that the novel falls into two parts: a beautiful, failing love story, interspersed with occasional fundamental discussions about Turkish identity. Nevertheless, Pamuk's judgment that it is one of the most significant Istanbul novels is shared here as well.
