= Marko Paşa =

Turkish political satire magazine (1946–1950)

- Categories: Satirical magazine; Political magazine
- Frequency: Weekly
- Founder: Aziz Nesin; Sabahattin Ali; Rıfat Ilgaz
- Founded: 1946
- First issue: 25 November 1946
- Final issue: 1950
- Country: Turkey
- Based in: Istanbul
- Language: Turkish

Marko Paşa (literally Marco Pasha) was a weekly political satire magazine which was in circulation between 1946 and 1950. The magazine was based in Istanbul, Turkey, and subtitled, Political Satire Periodical for the People. It is one of the earliest publications in the country which employed cartoons for class struggle.

== History and profile ==
Marko Paşa was established in 1946 by leading Turkish journalists and authors, namely Aziz Nesin, Sabahattin Ali and Rıfat Ilgaz. Of them Sabahattin Ali was also the owner of Marko Paşa which was financed by the members of the Socialist Party. The founding editor-in-chief of the weekly was Sabahattin Ali who held the post until 1948. The first issue appeared on 25 November 1946, and the magazine was consisted of four pages with 26x41cm size.

The magazine was published on a weekly basis and had a socialist political stance featuring political satire. It was one of the opposition media outlets to the ruling party, Republican People's Party. The magazine was also one of the critics of the United States. Several issues of the magazine was banned, and the editors were often sued because of their drawings and writings. In order to reflect this pressure the cover of the magazine occasionally contained statements like "published when not censored" and "published when writers not in custody". All such tensions between the editors of the magazine and single party government are one of the reasons for the mysterious murder of Sabahattin Ali in 1948.

Marko Paşa's first issue sold just 6,000 copies. The circulation raised to 70,000 copies by the sixth issue.

Marko Paşa could survive until 1950 when it was closed down by the court orders, and Aziz Nesin was imprisoned due to his writings in the magazine which criticized the American aid to Turkey.

== Legacy ==
The issues of Marko Paşa were archived under the Chicago Ottoman Microfilms Project initiated by the University of Chicago in 1985.
