= Fatma Nudiye Yalçı =

Turkish writer, translator and politician

- Born: Fatma Nudiye Hüseyin; 1904; Istanbul, Ottoman Empire
- Died: 1969 (aged 64–65); Varna, Bulgaria
- Education: Philosophy
- Alma mater: Istanbul University
- Occupations: Writer, translator, politician
- Writing career
- Pen name: "Nudiye Hüseyin", "Nudiye Nizamettin"

Fatma Nudiye Yalçı (born Nudiye Hüseyin 1904–1969) was a Turkish writer, translator and leftist party politician.

== Early life ==
Fatma Nudiye was born in Istanbul, then the capital of the Ottoman Empire in 1904. Her father was Hüseyin Hüsnü, a lieutenant commander serving as engine officer in the Ottoman Navy.

She was educated in philosophy at Istanbul University. After graduation, she met intelligentsia gathered around the magazine Resimli Ay (literally "Illustrated Month") published by Sabiha and Zekeriya Sertel.

== Writer and translator ==
In March 1932, she married journalist and writer Nizamettin Nazif (later Tepedelenlioğlu). From 1933 on, she wrote columns under the pen name "Nudiye Hüseyin" for the weekly Yedigün (literally "Seven Days"). Under the pen name "Nudiye Nizamettin," she published the drama Beyoğlu 1931, which popularized her as the first Turkish woman playwright having authored a play included in the repertoire by theatre historians.

After she divorced her husband, she took a job as Turkish interpreter at the consulate of the Soviet Union in Beyoğlu, Istanbul. Following the Surname Law in 1934, her family took the surname "Yalçı".

Sometime between late 1933 and 1935, she met Turkish communist leader Hikmet Kıvılcımlı. From then on, they became comrade and partner, a personal and ideological relationship that lasted until the end of their life. Together with Kıvılcımlı, she was engaged in publishing and translation in the "Bibliotheca Marxism", "Laborer's Library" and "Kıvılcımlı's Library". She translated the books Address of the International Workingmen's Association's Opening by Karl Marx, Principles of Communism by Friedrich Engels, and published later the children's book Güneşin Çocuğu Gölgenin Çocuğu ("Child of the Sun, Child of the Shadow").

== Politician ==
She was arrested following the 1938 Navy Trial ("Donanma Davası"), along with poet Nazım Hikmet, Hikmet Kıvılcımlı, novelist Kemal Tahir and Abdülkerim Korcan. After serving ten years in Sinop Fortress Prison, she was released in 1948. She was among the founders of the left-wing nationalist political party Patriotic Party (Vatan Partisi) in 1954, and chaired its Honor Board. In the Patriotic Party Trial, she was arrested on 30 December 1957, and was imprisoned until 7 October 1959.

== Emigration and death ==
In 1965, she was diagnosed with goitrous problems. On 27 November 1967, she departed from Sirkeci railway station to Bulgaria. She wanted to be treated in Romania, however, the journey went to Leipzig in East Germany. She returned to Sofia, Bulgaria. After she completed her retirement process, she moved to Varna, Bulgaria. By July 1969, she died in Varna. Her personal belongings were later sent to her nephew Beklan Algan.

== Legacy ==
Bilgesu Erenus wrote Yalçı's life history in a book titled Yaftalı Tabut (literally "Labeled Coffin", where label indicates the document containing personal and criminal information which is attached to a person sentenced to death during the execution). In 2018, the book was adapted as a play to be staged for International Women's Day.

== Bibliography ==
- Sosyete ve Teknik (1935) Marksizm Bibliyoteği
- Enternasyonal İşçiler Cemiyeti Açış Hitabesi by Karl Marx (1935) Marksizm Bibliyoteği (translation)
- Komünizmin Prensipleri by Friedrich Engels (1935) Marksizm Bibliyoteği (translation)
- Güneşin Çocuğu Gölgenin Çocuğu (1936) Emekçi Kütüphanesi
