= Orhan Kemal Cengiz =

Turkish lawyer, writer and human rights activist

Orhan Kemal Cengiz is a Turkish lawyer, journalist, novelist, and human rights activist.

He earned his law degree from the University of Ankara in 1993. In 1996, he was appointed director of the Human Rights Center at the İzmir Bar Association. From 1997 to 1998, he practiced human rights law in London. Cengiz founded the Human Rights Agenda Association and served as its president from 2003 to 2012. He is also a member of the advisory board of the Freedom Research Association.

Cengiz was a regular columnist for the now-defunct newspapers Today's Zaman and Radikal. He has also written commentary for Al-Monitor, focusing on issues such as judicial independence, political repression, human rights abuses, and minority protections in Turkey. In 2008, he received threats to his life due to his involvement in the high-profile Malatya Bible murder case; he asked for and eventually received a bodyguard. His request was supported by Amnesty International.

Cengiz is also a novelist and essayist who has written works including Umut Ağacı (The Tree of Hope), Gölgenin Şarkısı (The Song of the Shadow), and En İyi Oyuncu (The Best Actor).
