= Filiz Ali =

Turkish pianist and musicologist (born 1937)

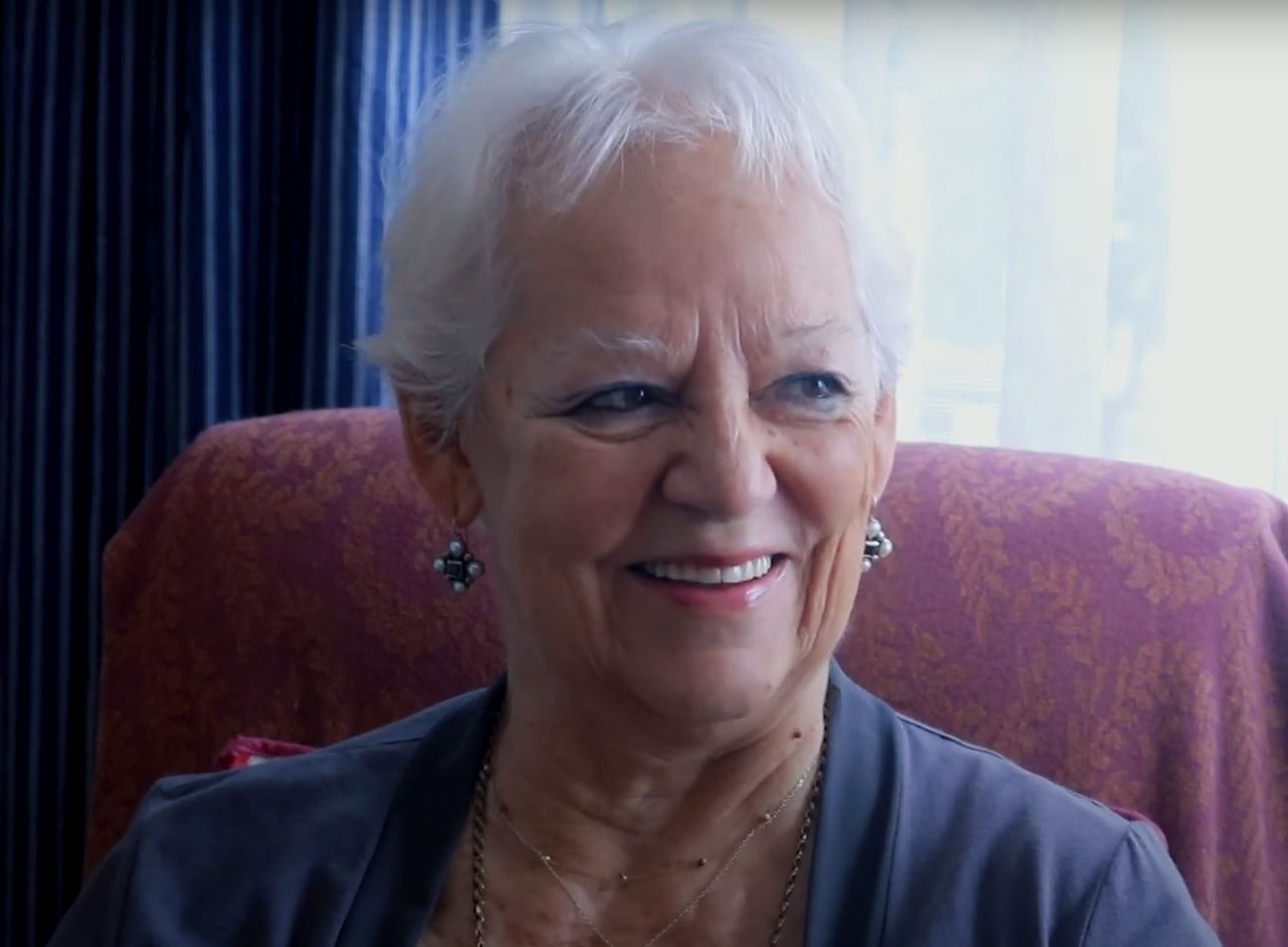

Background information
- Born: 30 September 1937 (age 88); Istanbul, Turkey
- Occupation(s): Musicologist and pianist
- Instrument: Piano
- Years active: 1962–present
- Website: filizali.blogspot.com

Filiz Ali (born 30 September 1937) is a Turkish pianist, musicologist, music critic and writer. She is the daughter of one of the greatest authors of Turkish literature Sabahattin Ali (1907–1948).

She studied piano at the State Conservatory of Music in Ankara. Graduating from Ferhunde Erkin's class in 1958, she received a Fulbright scholarship to study in the United States. Ali completed her studies at the New England Conservatory of Music in Boston, MA, where she studied with David Barnett, she also studied at the Mannes College of Music in New York City with Frank Sheridan. In 1986 she received a master’s degree in Advanced Musical Studies from King's College London where she was a Chevening Scholar.

Filiz Ali served as piano and accompaniment teacher at the Ankara State Conservatory (1962-65), accompanist at the Istanbul State Opera (1965-72), and piano and accompaniment teacher at the Mimar Sinan University State Conservatory (1972- 85). She became a teacher in the Mimar Sinan University musicology department in 1987 and held the position of Musicology Department Chair between the years 1990 and 2005. She later taught at Sabancı University.

Filiz Ali was the founding artistic director of the CRR Concert Hall in Istanbul between 1989 - 1992. She has been the musical advisor of the International Eskişehir Festival since 1995. Ali is also founder and director of Ayvalık International Music Academy (AIMA) since 1998. The aim of this academy is providing master classes for conservatory level students from Turkey and abroad, giving talented young people the chance to work with renowned leading musicians from Europe and Turkey. She produced music programmes including World Folk Songs, Piano Literature, Vocal Music and Jazz Today for the Turkish Radio and Television Corporation from 1962 to 1995 and for the London based BBC Turkish in 1985-86. She has been the regular music critique for major daily newspapers including Cumhuriyet, Hürriyet, Yeni Yüzyıl, Milliyet, Radikal and in magazines, including the Gösteri, Marie-Claire, Vizyon, YK Kitaplık, and Müzikoloji. Between the years 2002 and 2004, she produced and hosted music programmes on Açık Radyo.

She is a founder of Balkan Music Forum and was Turkish representative of the UNESCO International Music Council in Montevideo, Uruguay in October 2003. She has been the representative for Turkey in the European Music Council since 2005.

She is the author of several books on music and musicians.

== Awards ==
- Chevalier de L'Ordre des Arts et des Lettres Medal (1995) – France Culture Ministry)
- Vehbi Koç Foundation Award (2011)
- 43. Istanbul Music Festival Honorary Award (2015) (in appreciation of her work on polyphonic Western music)

== Publications ==
- Sabahattin Ali (1979)
- Music and the Problems of Our Music (1987)
- Musician Portraits from the World and Turkey (1994)
- Filiz Should Never Grieve… (1995)
- A Present to Cemal Reşit Rey (1996)
- Ferhunde Erkin / Amongst the Keys (2000)
- Bülent Arel, a Pioneer of Electronic Music (2002)
- A Modern Centre for Music in the Land of Myths: A Masterclass Story from Ayvalık (2008)
- Musical Journeys (2012)
- Nothing, it didn't hurt... (2017)
