= Fethiye Çetin =

Turkish lawyer (born 1950)

Fethiye Çetin (Turkish pronunciation: [ˈfethiːje ˈtʃetin]) (born 4 May 1950 in Maden, Elazığ Province) is a Turkish lawyer, writer and human rights activist of Armenian origin.

== Biography ==
Growing up in Maden, Fethiye Çetin had no reason to suspect that she had other than Turkish Muslim roots, until her maternal grandmother, Seher, revealed to her that her real name was not Seher: she was by birth an Armenian Christian, named Heranuş Gadaryan. Heranuş was born to parents Hovannes and Isguhi Gadaryan, and was taken from her mother's arms during a death march in the course of the Armenian genocide.

This legacy inspired Çetin's first book, a memoir published in 2004 about her grandmother's story entitled My Grandmother: An Armenian Turkish Memoir. The memoir follows Heranuş through the eyes of her granddaughter, from memories of Çetin's childhood, to the horrendous events of the Armenian genocide her grandmother revealed to her as an adult. Çetin discovered that all the men of Heranuş' village had been slaughtered in 1915, and the women and children were forced into exile, walking for many miles with Turkish soldiers more than willing to pick off any stragglers. During this long march, Heranuş was taken out of her mother's arms and adopted by a Turkish gendarme. It was from this adoption that Çetin's grandmother adopted the identity of Seher, the content, Muslim housewife that raised Çetin. Her grandmother's experiences launched a search for Heranuş' family, who had escaped to New York. My Grandmother explores the bond formed between grandmother and granddaughter from the time of the revelation until Heranuş' death. The Independent describes the book as "Gripping and thought-provoking ... Spare and elegant ... This moving testimony transcend politics and brings the Armenian tragedy to life with tenderness as well as sadness".

My Grandmother, translated into English by Maureen Freely, has become demanded reading piece at some progressive Turkish institutes of higher education, such as Sabancı University. Hugh Pope, reviewing the book for Today's Zaman, characterises the book as "part of a trend in Turkey that is grappling with a history of denial, nationalism and fears of political consequences" in regards to "the lost Armenians".

As a lawyer, Çetin has been representing the family of the murdered Turkish-Armenian newspaper editor Hrant Dink.

In September 2010, Fethiye Çetin visited Australia as an invited guest to a public discussion in a Sydney bookstore, about her memoir My Grandmother. She also went to Melbourne as an invited guest to the Melbourne Writers' Festival.
