= Bilgesu Erenus =

Turkish playwright (1943–2026)

- Born: 13 August 1943; Gölpazarı, Bilecik Province, Turkey
- Died: c. 5 August 2026 (aged 82)
- Spouse: Müştak Erenus (m. 1967; div. 1990)

Bilgesu Erenus (13 August 1943 – c. 5 August 2026) was a Turkish playwright, screenwriter and activist. She began her career at the Turkish Radio and Television Corporation, working as a producer and scriptwriter before switching to playwriting in 1973 when her play El Kapısı was staged at the Ankara Art Theatre. Her earlier plays focused on contemporary issues in Turkey, and included İkili Oyun (1975), Kaside (1979 or 1981), and Güneyli Bayan (1984). Plays she wrote in the 21st century included Çağrı (2004), which dealt with the Dersim massacre, and Yaftalı Tabut (2017), about the life of Turkish playwright Fatma Nudiye Yalçı.

Erenus was also politically active; she was the owner of the government-critical monthly Toplumsal Kurtuluş and arrested or detained on multiple occasions in connection with her activism.

== Early life and education ==
Bilgesu Erenus was born in Gölpazarı, Bilecik, Turkey on 13 August 1943, to parents Avni and Aliye Duru. She attended the Kadıköy High School for Girls, before going on to study music at the Istanbul University State Conservatory and in the journalism department of Istanbul University. She graduated from the university with a Bachelor of Arts degree.

== Career ==
In 1965, Erenus began her career as a scriptwriter and producer on radio shows at the Turkish Radio and Television Corporation. She worked there until 1973, when her first play, El Kapısı, was produced at the Ankara Art Theatre. She followed that with the plays Ortak (1975), Nereye Payidar (1976), and İkili Oyun (1977), and also won first prize at the 1976 World Children's Year Play competition. Her İkili Oyun (transl. Twosome Play) ran in Istanbul from 1977 to 1978; dealing with political themes, it featured two characters, a man and a wife, who go camping alongside a puppet representing various vices. Later that year, Erenus received the "Best Living Playwright" in Turkey award. In 1979, she finished Kaside (published in 1979 or 1981), a satire about the last Shah of Iran, Mohammad Reza Pahlavi and his wife, Farah Pahlavi. It remained unproduced as of the mid-1980s. In 1984, her play Güneyli Bayan was well received by the public; it depicted the life of American dramatist Lillian Hellman.

In 2004, Erenus's play Çağrı was published; taking the form of a Cem worship ceremony, the play advocates for the preservation of Dersim Kurd culture and deals with the 1937–1938 Dersim massacre, criticising the Turkish state and those in the Turkish government responsible for the events at Dersim. The play centres women through its main character, Keçi Kadın (Goat Woman), who leads the Cem ceremony and gives birth to the idea of "Dersim 1938". Though the play is written in Turkish, it is presented to the audience as though it were meant to be in the Zaza language.

The play Yaftalı Tabut (2017) depicted a dramatized account of Turkish female playwright Fatma Nudiye Yalçı's life. First performed in Istanbul in 2021, the play starts and ends at Yalçı's funeral. Seven "Fatma" characters each represent a portion of her life, from childhood to adulthood, and "directly addresses the official forgetting or obscuration" of her life in the Turkish historical record.

Erenus was on the board of the Turkish Writers' Union from 1977 to 1979.

== Activism and arrests ==
Erenus's earliest plays dealt with issues in contemporary Turkey, including women's rights and rural Turkish people moving to larger cities or away from the country. She continued to engage in activism during the period between the 1980 Turkish coup d'état to 1983 elections, ultimately being arrested by military courts and held in solitary confinement. In 1984, she was one of the intellectuals, led by Aziz Nesin, who signed the Petition of Intellectuals delivered to Kenan Evren and the Turkish government. After speaking against the military draft in the 1990s, she was arrested and sentenced to a year in prison by a military court.

She was the owner of the political journal Toplumsal Kurtuluş. First published in 1987, it contained material critical of the Turkish government. In 1988, she, her husband, and their son were detained by the police, alongside other people involved in the journal's publication. Erenus was detained again later that year after participating in a panel.

== Personal life and death ==
Erenus married Müştak Erenus in 1967; the couple divorced in 1990. She died in August 2026, at the age of 82. (Note: Many sources mislabel her age as "83".)

== Bibliography ==
Plays written by Erenus have been translated into French and German.

- El Kapısı (Slaving for Foreigners, 1972)
- Ortak (The Partner, 1975)
- Nereye Payidar (Where to, Payidar?, 1976)
- İkili Oyun (Twosome Play, 1977)
- Kaside (Qasidah, 1979 or 1981)
- Güneyli Bayan (Southern Lady, 1984)
- İnsan Aklını Koruma Enstitüsü (1994)
- Dokumacılar (1994)
- Kırmızı Karaağaç (1996)
- Gece (1996)
- Göz (1997)
- Kazı (1997)
- Halide (2000)
- Aydınlık Zindan (2002)
- Böyle Bir Dünya (2002)
- Çağrı (2004)
- Misafir (2004)
- Samur Kürk Uzayan Yolculuk (2004)
- Yaftalı Tabut (The Stigmatised Coffin, 2017)
- Aydınlıkevler

=== Screenplays ===
- Bir Tren Yolculuğu (1988)
- İkili Oyunlar (1989)
- Devlerin Ölümü (1990)
