= Institut du Bosphore =

Think-tank of high-level Turkish and French personalities

The Institut du Bosphore is a think-tank of high-level Turkish and French personalities from various backgrounds including politicians, businessmen, economists, experts, and intellectuals. The stated mission of the Institut du Bosphore is to bolster free and objective links between France and Turkey.

The Institut du Bosphore debates topics such as global politics, economy, social, and cultural issues with a view to highlighting Turkey's involvement in global society and in particular its close ties with the European Union and France. It facilitates common reflection of French and Turkish people on Europe and current global issues.

Bahadır Kaleağası is the President of the Institut du Bosphore.
