= Sinop Fortress Prison =

Inescapable old prison complex in Turkey

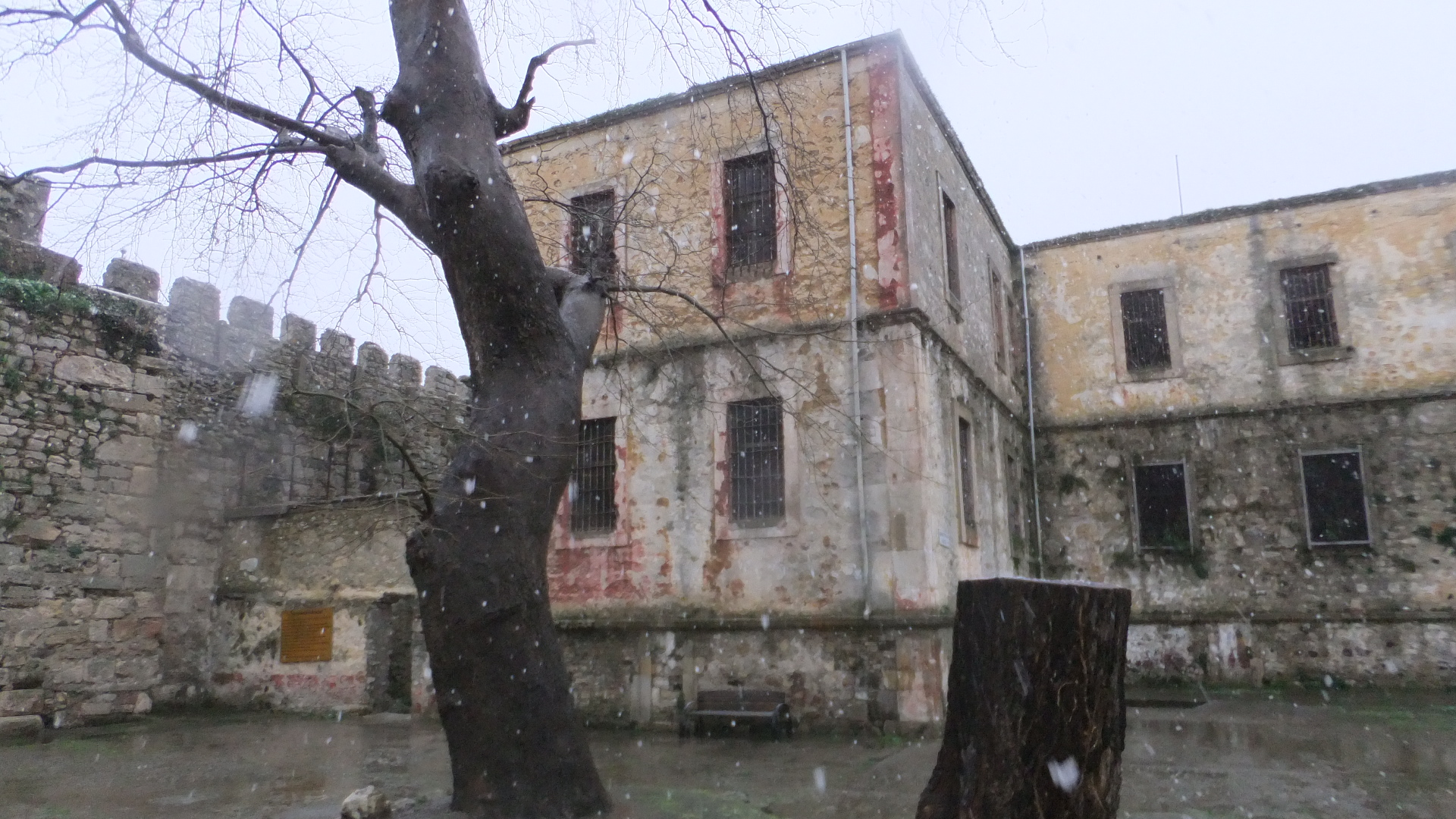
- Sinop Fortress Prison
- Interactive map of Sinop Fortress Prison
- Location: Sinop, Turkey; 42°01′28″N 35°08′35″E
- Status: Closed
- Opened: 1887
- Closed: December 6, 1997

Notable prisoners
- Devlet II Giray, Mustafa Suphi, Sabahattin Ali, Nazım Hikmet

Sinop Fortress Prison (Turkish: Sinop Kale Cezaevi) was a state prison situated in the inside of the Sinop Fortress in Sinop, Turkey. As one of the oldest prisons of Turkey, it was established in 1887 within the inner fortress of the centuries-old fortification located on the northwestern part of Cape Sinop. It is also known as "The Anatolian Alcatraz" because it was impossible for prisoners to escape due to location and high security measures. The prison was closed down in 1997 and the inmates were transferred to a modern prison newly built in Sinop.

== Sinop Fortress ==
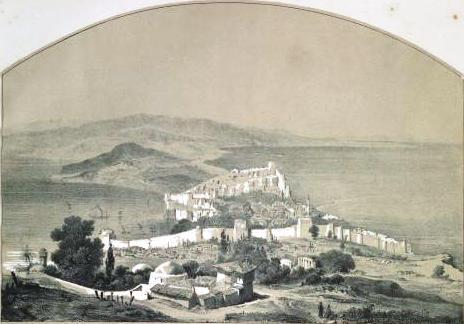
The Sinop Fortress in Sinop, Turkey

Located direct at the coast of Black Sea on the northwest part of Cape Sinop, the Sinop Fortress was constructed initially in the 7th century BC when the city was re-founded as a Greek colony from the city of Miletus. It was extended and repaired several times in its history by Persians, Kingdom of Pontus, Romans and Byzantines. The fortress took its main form during the reign of Pontus King Mithradates Eupator in 72 BC.

Following the capture of the city on October 3, 1214, Izz ad-Din Kaykaus II, sultan of Seljuk Turks of Rûm divided the fortress in two parts by erecting a wall in north–south direction. The inner fortress of today was formed by adding another wall in the west–east direction. Since then, the inner fortress was used also as shipyard and dungeon. The oldest document that shows the fortress was used as dungeon dates back to 1568.

The walls of the fortress are 18 m high and 3 m wide. There are eleven watchtowers of 22 m height, five of them added during the construction of the inner fortress.

== Fortress prison ==
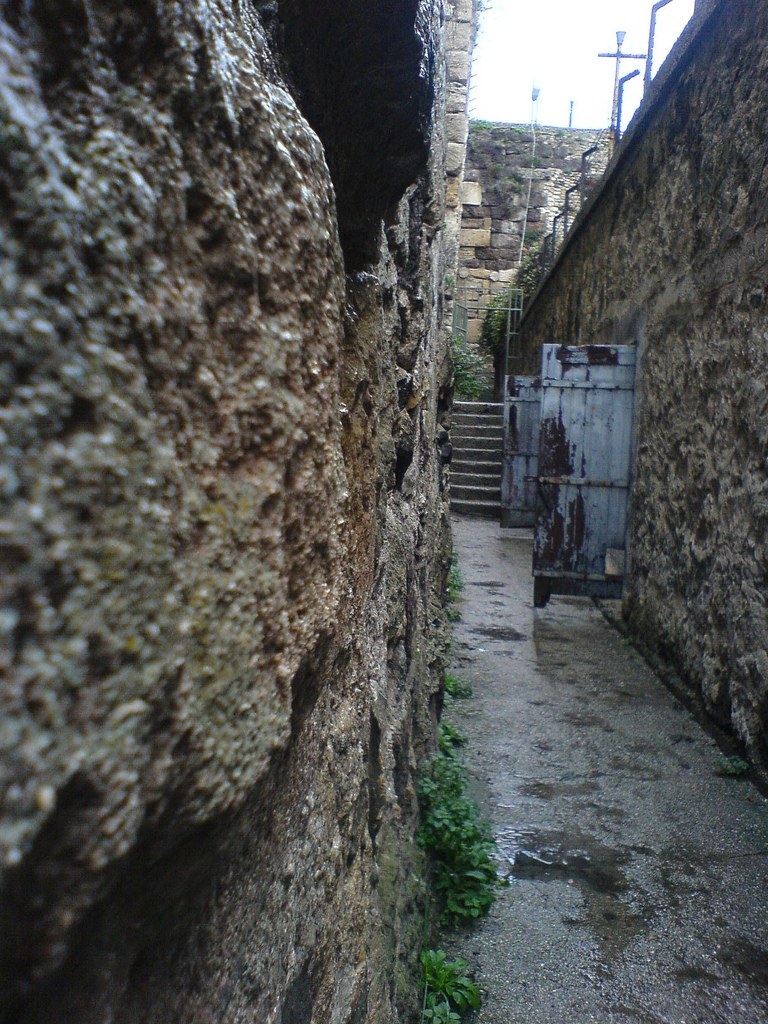
Sinop Fortress Prison exterior.

Designed in U-shape, a stonemasonry prison building with 28 halls on two floors was erected in 1887 in the inside of the southern inner fortress. For use by the prisoners, a hamam (bathhouse) with a single dome was built also next to the prison building. İn 1939, an extension building with 9 halls on two floors, architectural conform with the main building, was added for use as juvenile prison. The inner fortress holding the prison facilities covers an area of 10,247 m^{2}.

The prison was considered as a high-security penitentiary with no escape possibility due to its position within a fortress. The top of the walls of the inner fortress served to the patrolling prison guard as walkway. The living conditions at the prison, where it was difficult even to light a match, were very harsh due to the moisture caused by the location of the prison very close to the sea.

In the beginning of the 20th century, a rehabilitation program was set up for the prisoners. The inmates were given the opportunity to learn and practice handicraft such as woodworking and jewelry that enabled them to potter and to earn money from the items they produced and sold.

The fortress-prison was located at the narrowest point between Boztepe peninsula and the mainland Sinop. The Area between the Mainland and the Peninsula was 300 meters wide at most, which meant even if a prisoner was able to escape from prison, he would be easily encircled by the law enforcement in that area. The escapee would not be able to swim to the mainland either, because of the waves of the Black sea. Only way was to have a boat which would be most likely provided by the local population, but there has never been an official report about any type of collaboration between the people of Sinop and the prisoners.

The prison was abandoned on December 6, 1997, after the inmates were transferred to a newly built prison in Sinop.

== In popular culture ==
The Sinop Fortress Prison was featured in various stories and poems by notable Turkish writers, who served their sentence. Refik Halit Karay, Ahmet Bedevi Kuran, Refii Cevat Ulunay, Sabahattin Ali, Kerim Korcan and Zeyyat Selimoğlu are some of them to name.

Sabahattin Ali's poem Aldırma Gönül, written 1933 in the prison and featuring the prison life, was composed in 1977 by Kerem Güney, which became nowadays very popular song by Edip Akbayram.

The Turkish movie Pardon (2004), and the TV mini series Firar (Prison Break) (1993) and Köpek (The Dog) (2005) were shot in the historical prison.

Parmaklıklar Ardında (Behind Bars) (2007), adopted from the German RTL Television series Hinter Gittern – Der Frauenknast (1997–2007) and aired by the channel atv, is another Turkish TV mini series. The location in the series is the Sinop Fortress Prison. The generic music of the film is Aldırma Gönül sung by Kibariye.

== Tourist attraction ==
The prison facilities were handed over to the Culture and Tourism Ministry on August 2, 1999. The fortress prison is currently open to the public for sightseeing purposes. Originated from the increasingly presentation of the prison in the recent popular culture, there is a growing interest in visiting the site. The historical penitentiary hosts hundreds of thousands tourists yearly.

It is planned to convert the facilities in the inner fortress into a cultural complex with a maritime and a justice museum.

== Notable inmates ==
The prison hosted also many intellectuals, who were charged for political reasons.

- Devlet II Giray, Crimean Khan (1713)
- Refik Halit Karay, journalist and novelist (1913)
- Mustafa Suphi, journalist and communist politician (1913)
- Ahmet Bedevi Kuran, politician (1913)
- Refii Cevat Ulunay, journalist (1914)
- Hüseyin Hilmi, socialist politician
- Burhan Felek, journalist
- Osman Cemal Kaygılı, teacher and writer (1913)
- Zekeriya Sertel, journalist (1925–1928)
- Sabahattin Ali, writer, poet and journalist (1932)
- Kerim Korcan, novelist
- Osman Deniz, army officer
- Nazım Hikmet, poet
- Fatma Nudiye Yalçı, writer and politician
