= Tezer Özlü =

Turkish writer (1943-1986)

Tezer Özlü (10 September 1943 – 18 February 1986) was a Turkish writer.

== Biography ==
She was born in Simav and spent her childhood there and in Ödemiş and Gerede, where her parents worked. She moved to Istanbul when she was 10 years old and attended the Austrian Girls' High School (Avusturya Lisesi) without graduating. In 1961 she went abroad and then hitchhiked around Europe in 1962-1963. She married actor and writer Güner Sümer, whom she met in Paris, in 1964. Together they settled in Ankara. During this period when Sümer was working at the Ankara Arts Theatre (AST), Özlü worked as a German translator. In the 1963–64 season in AST, she played in Brendan Behan's Gizli Ordu (Secret Army), directed by Sümer.

Later, she left Sumer and settled in Istanbul, receiving intermittent treatment in the psychiatry clinics of different hospitals there between 1967 and 1972. She wrote about her childhood experiences and her experience of treatment in Çocukluğun Soğuk Geceleri (published in an English translation by Maureen Freely in 2023 as Cold Nights of Childhood).

In 1968 she married the director Erden Kıral and in 1973 their daughter Deniz was born. Having left Kıral, she went to Berlin in 1981 on a scholarship. She met Hans Peter Marti, a Swiss-born artist living in Canada, and married him in 1984, settling in Zürich. She died there on 18 February 1986 of breast cancer and is buried in Aşiyan Mezarlığı in Istanbul.

Özlü was portrayed by Yelda Reynaud in her ex-husband Erden Kıral's film Yolda, in which she describes events during the shooting of the movie Yol.

== Bibliography ==
Özlü's first book, published in 1978, was Eski Bahçe (Old Garden), a collection of her stories published in magazines since 1963. Her first novel, Çocukluğun Soğuk Geceleri (Cold Nights of Childhood), was published in 1980. Following in the footsteps of three writers who had a profound effect on her, Svevo, Kafka and Pavese she wrote her second novel Auf den Spuren eines Selbstmords (In Search of a Suicide) in German. The book, which won the 1982 Marburg Literary Award, was broadly rewritten by the author in Turkish as Yaşamın Ucuna Seyahat, published in 1984. The original German manuscript was posthumously published by Suhrkamp Verlag in 2024. Her first story book, Eski Bahçe, was republished in 1987 after her death with the name Eski Bahçe - Eski Sevgi (Old Garden - Old Love), to include the stories she had written later.

Özlü's unpublished screenplay, Zaman Dışı Yaşam, was also published in 1993 by Yapı Kredi Yayınları (YKY), which publishes all of the author's works. This series also includesTezer Özlü'den Leyla Erbil'e Mektuplar (Letters From Tezer Özlü to Leyla Erbil,1995), which consists of the letters that she wrote to her friend Leyla Erbil.[6] In addition, Özlü's book, Her Şeyin Sonundayım, consisting of her correspondence with her writer friend Ferit Edgü, was published in 2010 by SEL Yayıncılık. She translated Wolfgang Hildesheimer's work Mr. Walser's Crows into Turkish and adapted it for the radio.

Gergedan Magazine published a "photobiography" in her memory in its thirteenth issue. Some parts of her diary and narratives were brought together in a small booklet called The Remains (1990). Most of the German texts in this book were translated into Turkish by Sezer Duru.

- Eski Bahçe (Old Garden, 1978)
- Çocukluğun Soğuk Geceleri (1980) (translated in 2023 as Cold Nights of Childhood)
- Auf den Spuren eines Selbstmords (1983)
- Yaşamın Ucuna Yolculuk (1984)
- Eski Bahçe - Eski Sevgi (Old Garden - Old Love,1987)
- Kalanlar (Remains, 1995)
- Zaman Dışı Yaşam (2000).
