= Tuba Çandar =

Turkish journalist and author (born 1948)

- Born: 1948 (age 77–78)
- Education: Sankt Georgs-Kolleg; Faculty of Political Science, Ankara University (BA)
- Occupations: Journalist; author

Tuba Çandar (born 1948) is a Turkish journalist and author of biographies of three Turkish intellectuals. Her 700-page biography of the murdered Armenian journalist Hrant Dink's life "Hrant" (2010) is a best-seller in Turkey for which she interviewed 125 people.

== Early life ==
Born in 1948, Tuba Çandar attended the Sankt Georgs-Kolleg in Istanbul. She received an AFS Intercultural Programs scholarship and completed her studies in the United States. Çandar received her bachelor's degree in political science and international relations at the Ankara University in 1979.

== Publishing career ==
Çandar went to exile in Germany after the military coup of March 1971, and following the amnesty, she returned to Turkey where she became the editor-in-chief of Bizim Almanca magazine under the Turkish daily Cumhuriyet. She worked as an editor at Gergedan magazine and freelanced for various dailies including Yeni Yüzyıl, penning pieces on culture, arts and travel, and Gazete Pazar, where she started her "Portraits" column.

Her first book about the life of one of Turkey's first female architects Mualla Eyüboğlu Anhegger, Hitit Güneşi (Hitite Sun) was published in 2003. She released Murat Belge: Bir Hayat (Murat Belge: A Life) on the leftist Turkish intellectual and literary critic Murat Belge in 2007. Her book Hrant came out on the birthday of Hrant Dink on 15 September in 2010.

== Personal life ==
Çandar is married to journalist and columnist Cengiz Çandar, and they have one daughter.

== Bibliography ==
The English translations of these titles are not the official titles.

- Hitit Güneşi (Hitite Sun)
- Murat Belge / Bir Hayat...
- Hrant, available in 2016 in English
