= Taha Akyol =

Turkish journalist

Taha Akyol is a Turkish journalist and writer of Abkhazian descent. Akyol worked as a journalist at the Yankı news magazine, and the Tercüman, Meydan and Milliyet dailies. After the 1980s, he distanced himself from Turkish nationalism, turning toward conservative liberalism. While being a true classical liberal, both in political and economic terms, he takes a rightist-conservative approach to culture and foreign policy. Akyol is a member of the Board of Trustees at TOBB University of Economics and Technology. He is a producer at CNN Türk and was a columnist for the Hürriyet daily until its new, Erdogan-allied owners fired him in September 2018.

Akyol is married and a father of two. He is the father of Turkish journalist and writer Mustafa Akyol.

== Bibliography ==
- Atatürk'ün İhtilal Hukuku / 2012
- Demokrasiden Darbeye Babam Adnan Menderes / 2011
- Ortak Acı 1915 Türkler ve Ermeniler / 2009
- Ama Hangi Atatürk / Ocak 2008 / 3. baskı Mart 2008
- Medine'den Lozan'a / Kasım 2004
- Kitaplar Arasında / Haziran 2002 / 2. baskı Aralık 2005
- Hariciler ve Hizbullah, İslam Toplumlarında Terörün Kökleri / Mart 2000 / 3. baskı Nisan 2000
- Mezhep ve Devlet, Osmanlı'da ve İran'da / Ocak 1999 / 7. baskı Kasım 2006
- Hayat Yolunda, Gençler İçin Anılar ve Öneriler / Kasım 1997 / 8. baskı Ekim 2007
- Bilim ve Yanılgı / 1997 / 5. baskı Aralık 2005
- 1980'lerde Türkiye
- Azerbaycan, Sovyetler ve Ötesi
- Bilim ve Yanılgı
- Haricîlik ve Şia
- Hayat Yolunda
- Lenin'siz Komünizm
- Politikada Şiddet
- Sovyet Rus Stratejisi ve Türkiye (2 cilt)
- Tarihten Geleceğe
- Osmanlı Mirasından Cumhuriyet Türkiyesi'ne
