= The Time Regulation Institute =

Novel by Ahmet Hamdi Tanpınar

- Author: Ahmet Hamdi Tanpınar
- Original title: Saatleri Ayarlama Enstitüsü
- Translator: Ender Gürol
- Language: Turkish
- Genre: Literary fiction
- Publisher: Remzi Kitabevi
- Publication date: 1961
- Publication place: Turkey
- English publication date: 2001
- Media type: Print

The Time Regulation Institute (Turkish: Saatleri Ayarlama Enstitüsü) is a novel by Ahmet Hamdi Tanpınar.

It began serialization in a newspaper in 1954. It was first published as a book in 1961. Yapı Kredi Yayınları republished the novel in 1999 as part of a campaign to publish various novels by Tanpınar in book form. Selim Kuru of the University of Washington wrote that the 1999 version was "poorly edited".

An English translation by Ender Gürol was published in 2001 by the Turco-Tatar Press. The English version includes an essay by Berna Moran and an appendix. This appendix includes a section not present in the Turkish versions. Another English translation by Maureen Freely and Alexander Dawe was published by Penguin Classics was released in 2013.

Kuru stated that The Time Regulation Institute "has an unbalanced flow" since it was serialized.

== Plot ==
The main character is Hayri İrdal, who narrates the novel and presents it like a memoir. The novel discusses his and other people's formation of the Time Regulation Institute, which changes the time on Turkey's clocks to that used in the West and educate the public about the importance of "being on top of one's own time". Before the Institute, Hayri İrdal meets a psychiatrist named Dr Ramiz, who later introduces İrdal to Halit Ayarcı. Known as the Regulator, Ayarcı is the bureaucratic mastermind who invents, funds, and markets the Institute.

Halit Ayarcı decides to establish the institute after talking about time while drinking rakı with Hayri İrdal. According to Saïd Sayrafiezadeh of Publishers Weekly the narrative starts late in the novel. Later in the novel, Hayri Irdal publishes a novel depicting himself and other characters at the Siege of Vienna.

The plot is a reference to the 1926 Gregorian Calendar Act by Kemal Atatürk.

== Characters ==
- Hayri İrdal - Kuru says that he is at times an unreliable narrator, and he distorts the sense of time within the work. Pankaj Mishra of The Guardian stated that İrdal prefers a life "in which idleness, or wasting time, is a source of happiness" rather than a punctual society promoted by Atatürk; Mishra added that "Confusion marks almost everything [İrdal] does".
- Mishra stated that "one of those superfluous semi-modern men familiar to us from Russian literature [sic]: more acted on than active, simering with inarticulate resentments and regrets, a cross between Oblomov and the protagonist of Notes from the Underground."
- Dr Ramiz - A Westernized man, Ramiz, who had studied in Vienna, Austria, had founded the Society for Psychoanalysis. Ramiz, who believes İrdal is ill, enjoys hearing İrdal's stories about traditional Turkish life.
- Halit Ayarcı, or Halit the Regulator, is someone İrdal refers to as "dear benefactor and beloved friend who plucked me from poverty and despair and made me the person I am today". Ayarcı becomes a mentor for İrdal.
  - Kuru stated that Halit becomes İrdal's "alter ego".
- İrdal's wife and children
- Abdüsselam Bey - İrdal's first father in law, described by Kirkus Reviews as "controlling"
- Nuri Efendi - Wise old clock repairman that once had Hayri Irdal as an apprentice when Hayri was young. Nuri Efendi’s famous words “Winding is chasing down the seconds!”" was later become the inspiration for Halit Ayarcı to set up the Time Regulation Institute.

== Reception ==
With regards to the 2001 English version Kuru stated that the novel "discusses modernity and modern societies in an entertainingly imaginative way" and that The Time Regulation Institute "is commended for classes on modernity, and not only on Turkish literature but on Middle Eastern literature and cultures."

With regards to the 2013 English version, Kirkus Reviews stated "Like all great satire, this book will make readers laugh and cringe in equal measure." Sayrafiezadeh had a negative reaction to the 2013 version, saying that the author had not adequately dramatized certain events.
