= Referans =

Former Turkish newspaper

- Type: Daily newspaper
- Owner: Doğan Media Group
- Editor: Eyüp Can
- Founded: 23 April 1996
- Ceased publication: 2010
- Language: Turkish
- Headquarters: Istanbul
- Circulation: 11,600 (June 2009)

Referans was a daily Turkish language business and economics newspaper, published in Istanbul. It was acquired in 2004 by Aydın Doğan's Doğan Media Group, and in 2010 merged with the group's paper Radikal. Its final editor was Eyüp Can.

From its foundation until 31 May 2004 it was run by the Financial Forum.
