= Ahmet Hamdi Tanpınar =

Turkish poet, novelist, literary scholar and essayist (1901–1962)

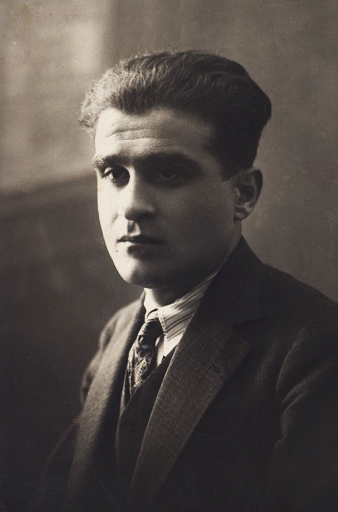
- Born: 23 June 1901; Istanbul, Ottoman Empire
- Died: 24 January 1962 (aged 60); Istanbul, Turkey
- Resting place: Aşiyan Asri Cemetery
- Education: Istanbul University
- Occupations: Writer, poet, scholar
- Writing career
- Period: 1921–1961
- Notable works: A Mind at Peace; The Time Regulation Institute
- Literary movement: Modernism

Ahmet Hamdi Tanpınar (23 June 1901 – 24 January 1962) was a Turkish poet, novelist, literary scholar and essayist, widely regarded as one of the most important representatives of modernism in Turkish literature. In addition to his literary and academic career, Tanpınar was also a member of the Turkish Parliament between 1944 and 1946.

== Early life and education ==
Tanpınar was born in Istanbul on 23 June 1901, the youngest of three children. His father, Hüseyin Fikri Efendi, was a judge. Hüseyin Fikri Efendi was of Georgian origin, his family having roots in the city of Maçahel. Tanpınar's mother, Nesime Bahriye Hanım, died of typhus in Mosul in 1915, when Tanpınar was thirteen.

Because his father's vocation required frequent relocation, Tanpınar continued his education in several different cities, including Istanbul, Sinop, Siirt, Kirkuk, and Antalya. After quitting veterinary college, he resumed his educational career at the Faculty of Literature at Istanbul University, which he completed in 1923.. During his time at the university, Tanpınar was tutored by Yahya Kemal, whose views deeply influenced the pupil's intellectual development and ideas about aesthetics, literature, Turkish history and culture. Between the years 1921 and 1923, Tanpınar published 11 poems in the literary publication Dergâh, which was founded by Yahya Kemal. He graduated from Istanbul University in 1923 after defending his thesis on Şeyhî's Hüsrev ü Şirin, a widely influential 15th-century masnavi frequently recomposed by various poets in subsequent periods, sometimes with the title Ferhad ü Şirin.

== Later life and work ==
After graduating, Tanpınar began to teach. Throughout his academic career, he taught at high schools in Erzurum (1923–24), Konya, Ankara, Istanbul, the Educational Institute of Gazi and the Fine Arts Academy. At the Fine Arts Academy, besides teaching literature, Tanpınar lectured on branches of aesthetics in arts, history of art and mythology (1932–39). As an educator, he provoked debate and a degree of controversy in the 1930s after arguing for the elimination of pre-Tanzimat literature from national school curricula. In 1939, despite not having obtained a doctorate, Tanpınar was appointed to the newly founded chair of 19th-Century Turkish Literature, as professor of New Turkish Literature, at the Istanbul University Literature Faculty by the minister of education, Hasan Âli Yücel, and was tasked with writing a history of post-Tanzimat Turkish literature. He published this study as XIX. Asır Türk Edebiyatı Tarihi in 1949. He also contributed to several publications, including Yedigün.

The 1940s marked a period of great productivity for Tanpınar. Beş Şehir (Five Cities, 1946), a collection of essays on the cities of Erzurum, Konya, Istanbul, Bursa and Ankara, followed the publication of his first novel, Mahur Beste in 1944. Huzur (translated to English as A Mind at Peace) appeared in 1949 and Sahnenin Dışındakiler (Those Who Stand Outside the Stage) in 1950. Together, these three novels constitute a trilogy. In 1953, he made an extensive journey to Europe over the course of six months, traveling to many countries including France, Belgium, Holland, England, Spain and Italy.

In 1954, Tanpınar published Saatleri Ayarlama Enstitüsü, translated as The Time Regulation Institute. The book explores, in an often absurd and sardonic style making heavy use of symbolic imagery, topics as Turkey's troubled transition to a modern society and the departure from old values (and sometimes from reason) that it entails. Şiirler (Poems), a selection of 37 poems of the 74 Tanpınar published in his lifetime, appeared in print in 1961, the year before his death. Scholars have traced his "path to modernism" to a letter he wrote that same year to a child in Antalya.

== Political career ==
Between the years 1944 to 1946, Tanpınar served as a member of the Grand National Assembly of Turkey representing Kahramanmaraş (then known as Maraş). He was a member of the Republican People's Party, at the time the only party with seats in parliament.

== Death and legacy ==
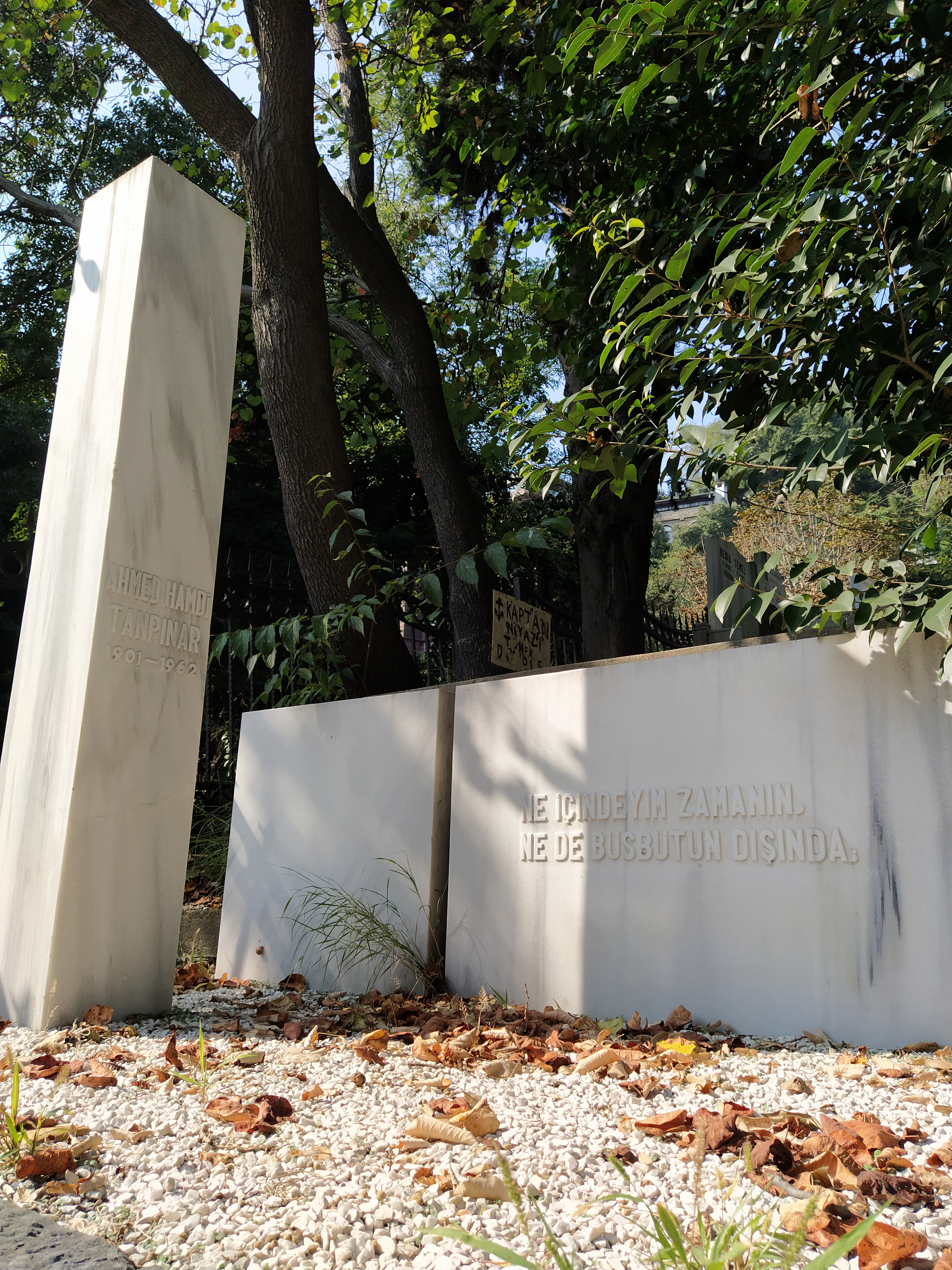
Tombstone of Ahmet Hamdi Tanpınar in Istanbul

Tanpınar died of a heart attack on 24 January 1962, aged 60, in Istanbul. His grave is in the Aşiyan Cemetery, Istanbul, close to that of his old mentor Yahya Kemal. His epitaph bears the following first two lines from his poem Ne İçindeyim Zamanın:

Ne içindeyim zamanın
Ne de büsbütün dışında

('Neither am I within time
Nor completely out of it')

Many works which Tanpınar was unable to publish in his lifetime were released posthumously. Although Tanpınar did not write many novels, his corpus of prose fiction has been extensively studied by Turkish literary critics. The Istanbul Tanpınar Literature Festival (ITEF) is named in honor of Tanpınar and has been held annually since 2009, and Ahmet Hamdi Tanpınar Literature Museum Library, a museum dedicated to Turkish literature in the Eminönü district of Istanbul, was opened in 2011 by the Ministry of Culture and Tourism.

== Bibliography in Turkish ==
- Poetry: Şiirler, 1961
- Stories: Abdullah Efendinin Rüyaları, 1943; Yaz Yağmuru, 1955; Hikâyeler, 1983
- Novels: Huzur 1949; Saatleri Ayarlama Enstitüsü, 1962; Sahnenin Dışındakiler, 1973; Mahur Beste, 1975; Aydaki Kadın, 1987
- Essays: Beş Şehir, 1946; Yahya Kemal, 1967; Edebiyat Üzerine Makaleler, 1969; Yaşadığım Gibi, 1970
- Monographs: XIX. Asır Türk Edebiyatı Tarihi, 1949; Tevfik Fikret, 1937

== Bibliography in English ==
- A Mind at Peace (Huzur, serial novel, 1948), trans. Erdağ Göknar (Archipelago Books, 2008). ISBN 0-9793330-5-9 (a story of the people of Istanbul, set at the beginning of World War II)
- The Time Regulation Institute (Saatleri Ayarlama Enstitüsü, serial novel, 1954), trans. Ender Gürol (Turko-Tatar Press, 2001). Trans. by Alexander Dawe and Maureen Freely (31 Dec 2013)
- Tanpinar's Five Cities (Beş Şehir, 1946), trans. Ruth Christie (Anthem Press, 2018) ISBN 978-1-78308-848-5

== See also ==
- Istanbul Tanpınar Literature Festival
- Ahmet Hamdi Tanpınar Literature Museum Library
