= Radikal =

Former daily newspaper, published in Istanbul

- Type: Daily newspaper
- Format: Tabloid
- Owner: Doğan Media Group
- Editor: Eyüp Can
- Founded: 13 October 1996
- Ceased publication: 25 March 2016
- Political alignment: Social liberalism
- Language: Turkish
- Headquarters: Yüzyıl, Bağcılar, Istanbul
- Circulation: 25,330 (July 2013)
- Website: www.radikal.com.tr

Radikal (lit. 'Radical') was a daily liberal Turkish language newspaper, published in Istanbul. From 1996 it was published by Aydın Doğan's Doğan Media Group. Although Radikal did not endorse a particular political alignment, it was generally considered by the public to be a social liberal newspaper. Despite only having a circulation of around 25,000 (July 2013), it was considered one of the most influential Turkish newspapers.

It was praised for its culture, arts, and interview sections, as well as having columnists such as M. Serdar Kuzuloğlu, Hakkı Devrim, Yıldırım Türker, Türker Alkan, Tarhan Erdem, Cengiz Çandar, and Altan Öymen. Hasan Celal Güzel, former minister of national education, Murat Yetkin, and Mustafa Akyol, son of Taha Akyol, also wrote for Radikal.

On 22 March 2016, the newspaper announced it was shutting down at the end of the month due to financial reasons.

== History ==
Radikal was founded in 1996, and "within a decade ... had become one of the most influential newspapers in the country, especially renowned for its top-drawer columnists and its coverage of intellectual debates". Its circulation, however, remained relatively low.

In 2004 Radikal was awarded the Turk Democracy Associations "Democracy Media Award" (jointly with Zaman).

In 2007, Serkan Özkaya, Orhan Pamuk, and Sezen Aksu each became Radikal's temporary editor-in-chief for a day.

The Dogan Group's economics daily Referans was merged into Radikal in 2010, with Referans editor-in-chief Eyüp Can becoming editor-in-chief of the combined paper, replacing İsmet Berkan. Later in 2010 the paper moved to a tabloid format and introduced new columnists Dilek Kurban of TESEV, Cüneyt Özdemir, and Sırrı Süreyya Önder.

The newspaper stopped printing on 21 June 2014 and was published only digitally, before it was abruptly shut down in March 2016. On 4 April 2016, its columnists published their farewell articles on its webpage, reflecting on Radikal's past 20 years. In July 2022, the domain of the newspaper was deserted, resulting the online archive to wipe out. Demirören Holding, the rights owner, did not make any disclosure about the shutdown.

== Sections ==
The paper had the following sections, among others:

- Türkiye - usually with domestic news
- Yaşam (lit. 'Life') - usually with health and entertainment articles from Turkey and the world
- Politika - with political news, focusing on domestic
- Dış Haberler - with foreign news
- Yorum - opinion pieces, editorials
- Ekonomi - economic news
- Spor - sports news
- Kültür/Sanat - with cultural and art news
- "Sıcak Haber" (lit. 'Breaking News'), online edition with the printed articles

The paper also published four supplements:

- "Kitap" (lit. 'Book'), weekly book reviews, out on Fridays
- "Cumartesi" (lit. 'Saturday'), weekend entertainment and news, out on Saturdays
- "Radikal 2", op-eds, mostly on social-democracy or current political issues, out on Sundays
- "Genç" (lit. 'Young'), op-eds submitted by college students, out every other Tuesday.

== Notable contributors ==
- İsmail Saymaz (investigative journalist)
- Ezgi Başaran (investigative reporter and website managing editor, awarded the Müşerref Hekimoğlu Award 2012)
- Ertuğrul Mavioğlu (news co-ordinator)
- Altan Öymen (columnist)
- Orhan Kemal Cengiz
- Cengiz Çandar (columnist)
- Cüneyt Özdemir (columnist)
- Ümit Kivanç (columnist)
- Yiğit Bulut (columnist, 2001–2007)
- Perihan Mağden (columnist, 2001–2008)
- Oral Çalışlar (columnist, 2008–2013)
- Sırrı Süreyya Önder (columnist, 2010–2011)
