= Zadar =

City in Croatia

- City
- Grad Zadar; City of Zadar
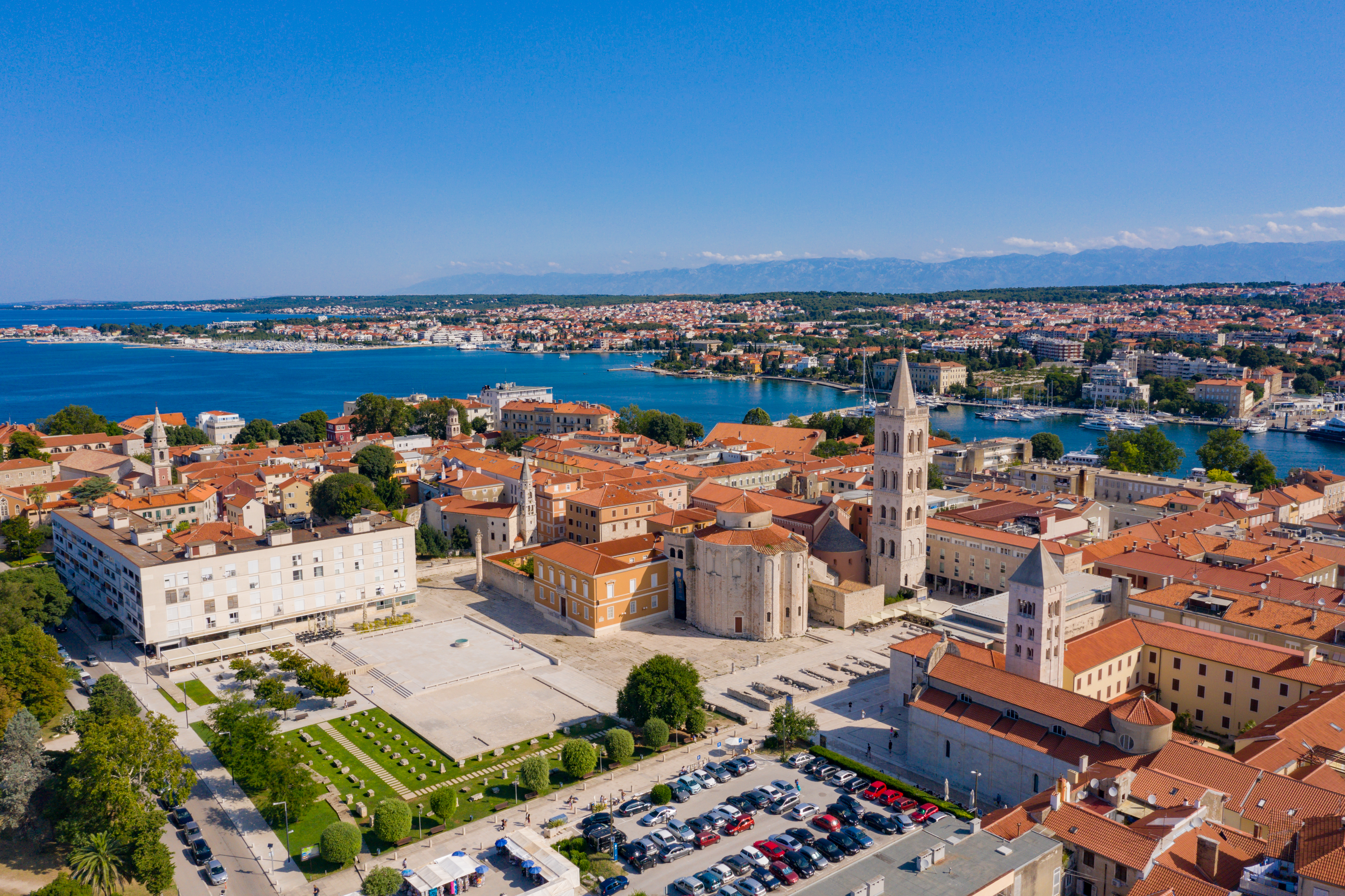
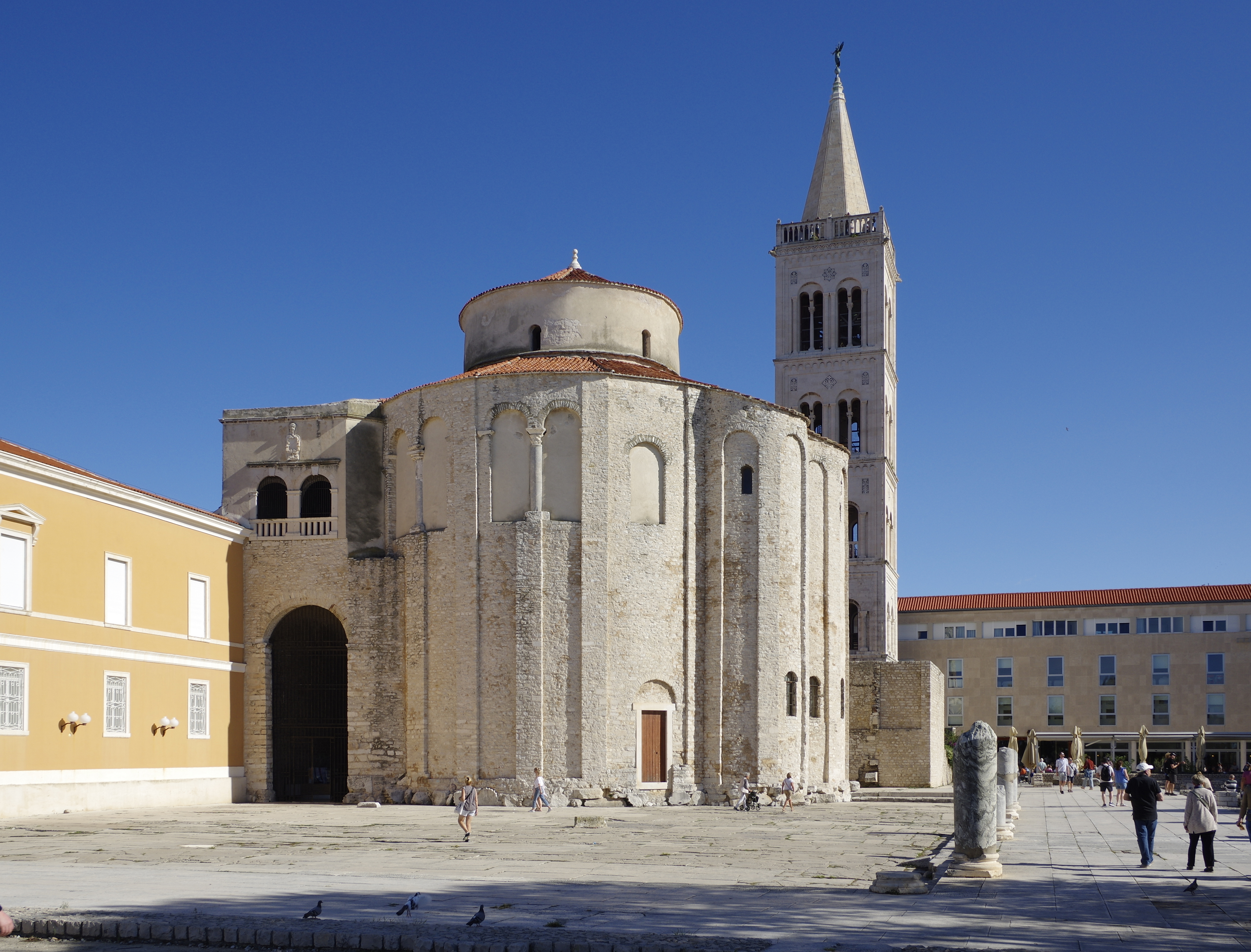
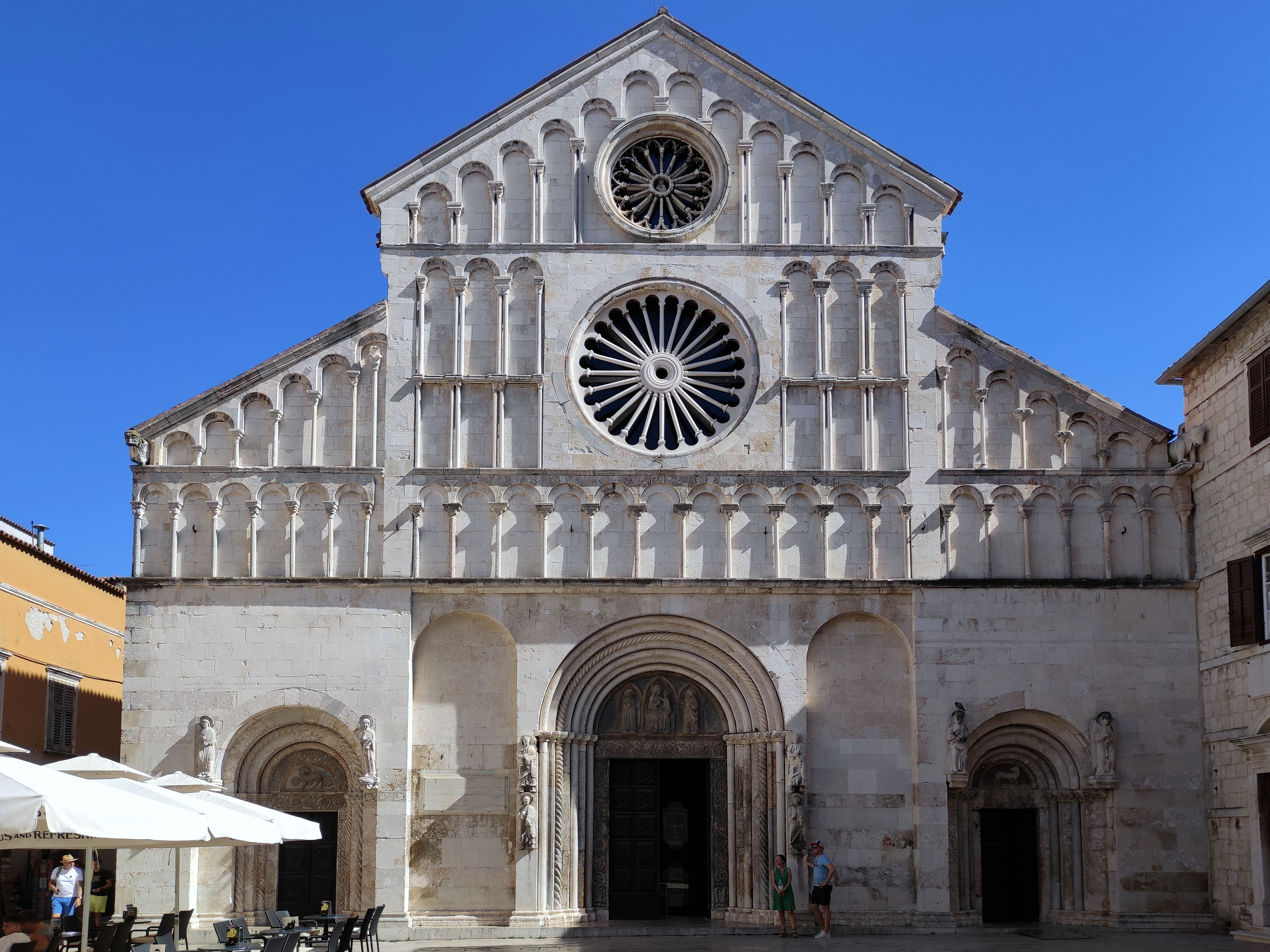
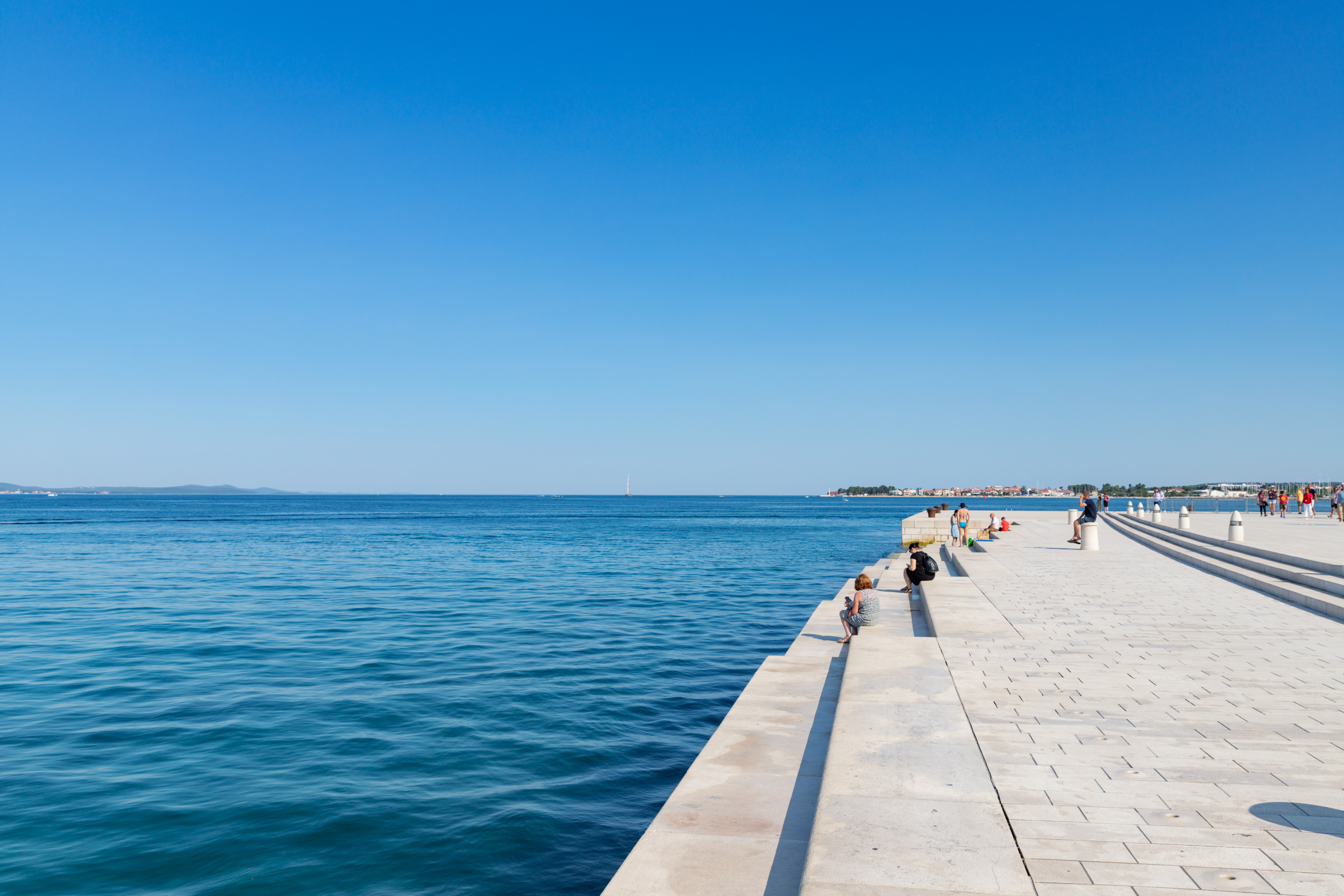
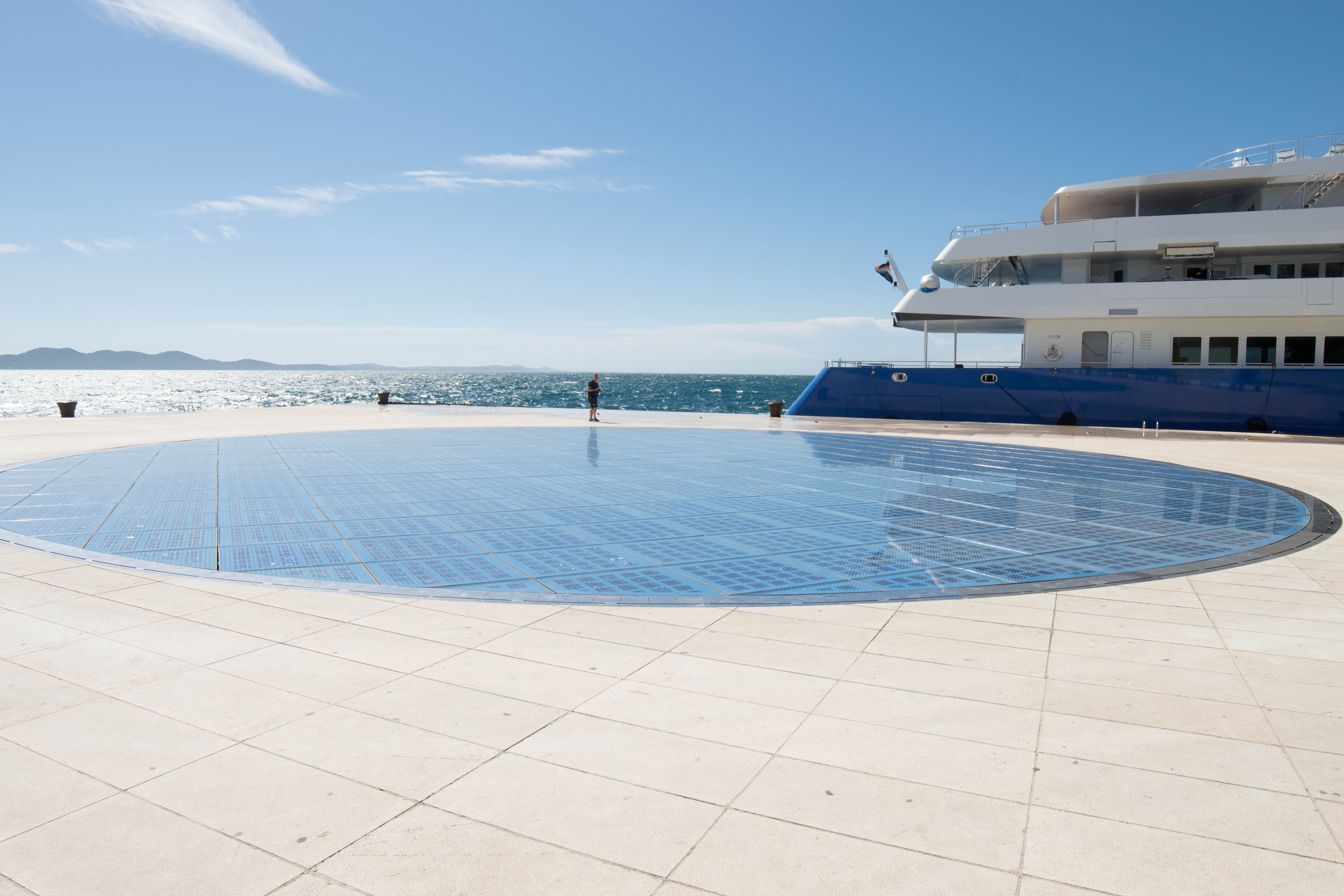
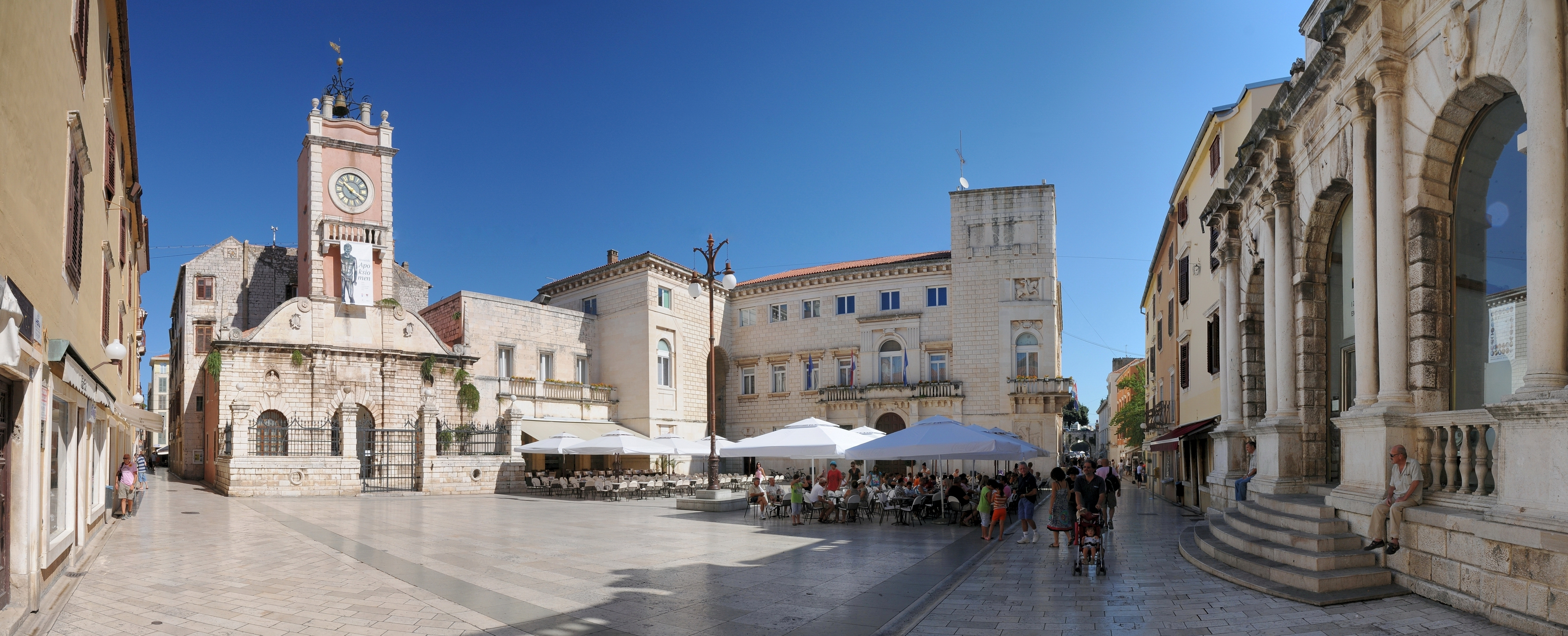
- View of Zadar from Zadar Cathedral Bell Tower Church of St. Donatus Zadar Cathedral Sea Organ Monument to the Sun People's Square and Zadar City Hall

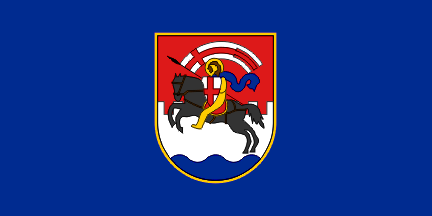
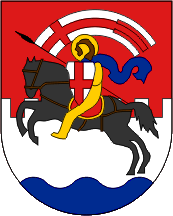
- Flag Coat of arms
- Interactive map of Zadar
- Location of Zadar in Croatia
- Coordinates: 44°6′51″N 15°13′39″E
- Country: Croatia
- Region: Dalmatia
- County: Zadar County
- Liburni settlement: 9th century BC
- Roman foundation Colonia Iulia Iader: 48 BC

Government
  - Mayor: Šime Erlić (HDZ)

Area
  - City: 192.4 km^{2} (74.3 sq mi)
  - Urban: 51.3 km^{2} (19.8 sq mi)
  - Metro: 194 km^{2} (75 sq mi)

Population (2021)
  - City: 70,779
  - Density: 367.9/km^{2} (952.8/sq mi)
  - Urban: 67,309
  - Urban density: 1,310/km^{2} (3,400/sq mi)
- Time zone: UTC+1 (CET)
  - Summer (DST): UTC+2 (CEST)
- Postal code: HR-23 000
- Area code: +385 23
- Vehicle registration: ZD
- Patron saints: Saint Anastasia; Saint Chrysogonus; Saint Simeon; Saint Zoilus
- Website: www.grad-zadar.hr

UNESCO World Heritage Site
- Official name: Venetian Works of Defence between the 16th and 17th Centuries: Stato da Terra – Western Stato da Mar
- Criteria: Cultural: iii, iv
- Reference: 1533
- Inscription: 2017 (41st Session)
- Area: 378.37 ha (935.0 acres)

Zadar (US: /ˈzɑːdɑːr/ ZAH-dar, Croatian: [zâdar]), historically known as Zara (from Venetian and Italian, pronounced [ˈdzaːra]; see also other names), is the oldest continuously inhabited city in Croatia. It is situated on the Adriatic Sea, at the northwestern part of Ravni Kotari region. Zadar serves as the seat of Zadar County and of the wider northern Dalmatian region. The city proper covers 25 km^{2} (9.7 sq mi) with a population of 75,082 in 2011, making it the second-largest city in Dalmatia and the fifth-largest in the country.

Zadar traces its origins to the 9th century BC as a settlement of the Illyrian tribe of the Liburnians, called Iader. In 59 BC, it was renamed Iadera (Jadera) when it became a Roman municipium. In 48 BC, it became a Roman colony. During Roman rule, Zadar acquired the characteristics of a traditional ancient Roman city, with a regular street grid, a public square (forum), and an elevated capitolium with a temple. After the fall of the Western Roman Empire in 476 AD, Zadar became the capital of the Byzantine Theme of Dalmatia.

At the beginning of the 9th century, Zadar briefly came under Frankish rule. In 998, the city swore allegiance to Doge Pietro II Orseolo and became a vassal of the Republic of Venice. In 1186, it placed itself under the protection of the Hungarian King Béla III. In the Middle Ages, Zadar's population was predominantly Romance and the Dalmatian language was spoken, later largely replaced with related Venetian, which would remain the principal language spoken in the city until the 20th century.

In 1202, during the Fourth Crusade, the Venetians, with the help of the Crusaders, reconquered and plundered Zadar. The Kingdom of Hungary gained control of the city following the Treaty of Zadar in 1358, when it was taken by King Louis I. In 1409, King Ladislaus of Naples sold Dalmatia back to Venice, and Zadar became the de facto capital of Venetian Dalmatia. When the Ottoman Empire conquered the Dalmatian Hinterland in the early 16th century, the city became an important stronghold safeguarding Venetian trade in the Adriatic, as well as the administrative and cultural center of Venetian possessions in Dalmatia. This fostered an environment in which art and literature could flourish, and between the 15th and 17th centuries Zadar came under the influence of the Renaissance, producing many important Italian Renaissance figures such as Giorgio Ventura and Giovanni Francesco Fortunio, who wrote the first Italian grammar, as well as many Croatian writers, including Petar Zoranić, Brne Krnarutić, Juraj Baraković, and Šime Budinić, who wrote in the Croatian language. After the fall of the Venetian Republic in 1797, Zadar briefly came under French administration as part of the Illyrian Provinces. From 1815 to 1918 it served as the capital of the Kingdom of Dalmatia, a crown land of the Austrian Empire (and later Austria-Hungary). Throughout the 19th century, the city became one of the centres of the Illyrian movement amid the growing polarisation and politicisation of ethnic identities between Croats and Dalmatian Italians, the latter forming a majority of Zadar's citizens.

Under the Treaty of Rapallo in 1920, Zadar became part of the Kingdom of Italy. During World War II, it was bombed by the Allies and witnessed the evacuation of its ethnic Italian population. The Partisans captured the city on 1 November 1944, and in 1947 it officially became part of the Socialist Republic of Croatia (a federal constituent republic of Yugoslavia). It was then repopulated by new settlers, mainly from the surrounding islands and from the hinterland. After the breakup of Yugoslavia, in 1991 Zadar became part of the Republic of Croatia.

Today, Zadar is a historical center of Dalmatia, Zadar County's principal political, cultural, commercial, industrial, educational, and transportation centre. Zadar is also the episcopal see of the Archdiocese of Zadar. Because of its rich history and cultural heritage, Zadar is today one of the most popular tourist destinations in Croatia, named the "entertainment center of the Adriatic" by The Times and "Croatia's new capital of cool" by The Guardian.

UNESCO's World Heritage Site list included the fortified city of Zadar as part of the Venetian Works of Defence between the 16th and 17th centuries: Stato da Terra – Western Stato da Mar in 2017.

== Etymology and historical names ==
The name of the city of Zadar emerged as Iadera and Iader in ancient times. It was most probably related to a hydrographical term, coined by an ancient Mediterranean people and their Pre-Indo-European language. They transmitted it to later settlers, the Liburnians. The name of the Liburnian settlement was first mentioned by a Greek inscription from Pharos (Stari Grad) on the island of Hvar in 384 BC, where the citizens of Zadar were noted as Ἰαδασινοί (Iadasinoi). According to the Greek source Periplus of Pseudo-Scylax the city was Ἴδασσα (Idassa), probably a Greek transcription of the original Liburnian expression.

During antiquity the name was often recorded in sources in Latin in two forms: Iader in the inscriptions and in the writings of classic writers, Iadera predominantly among the late Antiquity writers, while usual ethnonyms were Iadestines and Iadertines. The accent was on the first syllable in both Iader and Iadera forms, which influenced the early-Medieval Dalmatian forms Jadra, Jadera and Jadertina, where the accent kept its original place.

In Dalmatian, Jadra/Jadera was pronounced Zadra/Zadera, due to the phonetic transformation of j [j] to z [z]. That change was also reflected in the Croatian name Zadar (recorded as Zader in the 12th century), developed from masculine Zadъrъ. An ethnonym graphic Jaderani from the legend of Saint Chrysogonus in the 9th century, was identical to the initial old-Slavic form Zadъrane, or Renaissance Croatian Zadrani.

The Dalmatian names Jadra, Jadera were transferred to other languages; in Venetian Jatara (hyper-urbanism in the 9th century) and Zara, Hungarian Zára, Tuscan Giara, Latin Iadora and Diadora (Constantine VII in De Administrando Imperio, 10th century, probably an error in the transcription of di iadora), Old French Jadres (Geoffroy de Villehardouin in the chronicles of the Fourth Crusade in 1202), Arabic Jādhara (جاذَرة) and Jādara (جادَرة) (Al-Idrisi, 12th century), Iadora (Guido, 12th century), Catalan Jazara, Jara, Sarra (14th century) and the others.

Jadera became Zara when it fell under the authority of the Republic of Venice in the 15th century. Zara was later used by the Austrian Empire in the 19th century, but it was provisionally changed to Zadar/Zara from 1910 to 1920; from 1920 to 1947 the city became part of Italy as Zara, and finally was named Zadar in 1947.

== History ==
Historical affiliations

- Liburnia (9th century BC – 59 BC)
- Roman Empire (59 BC – 476)
- Byzantine Empire (476–800)
- Carolingian Empire (800–812)
- Byzantine Empire (812 – 998)
- Republic of Venice (998–1050)
- Kingdom of Croatia (1050–1050)
- Republic of Venice (1050–1114)
- Kingdom of Hungary (1114–1118)
- Republic of Venice (1118–1183)
- Kingdom of Hungary (1183–1202)
- Republic of Venice (1202–1358)
- Kingdom of Hungary (1358–1409)
- Republic of Venice (1409–1797)
- (Austrian Empire) Habsburg monarchy (1797–1804)
- Austrian Empire (1804–1805)
- (Kingdom of Italy (Napoleonic)) Napoleonic Italy (1806–1809)
- (France) Illyrian Provinces (1809–1813)
- Austrian Empire late Austria-Hungary (1813–1918)
- Kingdom of Italy (1918–1946)
- Italy (1946–1947)
- (Socialist Federal Republic of Yugoslavia) SFR Yugoslavia ( (Socialist Republic of Croatia) SR Croatia) (1947–1991)
- Croatia (1991–present)

=== Prehistory ===
The district of present-day Zadar has been populated since prehistoric times. The earliest evidence of human life comes from the Late Stone Age, while numerous settlements have been dated as early as the Neolithic. Before the Illyrians, the area was inhabited by an ancient Mediterranean people of a pre-Indo-European culture. They assimilated with the Indo-Europeans who settled between the 4th and 2nd millennium BC into a new ethnical unity, that of the Liburnians. Zadar was a Liburnian settlement, laid out in the 9th century BC, built on a small stone islet and embankments where the old city stands and tied to the mainland by the overflown narrow isthmus, which created a natural port in its northern strait.

=== Antiquity ===
The Liburnians, an Illyrian tribe, were known as great sailors and merchants, but also had a reputation for piracy in the later years. By the 7th century BC, Zadar had become an important centre for their trading activities with the Phoenicians, Etruscans, Ancient Greeks and other Mediterranean peoples. Its population at that time is estimated at 2,000. From the 9th to the 6th century there was certain cultural unity in the Adriatic Sea, with the general Liburninan seal, whose naval supremacy meant both political and economical authority through several centuries. Due to its geographical position, Zadar developed into a main seat of the Liburnian thalassocracy and took a leading role in the Liburnian tetradekapolis, an organization of 14 communes.

The people of Zadar, Iadasinoi, were first mentioned in 384 BC as the allies of the natives of Hvar and the leaders of an eastern Adriatic coast coalition in the fight against the Greek colonizers. An expedition of 10,000 men in 300 ships sailed out from Zadar and laid siege to the Greek colony Pharos in the island of Hvar, but the Syracusan fleet of Dionysus was alerted and attacked the siege fleet. The naval victory went to the Greeks which allowed them relatively safer further colonization in the southern Adriatic.

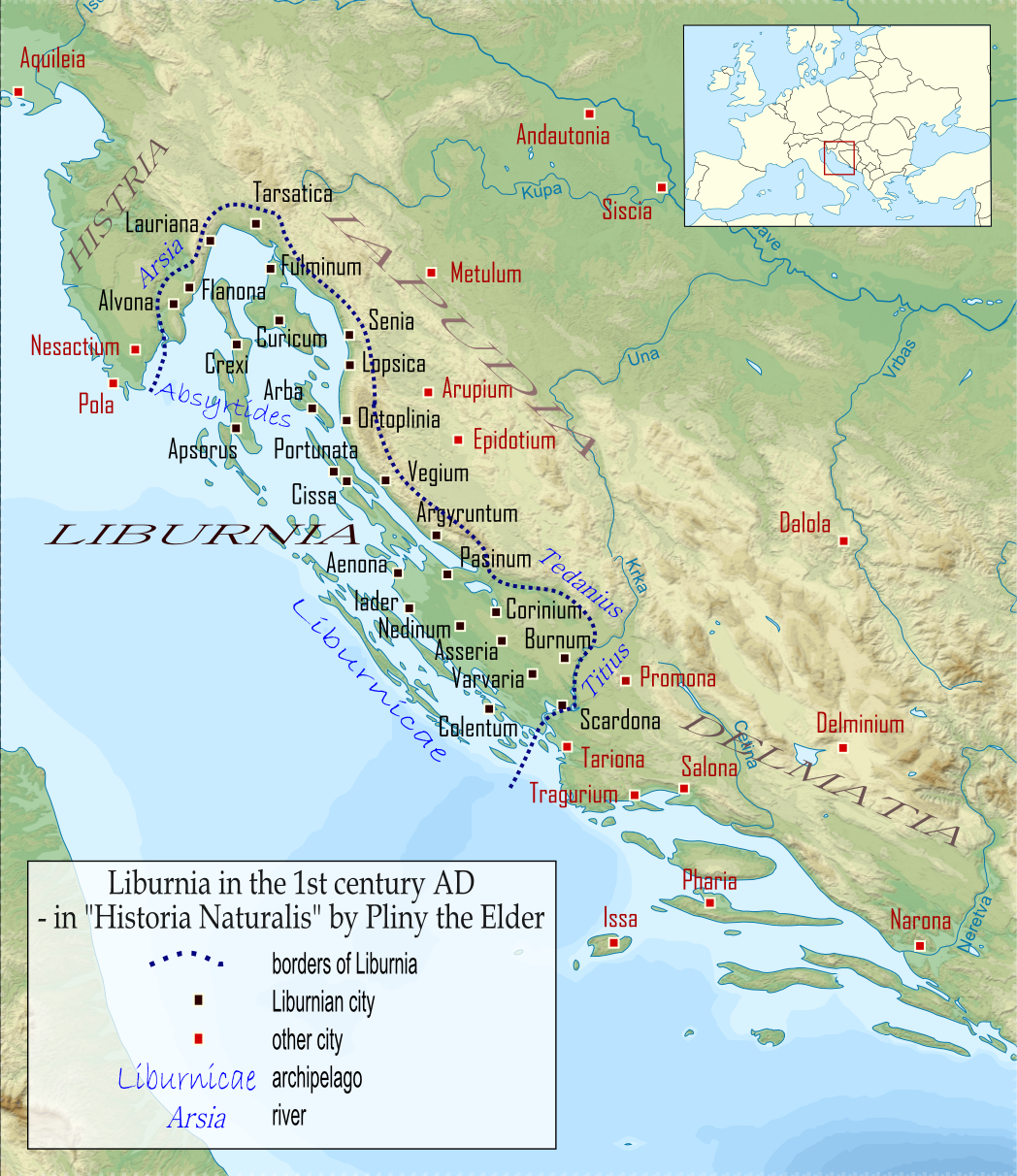
Zadar (Iader) and the other cities of the Liburnian tetradecapolis in the age of the Roman conquest

The archaeological remains have shown that the main centres of Liburnian territorial units or municipalities were already urbanized in the last centuries of the BC era. Before the Roman conquest, in the 2nd century BC, Zadar held a territory of more than 600 km^{2} (230 sq mi).

In the middle of the 2nd century BC, the Romans began to gradually invade the region. Although being first Roman enemies in the Adriatic Sea, the Liburnians, mostly stood aside in more than 230 years of Roman wars with the Illyrians, to protect their naval and trade connections in the sea. In 59 BC, Illyricum was assigned as a provincia (zone of responsibility) to Julius Caesar and Liburnian Iadera became a Roman municipium.

The Liburnian naval force was dragged into the Roman civil war between Julius Caesar and Pompey in 49 BC, partially by force, partially because of the local interests of the participants, the Liburnian cities. Caesar was supported by the urban Liburnian centres, like Iader (Zadar), Aenona (Nin) and Curicum (Krk), while the city of Issa (Vis) and the rest of the Liburnians gave their support to Pompey. In 49 BC near the island of Krk, the "Navy of Zadar", equipped by the fleets of a few Liburnian cities and supported by some Roman ships, lost an important naval battle against Pompey supporting the "Liburnian navy". The civil war was prolonged until the end of 48 BC, when Caesar rewarded his supporters in Liburnian Iader and Dalmatian Salona, by giving the status of the Roman colonies to their communities. Thus the city was granted the title colonia Iulia Iader, after its founder, and in the next period some of the Roman colonists (mostly legionary veterans) settled there.

The real establishment of the Roman province of Illyricum occurred not earlier than 33 BC and Octavian's military campaign in Illyria and Liburnia, when the Liburnians finally lost their naval independence and their galleys and sailors were incorporated into the Roman naval fleets.

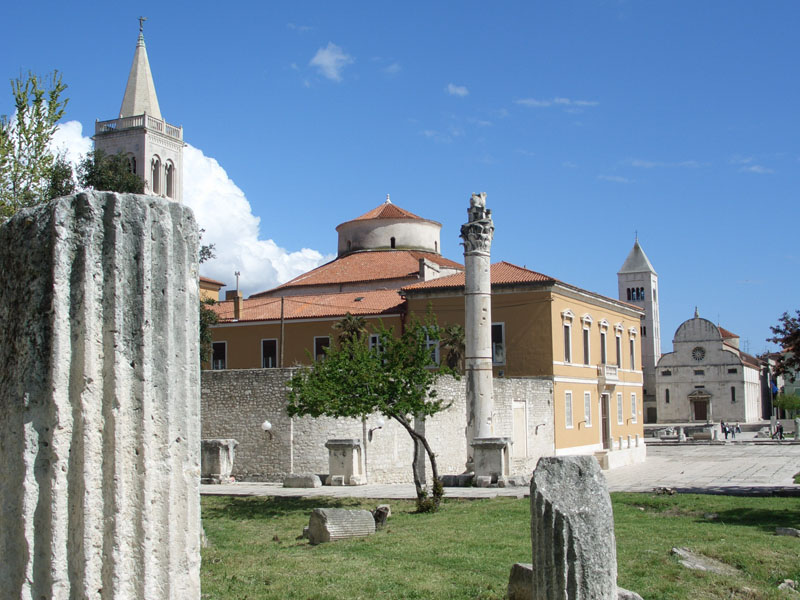
Roman forum remains in Zadar

From the early days of Roman rule, Zadar gained its Roman urban character and developed into one of the most flourishing centres on the eastern Adriatic coast, a state of affairs which lasted for several hundred years. The town was organised according to the typical Roman street system with a rectangular street plan, a forum, thermae, a sewage and water supply system that came from lake Vrana, by way of a 40 kilometres (25 miles) long aqueduct. It did not play a significant role in the Roman administration of Dalmatia, although the archaeological finds tell us about a significant growth of economy and culture.

Christianity did not bypass the Roman province of Dalmatia. Already by the end of the 3rd century Zadar had its own bishop and founding of its Christian community took place; a new religious centre was built north of the forum together with a basilica and a baptistery, as well as other ecclesiastical buildings. According to some estimates, in the 4th century it had probably around ten thousand citizens, including the population from its ager, the nearby islands and hinterland, an admixture of the indigenous Liburnians and Roman colonists.

=== Early Middle Ages ===
Defensive System of Zadar
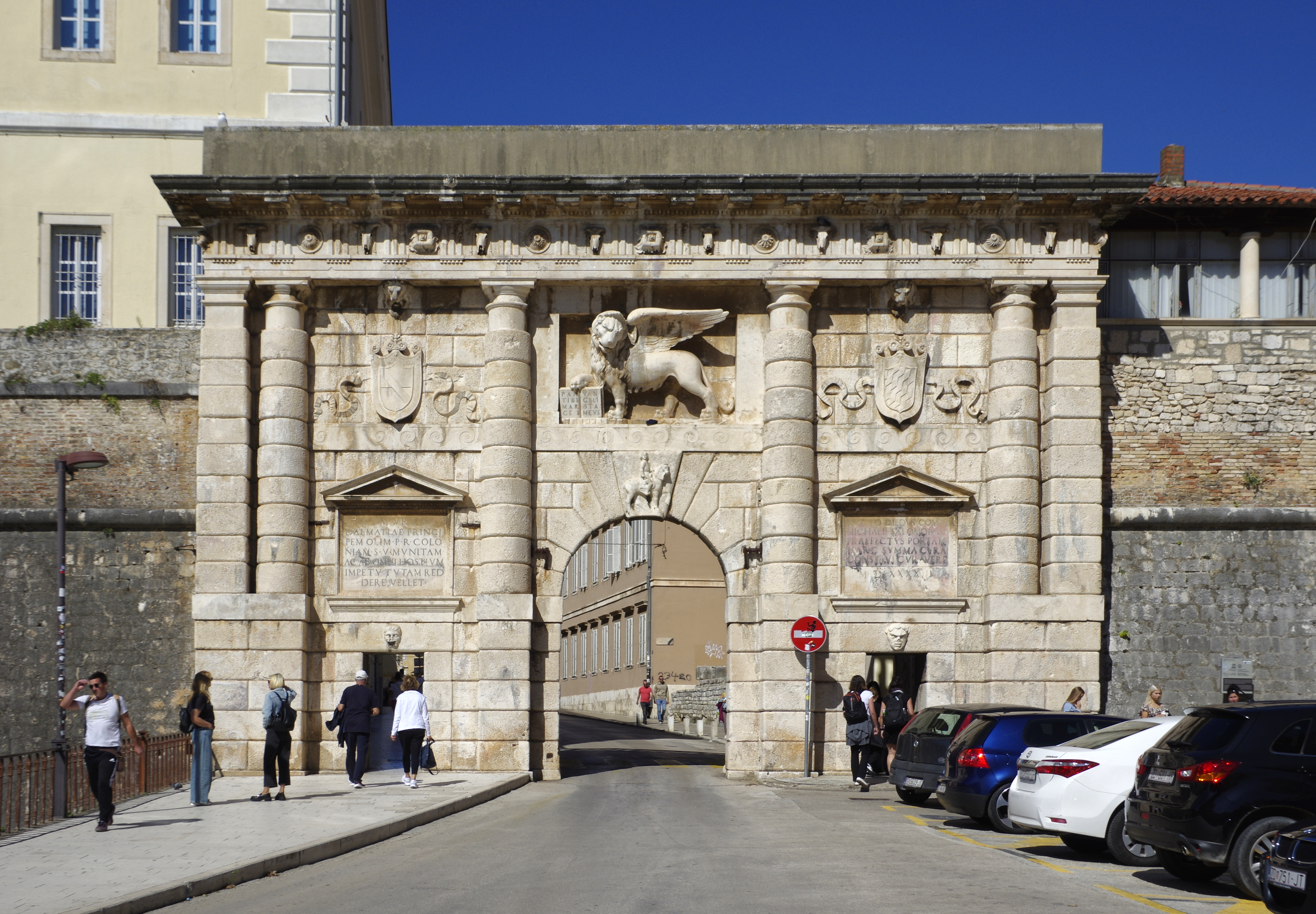
- Zadar's "Kopnena vrata" (Landward Gate) with the Lion of Saint Mark, a symbol of the Republic of Venice, above it
- Interactive map of Defensive System of Zadar
- 44.112°N 15.229°E
- Location: Zadar County, Croatia

UNESCO World Heritage Site
- Type: Cultural
- Criteria: iii, iv
- Designated: 2017 (41 Session)
- Part of: Venetian Works of Defence between 15th and 17th centuries: Stato da Terra – western Stato da Mar
- Reference no.: 1533
- Region: Europe and North America

During the Migration Period and the Barbarian invasions, Zadar was one of the remaining Dalmatian city-states, but it stagnated. In 441 and 447 Dalmatia was ravaged by the Huns, after the fall of the Western Roman Empire, in 481 Dalmatia became part of the Ostrogothic kingdom, which, besides Italy, already included the more northerly parts of Illyricum, i.e. Pannonia and Noricum.

In the 5th century, under the rule of the Ostrogothic Kingdom, Zadar became poor with many civic buildings ruined due to its advanced age. About the same time (6th century) it was hit by an earthquake, which destroyed entire complexes of monumental Roman architecture, whose parts would later serve as material for building houses. This caused a loss of population and created demographic changes in the city, then gradually repopulated by the inhabitants from its hinterland. However, during six decades of Gothic rule, the Goths saved those old Roman Municipal institutions that were still in function, while religious life in Dalmatia even intensified in the last years, so that there was a need for the foundation of additional bishoprics.

In 536, the Byzantine emperor Justinian the Great started a military campaign to reconquer the territories of the former Western Empire (see Gothic War) and in 553 Zadar passed to the Byzantine Empire. In 568, Dalmatia was devastated by an Avar invasion. Although further waves of attacks by Avar and Slav tribes kept up the pressure, it was the only city which survived due to its protective belt of inland plains. The Dalmatian capital Salona was captured and destroyed in the 640s, so Zadar became the new seat of the Byzantine archonty of Dalmatia, territorially reduced to a few coastal cities with their agers and municipal lands at the coast and the islands nearby. The prior of Zadar had jurisdiction over all Byzantine Dalmatia, so Zadar enjoyed metropolitan status at the eastern Adriatic coast. At this time rebuilding began to take place in the city.

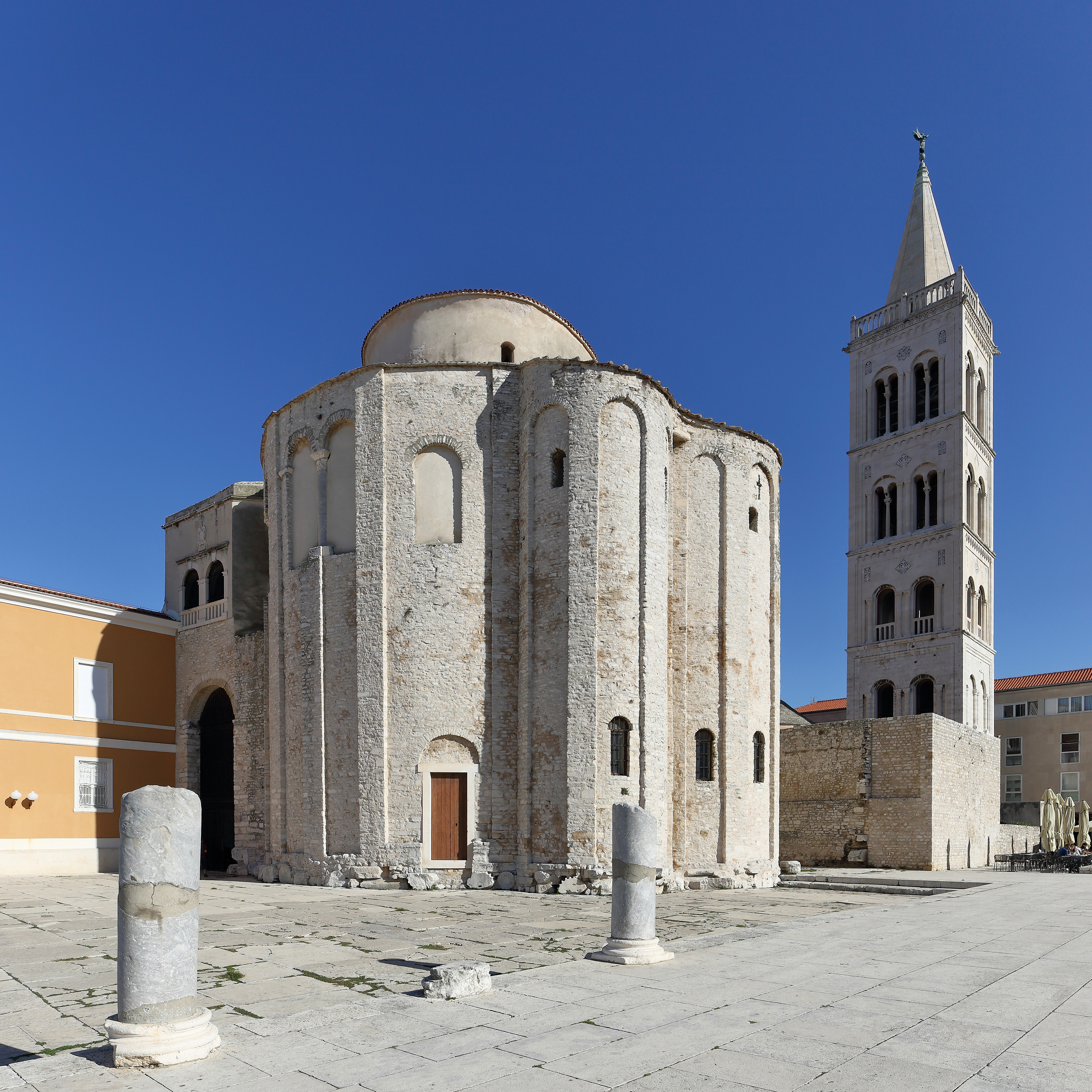
St. Donatus church, 9th century

At the beginning of the 9th century the Zadar bishop Donatus and the city duke Paul mediated in the dispute between the Holy Roman empire under Pepin and the Byzantine Empire. The Franks held Zadar for a short time, but the city was returned to Byzantium by a decision of the 812 Treaty of Aachen.

Zadar's economy revolved around the sea, fishing and sea trade in the first centuries of the Middle Ages. Thanks to saved Antique ager, adjusted municipal structure and a new strategic position, it became the most important city between the Kvarner islands and Kaštela Bay. Byzantine Dalmatia was not territorially unified, but an alliance of city municipalities headed by Zadar, and the large degree of city autonomy allowed the development of Dalmatian cities as free communes. Forced to turn their attention seawards, the inhabitants of Zadar focused on shipping, and the city became a naval power to rival Venice. The citizens were Dalmatian speakers, but from the 7th century Croatian started to spread in the region, becoming predominant in the inland and the islands to the end of the 9th century.

The Mediterranean and Adriatic cities developed significantly during a period of peace from the last decades of the 9th to the middle of the 10th century. Especially favourable conditions for navigation in the Adriatic Sea occurred since the Saracen raids had finished. Also the adjustment of relations with the Croats enabled Zadar merchants to trade with its rich agriculture hinterland where the Kingdom of Croatia had formed, and trade and political links with Zadar began to develop. Croatian settlers began to arrive by the 10th century, occupying all city classes, as well as important posts, like those of prior, judge, priest and others.

In 925, Tomislav, the Duke of the surrounding Croatian Dalmatia, united Croatian Dalmatia and Pannonia establishing the Croatian Kingdom.

Following the dynastic struggle between the descendants of king Stjepan Držislav after his death in 997, the city was besieged in 998 by the army of the Bulgarian emperor Samuel but managed to defend itself.

=== High Middle Ages ===
At the time of Zadar's medieval development, the city became a threat to Venice's ambitions, because of its strategic position at the centre of the eastern Adriatic coast.

In 998, Zadar sought Venetian protection against the Neretvian pirates. The Venetians were quick to fully exploit this opportunity: in 998 a fleet commanded by Doge Pietro Orseolo II, after having defeated pirates, landed on Korčula and Lastovo. Dalmatia was taken by surprise and offered little serious resistance. Trogir was the exception and was subjected to Venetian rule only after a bloody struggle, whereas Dubrovnik was forced to pay tribute.

Zadar citizens started to work for the full independence of Zadar and from the 1030s the city was formally a vassal of the Byzantine Empire. The head of this movement was the local patrician family – the Madi. Because of its wish of autonomy as a city-state, Zadar (Zara) came often in conflict with its hegemon, the Republic of Venice, which led to several, though poorly documented, rebellions. One of such rebellions occurred in 1049-1050, when the zaratini expelled the reigning Venetian count Orso Giustinian (Zustinian) and turned to king Petar Krešimir IV, leader of the Croatian state. The rebellion was however quickly quelled by Venetian doge Domenico Contarini, either the same year, or in 1062.

In 1105 or 1114, however, King Coloman of Hungary, having already annexed Croatia, occupied also Zadar and part of Dalmatia. The city returned to Venetian hands in 1116, but was again attacked the following year by a Hungarian army: the Venetian fleet, which had intervened to defend the possession, was repelled in a battle that cost the life of Doge Ordelafo Faliero himself. The peace of 1118, however, confirmed Venetian possession of the city.

In 1123, taking advantage of the absence of the Venetian fleet engaged in the East, Stephen II of Hungary occupied all of Venetian Dalmatia, including Biograd na Moru (Zaravecchia), but not Zadar. In 1125 the Venetian fleet, returning from the East, reoccupied Zadar and the other the lost cities, destroying Zaravecchia, which had put up resistance. In 1161, a discontent population again surrendered to Stephen III of Hungary. Venice's reaction was however immediate, and that same year Zadar was reconquered by Doge Vitale II Michiel. The Doge demanded an oath of fealty from all the people of Zadar capable of bearing arms and full submission to the patriarchal church of Grado, then leaving Domenico Morosini as count.

Venetian rule lasted until 1183, when the city passed again to the Kingdom of Hungary, handing itself over to Béla III. This episode caused the first war of Zadar (1183-1203), which, with alternating phases, dragged on for twenty years. During the brief period under Hungarian hegemony, the city enjoyed strong autonomy, entering into alliance agreements with the Republic of Pisa and the Kingdom of Sicily.

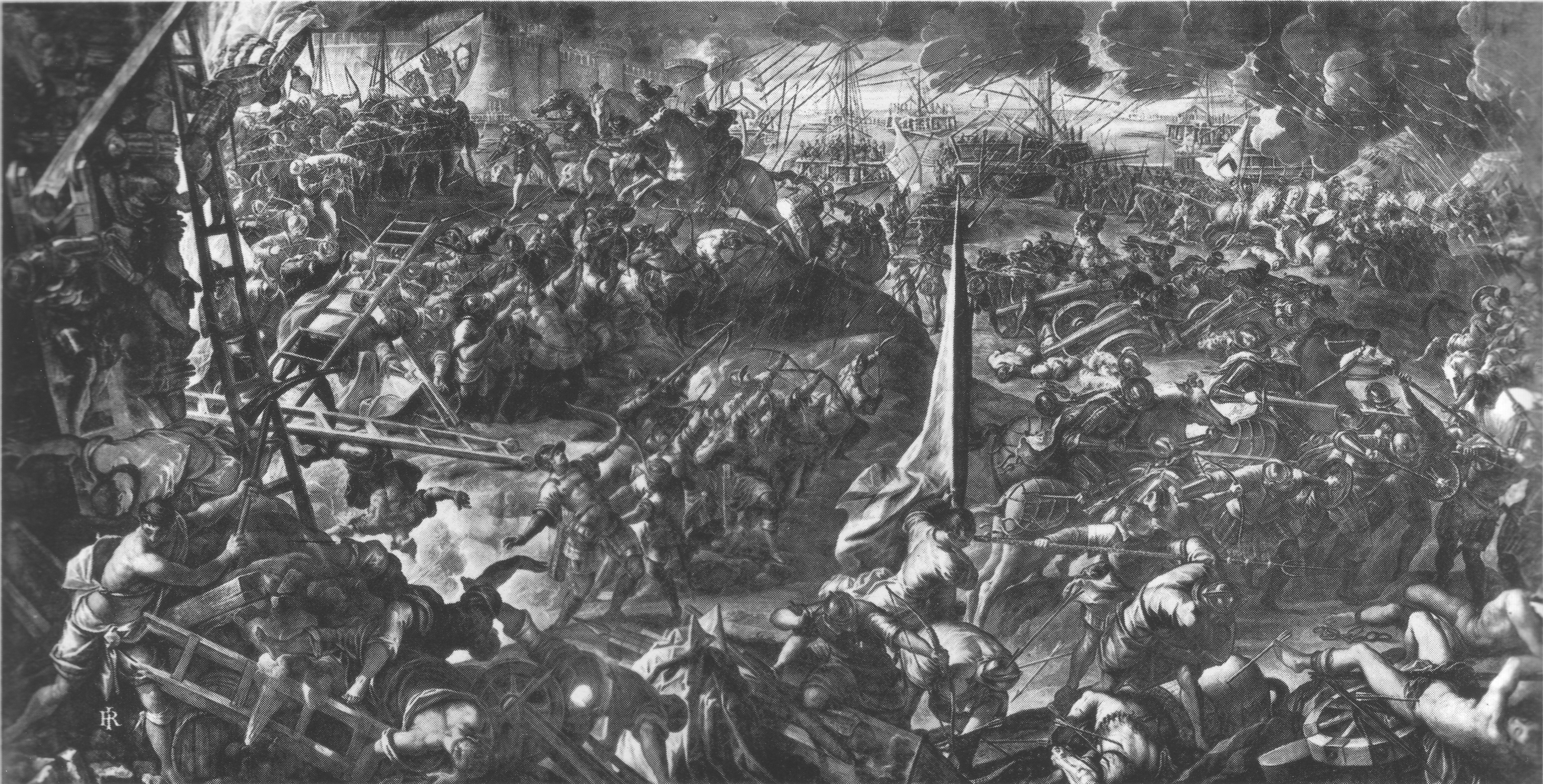
Siege of the city in 1202

The conflict ended in 1202 when Doge Enrico Dandolo used the crusaders, on their Fourth Crusade to Palestine, to lay siege to the city. The crusaders were obliged to pay Venice for sea transport to Egypt. As they were not able to produce enough money, the Venetians used them to initiate the Siege of Zadar, when the city was ransacked, demolished and robbed. Emeric, king of Croatia and Hungary, condemned the crusade, because of an argument about the possible heresy committed by God's army in attacking a Christian city. Nonetheless, Zadar was devastated and captured, with the population escaping into the surrounding countryside. Pope Innocent III excommunicated the Venetians and crusaders involved in the siege. According to Nada Klaić and Ivo Petricioli, the only profit which the Communal Council of Zadar derived from the re-establishment of Venetian authority was one third of the city's harbour taxes, probably insufficient even for the most indispensable communal needs. The city, aspiring to autonomy, rose up again in 1239, expelling Count Giovanni Michiel. However, it was quickly reconquered. Again in 1242, a new revolt forced Zadar into Hungarian hands, expelling Count Giovanni Michiel; but the following year Reniero Zeno's fleet retook it. This time Venice sent a colony of Venetians to the city to strengthen its control over the population. Michiel Morosini was appointed Count of Zadar. Yet another revolt broke out in 1311, leading to a new war. In 1312 the new doge, Marino Zorzi, sent a fleet against them, but the city was able to defend itself. In 1313 the siege resumed, and the people of Zadar finally chose to make new pacts of submission with Venice. In 1345 the city was pushed into yet another revolt by Louis I of Hungary, causing the outbreak of yet another war. The Hungarians were disastrously defeated in 1346 and the city passed again to Venice.

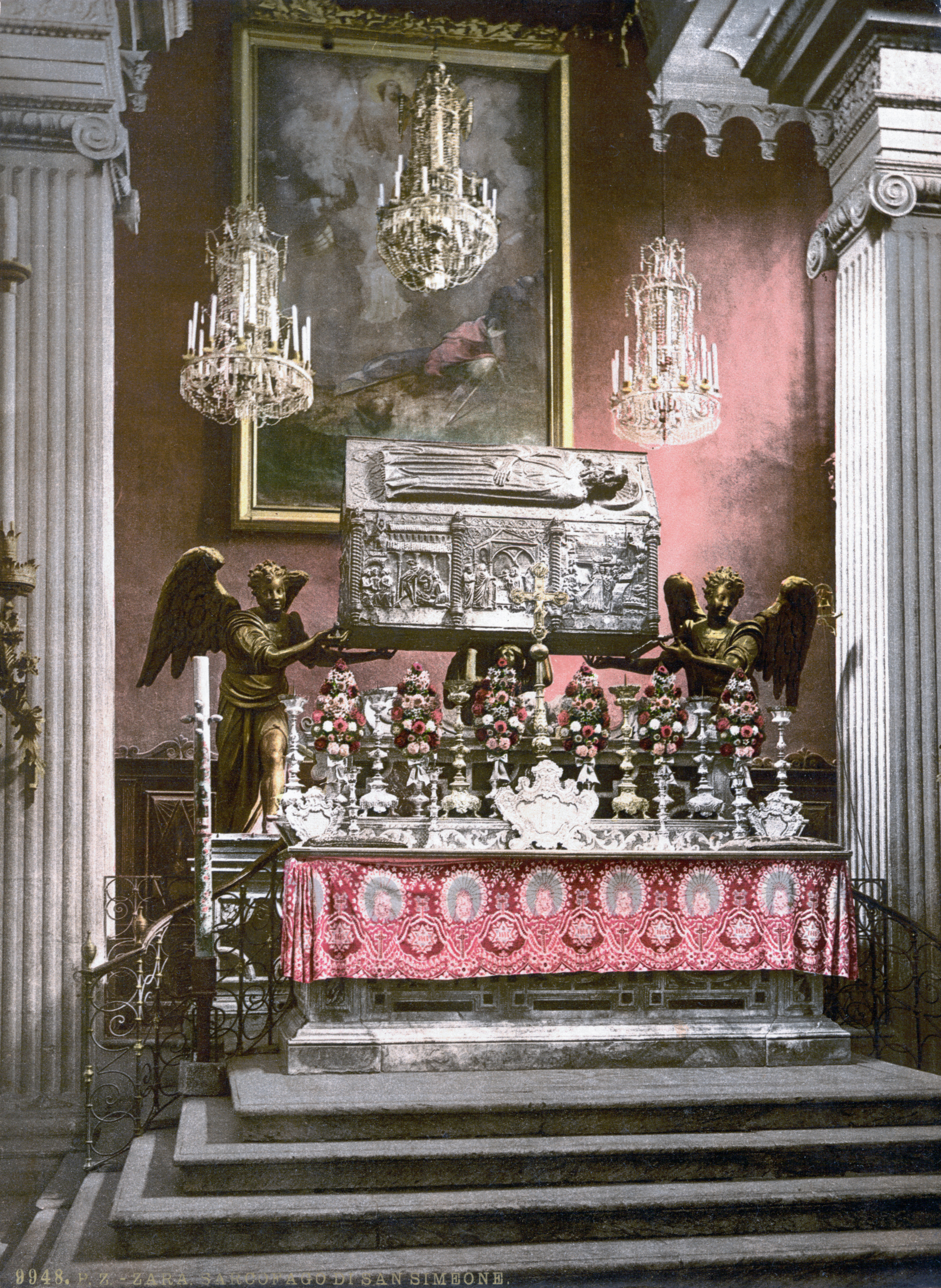
Chest of Saint Simeon photographed around 1900

This did not break the spirit of the city, however. Its commerce was suffering due to a lack of autonomy under Venice, while it enjoyed considerable autonomy under the much more feudal Kingdom of Hungary.

Louis I of Hungary, having declared war on Venice, conquered the city in 1357, and annexed it with the Treaty of Zadar, which forced Doge Giovanni Dolfin to renounce Venice's dominion over the city and all of Dalmatia. After the War of Chioggia between Genoa and Venice, Chioggia concluded on 14 March 1381 an alliance with Zadar and Trogir against Venice, and finally Chioggia became better protected by Venice in 1412, because in that year Šibenik (Sebenico) became the seat of the main customs office and the seat of the salt consumers office with a monopoly on the salt trade in Chioggia and on the whole Adriatic Sea. After the death of Louis, Zadar recognized the rule of king Sigismund, and after him, that of Ladislaus of Naples. During his reign the Kingdom of Hungary was enveloped in a bloody civil war. In 1409, Venice, seeing that Ladislaus was about to be defeated, and eager to exploit the situation despite its relative military weakness, offered to buy his "rights" on Dalmatia for a mere 100,000 ducats. Knowing he had lost the region in any case, Ladislaus accepted. Zadar was, thus sold back to the Venetians for a paltry sum.

According to Nada Klaić and Ivo Petricioli, the population of Zadar during the medieval period was "predominantly Croatian", according to numerous archival documents. Italian historians, on the other hand, stress how, during the Slavic and Avar invasions, the Italian, Romance-speaking population took refuge from the hinterland to the costal Dalmatian cities, such as Zadar, which became havens in which the Romance ethnicity and language were preserved. Carlo Tagliavini, writing for the Italian Encyclopaedia, claims that from the 12th century on, some historians of the Crusades, travellers, and others, speak of the "Latin" or "Romance" language of Dalmatia, namely Dalmatian, especially of four Dalmatian cities, one of which being Zadar. Though the Dalmatian language was threatened in Zadar by a strong Venetian influence already early on, Tagliavini reports that, nonetheless, the oldest document in the Dalmatian language comes indeed from Zadar, a letter dating from 1397. Presently there are in fact two letters in the Jadertine dialect, known as the lettere zaratine, one from 1325 and the one from 1397. Yet Italian historian Johannes Lucius, describing the history of the Dalmatian language, reports that in his time the oldest private document in Dalmatian came from Zadar, and dated from before 1300. Indeed, the documents from 14th century Zadar represent the most consistent and significant part of the Dalmatian-language corpus that has been preserved before the Jadertine dialect progressively merged with the rising Venetian dialect. Other private documents in Dalmatian from Zadar include the testament of a Nicola de Çadulin (1365) and the inventory of a Crisanu (1383), both recently published. Nada Klaić and Ivo Petricioli claim that In Zadar Croatian was used in liturgy, as shown by the writings of cardinal Boson, who followed Pope Alexander III en route to Venice in 1177. When the papal ships took shelter in the harbour of Zadar, the inhabitants greeted the Pope by singing lauds and canticles in a "Slavic tongue". Melchiorre Lucianović (Melkior Lucianović) points out that the fact that prayers in a Slavic language were chanted in a place in which "the Roman element existed", and that therefore also Slavic language liturgy was being used there, shows that the latter was definitely being used in the surrounding hinterland, and that the city of Zadar was not "exclusively Latin". Others have stressed that the appearance in Zadar of Slavic language prayers or chants in 1177 cannot be reasonably used as an argument to claim the city itself was Croatian.

Even though interspersed by sieges and destruction, the time between the 11th and 14th centuries was the golden age of Zadar. Thanks to its political and trading achievements, and also to its skilled seamen, Zadar played an important role among the cities on the east coast of the Adriatic. This affected its appearance and culture: many churches, rich monasteries and palaces for powerful families were built, together with the Chest of Saint Simeon. One of the best examples of the culture and prosperity of Zadar at that time was the founding of the University of Zadar, built in 1396 by the Dominican Order (the oldest university in present-day Croatia).

=== 15th to 18th centuries ===
Eastern Adriatic in 1558, with Venetian Dalmatia and Zadar

After the death of Louis I, Zadar came under the rule of Sigmund of Luxembourg and later Ladislaus of Naples, who, witnessing his loss of influence in Dalmatia, sold Zadar and his dynasty's rights to Dalmatia to Venice for 100,000 ducats on 31 July 1409. Venice therefore obtained control over Zadar without a fight, but was confronted by the resistance and tensions of important Zadar families. These attempts were met with persecution and confiscation. Zadar remained the administrative seat of Dalmatia, but this time under the rule of Venice, which expanded over the whole Dalmatia, except the Republic of Ragusa/Dubrovnik. During that time Giorgio da Sebenico, a renaissance sculptor and architect, famous for his work on the Cathedral of Šibenik, was born in Zadar. Other important people followed, such as Luciano and Francesco Laurana, known worldwide for their sculptures and buildings.

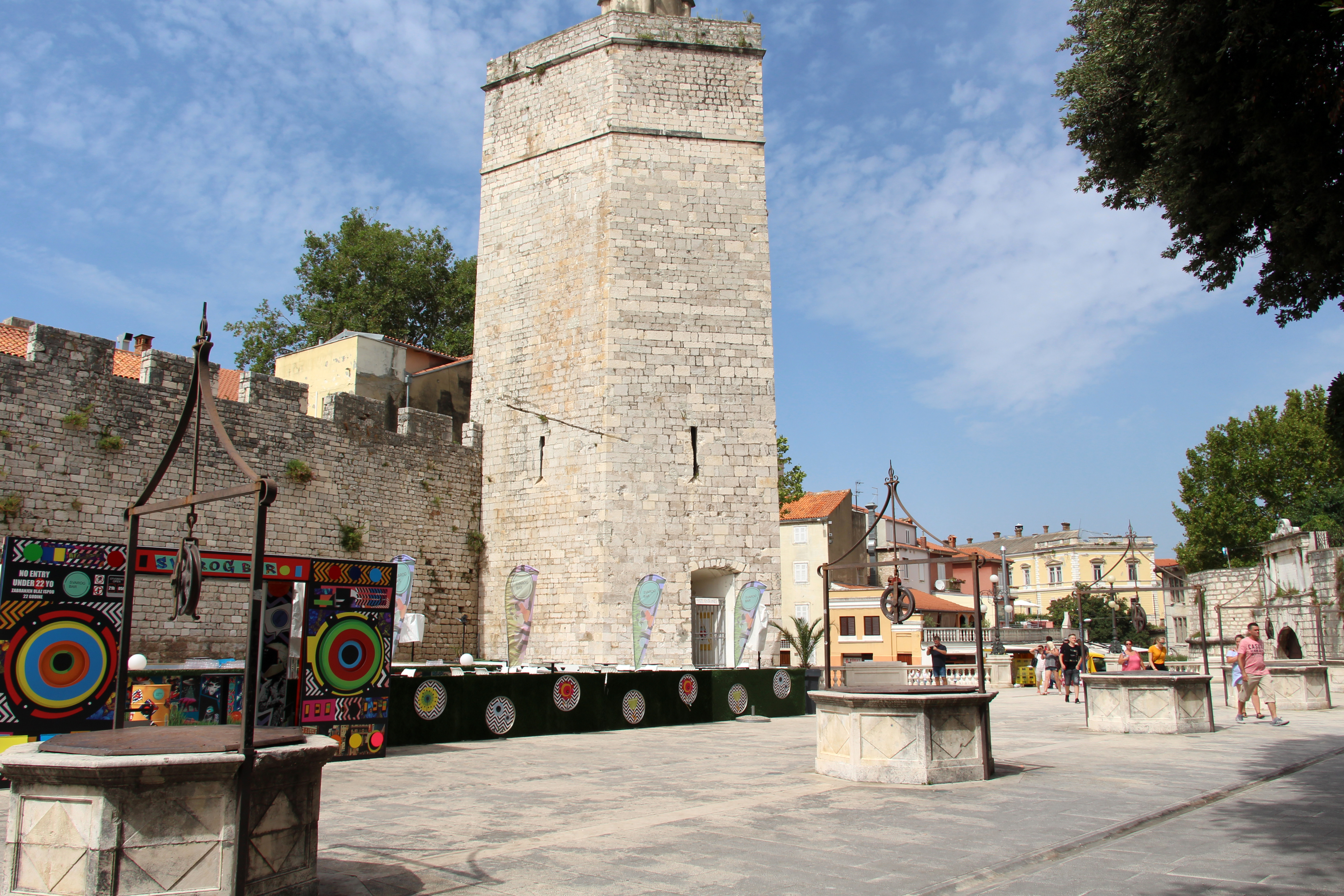
Captain's Tower is located on the Five Wells Square in the eponymous tower, part of the medieval fortifications of the city from the 13th century

The 16th and 17th centuries were noted in Zadar for Ottoman attacks. Ottomans captured the continental part of Zadar at the beginning of the 16th century and the city itself was all the time in the range of Turkish artillery. Due to that threat, the construction of a new system of castles and walls began. These defense systems changed the way the city looked. To make place for the pentagon castles many houses and churches were taken down, along with an entire suburb: Varoš of St. Martin. After the 40-year-long construction Zadar became the biggest fortified city in Dalmatia, empowered by a system of castles, bastions and canals filled with seawater. The city was supplied by the water from public city cisterns. During the complete makeover of Zadar, many new civic buildings were built, such as the City Lodge and City Guard on the Gospodski Square (Piazza dei Signori Square), several army barracks, but also some large new palaces.

In contrast to the insecurity and Ottoman sieges and destruction, an important culture evolved midst the city walls. During the 16th and the 17th centuries Zadar was still under the influence of the Renaissance, which had created an environment in which arts and literature could flourish, despite the ongoing conflicts outside the city walls. This period saw the rise of many important Italian Renaissance figures, such as the painters Giorgio Ventura and Andrea Meldolla, and the humanist scholar Giovanni Francesco Fortunio, who wrote the first Italian grammar book. Meanwhile, the activity of the Croatian writers and poets became prolific (Jerolim Vidolić, Petar Zoranić, Brne Karnarutić, Juraj Baraković, Šime Budinić).

During the continuous Ottoman danger the population stagnated by a significant degree along with the economy. During the 16th and 17th centuries several large-scale epidemics of bubonic plague erupted in the city. After more than 150 years of Turkish threat Zadar was not only scarce in population, but also in material wealth. Venice sent new colonists and, under the firm hand of archbishop Vicko Zmajević, the Arbanasi (Catholic Albanian refugees) settled in the city, forming a new suburb. Despite the shortage of money, the Teatro Nobile (lit., noble theater) was built in 1783. It functioned for over 100 years.

=== 19th and 20th centuries ===
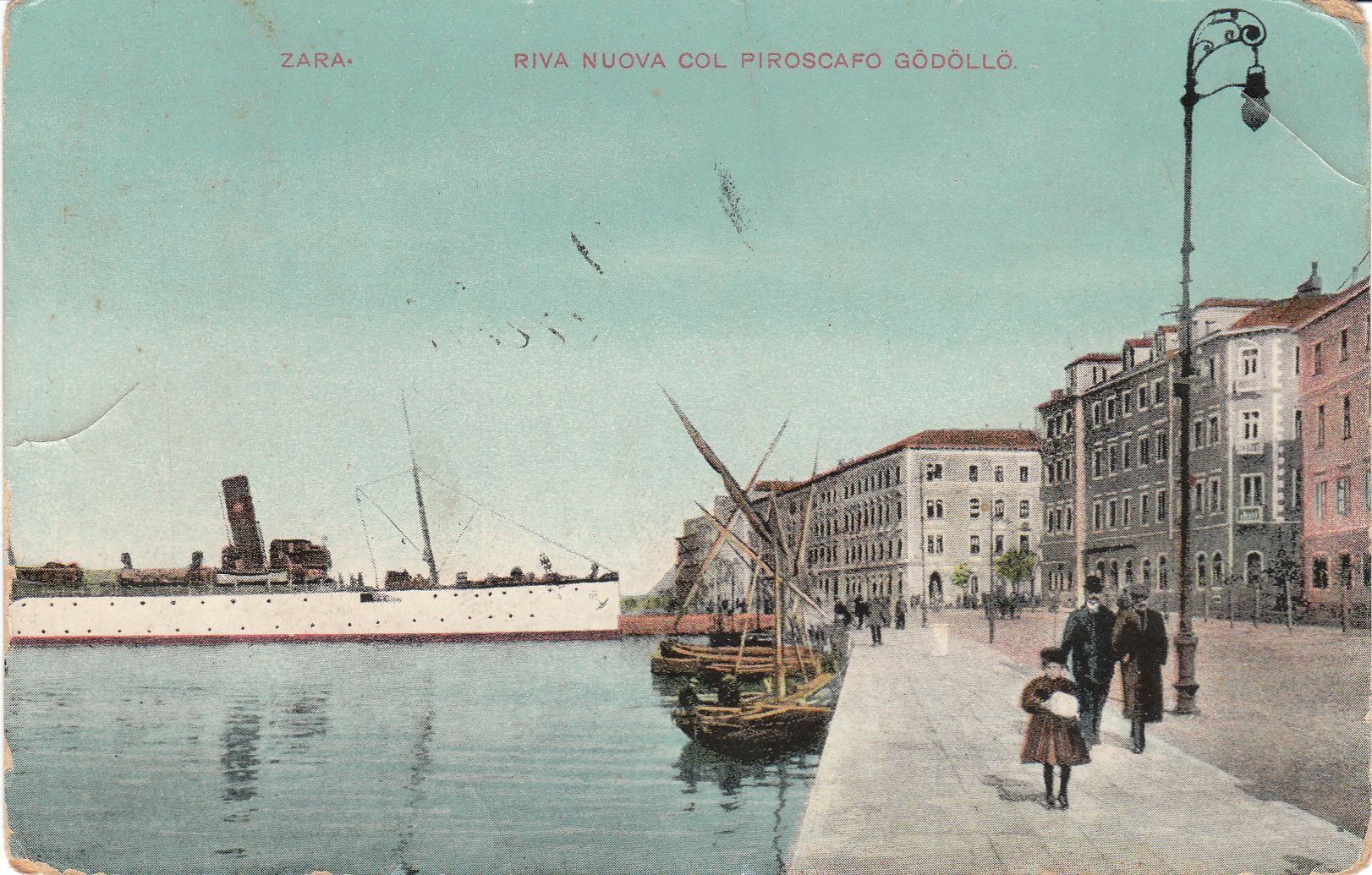
Zadar waterfront in 1909. Gödöllő steamboat can be seen in the distance

In 1797 with the Treaty of Campo Formio, the Republic of Venice, including Zadar, came under the Austrian crown. In 1806 it was briefly given to the Napoleonic Kingdom of Italy, until in 1809 it was added to the French Illyrian Provinces. In November 1813 an Austrian force blockaded the town with the assistance of two British Royal Navy frigates HMS Havannah and Weazle under the 3rd Earl of Cadogan. On 9 December the French garrison of Zadar capitulated, and by the end of the year all of Dalmatia was brought back under the control of the Austrian Empire. After the Congress of Vienna (1815) until 1918, the town (bilingual name Zara – Zadar) remained part of the Austrian monarchy (Austria side after the compromise of 1867), head of the district of the same name, one of the 13 Bezirkshauptmannschaften in Dalmatia. The Italian name of the city was officially used before 1867. It remained also the capital of Dalmatia province (Kronland).

Although during the first half of the 19th century the city population stagnated due to low natural increase, the city started to spread from the old center; citizens from the old city created the new suburb of Stanovi in the north.

During the second half of the 19th century, there was constant increase of population due to economic growth and immigration. Under the pressure of the population increase, the city continued to spread to Voštarnica and Arbanasi quarters, and the bridge in the city port was built. Except being the administrative center of the province, agriculture, industry of liqueurs and trade were developed, many brotherhoods were established, similar to the Central European trade guilds. The southern city walls were torn down, new coastal facilities were built and Zadar became an open port. As the city developed economically, it developed culturally. A large number of printshops, new libraries, archives, and theatres sprung up. At the end of the 19th century there was also a stronger industrial development, with 27 small or big factories before World War I.

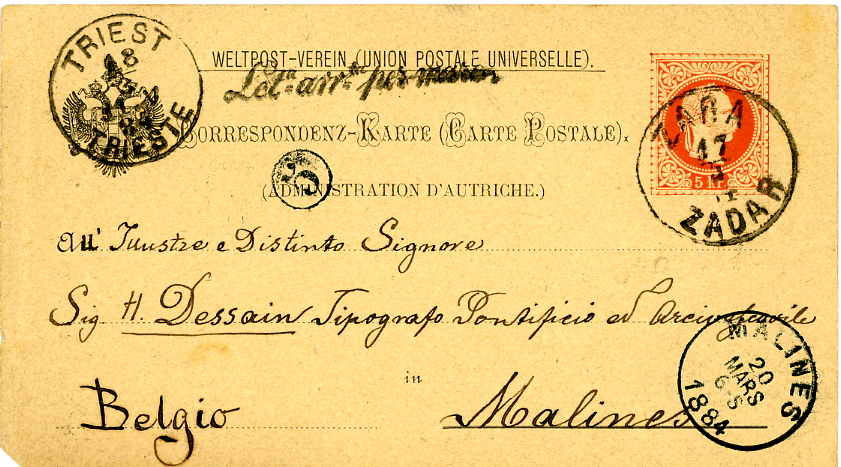
5-kreuzer KK postal card cancelled bilingual ZARA-ZADAR and TRIEST-TRIESTE in 1884 with Italian postmark Let(tera).arr(ivata). per mare

After 1848, Italian and Croatian nationalistic ideas arrived in the city, which became divided between the Croats and the Italians, both of whom founded their respective political parties.

There are conflicting sources for both sides claiming to have formed the majority in Zadar in this period. The archives of the official Austro-Hungarian censuses conducted around the end of 19th century show that Italian was the primary language spoken by the majority of the people in the city (9,018 Italians and 2,551 Croatians in 1900), but only by a third of the population in the entire county (9,234 vs. 21,753 the same year).

During the 19th century, the conflict between Zadar's Italian and Croatian communities grew in intensity and changed its nature. Until the beginning of the century it had been of moderate intensity and mainly of a class nature (under Venetian rule the Italians were employed in the most profitable activities, such as trade and administration). With the development of the modern concept of national identity across Europe, national conflicts started to mark the political life of Zadar.

During the second part of the 19th century, Zadar was subject to the same policy enacted by the Austrian Empire in South-Tyrol, the Austrian Littoral and Dalmatia and consisting in fostering the local German or Croatian culture at the expense of the Italian. In Zadar and generally throughout Dalmatia, the Austrian policy had the objective to reduce the possibility of any future territorial claim by the Kingdom of Italy.

=== Italy (1918–1947) ===
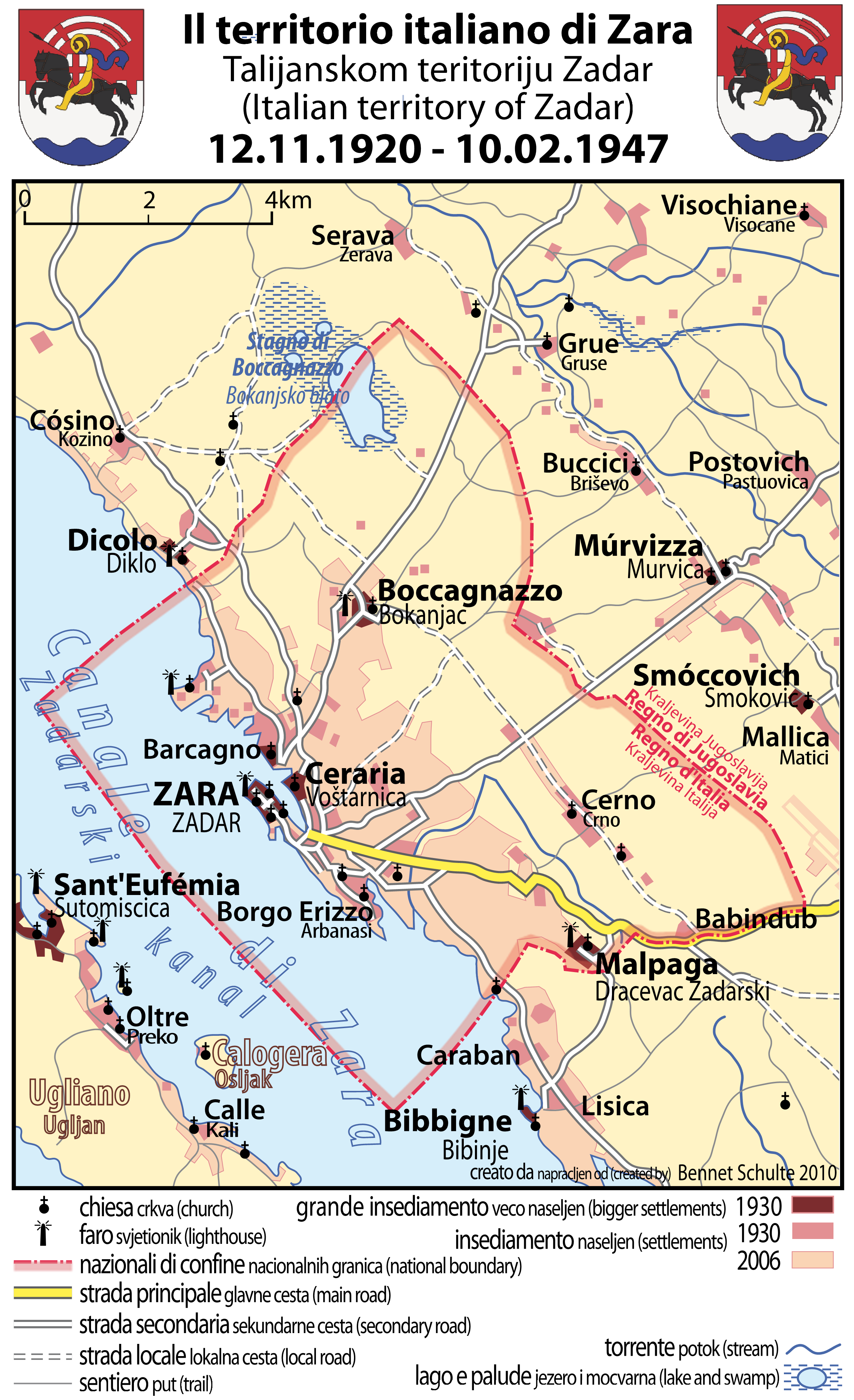
Italian territory of Zara 1920–1947

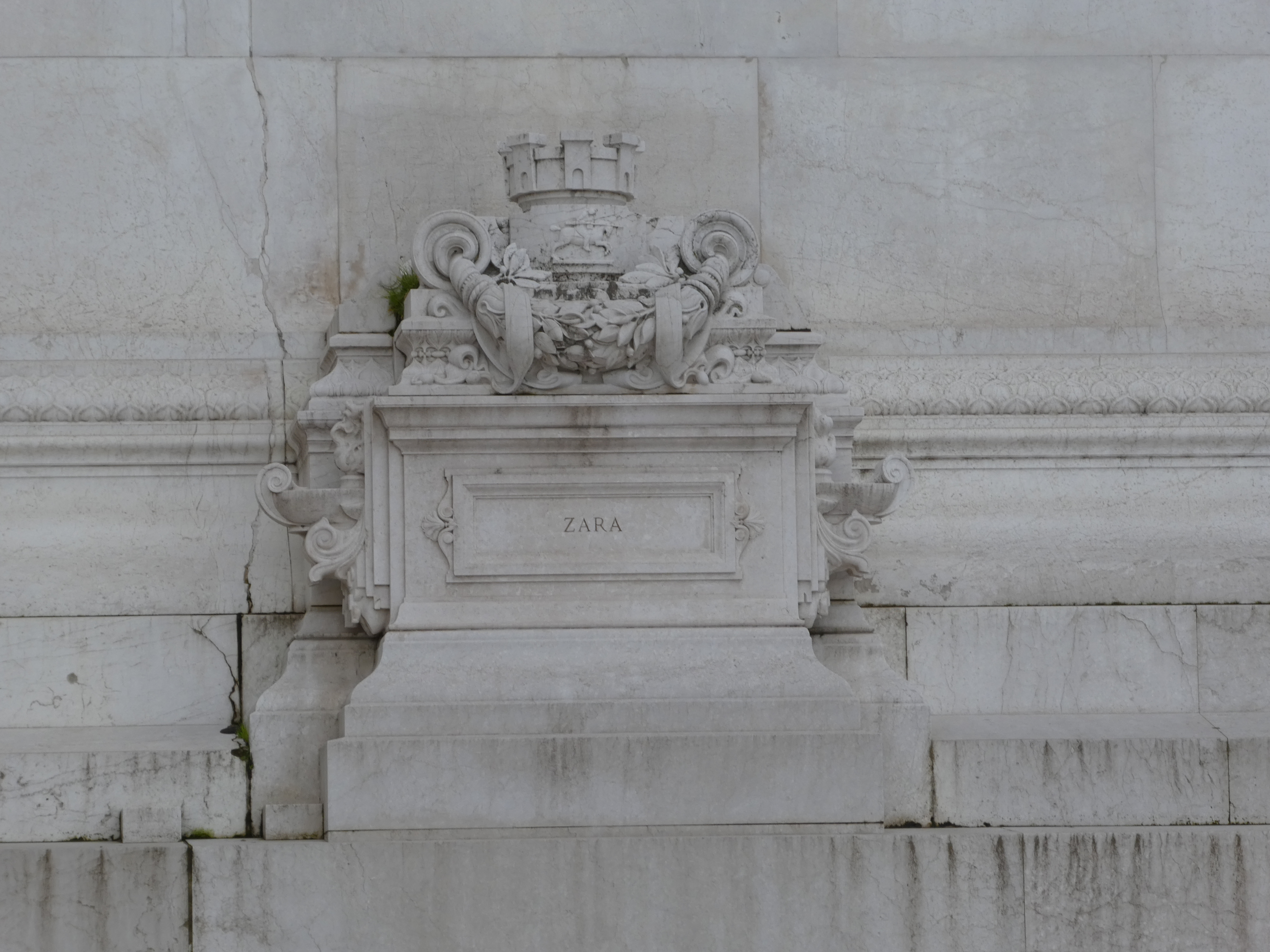
Altar of the city of Zara at the Altare della Patria in Rome, Italy. Zara was at the time a so-called "redeemed lands"

In 1915, Italy entered World War I under the provisions set in the Treaty of London. In exchange for its participation with the Triple Entente and in the event of victory, Italy was to obtain territory in northern Dalmatia including Zadar, Šibenik and most of the Dalmatian islands, except for Krk and Rab. At the end of the war, Italian military forces invaded Dalmatia and seized control of Zara, with Admiral Enrico Millo being proclaimed the governor of Dalmatia. The well-known Italian nationalist Gabriele d'Annunzio supported the seizure of Dalmatia, and proceeded to Zadar in an Italian warship in December 1918.

During 1918, political life in Zadar intensified. The collapse of the Austro-Hungarian monarchy led to the renewal of national conflicts in the city. With the arrival of an Italian army of occupation in the city on 4 November 1918 within the framework of allied occupation of the eastern Adriatic, the Italian faction gradually assumed control, a process which was completed on 5 December when it took over the governorship. With the Treaty of Versailles (10 January 1920) Italian claims on Dalmatia contained in the Treaty of London were nullified, but later on the agreements between the Kingdom of Italy and the Kingdom of Serbs, Croats and Slovenes set in the Treaty of Rapallo (12 November 1920) gave Zadar with other small local territories to Italy.

The Zadar enclave, a total of 104 square kilometres (40 square miles), included the city of Zadar, the municipalities of Bokanjac, Arbanasi, Crno, part of Diklo (a total of 51 km^{2} of territory and 17,065 inhabitants) and the islands of Lastovo and Palagruža (53 square kilometres (20 square miles), 1,710 inhabitants). The territory was organized into a small Italian province, the province of Zara. According to the 1921 census, in the comune of Zara there were 12,283 Dalmatian Italians, who made up 66% of the population, compared to 11,552 in 1910, when they constituted 32% of the population.

=== World War II ===
Germany, Italy, and other Axis powers, invaded the Kingdom of Yugoslavia on 6 April 1941. Zadar held a force of 9,000 and was one of the starting points of the invasion. The force reached Šibenik and Split on 15 April (2 days before surrender). Civilians were previously evacuated to Ancona and Pula. Occupying Mostar and Dubrovnik, on 17 April they met invading troops that had started out from Italian-occupied Albania. On 17 April the Yugoslav government surrendered, faced with the Wehrmacht's overwhelming superiority.

Mussolini required the newly formed Nazi puppet-state, the so-called Independent State of Croatia (NDH) to hand over almost all of Dalmatia (including Split) to Italy under the Rome Treaties.

The city became the center of a new Italian territorial entity, the Governorate of Dalmatia, including the enlarged province of Zara (now Zadar), the province of Cattaro (now Kotor), and the province of Spalato (Split).

Under Italian rule, the Croats were subjected to a policy of forced assimilation. This created immense resentment among the Yugoslav people. The Yugoslav Partisan movement took root in Zadar, even though more than 70% of the population of Zadar was Italian.

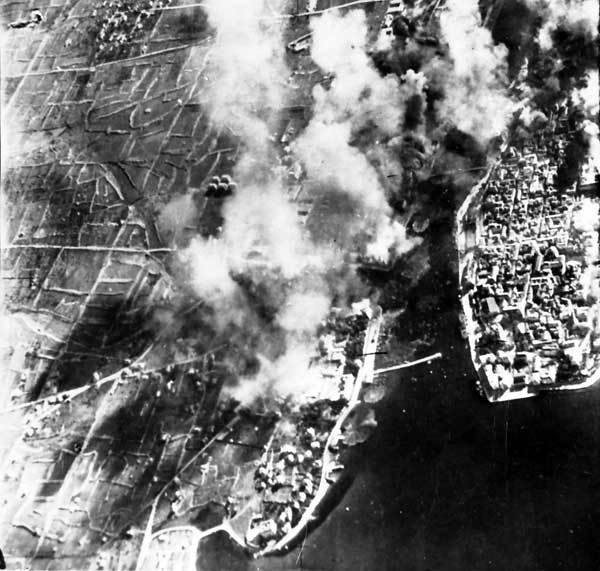
Bombing of Zadar in World War II by the Allies

After Mussolini was removed from power on 25 July 1943, Italy signed an armistice with the Allies, which was announced on 8 September 1943, and the Italian army collapsed. Then on 12 September 1943, Mussolini was rescued by the Germans, and formed the Nazi-puppet Italian Social Republic. German troops (114th Jäger Division) entered Zadar on 10 September and took over. This avoided a temporary liberation by Partisans in September 1943, as was the case in Split, Trogir and Šibenik. Zadar was placed under the control of the Italian Social Republic.

The NDH proclaimed the Treaty of Rome to be void and occupied Dalmatia with German support but the NDH was prevented from taking over Zadar on the grounds that Zadar itself was not subject to the conditions of the 1941 Treaty of Rome. Despite this, NDH leader Ante Pavelić designated Zadar as the capital of the Sidraga-Ravni Kotari County, although the county administrator could not enter the city.

During World War II, Zadar was bombed by the Allies, from November 1943 to October 1944. Estimated fatalities range from under 1,000, up to as many as 4,000 of the city's 20,000 inhabitants. Over the course of the bombing, 80% of the city's buildings were destroyed. Zadar has been called the "Dresden of the Adriatic" because of perceived similarities to the Allied bombing of Dresden.

In late October 1944, the German army and most of the Italian civilian administration abandoned the city, except the Vice Prefect Giacomo Vuxani. On 31 October 1944, the Partisans seized the city, until then a part of Mussolini's Italian Social Republic. At the start of World War II, Zadar had a population of 24,000; by the end of 1944, this had decreased to 6,000. Though controlled by the Partisans, Zadar remained under nominal Italian sovereignty until the Paris Peace Treaties that took effect on 15 September 1947. After the war Dalmatian Italians of Zadar left Yugoslavia towards Italy (Istrian–Dalmatian exodus).

=== SFR Yugoslavia (1947–1991) ===
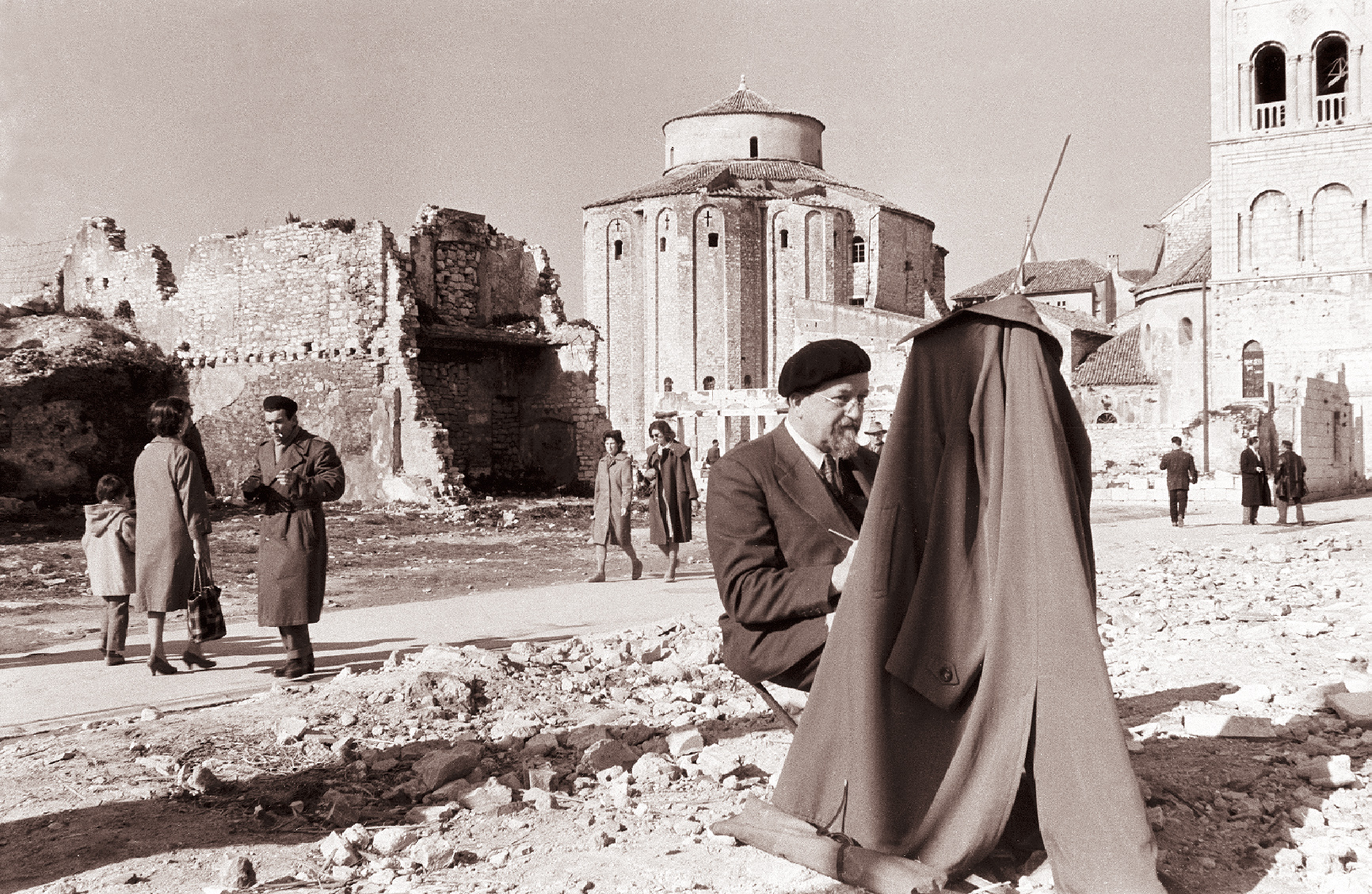
Painter Božidar Jakac at the destroyed Zadar Forum, 1961

In 1947, Zadar became part of the Socialist Federal Republic of Yugoslavia and the Socialist Republic of Croatia. In the first decade after the war, the city's population increase was slow and still did not reach its pre-war numbers. The Italian exodus from the city continued and in a few years was almost total. It is estimated that around 10,000 Italians emigrated from Zadar. In October 1953, the last Italian schools in the area were closed. Today the Italian community counts only a few hundred people, gathered into a local community (Comunità degli Italiani di Zara).

The city recorded a large population increase in the late 1950s and the 1960s, mainly due to immigration as the government encouraged migration from rural areas to urban centers and their industrial development. Construction of the Adriatic Highway, railway and civil airport contributed to the development of tourism and the accessibility of Zadar. Population growth slowed down in the following decades. In the late 1980s, due to the economic crisis in Yugoslavia, Zadar's economy began stagnating.

=== Croatian War of Independence (1991–1995) ===
In 1990, Serb separatists from Dalmatian Hinterland sealed roads and effectively blocked Dalmatia from the rest of Croatia during the Log Revolution. In March 1991, the Croatian War of Independence broke out. It affected Zadar and its surroundings. A number of non-Serbs were expelled from the area and several Croatian policemen were killed resulting in the 1991 anti-Serb riot in Zadar. Serbs at that time accounted for about 14% of the population.

The Yugoslav People's Army (JNA) and forces of the SAO Krajina occupied parts of Zadar's hinterland, converged on the city and subjected it to artillery bombardment during the Battle of Zadar. Along with other Croatian towns in the area, Serb forces shelled Zadar sporadically, damaging buildings and homes as well as UNESCO protected sites. Serb forces also attacked a number of nearby towns and villages, the most brutal attack being the Škabrnja massacre in which Krajina Territorial Defense troops killed 62 Croatian civilians and five prisoners of war.

Land connections with Zagreb were severed for over a year. The only link between the north and south of the country was via the island of Pag. The siege of the city lasted from 1991 until January 1993 when Zadar and the surrounding area came under the control of Croatian forces and the bridge link with the rest of Croatia was reestablished in Operation Maslenica. Attacks on the city continued until the end of the war in 1995.

Some of the countryside along the No. 8 highway running north east is still sectioned off due to land mines.

== Geography ==
Zadar is settled in northern Dalmatia, facing the islands of Ugljan and Pašman (part of the Zadar Archipelago), from which it is separated by the narrow Zadar Strait. The promontory on which the old city stands used to be separated from the mainland by a deep moat which has since been filled. The harbour, to the north-east of the town, is safe and spacious.

=== Climate ===
Zadar has a borderline humid subtropical (Cfa) and Mediterranean climate (Csa). Zadar has mild, wet winters and very warm, humid summers. July and August are the hottest months, with an average high temperature around 29–30 °C (84–86 °F). The highest temperature ever was 40.0 °C (104.0 °F) on 5 August 2017 at the Zadar Zemunik station (records since 1981) and 39.0 °C (102.2 °F) at the old Zadar climate station on 6 August 2022 (records since 1961). Temperatures can consistently reach over 30 °C (86 °F) during the summer months, but during spring and autumn may also reach 30 °C almost every year. Temperatures below 0 °C (32 °F) are rare, and are not maintained for more than a few days. January is the coldest month, with an average temperature around 7.7 °C (46 °F). The lowest temperature ever recorded in Zadar was −12.0 °C (10.4 °F) on 28 February 2018 at the Zadar Zemunik weather station and −9.1 °C (15.6 °F) on 23 January 1963 at the old Zadar climate station. Through July and August temperature has never dropped below 10 °C (50 °F). October and November are the wettest months, with a total precipitation of about 114 and 119 mm (4.49 and 4.69 in), respectively. July is the driest month, with a total precipitation of around 35 mm (1.38 in). Winter is the wettest season, however it can rain in Zadar at any time of the year. Snow is exceedingly rare, but it may fall in December, January, February and much more rarely in March. On average Zadar has 1.4 days of snow a year, but it is more likely that there isn’t snow. The sea temperature goes from 10 °C (50 °F) in February to 25 °C (77 °F) in July and August, but it is possible to swim from May to October, sometimes even until November. Sometimes, in February, the sea temperature can drop to 7 °C (45 °F) and, in July, it can exceed 29 °C (84 °F).

Since records began in 1961, the highest temperature recorded at the local weather station at an elevation of 5 metres (16 ft) was 36.3 °C (97.3 °F), on 4 August 2017. The coldest temperature was −9.1 °C (15.6 °F), on 23 January 1963.

Climate data for Zadar (Puntamika Borik) 1971–2000, extremes 1961–2020
Month	Jan	Feb	Mar	Apr	May	Jun	Jul	Aug	Sep	Oct	Nov	Dec	Year
Record high °C (°F)	17.4 (63.3)	21.2 (70.2)	22.5 (72.5)	26.5 (79.7)	32.0 (89.6)	35.3 (95.5)	36.2 (97.2)	39.0 (102.2)	35.2 (95.4)	27.2 (81.0)	25.0 (77.0)	18.9 (66.0)	39.0 (102.2)
Mean daily maximum °C (°F)	10.8 (51.4)	11.3 (52.3)	13.6 (56.5)	16.6 (61.9)	21.3 (70.3)	25.2 (77.4)	28.2 (82.8)	28.2 (82.8)	24.3 (75.7)	20.0 (68.0)	15.1 (59.2)	11.9 (53.4)	18.9 (66.0)
Daily mean °C (°F)	7.3 (45.1)	7.5 (45.5)	9.7 (49.5)	12.9 (55.2)	17.5 (63.5)	21.3 (70.3)	23.9 (75.0)	23.7 (74.7)	19.9 (67.8)	15.9 (60.6)	11.4 (52.5)	8.5 (47.3)	14.9 (58.8)
Mean daily minimum °C (°F)	4.3 (39.7)	4.3 (39.7)	6.3 (43.3)	9.3 (48.7)	13.5 (56.3)	17.0 (62.6)	19.3 (66.7)	19.3 (66.7)	16.0 (60.8)	12.5 (54.5)	8.3 (46.9)	5.5 (41.9)	11.3 (52.3)
Record low °C (°F)	−9.1 (15.6)	−6.4 (20.5)	−6.8 (19.8)	0.5 (32.9)	3.4 (38.1)	8.2 (46.8)	12.7 (54.9)	11.5 (52.7)	8.0 (46.4)	2.3 (36.1)	−1.8 (28.8)	−6.5 (20.3)	−9.1 (15.6)
Average precipitation mm (inches)	72.6 (2.86)	62.5 (2.46)	63.5 (2.50)	70.0 (2.76)	64.7 (2.55)	54.4 (2.14)	30.4 (1.20)	49.6 (1.95)	104.0 (4.09)	106.7 (4.20)	105.6 (4.16)	95.2 (3.75)	879.2 (34.61)
Average precipitation days (≥ 0.1 mm)	10.0	8.5	8.9	10.4	9.5	8.2	5.3	5.9	8.7	9.8	11.2	10.4	106.8
Average snowy days (≥ 1.0 cm)	0.5	0.2	0.1	0.0	0.0	0.0	0.0	0.0	0.0	0.0	0.0	0.2	1.1
Average relative humidity (%)	72.4	70.0	71.2	72.7	73.8	71.2	67.2	69.3	73.4	73.8	73.5	72.8	71.8
Mean monthly sunshine hours	114.7	146.9	186.0	207.0	275.9	303.0	350.3	322.4	246.0	182.9	123.0	108.5	2,566.6
Source: Croatian Meteorological and Hydrological Service

Around 9:15 on 22 December 2019, a waterspout of intensity IF1 made landfall between the Ričine and Arbanasi, Zadar quarters of Zadar, felling trees and knocking roof tiles onto cars.

== Main sights ==
The main sites of the city

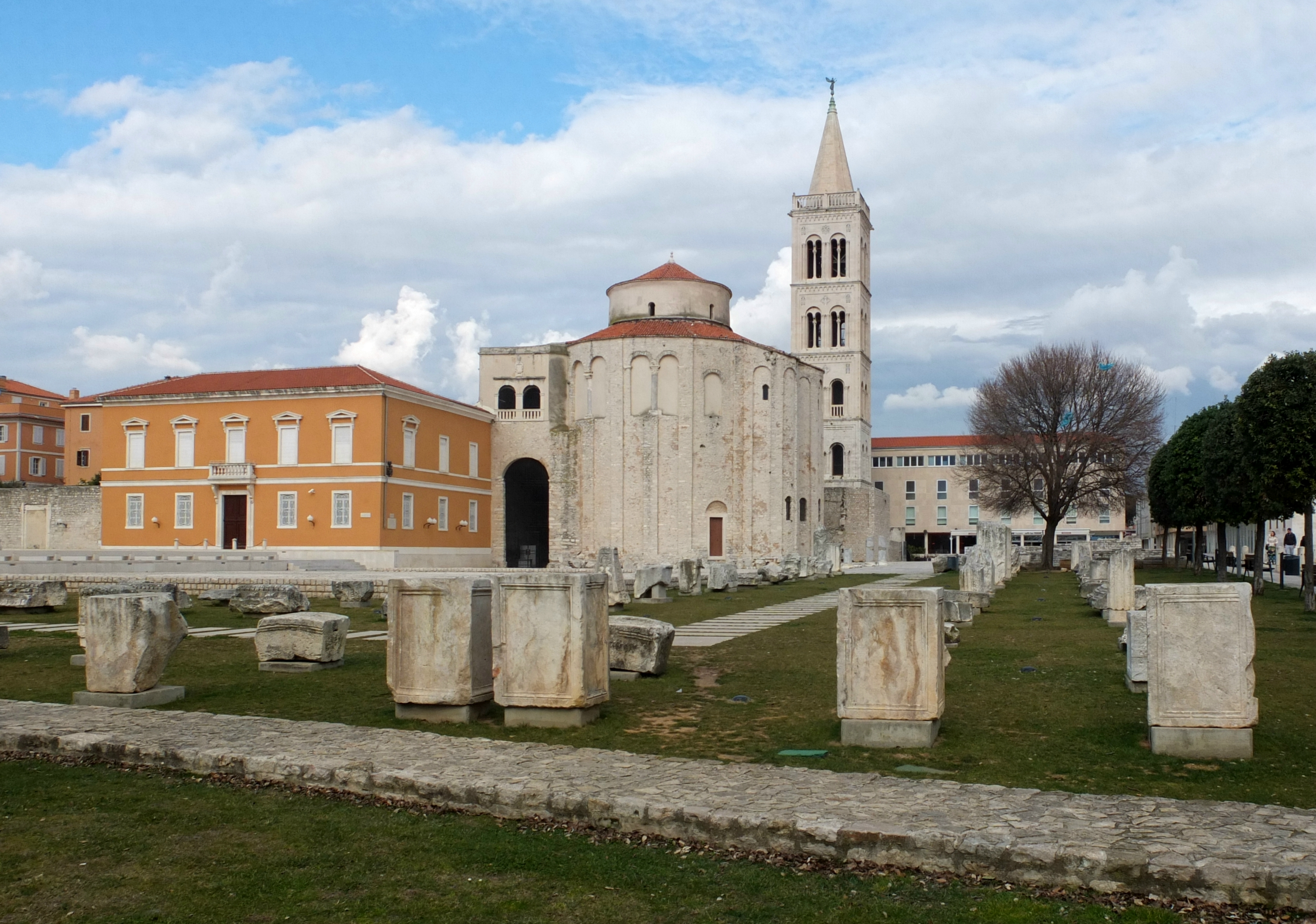
Roman Forum

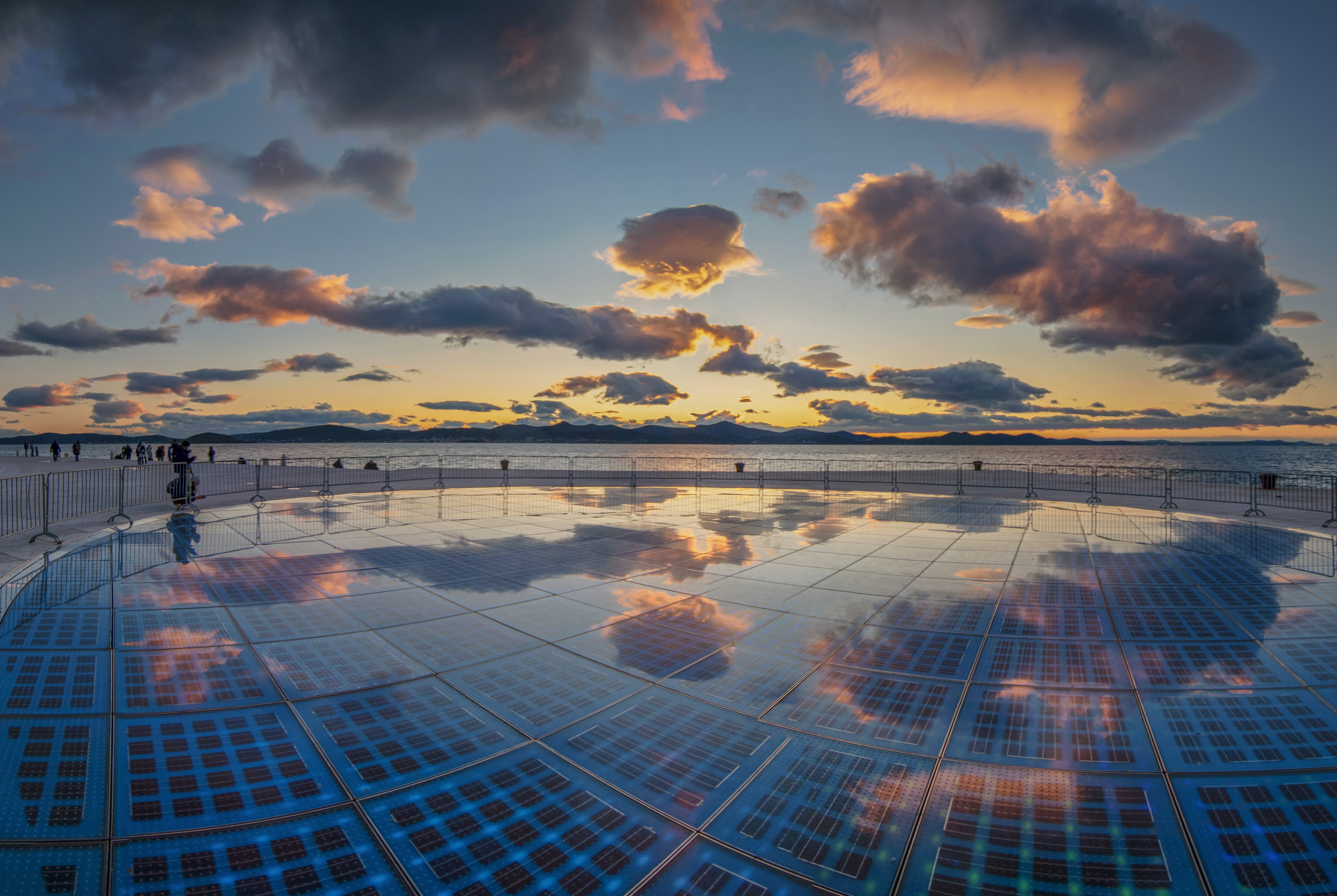
Monument to the Sun at sunset. The sunset in Zadar was famously described by English filmmaker Alfred Hitchcock, who stated during his visit in May 1964 that “Zadar has the most beautiful sunset in the world.”

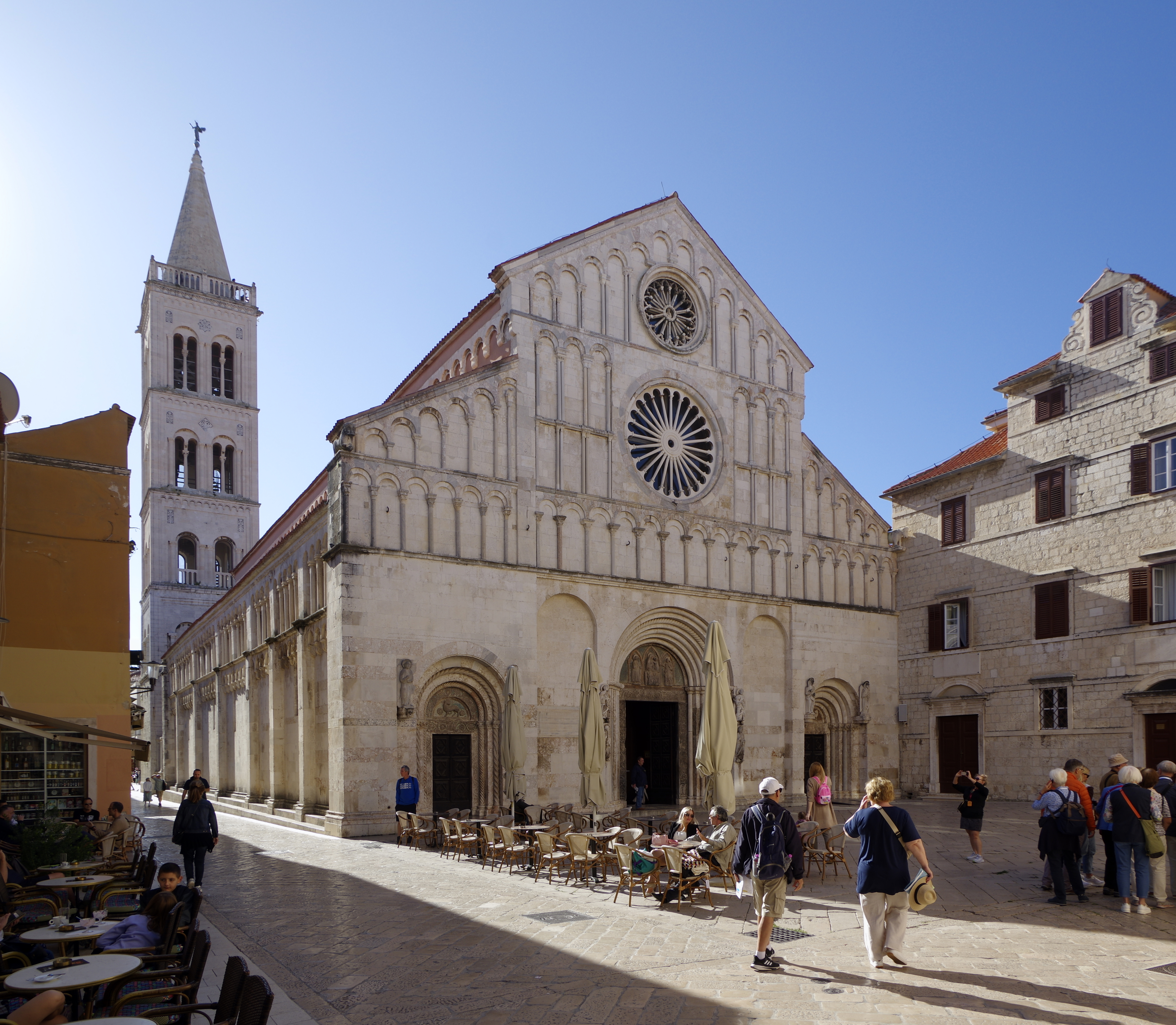
Cathedral of St. Anastasia

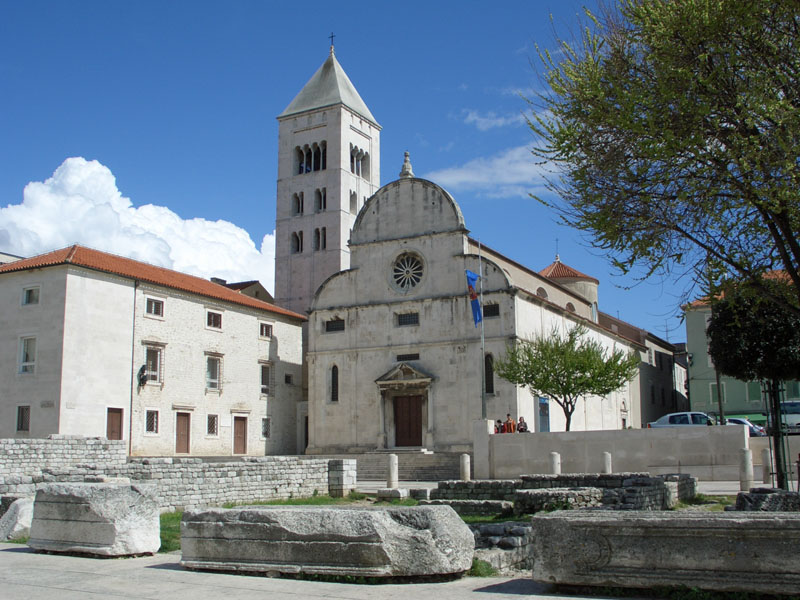
St. Mary's Church, located in the old city opposite St. Donatus' Church

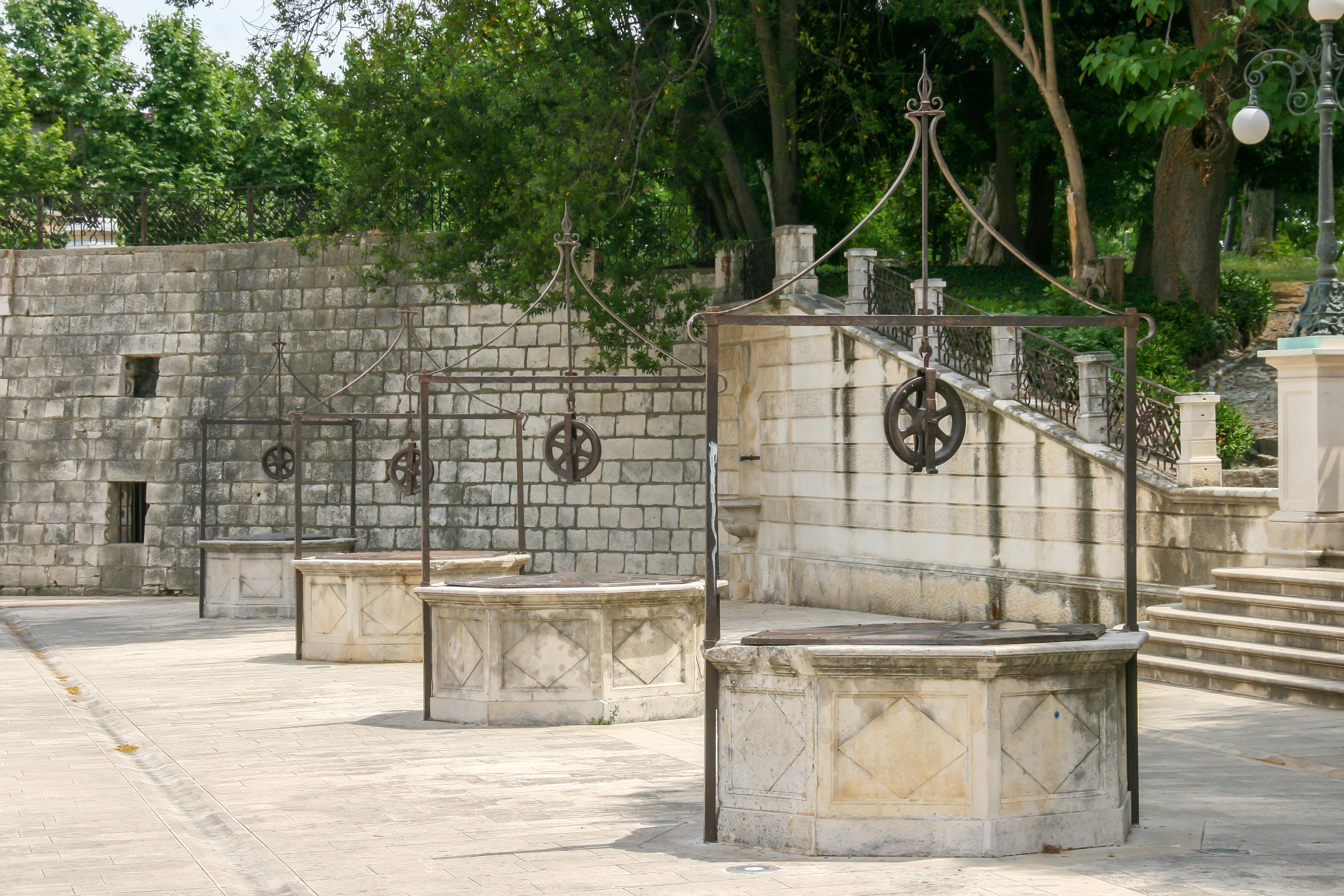
Five Wells Square

=== Architecture ===
Zadar gained its urban structure in Roman times; during the time of Julius Caesar and Emperor Augustus, the town was fortified and the city walls with towers and gates were built. On the western side of the town were the forum, the basilica and the temple, while outside the town were the amphitheatre and cemeteries. The aqueduct which supplied the town with water is partially preserved. Inside the ancient town, a medieval town had developed with a series of churches and monasteries being built.

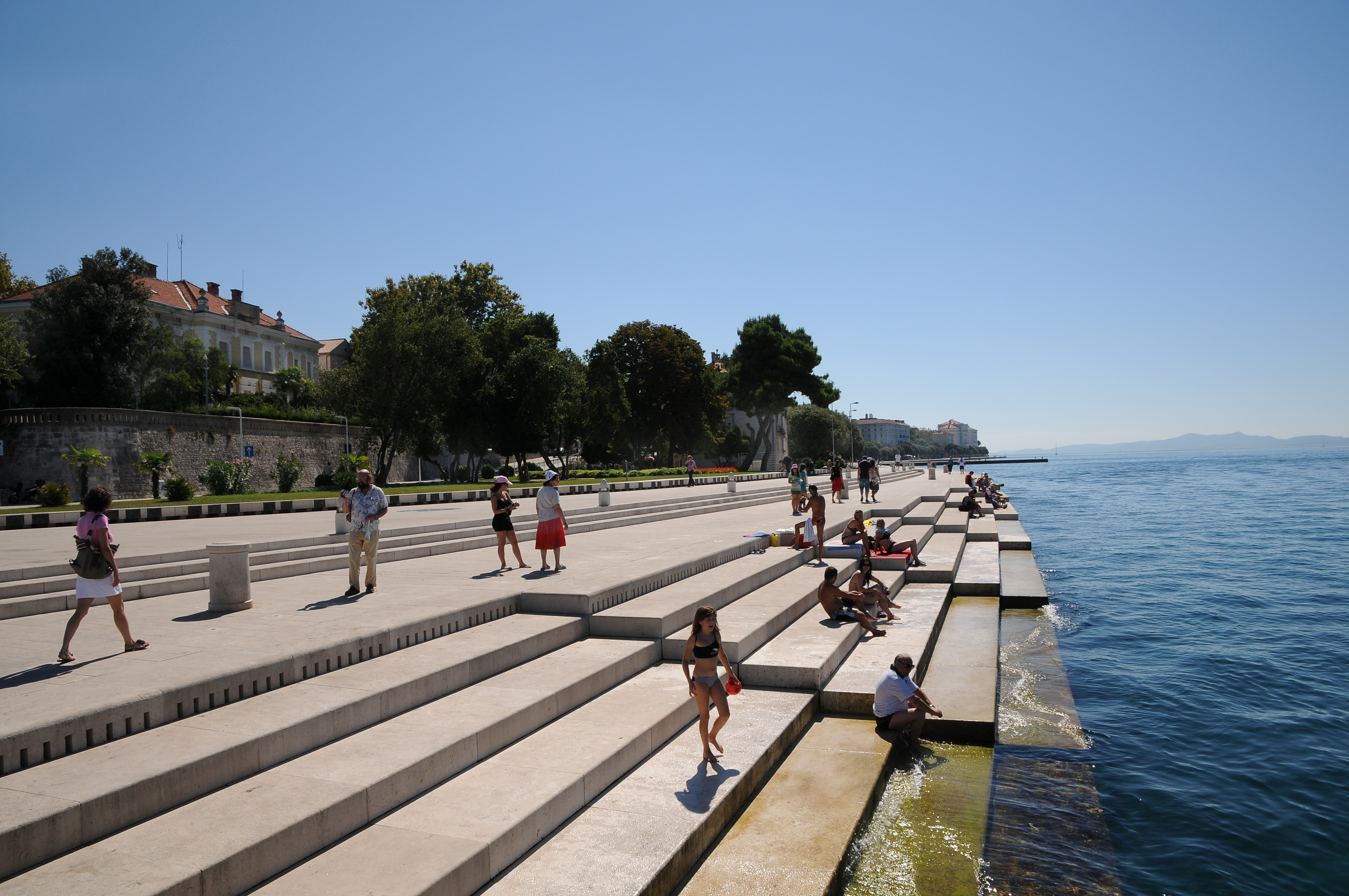
Sea Organ (Croatian: Morske Orgulje), an architectural sound installation that produces music through the interaction of sea waves with a system of pipes installed beneath a series of large marble steps

During the Middle Ages, Zadar fully gained its urban aspect, which has been maintained until today. In the first half of the 16th century, Venice fortified the town with a new system of defensive walls on the side facing land. In the course of the century architectural building in the Renaissance style was continued and defensive trenches (Foša) were also built. They were completely buried during the Italian occupation until 1873 when, under Austrian rule, the ramparts of Zadar were converted from fortifications into elevated promenades commanding extensive seaward and landward views, thus being the wall lines preserved; of its four old gates, one, the Porta Marina, incorporates the relics of a Roman arch, and another, the Porta di Terraferma, was designed in the 16th century by the Veronese artist Michele Sanmicheli. In the bombardments during World War II entire blocks were destroyed but some structures survived.

Most important landmarks include:

- Roman Forum – the largest on the eastern side of the Adriatic, founded by the first Roman Emperor Augustus, as shown by two stone inscriptions about its completion dating from the 3rd century.
- Most Roman remains were used in the construction of the fortifications, but two squares are embellished with lofty marble columns; a Roman tower stands on the eastern side of the town; and some remains of a Roman aqueduct may be seen outside the ramparts.
- Church of St. Donatus – a monumental round building from the 9th century in pre-Romanesque style, traditionally but erroneously said to have been erected on the site of a temple of Juno. It is the most important preserved structure of its period in Dalmatia; the massive dome of the rotunda is surrounded by a vaulted gallery in two stories which also extends around the three apses to the east. The church treasury contains some of the finest Dalmatian metalwork; notably the pastoral staff of Bishop Valaresso (1460).
- St. Anastasia's Cathedral (Croatian: Sv. Stošija), basilica in Romanesque style built in the 12th to 13th century (high Romanesque style), the largest cathedral in Dalmatia.
- Churches of St. Chrysogonus and St. Simeon are also architectural examples in the Romanesque style. The latter houses the ark or reliquary of St. Simeon (1380), made in gilted silver by Francesco Antonio da Milano under commission of Queen Elizabeth of Bosnia.
- St Chrysogonus's Church – monumental Romanesque church of very fine proportions and refined Romanesque ornaments.
- St Elijah's Church (Croatian: Sv. Ilija)
- St Francis' Church – Gothic styled church, site of the signing of the Zadar Peace Treaty 1358. Its choir is home to several carved stalls, executed in 1394 by the Venetian Giovanni di Giacomo da Borgo San Sepolcro.
- Five Wells Square
- St Mary's Church, which retains a fine Romanesque campanile from 1105, belongs to a Benedictine Convent founded in 1066 by a noblewoman of Zadar by the name of Cika with the permanent Ecclesiastical art exhibition "The Gold and Silver of Zadar".
- Citadel. Built in 1409 southwest of the Land Gate, it has remained the same to this day.
- Land Gate – built to a design by the Venetian architect Michele Sanmicheli in 1543.
- Sea organ
- The Great Arsenal
- Among the other chief buildings are the Loggia del Comune, rebuilt in 1565, and containing a public library; the old palace of the priors, now the governor's residence; and the episcopal palaces.

=== Culture ===
The first university of Zadar was mentioned in writing as early as in 1396 and it was a part of a Dominican monastery. It closed in 1807.

Between the 15th and 17th centuries Zadar was an important Renaissance center, producing an array of Italian Dalmatia architects, sculptors, painters and scholars such as Giorgio da Sebenico, Laurana and Francesco Laurana, Giorgio Ventura, Andrea Meldolla and Giovanni Francesco Fortunio (who wrote the first Italian grammar book).

Zadar was, along with Split and Dubrovnik, also one of the centres of the development of Croatian literature. The 15th and 16th centuries were marked by important activities of Croatians writing in the national language: Jerolim Vidolić, Petar Zoranić (who wrote the first Croatian novel, Planine), Brne Karnarutić, Juraj Baraković, Šime Budinić.

Under French rule (1806–1810), the first Dalmatian newspaper Il Regio Dalmata – Kraglski Dalmatin was published in Zadar. It was printed in Italian and Croatian; the latter used for the first time in a newspaper.

In the second half of the 19th century, Zadar was a centre of the movement for the cultural and national revivals in Dalmatia (Italian and Croatian).

Today Zadar's cultural institutions include:

- The Croatian Theatre House
- The National Museum
- The Archaeological Museum (established in 1830)
- The Museum of Ancient Glass
- The University of Zadar (founded in 1396, active until 1807 and refounded in 2002)
- The Maritime Museum
- Permanent Exhibition of Sacral Art
- Croatian Singing Musical Society Zoranić (established in 1885)
- Musical Evenings in St. Donatus (established in 1961)
- International Choirs Competition (established in 1997)
- Arsenal Zadar

== City government ==
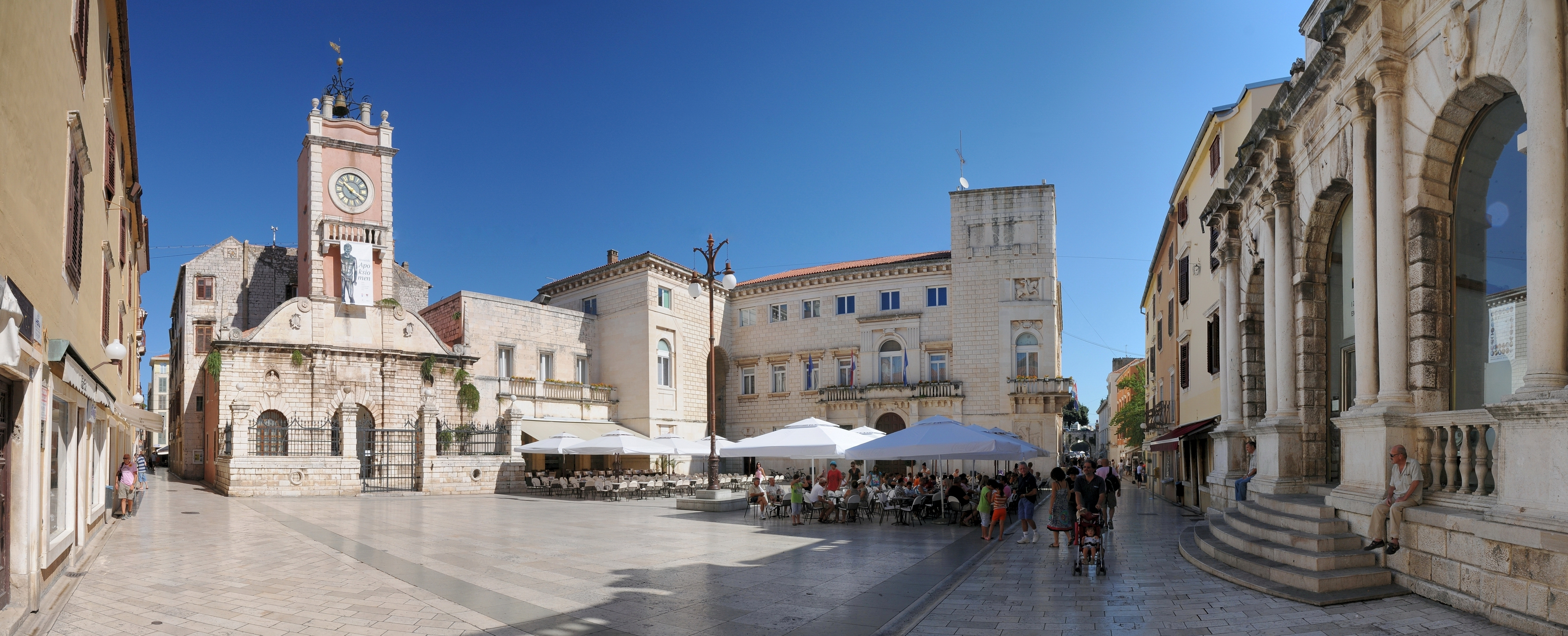
The town hall (centre) in Narodni trg (People's Square)

The administrative area of the City of Zadar includes the following settlements (population as of 2011):

- Babindub, population 31
- Brgulje, population 48
- Crno, population 537
- Ist, population 182
- Kožino, population 815
- Mali Iž, population 215
- Molat, population 107
- Olib, population 140
- Petrčane, population 601
- Premuda, population 64
- Rava, population 117
- Silba, population 292
- Veli Iž, population 400
- Zadar, population 71,471
- Zapuntel, population 42

c mainland (Babindub, Crno, Kožino and Petrčane), while some are on the islands of Ist, Iž, Molat, Olib, Premuda, Rava and Silba. The total city area, including the islands, covers 194 km^{2}.

Zadar is divided into 37 local districts, some of which correspond to settlements:

- Arbanasi
- Bili Brig
- Bokanjac
- Brgulje
- Brodarica
- Crno
- Crvene Kuće
- Diklo
- Dračevac
- Ist
- Jazine I
- Jazine II
- Kožino
- Mala Rava
- Mali Iž
- Mali Iž - Porovac
- Maslina
- Molat
- Novi Bokanjac
- Olib
- Petrčane
- Ploča
- Povljana
- Poluotok
- Premuda
- Puntamika
- Ričina
- Silba
- Sinjoretovo
- Smiljevac
- Stanovi
- Vela Rava
- Veli Iž
- Vidikovac
- Višnjik
- Voštarnica
- Zapuntel

The current mayor of Zadar is Šime Erlić (HDZ). He was elected in 2025

=== Minority councils and representatives ===
Directly elected minority councils and representatives are tasked with consulting tasks for the local or regional authorities in which they are advocating for minority rights and interests, integration into public life and participation in the management of local affairs. At the 2023 Croatian national minorities councils and representatives elections Albanians, Bosniaks and Serbs of Croatia fulfilled legal requirements to each elect their own 15 members minority councils of the City of Zadar while Slovenes of Croatia elected their individual representative.

== Demographics ==
Historical populations of Zadar (municipal)
Year	Pop.	±%
1880	19,778	—
1890	21,933	+10.9%
1900	24,778	+13.0%
1910	27,426	+10.7%
1921	26,241	−4.3%
1931	26,882	+2.4%
1948	23,610	−12.2%
1953	25,465	+7.9%
1961	33,464	+31.4%
1971	50,520	+51.0%
1981	67,154	+32.9%
1991	80,355	+19.7%
2001	72,718	−9.5%
2011	75,062	+3.2%
2021	70,779	−5.7%
Source: Naselja i stanovništvo Republike Hrvatske 1857–2001, DZS, Zagreb, 2005

Zadar is the fifth largest city in Croatia and the second largest in Dalmatia, with a population of 70,779 according to the 2021 census. The 2021 census shows Zadar with a population of 67,134 or 94.85% of its citizens being ethnic Croats. The second largest ethnic group according to the 2021 census are Serbs, with 1,371 or 1.94% of the population

Zadar was the capital of Venetian Dalmatia and had a significant Italian-speaking community. According to the Austrian censuses, there were 7,423 residents of the central settlement that used Italian as their habitual language (64.6% of the total population) in 1890, 9,318 (66.3%) in 1910. The commune as a whole had 7,672 (27.2%) Italian speakers in 1890, and 11,552 (31.6%) in 1910. Following political changes after the dissolution of Austro-Hungarian Empire, the Italian population in the urban core was 12,075 (70.8%) in 1921, and 12,283 (65.9%) in the comune. Their number dropped drastically during the Istrian-Dalmatian exodus, which took place from 1943 to 1960. In 2011, only 90 people declared themselves as Italians, corresponding to 0.12% of the total population.

City of Zadar: Population trends 1291–1598
v

population	8698	5740	13000	8051	7785	6300	7800	6536	6531	7000	8100	6917	5564	6917	5287	5579	7161	7600	5335	6163	6183	5814	6085	5614	5390	5200
	1291	1500	1525	1527	1528	1542	1550	1553	1554	1557	1559	1560	1561	1566	1572	1573	1575	1578	1581	1586	1588	1593	1594	1595	1596	1598

Sources: Graovac 2004
City of Zadar: Population trends 1608–1845
v

population	5784	2073	5285	2354	3700	3300	6000	3597	2804	3181	3719	4650	4936	5002	5098	5399	5154	5386	5509	5543	5694	6012	5798	6461	6479	6747
	1608	1619	1625	1629	1670	1671	1678	1682	1695	1714	1736	1771	1781	1795	1808	1809	1811	1818	1819	1821	1823	1825	1829	1833	1838	1845

Sources: Graovac 2004
City of Zadar: Population trends 1857–2021
v

population	8331	9898	11992	13726	15847	18077	15804	17358	13954	16146	25243	43087	60371	76343	69556	75062	70779
	1857	1869	1880	1890	1900	1910	1921	1931	1948	1953	1961	1971	1981	1991	2001	2011	2021

Sources: Graovac 2004; DZS 2011, 2021

== Economy ==
Major industries include tourism, traffic, seaborne trade, agriculture, fishing and fish farming activities; metal manufacturing and mechanical engineering industries; chemicals and non-metal industry; and banking. Some of the largest companies with headquarters in Zadar are:

- Tankerska plovidba (maritime transport)
- Cromaris (food industry)
- Bakmaz (retail)
- Sonik (retail)
- Turisthotel (tourism)
- Maraska (food industry)
- Punta Sakla (tourism)
- Intermod (furniture retail and tourism)
- Adria, Mardešić (fish production)
- Vodovod (water supply)
- OTP Bank Hrvatska (finance industry)
- SAS (machine tools)
- Aluflexpack (production of flexible packaging)
- Arsenal Holdings (tourism)
- Liburnija (transportation)

The farmland just northeast of Zadar, Ravni Kotari, is a well known source of marasca cherries. Distilleries in Zadar have produced Maraschino since the 16th century.

== Education ==
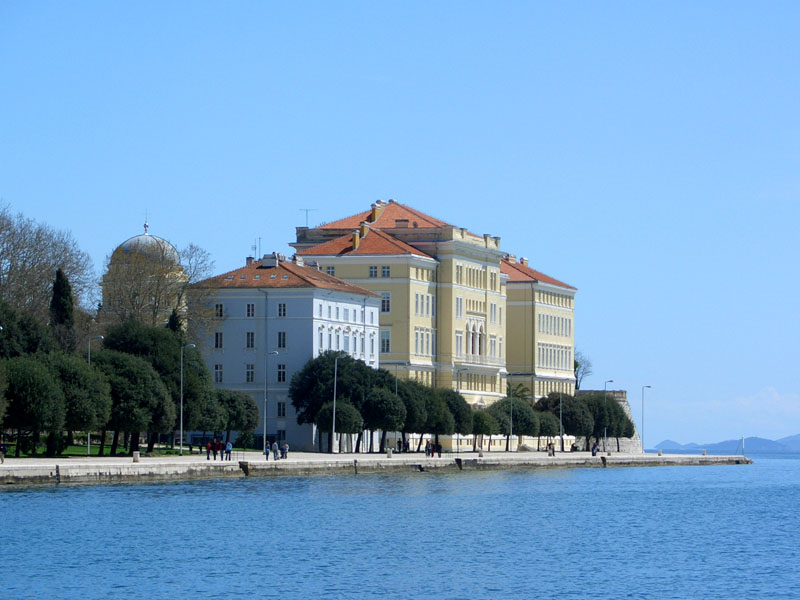
University of Zadar

There are nine primary schools and 16 secondary schools, including six gymnasiums, in Zadar.

=== University ===
The University of Zadar was founded by the Dominicans in 1396 as Universitas Iadertina, a theological seminary. It was the first institute of higher learning in the country. In 1807 it ceased to become an independent institution and its functions were taken over by other local universities. In 1956 the University of Zagreb, the country's second oldest university, re-established it as its satellite Faculty of Arts campus. The Faculty later became a part of the University of Split, and in 2003, a full-fledged independent university. The university comprises 25 departments with more than 6.000 students.

== Science ==
In 1998, Zadar hosted the Central European Olympiad in Informatics (CEOI).

== Transportation ==
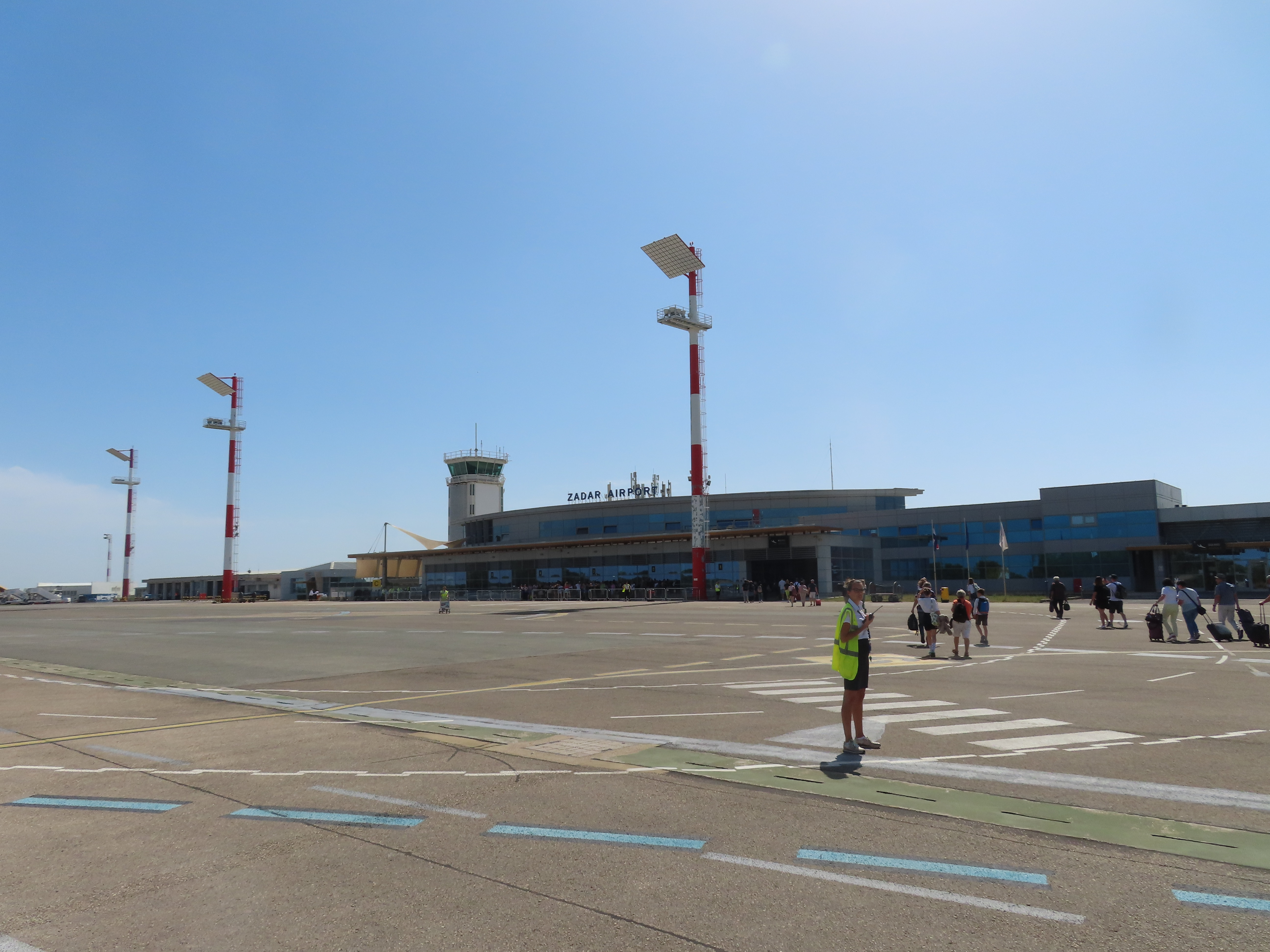
Zadar Airport

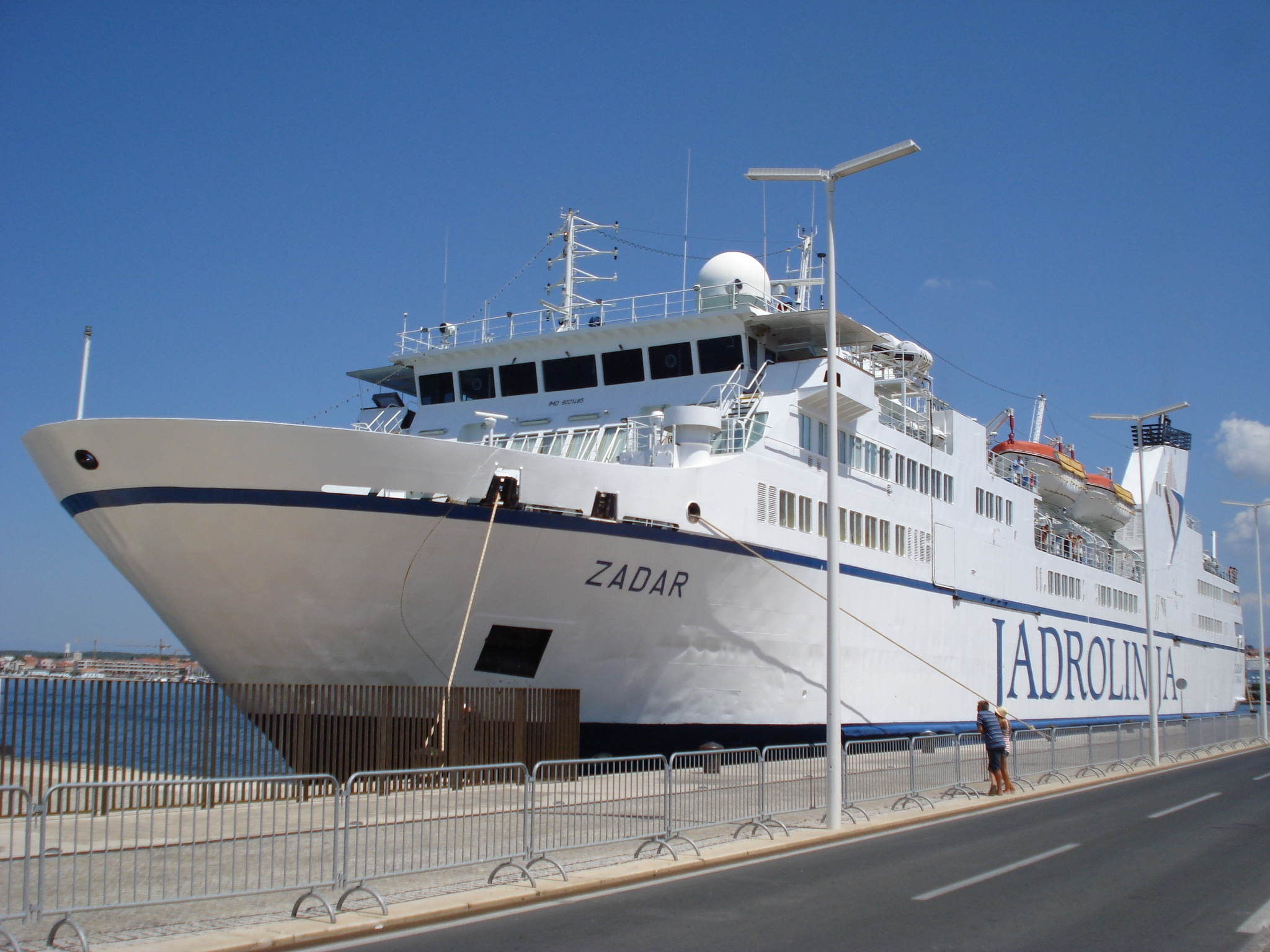
Zadar Port

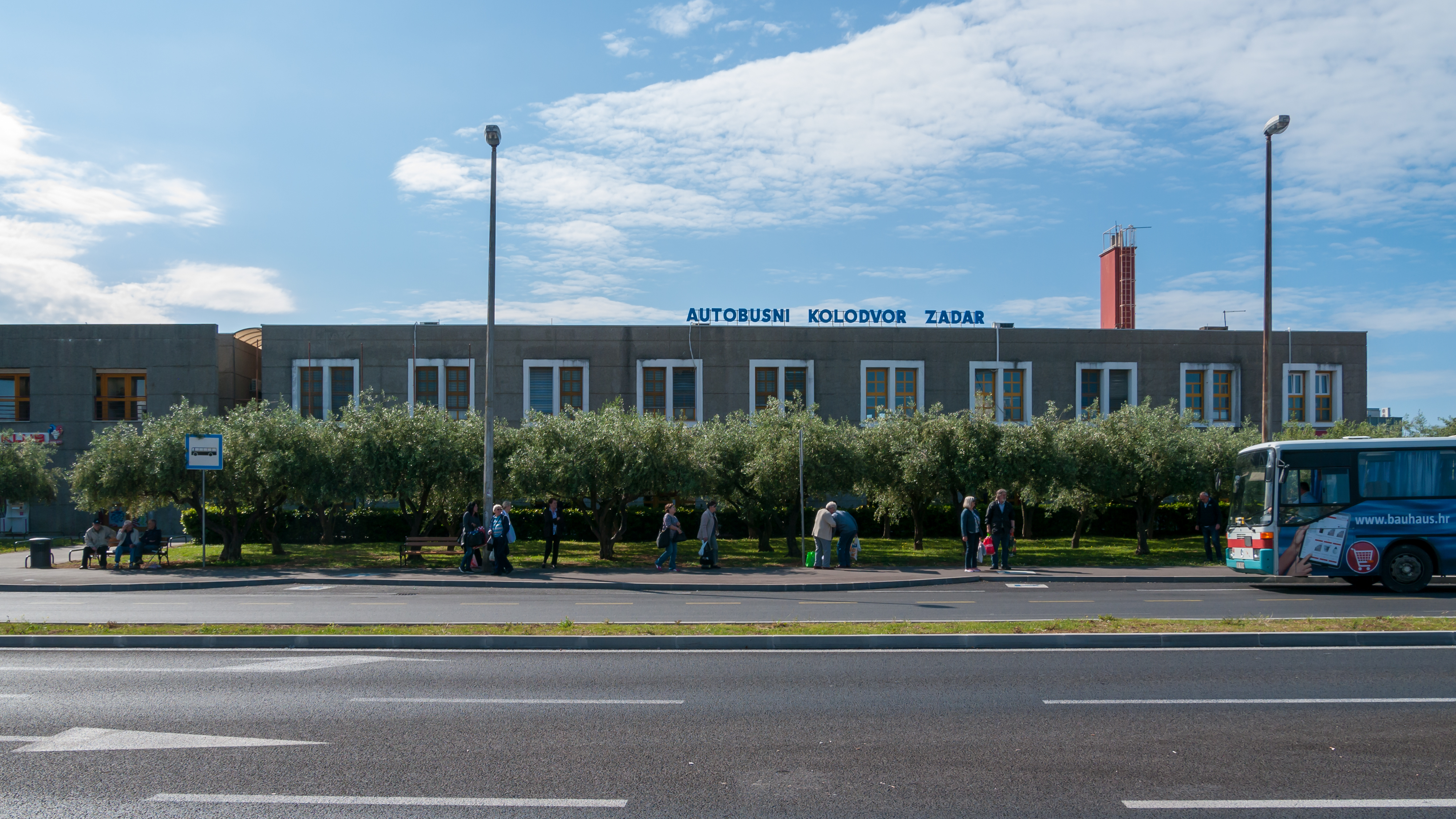
Zadar Bus Station

In the 20th century, roads became more important than sea routes, but Zadar remained an important traffic point. The main road along the Adriatic passes through the city. In the immediate vicinity is the Zagreb–Dubrovnik highway which connects to Split and it was completed in 2005. Zadrans can access to the highway by two interchanges: Zadar 1 exit in the north and Zadar 2 highway hub near Zemunik in the south. The southern interchange is connected to Zadar port of Gaženica by the D424 expressway.

Today, buses are the only kind of ground public transportation with which one can reach Zadar. Zadar's bus station is used by both inter-city buses (which provide Zadar's connection with the rest of the country) and buses operated by the company "Liburnija" which provide public transit to the city of Zadar and its suburbs.

Since 1966, during the time of Yugoslavia, railway has linked Zadar with Knin, where it joins the mainline from Zagreb to Split. However, all passenger trains between Knin and Zadar were since 2013 replaced with the buses that ran in organisation of the national railway company Croatian Railways. As the company discounted bus-replacement service in 2020, Zadar has officially become the city without passenger railway connections.

Zadar also has an international ferry line to Ancona in Italy. Ships also connect Zadar with islands of its archipelago from two ferry ports: one located in the town center serving catamaran services and the other one located in the south suburb of Gaženica serving ferry and distant services.

Zadar International Airport is located in Zemunik, around 14 kilometres (9 miles) to the east of Zadar and accessible via the expressway. The airport is experiencing year on year an average of 30% increase in passenger traffic mainly due to arrivals of lowcost carriers (Ryanair, InterSky, JobAir, etc.) connecting Zadar from the end of March through October with over 20 cities throughout Europe.

== Sports ==
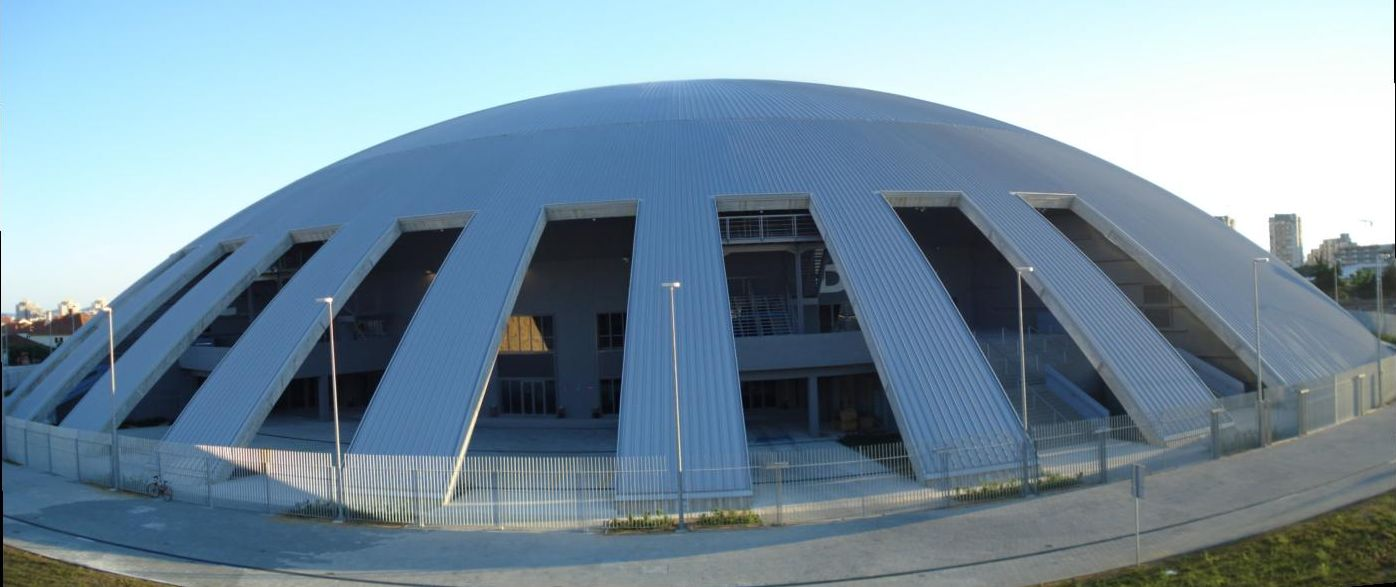
Krešimir Ćosić Hall

The basketball club is KK Zadar, the football club HNK Zadar, and the local handball club RK Zadar. The bowling club Kuglački klub Zadar is also very successful. Zadar is also the hometown of Croatian handball player Ivan Ninčević and football players Luka Modrić, Dado Pršo, Šime Vrsaljko and Danijel Subašić.

Zadar also has a badminton club.

The city hosts an annual night half marathon with a capacity of 2000. Around 1400 runners attended in 2024.

== International relations ==
Zadar is twinned, or maintains cultural, economic and educational ties with:

- Dundee, Scotland, United Kingdom
- Reggio Emilia, Italy
- Romans-sur-Isère, France
- Fürstenfeldbruck, Germany
- Székesfehérvár, Hungary
- Padua, Italy
- Iquique, Chile
- Banská Bystrica, Slovakia
- Milwaukee, United States

== Acknowledgements ==
=== Honorary citizens ===
Croatian: Počasni građanin Grada Zadra

- 2019: Luka Modrić
- 2021: Tomislav Ivčić

=== City of Zadar Lifetime achievement Award ===
Croatian: Nagrada Grada Zadra za životno djelo
(selected recipients)

- 1999: Ivo Petricioli
- 2002: Šime Batović
- 2003: Šime Peričić
- 2006: Pavle Dešpalj
- 2007: Joja Ricov
- 2010: Ante Stamać
- 2019: Damir Magaš
- 2020: Janko Bobetko
- 2021: Ivica Matešić "Jeremija"

=== City of Zadar Award ===
Croatian: Nagrada Grada Zadra
(selected recipients)

- 1996: Igor Kuljerić
- 2000: Bowling club Zadar
- 2004: Institute for Historical Sciences (HAZU), Jadrolinija
- 2005: Šime Fantela, Igor Marenić
- 2007: Ivan Repušić
- 2009: Šime Fantela, Igor Marenić
- 2010: Klapa Intrade
- 2011: Ante Gotovina
- 2012: University of Zadar
- 2013: People's Museum Zadar, Wings of Storm
- 2016: Šime Fantela, Igor Marenić
- 2017: Stipe Žunić
- 2018: Mihovil Fantela, Šime Fantela, Dominik Livaković, Luka Modrić, Danijel Subašić, Šime Vrsaljko
- 2022: Zadar Puppet Theatre

== Notable people ==
- Tullio Carminati (1894–1971), actor
- Arturo Colautti (1851–1914), journalist
- Gianni Garko (born 1935), actor
- Pope John IV (died 642), pope
- Tomislav Karamarko (born 1959), politician
- Brne Karnarutić (1515–1573), poet
- Francesco Laurana (c. 1430–1502), sculptor
- Dominik Livaković (born 1995), footballer
- Luka Modrić (born 1985), footballer
- Dado Pršo (born 1974), footballer
- Giorgio da Sebenico (c. 1410–1473), sculptor
- Savo Štrbac (born 1949), lawyer and author
- Danijel Subašić (born 1984), footballer
- Enrico Tivaroni (1841–1925), magistrate
- Giorgio Ventura (16th-17th centuries), painter
- Georg von Trapp (1880-1947), K.u.K. submarine commander and father of the von Trapp Family singers

== See also ==
- History of Croatia
- History of Dalmatia
- Krešimir Ćosić Hall
- List of people from Zadar County
- Ottavio Missoni
- St. Michael's Church (Zadar)
- Stato da Màr
