= List of Glagolitic manuscripts (1600–1699) =

This is a list of manuscripts written in the Glagolitic script in the 17th century.

== List ==
Light red represents manuscripts with Glagolitic only in inclusions or paratext.
Pale red represents mixed manuscripts with Glagolitic as a main script.

Type	Abbreviation	Date	Designation	Library	Place of origin	Folia	Dimensions	Columns and rows	Notes	Scans
miscellany	CVra	1600 (May 13)	III a 33 (Kuk. 4)	Arhiv HAZU		216	19.5 x 14.5 cm		Vranićev zbornik. Written by a single hand with some variation. Finished 13 May 1600, written mostly or entirely that year or immediately before. Includes note by a different hand in 1632: that of Ivan Vranić of Bakar. Acquired by Kukuljević. One photograph in Štefanić 1970. Bibliography:	
homiliary		1600	III b 13 (Kuk. 5)	Arhiv HAZU		233	28 x 19.8 cm		Knjiga "Disipula". Scribe: priest Ivan Brozović of Selci in either Selci or Bribir, for lord Anton Županić. Owned by priest Ivan Kršulja of Bribir in 1682. Acquired by Kukuljević, probably in Bribir. One photograph in Štefanić 1970. Bibliography:	IzSt (2008)
legal		1600 (about)	Glagolitica II-24	HDA	Grižane				Neka žena tuži se na svoga sestrića Mikulu Kulentića da je pogazio svoje obećanje u vezi sa zemljom koju mu je dala na obradu.	IzSt (2008)
christenings		1601–1613	br. 1372	DaZd	Ugljan (town)	52 p	30.8 x 10.2 cm		Glagolitic with Cyrillic note on page 44.	DaZd, FS
christenings, marriages		1601–1613	IV a 80/15	Arhiv HAZU	Brbinj	29	19.5 x 15 cm		The oldest parish register from Brbinj. One photograph in Štefanić 1970.	
protocol		1601–1636			Veli Lošinj	192	30.5 x 20.7 cm	1 co	Božićević Protocol (Božićevićev protokol). Scribes: Ivan Božićević, his nephew Matij Božićević, Žuvan Krstinić. The earliest date to 1593 but they are transcriptions. Acquired 1746 by notary Vintura Botterini. First noted 1791 in the chronicle of Lošinj notary Martin (Bonaventura) Botterini. At the time it was in the archive of the Botterini family. Botterini's note was relayed by Lošinj historians Bonicelli and Nicolich. In 1900 it was still in Veli Lošinj (in the župni ured). Milčetić was prevented from seeing it by the war. Found on Lošinj by Leo Košuta 1951, and a microfilm was made for Arhiv JAZU with sign. I/33. First microfilm in Zagreb made some time after 1951. Photographs of pages published in Košuta 1988. Used by Josip Hamm in his studies of the Susak dialect conducted from 1953 on. And in the dialectal studies of Eduard Hercigonja. It has also been used in scholarly works on the geography and history of Lošinj. Bibliography:	IzSt (2008)
annerversaries		1601–1845			Silba	14 p	30.6 x 22 cm		Glagolitic to 1809 then Latinic. Lost as of 2015.	
		1601–1722	HR–DAZD–359 (Obitelj Lantana collection) kut. 67 sign. 1083	DaZd		49			Nagodba između braće Zloić iz Ždrelca i braće Bonicelli s nacrtom terena Bonicellijevih. Latinic with some Glagolitic folia (ff. 12, 15, 18, 21, 32, 38). Part of Lantana family archive. Acquired by Državni arhiv u Zadru 1945.	
dialogue	DiFl	1602	R 4902	NSK	Croatia	96			Dijalog Grgura pape (Dialogues of Gregory). Bought by NSK on 28-29 June 1976 from the Thomas Phillipps collection in London, at lot 1240 of Sotheby's.	NSK
will		1603 (June 1)	II br. 237	Šibenik (Gradski muzej)	Tisno				Will of Jelina daughter of Mihovil. Scribe: unknown. Photograph in Šupuk 1957.	
legal		1603 (June 2)	Glagolitica II-25	HDA	?				List of serfs with their monetary duties (Popis kmetova s naznakom njihova podavanja u novcu).	IzSt (2008)
will		1603			Bijar (Samostan Sv. Marije)				Oporuka Ivana Krbića.	
		1603–1688	VII 35	Arhiv HAZU	Boljunec	190	20.5 x 15 cm		Knjiga bratovštine (crkve) sv. Roka u Boljuncu blizu Trsta. Glagolitic to 1608 then Italian and Latin. Acquired by JAZU in 1930.	
		1603–1641	III a 36 (Kuk. 291)	Arhiv HAZU		29	21 x 16 cm		Kopijalna knjiga obitelji Tanić. Begins 10 May 1603. Acquired by Štefan Kociančić.	
confirmations		1603 (about), 1607		?	Petrčane	16 p	21.5 x 16 cm		6 pages cursive Glagolitic, 10 empty. Scribe: parish priest of Petrčane. Lost as of 2015.	
christenings, marriages, deaths		1604–1668, 1675, 1676	I c 54 (Kuk. 9)	Arhiv HAZU	Bribir	123	29.8 x 20.7 cm		Christenings (1603–1668, 1676), marriages (1603–1660) and deaths (1650–1667, 1675). Glagolitic to 1649 then Latinic with reversion to Glagolitic in 1658, 1665–1668. One photograph in Štefanić 1970.	
christenings		1605–1617	VII 88	Arhiv HAZU	Dolina	102	21 x 14.5 cm		Glagolitic to 1607 then mixed until the final Glagolitic entry 12 May 1610. One photograph in Štefanić 1970.	
confirmations		1605–1612			Olib	4 p	20 x 11 cm	1 co		
annerversaries		1605	sign. Atti e conti 1605.	Riječka nadbiskupija (povijesna pismohrana)					Nedovršeni godar riječke zborne crkve. Spinčić, Štefanić and Deković each wrote about it before the original was found in July 2006. Most is Latinic, with some Glagolitic.	
christenings		1606–1738	br. 40	Vrbnik (župni ured)	Vrbnik	251	30 x 21.5 cm			
deaths		1606–1679	br. 2286	DaZd	Pašman	90 p	29 x 10 cm			DaZd
ledger		1606–1607, 1692	Glagolitica, Mapa 1, S.f.49 / c.4	NUK	Dobrinj	3	29 x 21 cm		Fragmenti iz Knjige blagajnika kapitula na Dobrinju.	IzSt (2017 from NUK)
legal		1606 (May 1)	Glagolitica II-26	HDA	Grižane				Spor između Grižanaca i Drivničana u vezi s istjeravanjem stoke.	IzSt (2008)
christenings		1607–1613		Arhiv Zadarske nadbiskupije	Žman	56 p	20.1 x 14.7 cm	1 co	The original.	GUZ, PB, FS
christenings		1607–1610		Arhiv Zadarske nadbiskupije	Žman	20 p	21.3 x 14.9 cm	1 co	A corrected copy of the 1607–1613 christenings register by the hand of the same parish priest that wrote the latter.	GUZ, PB, FS
confirmations		1607–1679	br. 2289	DaZd	Pašman	88 p	29 x 10 cm		Part of br. 600.	DaZd
confirmations		1607–1612	Glagolitica, br. 2	Split (Arhov Arheološkog muzeja)	Banj	55 p	21.5 x 15 cm		Glagolitic to p 86 then Latinic. Begins 4 October 1607 to 10 June 1612. Only 7 pages Glagolitic. Thought lost until rediscovered by Arsen Duplančić in April 2015. Bibliography:	IzSt (2008)
confirmations		1607		Arhiv Zadarske nadbiskupije	Žman	8 p	20.1 x 14.7 cm	1 co		GUZ, PB
marriages		1607–1613		Arhiv Zadarske nadbiskupije	Žman	21 p	21.4 x 15.6 cm	1 co	The original.	GUZ, PB, FS
marriages		1607–1610		Arhiv Zadarske nadbiskupije	Žman	12 p	21.1 x 15.5 cm	1 co	A corrected copy of the 1607–1613 christenings register by the hand of the same scribe that wrote the latter.	GUZ, PB, FS
deaths		1607–1612		Arhiv Zadarske nadbiskupije	Žman	16 p	20 x 14.6 cm	1 co	Together with other Žman registers in a single binding.	GUZ, PB, FS
deaths		1607–1613	Garanjin-Fanfonja collection (156), Glagolitika	Državni arhiv u Splitu	Lukoran	2	21 x 16 cm		Acquired by Fanfogna family library in Split.	FS
deaths		1607–1612	br. 797	DaZd	Pašman	8 p (new pagination)	29 x 10 cm		Pages 5-8 empty. Part of br. 600.	DaZd
deaths		1607–1612		DaZd	Pašman	4 p (new pagination)	38 x 15 cm		Page 3 empty. Not to be confused with the other 1607–1612 deaths register of Pašman.	
receipts and expenditures		1607–1648		Monastery of Saint Mary Magdalene in Porat, Krk	Dubašnica, Krk	172 +	35.2 x 25 cm		Knjiga primitaka i izdataka.	
		1608–1685 (or 1608–1639)	Obiteljski fond De Franceschi iz Gologorice, inv. br. 46	Državni arhiv u Rijeci	Hum	26	30 x 10 cm		Knjiga prihoda župne crkve u Humu (1609–1639/1685). Glagolitic to 1639.	
christenings		1608–1613, 1623–1658	Arhiv obitelji Garanjin-Fanfonja, Glagolitika	Državni arhiv u Splitu	Sukošan	56 p				FS
marriages		1608–1658	Arhiv obitelji Fanfonja, Glagolitika sv. br. 12	Državni arhiv u Splitu	Sukošan	36 p			Once belonged to Fanfogna library.	FS
deaths		1608–1658	Arhiv obitelji Garanjin-Fanfogna, Glagolitika	Državni arhiv u Splitu	Sukošan	24 p				FS
register		1609–1727	Glagolitica I-6	Croatian State Archives	Vranja	95	32.5 x 11 cm		Zapisnik primitaka i izdataka računa bratovštine oltara sv. Fabijana i Sebastijana i bratovštine sv. Fabijana i Sebastijana te sv. Duha i sv. Monike u Vranji. Matica krštenih, umrlih i vjenčanih župe Vranja u Istri. Glagolitic then Latinic and Italian. Acquired by HDA with the ostavština of Ivan Kukuljević.	IzSt (2008)
		1609–1712	R 6528	NSK	Vinodol				Različite glagoljske isprave iz Vinodola. Includes multiple 13 manuscripts.	
		1609–1698	VIII 205	Arhiv HAZU	Bribir	72	29.5 x 10.2 cm		Knjiga bratovštine sv. Križa u Bribiru. Glagolitic to 1635, Latinic from 1633. Same manuscript history as VIII 204. One photograph in Štefanić 1970.	
judgement		1609 (August 3)	Glagolitica II-27	HDA	Kastav				Presuda u svezi s jednom mirinom u sporu među braćom Varlini.	IzSt (2008)
deed		1609 (September 15)	R 6258	NSK	Bribir				Listina bilježnika Ivana Botrića.	NSK
legal		1610 (December 13)	Glagolitica II-28	HDA	Bakar				Julije Čikulin piše knezu Martinu Juretiću u Bribir da popu Andriji Anželiću iz Grižana dade lanjsku pšenicu po mjeri.	IzSt (2008)
law		1610 (about)	Mažuranićeva zbirka	Arhiv HAZU	Grižane	1	19.5 x 28 cm	1 co	Sopaljska općina (Drivenčani, Grižanci, Belgraci i Kotorani) potvrđuje stare općinske odredbe i kazne. Original dated 8 September 1395 in Grižane. Survives in copy around 1610 by the hand of Ivan Mužinić. First published in Šurmin 1898 in transcription by Radoslav Lopašić, with location incorrectly stated to be Novi.	
christenings, confirmations, marriages, deaths		1612–1650	br. 1338	DaZd	Tkon	188 p	30 x 10 cm		4 bindings. 1st binding contains christenings from 3 May 1613 to 15 May 1650; 2nd binding confirmations 1618–1645; 3rd binding marriages 16 January 1612 to 20 June 1649; 4th binding deaths 13 January 1612 to 15 March 1650. Bibliography:	FS
christenings, marriages		1612–1614, 1630–1693	IX 40	Arhiv HAZU	Labinci (sv. Nedilja, s. Domenica)	125	29.5 x 10 cm		Christenings (1612–1614, 1630–1693) and marriages (1681–1692). Italian with only 2 Glaglitic entries: 20 March 1651 from one hand and on f. 55 from a hand that wrote mainly Latinic, Antonio Rossich. On textual evidence, Glagolitic was used for parish registers in Labinci until 1613, and then in 1614 the book was flipped upside down and Italian was used.	FS
deaths		1612–1650		Arhiv Zadarske nadbiskupije	Žman	47 p	29.6 x 9.9 cm	1 co		GUZ, PB, FS
deaths		1612–1649	inv. br. 30	DaZd	Banj	26 p	29.7 x 10 cm	1 co		DaZd, FS
		1612–1699	VIII 204	Arhiv HAZU	Bribir	85	29.5 x 9.8 cm		Knjiga bratovštine sv. Stjepana u Bribiru. Includes transcriptions from 1487–1602. Glagolitic to 3 January 1639, Latinic from 1634.	
deaths		1612, 1675–1728	IV. 5. 12. (old Inv. br. 551)		Sveti Ivan od Šterne				Italian with Glagolitic on one reused old page dating to 1612.	FS
		1612–1658	II c 77/a	Arhiv HAZU	Boljun	26	30 x 21 cm		Komad knjige bratovštine sv. Tijela (1612–1658). Glagolitic with some Italian.	
christenings, marriages, deaths		1613–1678	br. 1385	DaZd	Ugljan (town)	296 p	30 x 10.1 cm		Christenings 1613–1659 (pp. 57–192), 1650–1673 (pp. 1–56), marriages 1613–1650 (pp. 193–264), deaths 1651–1678 (pp. 265–296).	DaZd, FS
christenings, marriages, deaths, confirmations		1613–1648		Arhiv Zadarske nadbiskupije	Rava	174 p	29.4 x 10 cm		Christenings 1613–1642, marriages 1613–1635, deaths 1613–1648, confirmations 1618–1635.	
christenings		1613–1699	inv. br. 25	DaZd	Banj	214 p	29.6 x 10 cm	1 co		DaZd, FS
marriages		1613–1630		Arhiv Zadarske nadbiskupije	Grusi (Briševo)		30 x 10.8 cm			
christenings		1613–1650	br. 1031	DaZd	Sali	150 p	29.5 x 9.5 cm		Glagolitic with one Italian entry 28 December 1648. Two entries from 1643 are from the parish of Sv. Fume in Sutomišćica on Ugljan, likely a sign that the parish priest of Olib don P. Sikirić brought it with him during a visit. Facsimile published 2011.	FS
christenings		1613–1649		Arhiv Zadarske nadbiskupije	Žman	72 p	30.2 x 10.2 cm	1 co	From 1640–1645, the župnik Hrvatinić uses sat "hundred" for the year.	GUZ, PB, FS
marriages		1613–1650	br. 705	DaZd	Olib	62 p	29.2 x 11.4 cm	1 co	On pages 563-566 there are 2 entries in 1643 from the parish "Sv. Fume" (Sutomišćica) on Ugljan, likely brought by parish priest Pavle Sikirić when he arrived in Olib as a paroch. Facsimile published 2011. Begins 16 February 1613.	DaZd, FS
marriages		1613–1680	br. 2288	DaZd	Pašman	105 p			Part of br. 600.	DaZd
marriages		1613–1650	br. 1031	DaZd	Sali	93 p	29.5 x 9.5 cm			FS
deaths		1613–1650	br. 705	Državni arhiv Zadar	Olib	54 p	30.2 x 10 cm	1 co	Bound with christenings 1618–1663, marriages 1566–1613, christenings 1605–1612, eucharist of 1595, miscellaneous notes 1575–1605, marriages 1671–1681, 1613–1650. Facsimile published 2011.Behins 15 March 1613. Bibliography:	DaZd FS
deaths		1613–1649	br. 1031	DaZd	Sali	57 p	29.4 x 9.5 cm			FS
deaths		1613–1623	br. 1058	Državni arhiv Zadar	Silba	10 p	29.6 x 10 cm	1 co	None of the scribes signed their name.	DaZd, FS
miscellany		1614	IV a 77 (IV a 87)	Arhiv HAZU		26	20 x 14.5 cm		Molitveni zbornik. Written by a single hand. Acquired by Ivan Berčić on 3 December 1866 from a certain Petešić. One photograph in Štefanić 1970. Bibliography:	
"Dialogues of Gregory", Legend of Saint Alexius, Testament of Abraham	CHod (DiHod +)	2.III.1614-20.VI.1617	F.V.6 (F V 6)	Biblioteca Comunale degli Intronati	Vrbnik	160	23 x 17 cm		Hodanić Miscellany (Hodanićev zbornik). Scribe Mikula Hodanić of Vrbnik began writing on 2 March 1614 and finished on 20 June 1617. Donated to the Biblioteca Comunale of Siena by Adalbert Fortis around 1771. Leo Košuta made a microfilm in 1975, housed in the Staroslavenski institut "Svetozar Ritig" in Zagreb. Microfilm made by 1978 (Star. inst. M 128) and photocopy in same institute in 1979 (F 143).	
christenings, marriages, deaths, souls		1614–1794	br. 807, 808	DaZd	Petrčane	539 p	29 x 10 cm		Contains christenings 1614–1685 (pp. 1–111), 1736–1769 (pp. 184–259) marriages 1656–1686 (pp. 112–143), deaths 1652–1686 (pp. 160–183), 1691–1794 (pp. 422–539), souls 1656–1686 (pp. 260–331), 1689–1709 (pp. 332–411), 1715–1719 (pp. 412–422). 8 bindings with common pagination. Glagolitic with 1 Latinic entry and 1 Italian entry, and 1 Cyrillic note on page 63. Majuscule notes on cover.	1: DaZd, FS; 2: DaZd, FS
will		1615 (October 28)	Glagolitica II-29	HDA	Novi Vinodolski				Will of Mikula Kargačin (Oporuka Mikule Kargačina.	IzSt (2008)
		1616–1632	Osor collection VIII	Krk	Osor	1164			Acta varia. Latinic with some Glagolitic testimonies in the Ordinationes section (f. 1148–1164).	
christenings, marriages, confirmations		1616–1653	IX 19	Arhiv HAZU	Baška	116	22.9 x 20.5 cm		Christenings (1616–1653), marriages (1616–1652), confirmations (1622–1635).	FS
will		1616 (September 4)	Glagolitica II-30	HDA	Grižane				Will of Marica Frujinić (Oporuka Marice Frujinić).	IzSt (2008)
miscellany	CFat	1617	IV a 124 (old IV a 141)	Arhiv HAZU		80	20.7 x 15.4 cm		Fatevićev zbornik duhovnoga štiva (Fatević spiritual miscellany). Written mostly by a single hand: Mikula Fatević chaplain on Rava for the main text, with later notes by Tome Bungurov chaplain on Rava (in Cyrillic) and Mikula Pilicarić or Juričić (Glagolitic and Cyrillic); the Glagolitic pagination was by the same hand but in different time periods. He left a date 15 February 1617 on f. 44 and a date 1617 at the end of the book. Probably begun 1616 or early 1617. Fatević also wrote register entries 1613–1628 in Rava and Luka. Later notes in the book were written in Cyrillic by Tome Bungurov and in Glagolitic and Cyrillic by Mikula Pilicarić/Juričić of Pakoštane in 1636. Microfilm at HDA by 1952. Bibliography:	IzSt (2008)
		1617–1810	inv. br. 22	Poljica (župni ured)	Poljica	69	30 x 10 cm		Knjiga bratovštine presvetoga ruzarija. Last entry 21 July 1810.	
christenings, marriages, deaths		1618–1672		Poreč (Biskupijski arhiv)	Hum	81	33 x 11 cm		A facsimile of the Glagolitic pages was published in Vlahov 2003.	
confirmations		1618–1663		Arhiv Zadarske nadbiskupije	Žman	43 p	30 x 10.2 cm	1 co		GUZ, PB, FS
confirmations		1618–1655, 1663–1675	Arhiv obitelji Garanjin-Fanfonja, Sv. 11	Državni arhiv u Splitu	Sukošan	29 p			Once belonged to Fanfogna Garagnin family library.	FS
		1618	IV c 40	Arhiv HAZU					Veprinački zapisi 1618. Last seen by Milčetić or Strohal.	
		1618	II d 121	Arhiv HAZU					Veprinački zapisi 1618–1619. Last seen by Milčetić or Strohal.	
confirmations		1618–1663	br. 705	Državni arhiv Zadar	Olib	83 p	30 x 10 cm	1 co	Begins 15 May 1618.	DaZd, FS
confirmations		1618–1643, 1660–1722	br. 1386	DaZd	Ugljan (town)	16 p	29.5 x 10 cm		Scribes: don Matij Fatović as chaplain (1601–1631) then parish priest (1631–1650). Found in Split seminary library in 1948 and returned to Ugljan along with 4 other codices. Lost as of 2015.	DaZd, FS
confirmations		1618–1638		Arhiv HAZU	Sali	62 p				
matricula		1619–1733		Arhiv Zadarske nadbiskupije	Kali	272 p	22.8 x 19.2 cm	1 co	Madrikula Gospe od Luzarija u Kalima. In 1619 the scribe was Bere Stoišić the parish priest of Kukljica because Kali remained under Kukljica until 1620.	GUZ, PB
		1619–1650	Osor collection X	Krk	Osor	~600			Acta varia. Latinic with ~10 Glagolitic supplements in Patrimonia of 1619–1642.	
demarcation		1620 (January 25)	Glagolitica II-31	HDA	Bakar				Kopija parnice između sela Grižane i Driveničana u svezi s granicama između ta dva mjesta.	IzSt (2008)
grant		1620 (September 21), 1773 (March 31)	Glagolitica II-32	HDA	Grižane				Matij Marušić daruje komad zemljišta Antonu Folkoviću, a ovaj mu daje jalovicu i dvije koze. Includes 2 notes.	IzSt (2008)
		1621	II c 77/d	Arhiv HAZU	Mošćenice	8	30.3 x 21.2 cm		Notarske isprave Petra Lazarića u Mošćenicama.	
		1622–1672	VII 156 (or VII 256)	Arhiv HAZU		26	20.6 x 14.3 cm		Kopijalna knjiga popa Petra Bolonića. Acquired by Štefanić 1931 together with several other manuscripts from Mate Oršić parish priest in Vrh. Given to JAZU by Štefanić 1958.	
marriages		1622–1664			Mali Lošinj				Glagolitic to 1742 then Latinic, but everything after 1664 has been lost.	
marriages		1623–1711	br. 379	DaZd	Kali	92 p	30.3 x 9.8 cm			DaZd, FS
marriages		1623–1650		Arhiv Zadarske nadbiskupije	Silba	47 p	30 x 10 cm	1 co		GUZ, PB, FS
deaths		1623–1650	br. 1059	Državni arhiv Zadar	Silba	80 p	29.5 x 10.3 cm	1 co	Libar od martvih.	DaZd, FS
miscellany		1623	VII 116	Arhiv HAZU	Draga Bašćanska	5	15 x 10 cm		Odlomak zbornika Jurja Čeperića. Likely written in Draga Bašćanska where Vjekoslav Štefanić discovered it in the house of Jure Derenčinović. It includes an Italian note dated 16 November 1624.	
		1623, 1664–1771	18	Dobrinj (župni ured)	Dobrinj	64	27.2 x 20 cm		Knjiga svećeničke bratovštine sv. Ane.	
dialogue	DiMar	1623	I b 139	Arhiv HAZU		98	25 x 18 cm		Dijalog Grgura pape (Martešićev or Gržetićev). Scribe: Martin Martešić in Grižane, in script similar to the script of the 1588 Disipula (sign. VIII 126) but with differences in a, v, t, i. Once part of library of doctor Nikola Gržetić of Dobrinj at least on 13 June 1901 (in Zagreb). Purchased from Gržetić by JAZU in 1905. Two photographs in Štefanić 1970. Microfilm made by 1952 at HAZU. Bibliography:	
confirmations		1624–1669	br. 43	Vrbnik (župni ured)	Vrbnik	8	30.2 x 21 cm			
		1660–1670?	VII 42	Arhiv HAZU	Žman?	371	20.8 x 15 cm		Biblijska povijest. One hand for entire codex despite variations. Contains a translation from Italian of the New and Old Testaments in retold form with excerpts from Flavius Josephus. Italian original titled Compendio della vita di Gesù Christo. Purchased by JAZU with Petar Karlić collection in 1950. Likely written on a Dalmatian island. Two unrelated folia found inside codex point to Žman. One has a note in Italian "Io Zuane Guerini / Adi Primo 8bre 1679 in Salle li eredi de q.m Zuane Bruncico da Zman ano sotisfato". One is undated but written in Glagolitic of the 17th-18th centuries in addition to "Alle mani di sinor Remundo Ve mando poccho bouili agnette don Bozicho Didou da Azmano Vi saluto da tuti dal uostro parlaço". Handwriting of codex matches that of don Stipan Fatović of Žman who wrote himself in two registers 13/19 September 1668 to 1679, then mostly others wrote in his name to 19 March 1684. One photograph in Štefanić 1970. Bibliography:	
miscellany		1625–1630	I a 45 (Kuk. 330)	Arhiv HAZU		183	14.7 x 10 cm		Fra Antona Depope prijepisi iz Divkovićeva Nauka krstjanskog. Main scribe Franciscan friar Anton Depope born in Brzac (Dubašnica). He wrote the first half in the Porozina monastery on Cres, dated 1625, and the second half in the Glavotok monastery on Krk, dated 1630. Somewhat later hand B f. 170-177v and hand C f. 178-182v continued. Owned 1677 by fra Marko Kremenić (of Krk, priest in the Porat monastery 1683). Acquired by Kukuljević from Josip Benedikt Turčić of Dubašnica. One photograph in Štefanić 1970. Bibliography:	
deed		1625 (May 10)	Glagolitica II-33	HDA	Bribir				Jelena, udova Antona Kalafatića, kupuje kućište s pridvorima od Matije Županića.	IzSt (2008)
		1625 (September 14)	II c 77/e10	Arhiv HAZU	Kastav	2	28.2 x 19.5 cm		Oporuka. Scribe: Ivan Pavlinić.	
confirmations		1626–1643		Arhiv Zadarske nadbiskupije	Silba	33 p	29.5 x 10 cm	1 co		GUZ, PB
christenings, marriages, deaths		1626, 1637			Kučiće-Vinišće (Viganj)				Cyrillic except numbers of 2 years on 2 pages (f. 17r, 125r). Covers 1636 (July 15) – 1747 (December 17). Oldest parish register of Split archbishopric and only one with Glagolitic inclusions. Scribe of Glagolitic parts: Marko Kotrmanjić.	
annerversaries		1627–1719	VIII 202	Arhiv HAZU	Sveti Ivan od Šterne	79	30 x 10.5 cm		Godar župe Svetog Ivana od Šterne. Glagolitic with some Italian entries likely after the 1627–1689 Glagolitic period. Certainly completely Italian by 1705.	FS
		1627–1637	VIII 276	Arhiv HAZU	Vrbnik	110	42.5 x 30.5 cm		Notarski protokol Ivana Stašića. Manuscript once at the krčki sud. Acquired by Štefanić from Mate Oršić in 1931, given by Štefanić to JAZU in 1958. One photograph in Štefanić 1970.	
deed		1627 (May 20)	Glagolitica II-34	HDA	Vrhovec				Stana Novaković, udova Pavla, sa svojim kćerima prodaje vinograd i šumu Štefu Mihalcu i njegovim sinovima.	IzSt (2008)
deed		1627 (October 4)	Glagolitica II-35	HDA	Crikvenica				Sudac Grgur Katnić kupuje vinograd i njivu od Jurja Antića za 12 dukata.	IzSt (2008)
deed		1627 (October 4)	Glagolitica II-36	HDA	Crikvenica				Sudac Grgur Katnić kupuje vinograd "Pod Gorom" od popa Mikule Kovačića za 22 dukata.	IzSt (2008)
song		1600s (beginning)	IV a 80/30	Arhiv HAZU		3	19 x 14.2 cm		Pjesma o Gospinim žalostima. Given to Šime Deljić by a chaplain of Ugljan. Not written by Šime Delić contra Cvitanović.	
legal		1600s (beginning)	Sign. Gl. II. 49	Arhiv HAZU	Bakar				Nadstojnici crkve sv. Lucije u Kostreni daju vlahu Smolanu u nasljedni najam zemlju sv. Lucije, Župnicu zvanu. Survives in Glagolitic transcription in the Kukuljević collection. Original dated 18 March 1492.	
		1600s (beginning)	inv. br. 28	Baška (župni ured)		90	16.5 x 14.5 cm		O četiri posljednje stvari. Written at beginning of 17th century if not the year 1600.	
		1600s (beginning)		Glavotok	Glavotok	1	19.5 x 15 cm		Fragment peregrinova blagdanara. Paper.	
christenings, marriages, deaths		1630–1714	Inv. br. 537	DaZd	Krapanj	440 p			Christenings 1730-1706, marriages 1630–1714, deaths 1686–1712, christenings 1706–1712, 1713–1737, deaths 1728–1737, marriages 1715–1734, deaths 1715–1728. Latin with Glagolitic 1642–1652 and Cyrillic later (especially 1686–1694).	DaZd FS
marriages		1630–1646		Arhiv Zadarske nadbiskupije	Grusi (Briševo)		30 x 10.8 cm			
annerversaries		1630–1765			Mali Lošinj					
matricula		1630–1821		Pašman (župni ured)	Pašman (town)	510 p	28.4 x 20 cm		Madrikula Bratovštine s. Tila (Sakramenta). Completely Glagolitic excepting a little Latinic. Lost as of 2015.	
matricula		1630–1861		Zavičajni muzej u Biogradu	Tkon	122 p	32 x 22 cm		Madrikula Bratovštine Tila Isukrstova. Glagolitic and Latinic.	
		1630–1785		Zagreb (Zamostan franjevaca trećoredaca)	Zaglav	150 p	19.8 x 14.8 cm		Bratovština Gospe od Začeća na Zaglavu i u Žmanu.	
		1630–1724	inv. br. 1	Baška (župni ured)	Baška	124	28 x 20.5 cm		Opća kapitulska knjiga. Regular 1630–1665, sporadic use to 1724. Includes copy of a 1524 act. Paper.	
matricula		1630–1757		Arhiv Zadarske nadbiskupije	Molat	20 + 84 + 40 + 2 p	46.2 x 16 cm, 43.6 x 15.7 cm		Glagoljske madrikule 1630–1757. The first is the Madrikula Bratovštine Bl. Gospe od Karmena, beginning 1630 and remaining Glagolitic until page 15 inclusive, then Latinic on 17 and 19 but with Glagolitic note from 19 October 1794 on page 18. The second is the Madrikula Bratovštine Sv. Sakramenta i Bratovštine Sv. Marije Majke od Milosrđa from Brgulje, beginning 1757 and being Glagolitic until 1794 then Latinic. The third is the Madrikula Bratovštine sv. Mihovila beginning 1746 and remaining Glagolitic on pages 1-2 and 4-7 but the rest being Latinic. The fourth is the Madrikula Bratovštine sv. Luzarija, completely Glagolitic but only 2 pages.	
christenings		1631–1646		Arhiv Zadarske nadbiskupije	Grusi (Briševo)		30 x 10.8 cm			
		1631	V. 194	Trsat (Franjevački samostan)		2			Založnica popa Jurja Mnoškovića za dio trsja u korist Petra Marešića.	
matricula		1632–1886		Zaharija Benčić's personal library	Pašman	112	28.6 x 20 cm		Madrikula Bratovštine Bl. Gospe od Milosrđa 1632–1886. Once property of the Samostan sv. Duje in Kraj on Pašman. Now belongs to Zaharija Benčić of Zadar, by birth from Kraj, who stated he found it in his family's house.	
letters		1633.V	R 6258	NSK	Bribir				Dva Pisma Jurja Strižića (Two letters of Juraj Strižić).	NSK
will		1633			Drenovi				Oporuka riječkog kanonika Ivana Dardića. Lost as of Deković 2011.	
marriages, deaths		1643–1706			Murter	62 p			Completely Glagolitic. Includes free papers. Earliest date may be 1635.	FS
		1633–1653	Osor collection XVII	Krk	Osor	~600			Miscellanea. Latinic with 65 Glagolitic legal acts 1637–1649.	
		1633–1645	Osor collection X	Krk	Osor	835			Acta varia. Latinic with some Glagolitic supplements in final section written 1635–1636 (f. 769 forward Marci Antonii a Veritate Synodalia, et presentationes ad capellanias, et ordinationes).	
		1633	Osor collection XIV	Krk	Osor	700			Civilium. Latinic with ~40 Glagolitic supplements.	
deed		1633, 1661 (November 2)	Glagolitica II-37	HDA	Grižane				Ivan Barona kupuje jedno selište od zetova pokojnoga Ivana Bahorića. Includes 1661 note.	IzSt (2008)
		1634–1734	inv. br. 25	Poljica (župni ured)	Poljica	160	30.7 x 20.7 cm		Kapitulska knjiga: isprave. Glagolitic with some Italian.	
agreement		1634 (August 8)	R 6258	NSK	Bribir				Oporuka Matije Domjanića u Bribiru.	NSK
		1634 (December 16)	Spisi Ninske biskupije, kut. 1, br. 1	Arhiv Zadarske nadbiskupije		1			Scribe: fratar Mati Šlakić.	
		1634 (about)		Porat (samostan)	Dubašnica	8	22.6 x 15.8 cm		Levakovićev Liber psalmorum. Scribe: Rafael Levaković. Glagolitic and Latin.	IzSt (2008)
christenings		1635–1650	br. 689	Državni arhiv Zadar	Olib	64 p	30 x 10.5 cm	1 co	Together with other christenings registers. Parish priest Pavle Sikirić (1643–1663) sometimes uses jers, though irregularly.	DaZd, FS
act	AcGeo	1635	F. 67, No. 8	Russian National Library	Croatia				Darovnica svetoj Katarini pisara Jurja Črnića.	NLR
marriages		1636–1829	inv. br. 1624	DaZd	Bokanjac	28.6 x 9.8 cm			Marriages 1636–1829. Glagolitic to p 100 then Latinic.	DaZd
register		1637–1817		Pašman (župni ured)	Pašman (town)	190 p	30.5 x 21.5 cm		Completely Glagolitic. Lost.	
protocol		1637–1644, 1646	IV b 95	Arhiv HAZU		162	28.7 x 20.5 cm		Notarski protokol Ivana Stašića. Given to Arhiv JAZU by L. Geitler on 30 January 1882. Bibliography:	
homiliary		1637	R 3348 (St. sign. SM.32.F.6)	NSK	Croatia	179+7	27.8 x 20.6 cm	1 co	Postila.	NSK
will		1637 (July 6)	I br. 2	Šibenik (Gradski muzej)	Murter				Testament Antona Šeplina. Scribe: don Anton Šeplina.	
christenings		1638–1740	IX 2	Arhiv HAZU	Novalja	137	20 x 15 cm		Mostly Latinic 1638–1701 then mostly Glagolitic 1703–1733 then mostly Latinic 1733–1740.	
matricula		1638–1818	VIII 154	Arhiv HAZU	Sukošan	58	26.2 x 20.3 cm		Matrikula bratovštine Gospe od Karmena u Sutkošanu. Completely Glagolitic with 2 Cyrillic notes: one 1716 by priest Jerolim Vergada and one on back cover. Acquired by JAZU in February 1958 with the purchase of the Antikvarijat Poljoprivrednog nakladnog zavoda in Zagreb.	FS
homiliary		1638?	IV a 96	Arhiv HAZU	North Dalmatian islands	90	20.3 x 13.5 cm		Zbirka propovijedi. Written 1638 or maybe a little later. Bibliography:	
marriages		1640–1667	I d 94	Arhiv HAZU	Boljun	30	28.5 x 10 cm		Glagolitic to 1659 then Latinic.	FS
matricula		1640–1814		Arhiv Zadarske nadbiskupije	Sali	61 p	26.8 x 20.5 cm	1 co	Madrikula laičko-svećeničke skule sv. Karla Boromejskoga na Salima. Completely Glagolitic except for one Latin note from 1718. First entry 4 November 1640. Catalogued in the župni ured of Sali as R 2.	GUZ, PB
matricula		1640–1817		Državni arhiv u Zadru	Sveti Filip i Jakov	52 p	30.5 x 21 cm		Madrikula Bratovštine sv. Mihovila. Glagolitic and Latinic. Entries from earlier years are found at the end (1640–1655).	
christenings, marriages, souls, deaths		1640-	OR 68	Knjižnica Staroslavenskog instituta	Materada				Includes several Glagolitic interpolaations. It was given to the Knjižnica Staroslavenskog instituta by the Konzervatorski zavod of Rijeka in 1951.	
legal		1641–1661	R 4453	NSK	Bribir	15			Osam isprava notara Jurja Černića iz Bribira. Scribe: Juraj Černić.	
christenings, marriages, deaths		1642–1748	IX 20	Arhiv HAZU	Baška	313	30 x 20 cm		Deaths (1642–1737, 1742–1748), christenings (1653–1747), marriages (1653–1746).	
documents		1643–1743	R 6891	NSK	Baška	20			Listine koje se tiću Baške na otoku Krku. In Latinic with Glagolitic notes. Includes 11 separate manuscripts.	NSK, GHR
protocol		1643–1645, 1650	IV b 55	Arhiv HAZU	Vrbnik, Dobrinj, Risika	12	30 x 21 cm		Fragmenat notarskog protokola Anrija Toljanića. One photograph in Štefanić 1970. Bibliography:	
will		1643 (July 30)	I br. 3	Šibenik (Gradski muzej)	Prvić				Taštament Eline Grubelić. Scribe: fra Ivan Iglica. Photograph in Šupuk 1957.	
		1644–1780		Omišalj (župni ured)	Omišalj	192	21 x 15 cm		Prva kapitulska knjiga Omišlja. Once sent to Vienna. Includes copies of documents as old as 1560 but paper bears watermark from 1610 and 1664 is probably oldest entry.	
will		1644 (August 10, 10 June 1648)	I br.	Šibenik (Gradski muzej)	Murter				Taštament Luke Lučičina. Scribe: Luka Lučičin, with unknown hand adding date of death in 1648.	
protocol		1645–1652	IV b 45	Arhiv HAZU		175	30 x 20.4 cm		Notarski protocol Ivana Stašića 1645–1652. Begins 23 January 1645.	IzSt (2008)
		1645–1695	S.f. 49 / c.3	NUK	Dobrinj	24	22 x 16 cm		Knjižica bratovštine Sv. Marije od Ružarija na Dobrinju. Glagolitic with several Latinic notes.	IzSt (2017 from NUK)
will		1645 (April 18)	I br. 18	Šibenik (Gradski muzej)	Prvić-Šepurina				Taštament Ivana Skrozina. Scribe: fra Šimun Šemić.	
deed		1645 (April 21)	Glagolitica II-38	HDA	Bakar				Matej Pečarić kupuje kupuje kuću od Grgura Pećarića za 45 dukata.	IzSt (2008)
deaths		1646–1740		Diklo (župni ured)	Diklo	82 p	30 x 10.2 cm		Glagolitic to 1706 then Latinic or mixed.	
grant		1646	Glagolitica II-39	HDA	Grižane				Ivan Pilašić daruje Matiji Benko komad zemlje i stablo na međi Matijeve i njegove zemlje, a Matija Benko oprašta Ivanu Pilašiću dug i daje mu jedne hlače.	IzSt (2008)
breviary	BrVat₂₃	?	Vat. Slav. 23	Vatican Library	Croatia				Entered the Vatican Library in 1647.	
visitation		1647–1649	Osor collection XV	Krk	Osor	83, 33			Visitatio generalis totius dioecesis Valerii de Ponte Visitatoris Apostolici. 2 volumes. Latinic with 12 Glagolitic supplements from 1647 in inventories.	
christenings, marriages		1648, 1649, 1677–1704	VIII 158	Arhiv HAZU	Medulin	19	28 x 21 cm		Christenings (1648, 1649, 1677–1704) and marriages (1666–1690). Italian with f. 18 in Glagolitic dated 1648 and 1649.	
will		1648 (April 15)	I br. 6	Šibenik (Gradski muzej)	Krapanj				Taštament Kate Mišine. Scribe: don Mate Despot parish priest of Krapanj. She died 20 September 1648.	
will		1648 (May 17)	I br. 9	Šibenik (Gradski muzej)	Murter				Taštament Mande Igličine. Scribe: don Tomas Novoselić.	
will		1648 (June 25)	I br. 10	Šibenik (Gradski muzej)	Murter				Taštament Juriše Pavićeva. Scribe: don Tomas Novoselić.	
will		1648 (July 21)	I br.	Šibenik (Gradski muzej)	Murter				Taštamenat Stošije Markove. Scribe: don Tomas Novoselić.	
will		1648 (October 1)	I br. 12	Šibenik (Gradski muzej)	Murter				Taštamenat Mikule Sladina. Scribe: don Tomas Novoselić.	
will		1648 (December 16)	I br. 15	Šibenik (Gradski muzej)	Murter				Taštamenat Jive Matijaševa. Scribe: don Jivan Skračić.	
marriages		1649–1680	br. 698	Državni arhiv Zadar	Olib	33 p	30 x 11 cm	1 co	Facsimile published 2011. Bibliography:	DaZd, FS
will		1649 (March 15)	I br. 7	Šibenik (Gradski muzej)	Krapanj				Teštament Ele Bašelove. Scribe: don Mate Despot. Photograph in Šupuk 1957.	
will		1649 (August 31)	I br. 13	Šibenik (Gradski muzej)	Murter				Teštamenat Antona Šćavunova. Scribe: don Tomas Novoselić.	
		1649	IV b 43	Arhiv HAZU					Veprinački zapisi 1649. Last seen by Milčetić or Strohal.	
calendar		1659 (or 1649)	IV a 80/36	Arhiv HAZU	Bokanjac?	3	13 x 9 cm		Popis blagdana zadarske nadbiskupije. Scribe: don Jure Radinić. He wrote it for don Mate Baćica parish priest of Betina and Jezero (northwest of Šibenik). Jure Radinić was a parish register scribe in Bokanjac in 1664.	
song		1600s (first half; or 1700s)	VII 59	Arhiv HAZU	Zadar	22	19.5 x 14.5 cm		Plač Blažene D. Marije. Acquired by JAZU with Premuda archive in 1948. One photograph in Štefanić 1970. Scribe was likely a Franciscan. Bibliography:	
		1600s (first half)	III a 26 (Kuk. 338)	Arhiv HAZU	Cres/Lošinj	102	20.5 x 15 cm		Juraj Baraković: Jarula. Scribes: hand A f. 1-99, hand B 99v-101v. Written before 1663 and 1664. Includes notes. Acquired by Kukuljević in Franciscan monastery in Porta.	
homiliary		1600s (first half)	III b 11	Arhiv HAZU		239	27 x 20 cm		Postila Jurja Črnića. Written by same hand as the Ljubljana copy (II C. 166) and the copy in the Sveučilišna biblioteka (R 3348). Dialect ikavo-ekavian. Given to Mije Sabljar by kanonik Juraj Čor in Bribir, who gave it to Kukuljević. Two photographs in Štefanić 1970.	
miscellany		1600s (end)	IV a 21 (IV a 121)	Arhiv HAZU		42	20 x 15 cm		Zbornik duhovne građe (iz Divkovića, Kašića i drugo). Hand A f. 2-22 used a North Dalmatian cursive. Hand B belonged to the same school but was much younger and later, probably the middle 18th century. Manuscript once in Sukošan.	
homiliary		1600s (end)	IV a 140	Arhiv HAZU	North Dalmatia	124	21 x 14.5 cm		Zbirka propovijedi. Hand similar to that of Ivan Oštarić (who wrote IV a 98, IV a 125, IV a 136) but with notable differences. Notes at end written 1692–1693 in Lukoran on Ugljan. Bibliography:	
christenings, marriages, deaths		1650–1740		Medviđa (župni ured)	Medviđa				Destroyed by Partisans who set fire in May 1943 to the župski stan according to Šime Torbarrine. Covered Medviđa, Rodaljice, Ervenik, Nunić.	
protocol		1648–1674 (glag. 1650–1657)	Protocolla varia, br. 10d	Zagreb (Nadbiskupski arhiv)					Protokol Zagrebačke biskupije 1648–1674 (Juramenta parochorum zagreb. 1648–1674). Latin with 8 Glagolitic oaths by parish priests in the period 1650–1657.	
deaths		1649–1668	br. 702	DaZd	Olib	60 p	29.6 x 9.2 cm	1 co	Facsimile published 2011. Bibliography:	DaZd, FS
marriages		1650–1732	br. 1377	DaZd	Ugljan (town)	140 p	30 x 10 cm			DaZd, FS
christenings		1650–1681	br. 1043	Državni arhiv Zadar	Silba		27 x 9.8 cm		Glagolitic with sporadic Latinic.	DaZd, FS
christenings		1650–1673 (or 1651–1673)		Arhiv HAZU	Sali	100 p	29.5 x 9.5 cm			
christenings		1650–1666	br. 691	Državni arhiv Zadar	Olib	32 p	30 x 10.4 cm	1 co	Parish priest Pavle Sikirić sometimes uses jers.	DaZd, FS
marriages		1650–1694		Arhiv HAZU	Sali	100 p	29.5 x 9.5 cm			
marriages		1650–1808	br. 134	DaZd	Brbinj	141 p	29 x 10.5 cm			DaZd, FS
marriages		1650–1695		Arhiv Zadarske nadbiskupije	Silba	892 p	27 x 10 cm	1 co		GUZ, PB
deaths		1650–1696		Arhiv HAZU	Sali	84 p	29.5 x 9.5 cm		Includes a note on page 17 about the burial of some Sali parishioners killed by the Turks.	
deaths		1650–1668		Arhiv Zadarske nadbiskupije	Žman	24 p	28.4 x 10.1 cm	1 co		GUZ, PB, FS
confirmations		1650–1687 (or 1651–1687)		Arhiv HAZU	Sali	92 p	29.5 x 9.5 cm			
christenings, ledger		1651–1832		Arhiv Zadarske nadbiskupije	Vrgada		30 x 11 cm		Christenings 1651–1832 with fishing ledger. Glagolitic to 1811, Latinic from 1812 on. Latinic also used on 1727, 1798, 1808. Includes Glagolitic fishing ledger (Ribarski troškovnik, digitised at GUZ and PB) from period of transition to Latinic. The christenings ledger has been lost as of Kero 2015, but the fishing ledger survives.	FS
marriages		1651–1838	br. 1333	DaZd	Tkon	74 p	31 x 10 cm		4 bindings: 1st for marriages 15 September 1651 to 18 September 1656 and 26 February 1657 to 3 February 1664; 2nd marriages 5 November 1775 to 29 November 1782; 3rd for marriages 20 November 1792 to 16 September 1819; 4th for marriages 1803 to 1838. 3rd binding Glagolitic but Latinic for 1808–1818, 4th binding all Latinic.	DaZd FS
confirmations		1651–1804		Arhiv Zadarske nadbiskupije	Brbinj	53 p	30 x 9.9 cm	1 co		GUZ, PB
confirmations		1651–1786		Molat (župni ured)	Molat	103 p	28.9 x 10.2 cm			
marriages		1651–1822		Molat (župni ured)	Molat	212 p	29.1 x 10.3 cm		Glagolitic to 1806 then Latinic.	
marriages		1651–1668		Arhiv Zadarske biskupije	Žman	32 p	28.4 x 10.2 cm	1 co	Includes a decree mandating the use of the Latinic Kašićev ritual.	GUZ, PB
deaths		1651–1823		Molat (župni ured)	Molat	273 p	28.7 x 10.5 cm		Glagolitic to 1806 inclusive then Latinic.	
deaths		1651–1695	br. 1060	DaZd	Silba	65 p				DaZd
deaths		1651–1727		Arhiv Zadarske nadbiskupije	Savar	36 p	29.4 x 10 cm		Glagolitic. At the end there are confessions and communions (pages 37-44) qne christenings for the Gorica (Krnčina) parish 1680–1727 on pages 45-108.	
receipts and expenditures		1651–1679		Monastery of Saint Mary Magdalene in Porat, Krk	Dubašnica, Krk	188	29 x 20 cm		Blagajnička knjiga primitaka i izdataka.	
		1651–1653	II d 122	Arhiv HAZU					Veprinački zapisi 1651–1653. Last seen by Milčetić or Strohal.	
notes		1651, 1699, 1709, 1727, 1729, 1789		Vrgada (sakristija)	Vrgada				Glagolitic notes in a copy of the 1640 ritual of Bartol Kašić: 1651 by don Ivan Blasulović, exercises in Glagolitic and Latinic by Mikula Karpetin of Lapkat, 1699 by Pere Pletikosić, 1709, 1727, 1729 by don Jerolim "Jere" Vergada, 1789 by Ante Torić.	
christenings		1652–1668		Arhiv Zadarske nadbiskupije	Žman	32 p	28.5 x 9.8 cm	1 co		GUZ, PB, FS
christenings		1652–1662	br. 690	Državni arhiv Zadar	Olib	27 p	30 x 10 cm	1 co	Copy of 1650–1666 christenings register. Missing cover.	DaZd FS
deaths		1652–1812		Žman (župni ured)	Žman	184 p	29.6 x 11 cm		Completely Glagolitic.	
deaths		1652–1812	br. 136	DaZd	Brbinj	207 p				DaZd
deaths		1652–1721	inv. br. 31	DaZd	Banj	124 p	30.5 x 10.5 cm			DaZd, FS
documents		1653–1731	R 4505	NSK	Istria	12+2			Miscellanea Croato-glagolitica (Sedam isprava iz Istre). Includes 7 manuscripts, together with I. Kostial's Einige glagol. Schriftstücke (transcriptions).	NSK, GHR
christenings		1645–1671 (or 1654–1671)		Diklo (župni ured)	Diklo	60 p	29.8 x 10 cm			
		1654–1666	Osor collection XX	Krk	Osor	~200			Attestationum et licentiarum. Latinic with 60 Glagolitic supplements.	
souls		1654–1666	Osor collection XXI	Krk	Osor	~500			Status animarum et obligationum. 1st binding Italian, 2nd binding Glagolitic, 3rd binding completed masses of which 3 Glagolitic.	
will		1654 (January 14)	I br. 16	Šibenik (Gradski muzej)	Prvić				Taštament Grgura Šantića. Scribe: fra Mati Šlakić.	
confirmations		1655–1826	br. 1341	DaZd	Tkon	204 p	29 x 10 cm		Glagolitic for 1655–1786 (pp. 1–82), Latinic for pages 83–88, 135-152, 197-204.	DaZd, FS
confessions and communions		1655–1677 (or 1655–1671)	br. 2290	DaZd	Pašman	108 p	30 x 10 cm		Part of br. 600.	DaZd
grant		1655 (January 20)	Glagolitica II-40	HDA	Grižane				Matija Gašparović daruje Matiji Košulandiću jedan komad zemlje, a Matija njemu jednu ječermu dobroga sukna.	IzSt (2008)
		1655 (July 1)	I br. 14	Šibenik (Gradski muzej)	Murter				Ugovor o diobi. Scribe: don Tomas Novoselić.	
marriages		1656–1718		Premuda (župni ured)	Premuda	40 p	29.8 x 10.6 cm		Pages 9–16 are a fragment of the Olib marriage register from 1668. Lost as of 2015.	
ledger		1656 (September 10), 1659, 1664, 1674	I br. 17	Šibenik (Gradski muzej)	Prvić				Teretih fratara u Prviću. Scribe: fra Mati Šlakić..	
will		1656 (November 25)	I br. 28	Šibenik (Gradski muzej)	Tisno				Taštamenat dom Lovre Žaknića. Scribe: pop Martin Matešić.	
christenings		1657–1822		Molat (župni ured)	Molat	244 p	30.1 x 10.5 cm		Glagolitic.	
souls		1657–1809		Arhiv Zadarske nadbiskupije	Rava	84 p	28.5 x 11 cm		Ventarij od duš. Completely Glagolitic.	GUZ, PB
matricula		1657–1818		Sukošan?	Sukošan	198 p	28.2 x 20.2		Matricula of the Virgin Mary of Miracles. Glagolitic to 1800 then Latinic, with 4 Cyrillic rows in 1667. Glagolitic letter Onъ written with Latinic letter O. Lost as of 2015.	
souls, communions		1658–1790		Diklo (župni ured)	Diklo	160 p	29.8 x 10 cm		Libar duš. Completely Glagolitic. Souls 1658–1790, communions 1746–1790. The communions were written on slightly smaller pages.	
marriages		1658–1775	br. 1209	DaZd	Sukošan	320 p	29 x 10 cm		Glagolitic with Latinic index at end.	DaZd, FS
souls		1658–1808	br. 138	DaZd	Brbinj	165 p	30 x 11.6 cm		Libar broja od duš. Together with a 1919 Latinic transcription of the annerversaries by don Božo Čavlov in 1919.	DaZd, FS
protocol		1658–1692	Glagolitica 3.2	Croatian State Archives	Krk (town)	161			Protokol notara Antonija della Nave, Nicola dalla Nave i Giacoma dalla Nave. Fire damage.	IzSt (2008)
christenings		1658–1732	br. 1204	DaZd	Sukošan	430 p	29 x 10 cm		Glagolitic with one Cyrillic entry 1760.	DaZd
christenings		1658–1707			Murter	135 p			Completely Glagolitic.	FS
deaths		1658–1759	br. 1212	DaZd	Sukošan	352 p	29 x 9.5 cm	1 cp		DaZd, GUZ, PB, FS
		1658–1710, 1834, 1838, 1845	fond Ante Strgačić	Arhiv Zadarske nadbiskupije	Sali	138 p	36.5 x 13 cm	1 co	Libar lašov crkve svete Marije na Salima. Glagolitic with Latinic on pages 11 and 12 (written 1876), 56–58 and 78, Italian on 121 and 134. Some entries were transcribed from an older book (as early as 1624). Glagolitic to 1710, Latinic from 1834 on. Catalogued in the župni ured of Sali as R 4.	GUZ, PB
matricula		1658–1791		Arhiv Zadarske nadbiskupije	Sali	64 p	23 x 16.6 cm	1 co	Madrikula Braće zmorašnjeg kraja.	GUZ, PB
will		1659 (January 30)		DaZd	Sali				Oporuka Šimuna Vučića.	
will		1659 (March 21)		DaZd	Sali				Oporuka don Roka Bakotina.	
marriage		1659 (August 3)	IV a 80/47	Arhiv HAZU	Iž (sv. Petar church)	1	19.5 x 14 cm		Potvrda vjenčanja meju Jurum sinom Mikulom de Dominićem i meju Madom Škodovića. Scribe: Petar Marelić.	
registers		1623–1808	Glagolitica 16 + 17 + 18	Croatian State Archives	Vrbnik				Kutija 5: Notarijat Vrbnika. Includes multiple manuscripts. DVD exists at the Staroslavenski institu (DVD 4(HDA)) and the HDA (DVD 97). Divided into 1, 2, 3, 4 5, 6, 7, 8, 9. Bibliography:	
christenings		1659–1827	Inv. br. 272	DaZd	Sveti Filip i Jakov	230 p			Glagolitic to 1780 then Latinic. Cyrillic notes on pages 43 and 44.	FS
		1659–1779	HR–DAZD–359 (Obitelj Lantana collection) kut. 2 sign. 47	DaZd		186			Službena korespondencija i druga dokumentacija. Latinic with 3 Glagolitic folia (ff. 10, 11, 121). Part of Lantana family archive. Acquired by Državni arhiv u Zadru 1945.	
christenings		1660–1816			Nerezine				Glagolitic then Latinic.	
marriages		1660–1814			Nerezine				Glagolitic then Latinic.	
souls		1660–1772		Ugljan (town)	Ugljan (town)	350 p	29 x 9.5 cm		Libar o(d) duš.	FS
		1660, 1754–1807	19	Dobrinj (župni ured)	Dobrinj	79	31 x 22 cm		Knjiga svećeničke bratovštine sv. Petra. Glagolitic to latest entry dated 13 February 1807.	
		1660–1695	Zbirka glagolitica iz ostavštine Štefana Kocijančića, inv. br. 49	Ljubljana (Narodna i univerzitetska biblioteka)	Dobrinj	26			Knjiga bratovštine Gospoje od Ruzarija.	
		1660–1667	XI svezak	Krk (Stariji arhiv krčke biskupije)	Krk (town)	408			Akte biskupa Franje Marchi (1660–1667). Latinic with some Glagolitic.	
souls		1661–1694		Arhiv HAZU	Sali	180 p	29.5 x 9.5 cm		Libar od broja duš.	FS
christening		1661 (February 16)	Spisi Ninske biskupije, kut. 1, br. 2	Arhiv Zadarske nadbiskupije	Vir	1			Ja fra Ivan Herman parohijan od Vira krstih Šimu. Scribe: Ivan Herman.	
will		1661 (August 18)	I br. 54	Šibenik (Gradski muzej)	Murter				Taštamenat Kate Goline Scribe: pop Matij Vodanović.	
will		1661 (October 8)	I br. 55	Šibenik (Gradski muzej)	Murter				Taštament Ante Šimatova. Scribe: pop Matij Vodanović.	
will		1661 (October 18)	I br. 56	Šibenik (Gradski muzej)	Murter				Taštament Jerke Ćuzeline. Scribe: pop Matij Vodanović.	
will		1661 (November 11)	I br. 18	Šibenik (Gradski muzej)	Prvić				Taštamenat meštra Pere Bižige. Scribe: fra Mati Šlakić.	
will		1661 (November 15)	I br. 61	Šibenik (Gradski muzej)	Murter				Teštament Martina Zorzina. Scribe: pop Jadrij Skračić.	
will		1661 (November 19)	I br. 93	Šibenik (Gradski muzej)	Zlarin				Taštament Šime Lovrića. Scribe: don Mate Despot.	
		1661	V. 299	Trsat (Franjevački samostan)	Drivenik	1			Pismo plovana Frana Driveničkog, kojim samostanu Djevice Marije ostavlja nešto prihoda od vinograda u Dragi.	
christenings		1662–1693	br. 667	DaZd	Novigrad, Zadar County	149 p	29.2 x 10.4 cm		Mostly Glagolitic with some Cyrillic, Italian and Latin.	DaZd, FS
deaths		1662–1718		Premuda (župni ured)	Premuda	24 p	29.9 x 10.5 cm		Lost as of 2015.	
		1662–1691	br. 2	Vrbnik (župni ured)	Vrbnik	41	28.7 x 19.3 cm		Komad kapitulske knjige instrumenata.	
will		1662 (February 11)	I br. 94	Šibenik (Gradski muzej)	Zlarin				Taštament Ivana Obadića. Scribe: don Mate Despot.	
will		1662 (April 20)	I br. 62	Šibenik (Gradski muzej)	Murter				Taštament Martina Glamočića. Scribe: pop Jadrij Skračić.	
will		1662 (June 4)	I br. 63	Šibenik (Gradski muzej)	Murter				Taštament Perice Šćavunova. Scribe: pop Jadrij Skračić.	
will		1662 (July 1)	I br. 103	Šibenik (Gradski muzej)	Prvić				Taštament Ivanice kćeri pokojnoga Ive Klarića. Scribe: fra Ivan Herman.	
will		1662 (July 20)	I br. 57	Šibenik (Gradski muzej)	Murter				Taštament Grge Šikulina. Scribe: pop Matij Vodanović.	
will		1662 (August 12)	I br. 29	Šibenik (Gradski muzej)	Tisno				Taštamenat Stipana sina pokojnoga Mihovila Toljića. Scribe: pop Martin Matešić.	
will		1662 (August 29)	I br. 30	Šibenik (Gradski muzej)	Tisno				Taštamenat Stipana sina pokojnoga Matija Cvitina. Scribe: pop Martin Matešić.	
souls		1663–1824		Arhiv Zadarske nadbiskupije	Olib	104 p	29.5 x 20.9 cm	1 co	Glagolitic to 1789, then Latinic. Lost.	GUZ, PB
christenings		1663	br. 2291	DaZd	Sutomišćica	12 p	29 x 10 cm			DaZd
will		1663 (January 1)	I br. 64	Šibenik (Gradski muzej)	Murter				Taštament Tome Šimatova. Scribe: pop Jadrij Skračić.	
will		1663 (January 15)	I br. 95	Šibenik (Gradski muzej)	Zlarin				Taštament Mare Ljubine. Scribe: don Mate Despot.	
will		1663 (January 18)	I br. 65	Šibenik (Gradski muzej)	Murter				Taštament Jakova Šćavunova. Scribe: pop Jadrij Skračić.	
will		1663 (February 3)	I br. 31	Šibenik (Gradski muzej)	Tisno				Taštamenat Mate sina pokojnoga Luke Baćinovića. Scribe: pop Martin Matešić.	
will		1663 (March 2)	I br. 66	Šibenik (Gradski muzej)	Murter				Taštament Jele Siline. Scribe: pop Jadrij Skračić.	
will		1663 (April 12)	I br. 104	Šibenik (Gradski muzej)	Zlarin				Taštament Ivana sina pokojnoga Luke Braničeva. Scribe: don Matij Perošić.	
will		1663 (April 24)	I br. 112	Šibenik (Gradski muzej)	Primošten				Taštament Klare hćeri pokojnoga Ivana Japnarića. Scribe: pop Šimun Vučinović.	
will		1663 (April 28)	I br. 32	Šibenik (Gradski muzej)	Tisno				Taštamenat Stipana Štrkovića. Scribe: pop Martin Matešić.	
will		1663 (May 8)	I br. 105	Šibenik (Gradski muzej)	Zlarin				Taštament Tomasa Lovrića. Scribe: don Matij Perošić.	
will		1663 (November 13)	I br. 33	Šibenik (Gradski muzej)	Tisno				Kondicil Šimuna Čaglinova. Scribe: pop Martin Matešić.	
will		1663 (November 21)	I br. 19	Šibenik (Gradski muzej)	Prvić				Taštament Matie Alagina. Scribe: fra Mati Šlakić.	
will		1663 (December 6)	I br. 113	Šibenik (Gradski muzej)	Jezera (by Tisno)				Taštament Antona sina pokojnoga Mikule Šantića. Scribe: pop Šimun Vučinović.	
christenings		1664–1722	Inv. br. 1204		Sukošan	172 p				FS
deaths		1664–1739		Pakoštane (župni arhiv)	Dračevac-Crno (Dračevac Zadarski)	90 p	29 x 10 cm	1 co	Includes christenings for Radošinovci 1739–1741 (the only preserved parish register from Radošinovci). Pagination in 1825.	
will		1664 (January 23)	I br. 96	Šibenik (Gradski muzej)	Zlarin				Taštament Miše Heraka. Scribe: don Mate Despot.	
will		1664 (February 7)	I br. 34	Šibenik (Gradski muzej)	Tisno				Taštamenat Mare hćeri pokojnoga Mihe Muhića. Scribe: pop Martin Matešić.	
will		1664 (February 7)	I br. 35	Šibenik (Gradski muzej)	Tisno				Taštamenat Stipe sina pokojnoga Jivana Placarića. Scribe: pop Martin Matešić.	
will		1670 (February 10)	I br. 97	Šibenik (Gradski muzej)	Zlarin				Taštament Mande Krivinove. Scribe: don Mate Despot.	
will		1664 (March 14)	I br. 36	Šibenik (Gradski muzej)	Tisno				Taštamenat Jivana, sina pokojnoga Vida Toljića. Scribe: pop Martin Matešić.	
will		1664 (July 14)	I br. 37	Šibenik (Gradski muzej)	Tisno				Kondicil Jure sina pokojnoga Petra Čaglinova. Scribe: pop Martin Matešić.	
will		1664 (July 17)	I br. 20	Šibenik (Gradski muzej)	Prvić				Taštament Vida Antićeva. Scribe: fra Mati Šlakić.	
will		1664 (July 17)	I br.	Šibenik (Gradski muzej)	Prvić				Taštament Stipana Livića. Scribe: fra Mati Šlakić.	
will		1664 (August 4)	I br. 98	Šibenik (Gradski muzej)	Zlarin				Taštament Ivana Balina. Scribe: don Mate Despot.	
will		1664 (August 10)	I br. 99	Šibenik (Gradski muzej)	Zlarin				Taštament Anice Hadumove. Scribe: don Mate Despot.	
will		1664 (October 6)	I br. 100	Šibenik (Gradski muzej)	Zlarin				Taštament Stipe Jurasova. Scribe: don Mate Despot.	
		1664 (October 26)	I br. 67	Šibenik (Gradski muzej)	Murter				Štima po zapovidi gospodina kneza. A report in obeisance of the mandate of vojvoda Stipan. Scribe: pop Jadrij Skračić.	
will		1664 (December 16)	I br. 127	Šibenik (Gradski muzej)	Žirje				Taštament Mate Makarunića. Scribe: pop Pave Brnićev from Jezera.	
will		1665 (January 20)	I br. 38	Šibenik (Gradski muzej)	Tisno				Taštamenat Matije Baline. Scribe: pop Martin Matešić.	
will		1665 (April 6)	I br. 106	Šibenik (Gradski muzej)	Jezera (near Tisno)				Taštament Kate hćeri pokojnoga Matija Mihatova. Scribe: don Matij Perošić.	
will		1665 (April 6)	I br. 149	Šibenik (Gradski muzej)	Murter or Betina				Taštament dom Ivana Dehanova. Scribe: don Jure Magazin.	
will		1665 (July 9)	I br. 39	Šibenik (Gradski muzej)	Tisno				Taštamenat Mare žene pokojnoga Martina Fućina. Scribe: pop Martin Matešić.	
will		1665 (July 17)	I br. 128	Šibenik (Gradski muzej)	Žirje				Taštament Stipana Tabina. Scribe: pop Pave Brnićev of Jezera.	
will		1665 (August 5)	I br. 114	Šibenik (Gradski muzej)	Primošten				Taštament Martina sina Jivana Čobanova. Scribe: pop Šimun Vučinović.	
will		1665 (August 18)	I br. 115	Šibenik (Gradski muzej)	Primošten				Taštament Lucije hćeri Ivana Oglanova. Scribe: pop Šimun Vučinović.	
will		1665 (September 16)	I br. 101	Šibenik (Gradski muzej)	Zlarin				Taštament Ivana sina pokojnoga Filipa Bebanova. Scribe: don Mate Despot.	
will		1665 (December 5)	I br. 102	Šibenik (Gradski muzej)	Zlarin				Taštament Klarice žene pokojnoga Vicka Jakutinova. Scribe: don Mate Despot.	
christenings, confirmations, marriages, deaths		1666–1729	IX 12	Arhiv HAZU	Dobrinj	261	29.5 x 21 cm		Contains christenings (1667–1723), confirmations (1666–1729), marriages (1667–1720), deaths (1666–1718).	
christenings		1666–1813	br. 1330	DaZd	Tkon	294 p	31 x 12 cm		Glagolitic except Latinic for 1801–1802 (pp. 246–248), 1803 (p. 250), 1811–1813 (pp. 281–286).	DaZd, FS
christenings		1666–1668		Državni arhiv Zadar	Olib	11 p	30 x 10.3 cm	1 co	Facsimile published 2011.	
marriages		1666–1833	Inv. br. 524	DaZd	Kožino	96 p	41.8 x 15 cm		Glagolitic to 1784 inclusive then Latinic.	DaZd, FS
matricula		1666–1833		Pašman (župni ured)	Pašman (town)	196 p	28.7 x 20 cm		Madrikula Gospe Karmena. Completely Glagolitic excepting a little Latinic. Lost as of 2015.	
		1666–1717, 1724	inv. br. 2	Baška (župni ured)	Baška	408	30.5 x 20.5 cm		Opća kapitulska knjiga. Glagolitic with some Italian. Scribes: priests and the Vrbnik notary Ivan Volarić.	
will		1666 (March 5)	I br. 40	Šibenik (Gradski muzej)	Tisno				Taštamenat Mihe sina pokojnoga Tomasa Juretina. Scribe: pop Martin Matešić.	
will		1666 (March 16)	I br. 41	Šibenik (Gradski muzej)	Tisno				Taštament pokojne Matiěje Perojeve Scribe: pop Martin Matešić.	
will		1666 (March 29)	I br. 42	Šibenik (Gradski muzej)	Tisno				Taštamenat pokojne Gašpere Prhojeve. Scribe: pop Martin Matešić.	
will		1666 (May 6)	I br. 8	Šibenik (Gradski muzej)	Krapanj				Taštament Mate Despotovića. Scribe: don Mate Despot.	
will		1666 (June 7)	I br. 68	Šibenik (Gradski muzej)	Murter				Taštament Jure Šikina. Scribe: pop Jadrij Skračić.	
will		1666 (July 19)	I br. 22	Šibenik (Gradski muzej)	Prvić				Taštament Miše Rokića. Scribe: fra Mati Šlakić.	
will		1666 (August 6)	I br. 43	Šibenik (Gradski muzej)	Tisno				Taštamenat Martina Maračina. Scribe: pop Martin Matešić.	
will		1666 (September 20)	I br. 157	Šibenik (Gradski muzej)	Zlarin				Taštament Mande hćeri Jure Pritkovića. Scribe: don Gustin Vidulin Černarić.	
will		1666 (October 20)	I br. 23	Šibenik (Gradski muzej)	Prvić				Taštament Jure Skrozina. Scribe: fra Mati Šlakić.	
letter		1666 (November 3)	I br. 69	Šibenik (Gradski muzej)	Murter				Letter of Šime Grškov. Scribe: pop Jadrij Skračić.	
will		1666	I br. 70	Šibenik (Gradski muzej)	Murter				Teštament Šime Grškova. Scribe: pop Jadrij Skračić.	
christenings, marriages		1667–1699	IX 39	Arhiv HAZU	Kastav, Volosko	241	29.5 x 21 cm		Matica krštenih (1672–1699) i vjenčanih (1673–1699) župe Kastav i matica krštenih Voloskoga (1667–1674). Mixed Glagolitic and Latinic until the April 1678 command to stop from the bishop Bernardin Corneaneo of Pula then Latin but with Glagolitic entries continuing from parish priest Juraj Marot, Lovre Tonko and Jakov Pehanić, with the last Slavic Glagolitic entry on 17 January 1688. Unusually there was a 9 December 1696 Glagolitic entry in the Latin language.	FS
christenings, marriages, deaths		1667–1696			Primošten	48 p			Latinic with Glagolitic 1685–1696.	FS
souls		1667–1840, 1847–1850	Inv. br. 528	DaZd	Kožino	110 p	41.8 x 13.2 cm		Glagolitic to 1783 then Latinic and Italian from 1784.	DaZd, FS
deaths		1667–1833	Inv. br. 526	DaZd	Kožino	110 p	42 x 14.5 cm		Glagolitic to 1784 inclusive then Latinic.	DaZd, FS
matricula		1667–1839, 1851–1857, 1871		Arhiv Zadarske nadbiskupije	Sali	104 p	42.5 x 15.5 cm	1 co	Matrikula skule Gospe od Ruzarija na Salima. Glagolitic first part (which ends 1839), then pause, resumed 1851 but in Italian. Oldest entry from 9 December 1667. But it is difficult to tell if this was the original or in part a transcription of an older book. Catalogued in the župni ured of Sali as R 7.	GUZ, PB
marriages		1667–1692	br. 673	DaZd	Novigrad, Zadar County	38 p	29.4 x 11 cm		Completely Glagolitic.	DaZd, FS
christenings, marriages, deaths		1667–1896	br. 909	DaZd	Primošten				Latinic with some Glagolitic.	DaZd
protocol		1667–1692	Glagolitica 3.1	Croatian State Archives	Krk (town)	223			Protokol notara Girolama Cicuta. Fire damage.	IzSt (2008)
will		1667 (February 15)	I br. 158	Šibenik (Gradski muzej)	Zlarin				Teštament Vicenca Kelemenova. Scribe: don Gustin Vidulin Černarić.	
will		1667 (May 13)	I br. 71	Šibenik (Gradski muzej)	Murter				Taštament Šimuna Rabojeva. Scribe: pop Jadrij Skračić.	
will		1667 (June 10)	I br. 159	Šibenik (Gradski muzej)	Zlarin				Teštament Mate Juranovića. Scribe: don Gustin Vidulin Černarić.	
will		1667 (June 13)	I br. 44	Šibenik (Gradski muzej)	Tisno				Taštamenat Mare hćere pokojnoga Mate Mahovovića. Scribe: pop Martin Matešić.	
will		1667 (June 21)	I br. 45	Šibenik (Gradski muzej)	Tisno				Taštamenat Mikulote hćere pokojnoga Antona Gizdelina. Scribe: pop Martin Matešić.	
will		1667 (September 13)	I br. 107	Šibenik (Gradski muzej)	Jezera				Taštament Martina, sina pokojnoga Šimuna Meštrova. Scribe: don Matij Perošić.	
will		1667 (September 14)	I br. 160	Šibenik (Gradski muzej)	Zlarin				Teštament Šimuna Dejana. Scribe: don Gustin Vidulin Černarić.	
will		1667 (November 24)	I br. 140	Šibenik (Gradski muzej)	Murter or Betina				Taštament Petra Guberinova Scribe: don Jure Magazin.	
		1667			Nerezine				Oporuka Martine Jafića.	
marriages		1668–1799		Arhiv Zadarske nadbiskupije	Žman	108 p	30.3 x 10.5 cm	1 co		GUZ, PB
		1668–1673	Osor collection XXXI	Krk	Osor	~350			Miscellanea. Latinic with 38 Glagolitic isprave and Glagolitic 7 folio Libar ot reversari 1672 jenara.	
christenings		1668–1832	br. 1615	DaZd	Žman	380 p	30 x 10.5 cm		Completely Glagolitic.	
christenings		1668–1698 (or 1668–1695)	br. 1044	DaZd	Silba	55 p				DaZd
deaths		1668–1830	br. 1618	DaZd	Žman	219 p	28.5 x 10 cm		Completely Glagolitic, but no deaths 1806–1826.	
ledger		1668–1685		Zagreb (Sv. Ksaver monastery)	Glavotok				Blagajnička bilježnica fra Frana Depopa. Scribe: Fran Depop.	
will		1668 (January 8)	I br. 24	Šibenik (Gradski muzej)	Prvić				Taštamet Šime Rokića. Scribe: fra Mati Šlakić. Photograph in Šupuk 1957.	
will		1668 (January 16)	I br. 46	Šibenik (Gradski muzej)	Tisno				Taštamenat pokojnoga Stipana Ćaberice. Scribe: pop Martin Matešić.	
will		1668 (April 17)	I br. 108	Šibenik (Gradski muzej)	Tisno				Taštamenat Jerolima sina pokojnoga Mihovila Meštrovića. Scribe: don Matij Perošić.	
will		1668 (July 29)	I br. 109	Šibenik (Gradski muzej)	Jezera				Taštament Mihe sina pokojnoga Antona Vučinovića. Scribe: don Matij Perošić.	
will		1668 (August 28)	I br. 181	Šibenik (Gradski muzej)	Prvić				Taštament Frane Petkovića. Scribe: fra Juraj Sladić.	
will		1668 (September 2)	I br. 72	Šibenik (Gradski muzej)	Murter				Taštament Mate Bokanova. Scribe: pop Jadrij Skračić.	
will		1668 (September 24)	I br. 47	Šibenik (Gradski muzej)	Tisno				Taštamenat Antona Perojeva. Scribe: pop Martin Matešić.	
will		1668 (December 9)	I br. 151	Šibenik (Gradski muzej)	Betina				Taštament Šimice Raojeva Scribe: don Jure Magazin.	
		1668–1676 (during)	Spisi Ninske biskupije, kut. 1, br. 2a	Arhiv Zadarske nadbiskupije					Decree of Francesco Grassi bishop of Nin. Written 10 July of an unknown year	
will		1669 (January 7)	I br. 25	Šibenik (Gradski muzej)	Prvić				Taštament Martina Lučeva. Scribe: fra Mati Šlakić.	
will		1669 (January 18)	I br. 48	Šibenik (Gradski muzej)	Tisno				Taštamenat Luke sina pokojnoga Mateše Meštrovića. Scribe: pop Martin Matešić.	
will		1669 (March 15)	I br. 49	Šibenik (Gradski muzej)	Tisno				Taštamenat Jeline Šimatove. Scribe: pop Martin Matešić.	
marriages		1670–1745	IX 32	Arhiv HAZU	Mali Lošinj	82	30 x 20.4 cm		Glagolitic to 25 February 1732 then Italian.	1: FS, 2: FS
souls		1670–1812		Molat (župni ured)	Molat	326 p	30.2 x 10.2 cm		Completely Glagolitic.	
souls		1670–1694		Arhiv Zadarske nadbiskupije	Žman		30 x 11.6 cm			GUZ, PB, FS
protocol		1670–1675	br. 35	Vrbnik (župni ured)	Vrbnik	62	30.3 x 20.3 cm		Protokol notara Ivana Stašića.	
		1670–1715	br. 6 b	Vrbnik (župni ured)	Vrbnik	22	30.5 x 10 cm		Miscellanea.	
will		1670 (January 13)	I br. 73	Šibenik (Gradski muzej)	Murter				Taštament Jivana Šimatova. Scribe: pop Jadrij Skračić.	
will		1670 (February 15)	I br. 74	Šibenik (Gradski muzej)	Murter				Taštament Mare hćeri pokojnoga Petra Barbašanova. Scribe: pop Jadrij Skračić.	
will		1670 (March 2)	I br. 161	Šibenik (Gradski muzej)	Zlarin				Teštament Miše Miškova. Scribe: don Gustin Vidulin Černarić.	
will		1670 (March 8)	I br. 110	Šibenik (Gradski muzej)	Jezera (near Tisno)				Taštament Luke sina pokojnoga Jadrija Hrivatinova. Scribe: don Matij Perošić.	
will		1670 (July 8)	I br. 162	Šibenik (Gradski muzej)	Zlarin				Teštament Mate Juranovića. Scribe: don Gustin Vidukin Černarić.	
will		1670 (August 9)	I br. 75	Šibenik (Gradski muzej)	Murter				Tašatement Marte Juranove. Scribe: Jadrij Skračić.	
will		1670 (September 9)	I br. 76	Šibenik (Gradski muzej)	Murter				Taštament Jive Boškina. Scribe: pop Jadrij Skračić.	
will		1670 October 18)	I br. 184	Šibenik (Gradski muzej)	Prvić				Taštament Antona Mačukata. Scribe: fra Mikel Lušić.	
deed		1670 (December 11)	Glagolitica II-42	HDA	Panač?				Pop Mikula Čubranić prodaje komad zemlje popu Mihovilu Šeršiću.	IzSt (2008)
will		1670 (December 30)	I br. 163	Šibenik (Gradski muzej)	Zlarin				Teštament pokojne Gašpe kćere pokojnoga Špadine. Scribe: don Gustin Vidulin Černarić.	
christenings		1671–1833 (or 1677–1833)	Inv. br. 523	DaZd	Kožino	200 p	42 x 13.8 cm		Glagolitic to 1784 inclusive then Latinic.	DaZd, FS
christenings		1671–1744		Diklo (župni ured)	Diklo	108 p	30.7 x 10.4 cm		Completely Glagolitic.	
protocol		1671–1799	VIII 249 (or VIII 248)	Arhiv HAZU		41	31.5 x 21.8 cm		Protokol od Bašćenici po. Franića Milčetića s prilozima. Arrived at Arhiv JAZU in 1958 through Antun Kraljić.	
ledger		1671–1678	Glagolitica I-7	HDA	Porozina	8	11.5 x 8.5 cm		Izdaci i primici samostana Sv. Mikule na Porozini na Cresu. Fragment. Acquired by HDA from Fanfogna-Garanin family library.	IzSt (2008), IzSt (2008)
marriages		1671–1681	br. 705	DaZd	Olib	23 p	30.6 x 15 cm	1 co	Begins 20 February 1671. Facsimile published 2011.	DaZd FS
will		1671 (March 30)	I br. 152	Šibenik (Gradski muzej)	Betina				Taštament Mare hćeri pokojnoga Jadre Burtinova. Scribe: don Jure Magaizn.	
will		1671 (April 6)	I br. 77	Šibenik (Gradski muzej)	Murter				Taštament Grge Nadričića. Scribe: Jadrij Skračić. The Glagolitic original gives 1671, but the Italian translation incorrectly gives 1670.	
will		1671 (April 6)	I br. 182	Šibenik (Gradski muzej)	Prvić				Tastament Filipa Lučeva. Scribe: fra Mikel Lušić.	
will		1671 (April 16)	I br. 78	Šibenik (Gradski muzej)	Murter				Taštament Kate hćeri pokojnoga Martina Trapilova. Scribe: pop Jadrij Skračić.	
will		1671 (May 3)	I br. 27	Šibenik (Gradski muzej)	Prvić				Taštament Ive Mihatova. Scribe: fra Mati Šlakić.	
will		1671 (May 15)	I br. 116	Šibenik (Gradski muzej)	Tisno				Taštament Antona sina pokojnoga Luke Gizdelinova. Scribe: pop Šimun Vučinović.	
will		1671 (May 28)	I br. 79	Šibenik (Gradski muzej)	Murter				Taštament Kate žene pokojnoga Grge Gržanova. Scribe: pop Jadrij Skračić.	
will		1671 (July 13)	I br. 50	Šibenik (Gradski muzej)	Tisno				Taštamenat Šimuna sina pokojnoga Grge Ciplova. Scribe: pop Martin Matešić.	
will		1671 (July 26)	I br. 51	Šibenik (Gradski muzej)	Tisno				Taštamenat pokojnoga Jakova Sviduljeva. Scribe: pop Martin Matešić.	
will		1671 (September 4)	I br. 183	Šibenik (Gradski muzej)	Prvić				Taštament Martina Ćaćanovića. Scribe: fra Mikel Lušić.	
will		1671 (September 9)	I br. 187	Šibenik (Gradski muzej)	Prvić				Taštament Filipa Antićeva. Scribe: fra Jadri Pecić.	
will		1671 (September 18)	I br. 153	Šibenik (Gradski muzej)	Betina				Taštament Šime Nadrčića. Scribe: don Jure Magazin.	
will		1671 (September 30)	I br. 80	Šibenik (Gradski muzej)	Murter				Taštament Anice hćeri pokojnoga Jive Matićeva. Scribe: pop Jadrij Skračić.	
will		1671 (October 19)	I br. 111	Šibenik (Gradski muzej)	Jezera (near Tisno)				Tađtament Jeline, hćeri pokojnoga Boginovića. Scribe: don Matij Perošić.	
will		1671 (November 1)	I br. 164	Šibenik (Gradski muzej)	Zlarin				Teštament Frane Bebanova. Scribe: don Gustin Vidulin Černarić.	
will		1671 (November 16)	I br. 186	Šibenik (Gradski muzej)	Prvić				Taštament Kate Bilosović. Scribe: fra Jadri Pecić.	
will		1671 (December 6)	I br. 165	Šibenik (Gradski muzej)	Zlarin				Teštament Mate Krivinova. Scribe: don Gustin Vidulin Černarić.	
will		1671 (December 27)	I br. 129	Šibenik (Gradski muzej)	Jezera				Taštament Jakovice žene pokojnoga Jure Ćohlina. Scribe: pop Pave Brnićev.	
christenings, marriages		1672–1721	Matične knjige br. 1526	HDA	Vrhovac				Glagolitic from first note 30 November 1672 to 1683, Latinic from 1685 on. Came to HDA before most parish registers did in 1959–1962.	
will		1672 (January 4)	I br. 185	Šibenik (Gradski muzej)	Prvić				Taštament Petra Šantića. Scribe: fra Mikel Lušić.	
will		1672 (March 12)	I br. 166	Šibenik (Gradski muzej)	Zlarin				Teštament Luce Alesine. Scribe: don Gustin Vidulin Černarić.	
will		1672 (March 30)	I br. 154	Šibenik (Gradski muzej)	Betina				Taštament Jeline Strikelića. Scribe: don Jure Magazin.	
will		1672 (April 1)	I br. 117	Šibenik (Gradski muzej)	Tisno				Taštament Kate kćeri pokojnoga Mikule Pehrinova. Scribe: pop Šimun Vučinović.	
will		1672 (July 24)	I br. 167	Šibenik (Gradski muzej)	Zlarin				Teštament Miše Barina. Scribe: don Gustin Vidulin Černarić.	
will		1672 (September 5)	I br. 168	Šibenik (Gradski muzej)	Zlarin				Teštament Jure Mišurine. Scribe: don Gustin Vidulin Černarić.	
will		1672 (October 20)	I br. 169	Šibenik (Gradski muzej)	Zlarin				Teštament Filipa Dejana. Scribe: don Gustin Vidulin Černarić.	
will		1672 (November 9)	I br. 81	Šibenik (Gradski muzej)	Murter				Taštament Barice hćeri pokojnoga Jivana Despotova. Scribe: pop Jadrij Skračić.	
christenings		1673–1731	br. 1374	DaZd	Ugljan (town)	270 p	28.8 x 10 cm		Glagolitic with a Cyrillic note by Marko Rugomentić on inside of cover.	DaZd, FS
school		1673–1818		Arhiv Zadarske nadbiskupije	Sukošan	108 p	41.2 x 14 cm	1 co	Glagoljska Skula sv. Antona. Glagolitic to 1786 then Latinic. Cyrillic on wrapper.	GUZ, PB
		1673–1719	Osor collection XXXV	Krk	Osor	~600			Attestationum et licentarium. Latinic with Glagolitic 145 testimonies from 1673–1706 and occasional Glagolitic supplements.	
souls		1673–1704	Osor collection XXXVII	Krk	Osor	~300			Status animarum. Latinic with 85 Glagolitic supplements.	
will		1673 (January 15)	I br. 118	Šibenik (Gradski muzej)	Tisno				Taštament Antona sina pokojnoga Petra Baćinovića. Scribe: pop Šimun Vučinović.	
will		1673 (February 5)	I br. 82	Šibenik (Gradski muzej)	Murter				Taštament Mate Belina. Scribe: pop Jadrij Skračić.	
will		1673 (April 8)	I br. 170	Šibenik (Gradski muzej)	Zlarin				Teštament Jakova Bujasa. Scribe: don Gustin Vidulin Černarić.	
will		1673 (June 16)	I br. 52	Šibenik (Gradski muzej)	Tisno				Taštamenat Pere sina pokojnoga Vida Burina. Scribe: pop Martin Matešić.	
will		1673 (June 18)	R 6258	NSK	Bribir				Oporuka popa Frana Plovanića. In Latinic but with Glagolitic ending.	NSK
will		1673 (July 22)	I br. 155	Šibenik (Gradski muzej)	Betina				Taštament Mihe Tomasova. Scribe: don Jure Magazin.	
will		1673 (July 31)	I br. 188	Šibenik (Gradski muzej)	Tribunj				Taštament Jivanice pokojnoga Jadrija Marianova. Scribe: don Anton Belić.	
will		1673 (August 2)	I br. 171	Šibenik (Gradski muzej)	Zlarin				Teštament Mikule Lovrića. Scribe: don Gustin Vidulin Černarić.	
will		1673 (August 10)	I br. 156	Šibenik (Gradski muzej)	Betina				Taštament Šime sina pokojnoga Pere Mikina. Scribe: don Jure Magazin.	
will		1673 (September 2)	I br. 130	Šibenik (Gradski muzej)	Jezera (by Tisno)				Taštament Luke Petrinova. Scribe: pop Pave Brnić.	
will		1673 (September 21)	I br. 131	Šibenik (Gradski muzej)	Jezera (by Tisno)				Taštamet Mikule sina pokojnoga Luke Petrinova. Scribe: pop Pave Brnićev.	
will		1673 (October 2)	I br. 119	Šibenik (Gradski muzej)	Tisno				Taštament Jadre sina pokojnoga Stipana Despotova. Scribe: pop Šimun Vučinović.	
will		1673 (October 14)	I br. 53	Šibenik (Gradski muzej)	Tisno				Taštamenat Filipa sina pokojnoga Vida Morina. Scribe: pop Martin Matešić.	
will		1673 (November 20)	I br. 172	Šibenik (Gradski muzej)	Zlarin				Teštament Jakova Dobrina. Scribe: don Gustin Vidulin Černarić.	
will		1673 (December 18)	I br. 83	Šibenik (Gradski muzej)	Murter				Taštament Šime Mudronjina. Scribe: pop Jadrij Skračić.	
births		1674–1827	br. 1024	DaZd	Sali	424 p	43 x 15 cm	1 co	Glagolitic until the visit of archbishop Novak on 12 July 1825, after that Latinic.	DaZd, FS
		1674–1705, 1776–1778	inv. br. 23	Poljica (župni ured)	Poljica	20	29.8 x 21 cm		Christenings (1674–1705) and deaths (1776–1778). Completely Glagolitic.	
ledger		1674–1763	inv. br. 23	Baška (župni ured)	Baška	157	20.5 x 15.5 cm		Knjiga računa Gospoje od Karmene i sv. Antona od Padove. Glagolitic with some Italian.	
will		1674 (February 7)	I br. 132	Šibenik (Gradski muzej)	Jezera (by Tisno)				Taštamet Mande žene pokojnoga Martina Jurjeva. Scribe: pop Pave Brnić.	
will		1674 (August 20)	I br. 189	Šibenik (Gradski muzej)	Tribunj				Taštamenat Mate sina pokojnoga Jadrija Matičeva. Scribe: don Anton Belić.	
will		1674 (August 26)	I br. 190	Šibenik (Gradski muzej)	Tribunj				Taštament Mare Šilojevića. Scribe: don Anton Belić.	
will		1674 (September 17)	I br. 197	Šibenik (Gradski muzej)	Prvić				Taštament Kate Čičina pokojnoga Jure Čičina. Scribe: fra Lovrenco Škrpčić.	
will		1674 (October 3)	I br. 198	Šibenik (Gradski muzej)	Prvić				Taštament Martina Skrozina. Scribe: fra Šime Ugrinović.	
will		1674 (October 24)	I br. 84	Šibenik (Gradski muzej)	Murter				Taštament Jerke žene Tome Dorotijina. Scribe: pop Jadrij Skračić.	
will		1674 (December 13)	I br. 173	Šibenik (Gradski muzej)	Zlarin				Teštament Mare Kažijine od Zlarina. Scribe: don Gustin Vidulin Černarić.	
will		1674 (December 30)	I br. 58	Šibenik (Gradski muzej)	Žirje				Taštament Jure Jivančeva. Scribe: pop Matij Vodanović.	
matricula		1675 – after 1949		Arhiv Zadarske nadbiskupije	Kali	130 p	29.5 x 20.5 cm	1 co	Madrikula Bratovštine svetog Sakramenta. Glagolitic to 1813 inclusive then Latinic. One of the last manuscripts with Glagolitic to be in use for records. Bibliography:	GUZ, PB
letter		1675 (May 6)	I br. 201	Šibenik (Gradski muzej)	Tisno				Letter of Stipan Fućin and Jure Pavić. Scribe: don Tome Frkić.	
will		1675 (October 15)	I br. 85	Šibenik (Gradski muzej)	Murter				Taštament Mare hćeri pokojnoga Jerolima Belina. Scribe: pop Jadrij Skračić.	
will		1675 (October 30)	I br. 174	Šibenik (Gradski muzej)	Zlarin				Teštament Frane Jurjeva. Scribe: Gustin Vidulin Černarić.	
will		1675 (November 12)	I br. 133	Šibenik (Gradski muzej)	Jezera (by Tisno)				Taštamet Grge Friganova. Scribe: pop Pave Brnić.	
will		1675 (December 10)	I br. 134	Šibenik (Gradski muzej)	Jezera (by Tisno)				Taštamet Ante sina pokojnoga Ivana Šemina. Scribe: pop Pave Brnić.	
marriages		1676–1729, 1741–1742		Arhiv Zadarske nadbiskupije	Gorica (Gornje Raštane)	82 p	30 x 10.4 cm	1 co	Marriages in sv. Petar in Krnčina until 3 December 1729, then in sv. Ivan in Gorica from 10 November 1741 on.	GUZ, PB
will		1676 (February 28)	I br. 175	Šibenik (Gradski muzej)	Zlarin				Teštament Jive Periěe. Scribe: don Gustin Vidulin Černarić.	
will		1676 (April 2)	I br. 176	Šibenik (Gradski muzej)	Zlarin				Teštament Garge Smihinjina. Scribe: don Gustin Vidulin Černarić.	
will		1676 (April 15)	I br. 199	Šibenik (Gradski muzej)	Prvić				Taštamenat Jure Kalavara. Scribe: fra Šime Ugrinović.	
will		1676 (April 15)	I br. 59	Šibenik (Gradski muzej)	Žirje				Taštamenat Mate Jivančeva. Scribe: pop Matij Vodanović.	
will		1676 (April 24)	I br. 177	Šibenik (Gradski muzej)	Zlarin				Teštament Martina Grega od Zlarina. Scribe: pop Gustin Vidulin Černarić.	
will		1676 (June 26)	I br. 202	Šibenik (Gradski muzej)	Prvić				Taštament Mare Kolovarine. Scribe: don Tome Frkić.	
will		1676 (July 10)	I br. 135	Šibenik (Gradski muzej)	Jezera (by Tisno)				Taštamet popa Stipana Stipanovića.	
will		1676 (August 22)	I br. 178	Šibenik (Gradski muzej)	Zlarin				Taštament Tome Kukure od Zlarina. Scribe: don Gustin Vidulin Černarić.	
will		1676 (September 12)	I br. 179	Šibenik (Gradski muzej)	Zlarin				Taštament Mate Ilijina od Zlarina. Scribe: don Gustin Vidulin Černarić.	
will		1676 (September 12)	I br. 180	Šibenik (Gradski muzej)	Zlarin				Taštament Jive Bebe od Zlarina. Scribe: don Gustin Vidulin Černarić.	
will		1676 (December 3)	I br. 86	Šibenik (Gradski muzej)	Murter				Taštament Mande Papešine. Scribe: pop Jadrij Skračić.	
will		1676 (December 10)	I br. 120	Šibenik (Gradski muzej)	Tisno				Taštament Luke sina pokojnoga Ivana Mihića. Scribe: pop Šimun Vučinović.	
		1677–1798		Krk (župni ured)	Dobrinj	67	30.7 x 20.5 cm		Knjiga beneficija kapele sv. Križa u Krku. Italian with Glagolitic acts 26 June 1678, 4 September 1678, 28 February 1679. Glagolitic portions written by notary Šimun Gržetić in Dobrinj.	
will		1677 (January 15)	I br. 136	Šibenik (Gradski muzej)	Jezera (by Tisno)				Taštament Antona Čohlina. Scribe: pop Pave Brnić.	
will		1677 (February 10)	I br. 203	Šibenik (Gradski muzej)	Prvić				Scribe: .	
will		1677 (April 27)	I br. 205	Šibenik (Gradski muzej)	Zlarin				Taštament Jive Jiglice od Zlarina. Scribe: don Ivan Oštarić.	
will		1677 (June 8)	I br. 137	Šibenik (Gradski muzej)	Jezera (by Tisno)				Taštamet Kate žene pokojnoga Bare Šantića. Scribe: pop Pave Brnić.	
will		1677 (June 20)	I br. 206	Šibenik (Gradski muzej)	Zlarin				Taštament Stipe Lovrića od Zlarina. Scribe: don Ivan Oštarić.	
will		1677 (August 3)	I br. 87	Šibenik (Gradski muzej)	Murter				Taštament Ante Kalebova. Scribe: pop Jadrij Skračić. Photograph in Šupuk 1957.	
will		1677 (October 7)	I br. 207	Šibenik (Gradski muzej)	Zlarin				Taštament Jive Pavlova deto Lene od Zlarina. Scribe: don Ivan Oštarić. Photograph in Šupuk 1957.	
will		1677 (September 10)	I br. 88	Šibenik (Gradski muzej)	Murter				Taštament don Jive Jakovčeva. Scribe: pop Jadrij Skračić.	
will		1677 (December 12)	I br. 216	Šibenik (Gradski muzej)	Šepurina				Taštament Stipe Ćaćanovića. Scribe: fra Miho Grubelić.	
christenings		1678–1745		Arhiv Zadarske nadbiskupije	Gorica (Raštane)	124 p	28.4 x 10 cm		Glagolitic to 1807 then Latinic. The sacraments were at the crkva sv. Petra in Krnčina until the last christening there on 1 November 1730 then after that in sv. Ivana in Gorica with the first christening there being on 25 November 1730.	
deaths		1678–1709	br. 1380	DaZd	Ugljan (town)	48 p	29.4 x 9.9 cm			DaZd, FS
matricula		1678-		Arhiv Zadarske nadbiskupije	Kali	20 p	27.8 x 19.5 cm	1 co	Matricula of the Brotherhood of the Holy Sacrament and Holy Cross (Madrikula bratovština svetog Sakramenta i svetog Križa). Fragments.	GUZ, PB
will		1678 (January 3)	I br. 191	Šibenik (Gradski muzej)	Tribunj				Taštamenat Lovre Šilojevića. Scribe: don Ante Belić.	
will		1678 (April 9)	I br. 208	Šibenik (Gradski muzej)	Zlarin				Teštament Mande žene pokojnoga Šime Bebana od Zlarina. Scribe: don Ivan Oštarić.	
		1678 (May 16)	Spisi Ninske biskupije, kut. 1, br. 5	Arhiv Zadarske nadbiskupije	Church of sv. Stipan na Luci na Jižuli Groši in Zadar territory	1			Scribe: don Grgo Colman.	
		1678 (May 17)	Spisi Ninske biskupije, kut. 1, br. 3/4	Arhiv Zadarske nadbiskupije	Nin	2			Decree of bishop of Nin.	
		1678 (July 28)	Spisi Ninske biskupije, kut. 1, br. 6/7	Arhiv Zadarske nadbiskupije	Nin	1			Decree of Marko Balbi knez of Nin. Italian with Glagolitic translation.	
will		1678 (July 31)	I br. 138	Šibenik (Gradski muzej)	Jezera (by Tisno)				Taštamet Mate Šantića. Scribe: pop Pave Brnić..	
		1678 (September 2)	Spisi Ninske biskupije, kut. 1, br. 8	Arhiv Zadarske nadbiskupije		1			Decree of bishop of Nin.	
will		1678 (september 26)	I br. 192	Šibenik (Gradski muzej)	Tribunj				Taštamenat Martina Alagina. Scribe: don Ante Belić.	
will		1678 (November 14)	I br. 139	Šibenik (Gradski muzej)	Jezera (by Tisno)				Taštament Mihe Božina. Scribe: pop Pave Brnić.	
		1678 (? 24th)	Spisi Ninske biskupije, kut. 1, br. 9	Arhiv Zadarske nadbiskupije		1			Scribe: domin Fatović parokijan na Varsi of the Crkva sv. Marije.	
		1679–1710	Osor collection XXXVI	Krk (biskupija)	Beli (Cres)	4	21 x 15 cm		Popis desetine Beloa na Cresu (Administrationis ecclesiarum). Latinic with portion from 1679 written in Glagolitic. Binding is fragment of 13th century Glagolitic missal.	
		1679? (March 20)	Spisi Ninske biskupije, kut. 1, br. 10	Arhiv Zadarske nadbiskupije	Nin	1			Visitation of Nin bishop. Italian with Glagolitic translation.	
will		1679 (January 10)	I br. 209	Šibenik (Gradski muzej)	Zlarin				Teštament Vice Juranova deto Grubiše od Zlarina. Scribe: don Ivan Oštarić.	
will		1679 (April 3)	I br. 60	Šibenik (Gradski muzej)	Murter				Taštament Mateše Skračića. Scribe: pop Matij Vodanović.	
will		1679 (April 11)	I br. 196	Šibenik (Gradski muzej)	Tribunj				Taštament Antona Špartere. Scribe: don Ante Belić.	
will		1679 (May 23)	I br. 121	Šibenik (Gradski muzej)	Tisno				Taštament Mate sina pokojnoga Vida Toljića. Scribe: pop Šimun Vučinović.	
will		1679 (August 18)	I br. 200	Šibenik (Gradski muzej)	Prvić				Taštament Antona Bafina. Scribe: fra Šime Ugrinović.	
will		1679 (August 20)	I br. 89	Šibenik (Gradski muzej)	Murter				Taštament Matiěe hćeri Mihe Papešine. Scribe: pop Jadrij Skračić.	
will		1679 (September 6)	I br. 140	Šibenik (Gradski muzej)	Jezera (by Tisno)				Taštament Anice hćeri Marka Zorzina. Scribe: pop Pave Brnić.	
will		1679 (September 27)	I br. 141	Šibenik (Gradski muzej)	Jezera (by Tisno)				Taštament Mate Lukićeva. Scribe: pop Pave Brnić.	
will		1679 (October 25)	I br. 122	Šibenik (Gradski muzej)	Tisno				Taštamenat Mare hćeri pokojnoga Jadrija Despotovića. Scribe: pop Šimun Vučinović.	
will		1679 (November 10)	I br. 142	Šibenik (Gradski muzej)	Jezera (by Tisno)				Taštament Mate sina pokojnoga Grge Petrinova. Scribe: pop Pave Brnić. Photograph of all pages in Šupuk 1957.	
will		1679 (November 10)	I br. 90	Šibenik (Gradski muzej)	Murter				Taštament Kate žene pokojnoga Jive Jelina. Scribe: pop Jadrij Skračić.	
will		1679 (November 12)	I br. 143	Šibenik (Gradski muzej)	Jezera (by Tisno)				Taštamet Ivana Čulina. Scribe: pop Pave Brnić.	
will		1679 (November 19)	I br. 123	Šibenik (Gradski muzej)	Tisno				Taštament meštra Jivana Tolića. Scribe: pop Šimun Vučinović.	
		1679 (November 20-21)	Spisi Ninske biskupije, kut. 1, br. 11/12	Arhiv Zadarske nadbiskupije	Nin, Vir	1			Dacree of bishop of Nin.	
will		1679			Rijeka				Oporuka kancelara Modruške biskupije Ivan Marijašević, kao riječki pučki javni bilježnik. Lost as of Deković 2011.	
christenings		1680–1774	IX 33	Arhiv HAZU	Mali Lošinj	200	42.5 x 15.5 cm		Glagolitic to 12 June 1732 then Italian. In 1732 an explicit prohibition on using lettere Illiriche (Glagolitic) was recorded in it. One photograph in Štefanić 1970.	FS
marriages		1680–1698		Olib (župni arhiv)	Olib	29.2 x 10.2 cm	21 p	1 co	Without cover. Lost as of 2015.	
receipts and expenditures		1680–1705		Monastery of Saint Mary Magdalene in Porat, Krk	Dubašnica, Krk	226	30.5 x 20.3 cm		Blagajnička knjiga primitaka i izdataka.	
will		1680 (February 6)	I br. 124	Šibenik (Gradski muzej)	Tisno				Taštament Filipe hćeri pokojnoga Jakova Vučinovića. Scribe: pop Šimun Vučinović.	
		1680 (March 10-24)	Spisi Ninske biskupije, kut. 1, br. 16/17	Arhiv Zadarske nadbiskupije	Nin, Vrsi, Pojica, Dračevac, Ražanac, Posedarje	2			Decree of bishop of Nin. Italian with Glagolitic translation.	
		1680 (April 8-14)	Spisi Ninske biskupije, kut. 1, br. 13	Arhiv Zadarske nadbiskupije	Nin, Varsi (Vlašići), Poljica, Dračevac, Ražanac, Posedarje	1			Decree of bishop of Nin.	
will		1680 (June 29)	I br. 217	Šibenik (Gradski muzej)	Betina				Taštament Mande Nadrčićev. Scribe: don Pave Magazinov.	
will		1680 (July 2)	I br. 91	Šibenik (Gradski muzej)	Murter				Taštament Dragiše aliti Jive Turčinova. Scribe: pop Jadrij Skračić.	
will		1680 (August 19)	I br. 193	Šibenik (Gradski muzej)	Tribunj				Taštament Marije Bašćanove. Scribe: don Ante Belić.	
will		1680 (September 13)	I br. 218	Šibenik (Gradski muzej)	Jezera (by Tisno)				Taštament Jadre Stipanovića. Scribe: pop Jure Šemić.	
		1680 (September 18)	Spisi Ninske biskupije, kut. 1, br. 15	Arhiv Zadarske nadbiskupije	Ražanac	1			Scribe: don Ive Petković parohijan "Ražana". Glagolitic with Italian translation.	
will		1680 (September 30)	I br. 144	Šibenik (Gradski muzej)	Jezera (by Tisno)				Taštamet Stipana Šemina sina pokojnoga Jadre Šemina. Scribe: pop Pave Brnić.	
will		1680 (October 31)	I br. 194	Šibenik (Gradski muzej)	Tribunj				Taštamenat Jadre Mišičina. Scribe: don Ante Belić.	
will		1680 (December 8)	I br. 219	Šibenik (Gradski muzej)	Rogoznica or Prvić				Taštament Mare hćeri pokojnoga Antona Hercegovića. Scribe: pop Andrija Mihatović.	
will		1680 (December 30)	I br. 145	Šibenik (Gradski muzej)	Jezera (by Tisno)				Taštamet Tomasa sina pokojnoga Jakova Stipanova. Scribe: pop Pave Brnić.	
homiliary		1680	IV a 98	Arhiv HAZU		129	21 x 15 cm		Zbirka propovijedi Ivana Oštarića. Scribe: Ivan Oštarić curate of Zlarin in 1680. A will dated 1661 was attached to the codex, whether written in that year or a copy. Acquired by Kukuljević. One photograph in Štefanić 1970.	
homiliary		1680 (after)	IV a 125 (IV a 143)	Arhiv HAZU		70	20 x 16 cm		Zbirka propovijedi Ivana Oštarića. Scribe: Ivan Oštarić.	
homiliary		1680 (about)	IV a 136	Arhiv HAZU		16	19.3 x 15.3 cm		Zbirčica propovijedi Ivana Oštarića (?). Initial hand Oštarić, f. 10 to end a different hand.	
homiliary		1680 (about)	VII-31	Arhiv HAZU		101	20.5 x 15 cm		Zbirka propovijedi Ivana Oštarića. Scribe: Ivan Oštarić in Zlarin. Once in Betina. Once in the Kvarner region (on Cres or in Labin). Acquired by Arhiv JAZU some time after WWI.	
christenings		1681–1695		Državni arhiv Zadar	Silba		39.2 x 15.7 cm		Glagolitic except for one Italian note.	FS
homiliary		1681–1684	IV a 97	Arhiv HAZU	Ćokovac	149	21 x 14.8 cm		Košćičićeva zbirka propovijedi. Scribe: Bene Košćičić/Košćić of Kukljica, a monk in the Benedictine monastery of sv. Kuzma i Damjan on Pašman (where he was later prior 1687–1703). Inherited by don Šime Koštić who made notes in 1730. Owned 1764 by don Josip Vukušić chaplain in Galovac/Galovci by Zadar. As a student Martin Košćica/Koštica brought it to Zadar where he made a note 1812. Acquired by Kukuljević. One photograph in Štefanić 1970. Bibliography:	
		1681–1739	15	Dobrinj (župni ured)	Dobrinj	100	29 x 21 cm		Knjiga bratovštine Gospe od Loreta. Scribes: Anton Petriš, Petar Petriš, Ivan Volarić, Šimun Gržetić, possibly others f. 3-76.	
		1681–1705		Zagreb (Sv. Ksaver)?	Glavotok				Knjiga dokumenata glavotočkog samostana. Once at Arhiv provincijalata trećoredaca u Zadru. Lost as of 1960.	
will		1681 (April 11)	I br. 210	Šibenik (Gradski muzej)	Zlarin				Taštament Antona Juranova deto Hadumova od Zlarina. Scribe: don Ivan Oštarić.	
will		1681 (April 29)	I br. 146	Šibenik (Gradski muzej)	Jezera (by Tisno)				Taštamet Mateše Bračića. Scribe: pop Pave Brnić.	
will		1681 (May 8)	I br. 211	Šibenik (Gradski muzej)	Zlarin				Taštament Mikule sina pokojnoga Jivana Braniča od Zlarina. Scribe: don Ivan Oštarić.	
will		1681 (June 11)	I br. 195	Šibenik (Gradski muzej)	Tribunj				Taštamenat Šimuna Antuličeva. Scribe: don Ante Belić. Photograph in Šupuk 1957.	
will		1681 (August 1)	I br. 212	Šibenik (Gradski muzej)	Zlarin				Taštament Stipe Pavića od Zlarina. Scribe: don Ivan Oštarić.	
will		1681 (August 5)	I br. 220	Šibenik (Gradski muzej)	Rogoznica or Prvić				Taštament Mate sina pokojnoga Miše Beglina. Scribe: don Andrija Mihatović.	
will		1681 (September 17)	II br. 221	Šibenik (Gradski muzej)	Prvić				Taštament Šimuna Rožina. Scribe: fra Marko Frkić.	
will		1681 (November 13)	I br. 213	Šibenik (Gradski muzej)	Zlarin				Taštament Mate sina pokojnoga Jive Alekse od Zlarina. Scribe: don Ivan Oštarić.	
will		1681 (December 3)	I br. 147	Šibenik (Gradski muzej)	Jezera (by Tisno)				Taštamet Luce žene Ivana Markovinova. Scribe: pop Pave Brnić.	
will		1682 (January 19)	I br. 214	Šibenik (Gradski muzej)	Zlarin				Taštament Jure Škaričina deto Kapulara od Zlarina. Scribe: don Ivan Oštarić.	
		1682 (March 11)	Spisi Ninske biskupije, kut. 1, br. 18	Arhiv Zadarske nadbiskupije	Nin	1			Decree of bishop of Nin.	
will		1682 (March 23)	II br. 222	Šibenik (Gradski muzej)	Prvić				Taštament pokojnoga Jadrija Helmina is Prvića. Scribe: fra Marko Frkić.	
will		1682 (April 4)	I br. 204	Šibenik (Gradski muzej)	Prvić				Taštament Jeline Rokića. Scribe: fra Mati Šantić.	
will		1682 (April 20)	I br. 125	Šibenik (Gradski muzej)	Tisno				Taštament Matije hćeri pokojnoga Filipa Filipova. Scribe: pop Šimun Vučinović.	
will		1682 (August 7)	I br. 148	Šibenik (Gradski muzej)	Jezera (by Tisno)				Taštamet Tomasa Šantića. Scribe: pop Pave Brnić.	
will		1682 (September 17)	I br. 126	Šibenik (Gradski muzej)	Tisno				Taštament Ivanice hćeri pokojnoga Mate Lučičina. Scribe: pop Šimun Vučinović.	
		1682 (September 17)	Spisi Ninske biskupije, kut. 1, br. 19	Arhiv Zadarske nadbiskupije	Nin	1			Decree of bishop of Nin.	
		1682 (October 1)	Spisi Ninske biskupije, kut. 1, br. 20	Arhiv Zadarske nadbiskupije	Nin	1			Scribe: don Jivan Kasić.	
		1682 (October 1)	Spisi Ninske biskupije, kut. 1, br. 21	Arhiv Zadarske nadbiskupije	Vir	1			Scribe: don Marko Mazić parohijan od Vira. Glagolitic with Italian translation.	
		1682 (October 10-11)	Spisi Ninske biskupije, kut. 1, br. 22	Arhiv Zadarske nadbiskupije	Nin, Privlaka	1			Decree of bishop of Nin.	
will		1680 (October 18)	I br. 92	Šibenik (Gradski muzej)	Murter				Taštament Mare žene pokojnoga Mihe Stojanova. Scribe: pop Jadrij Skračić.	
christenings		1683–1825	br. 376	DaZd	Kali	326 p	40.2 x 14.5 cm		Completely Glagolitic even to 1825 except for 2 Latin entries in 1776 and 1778. At the end there is a Latinic transcription of the parish registers of Kali written 1813–1815.	DaZd, FS
matricula		1683–1807, 1857 – after 1949		Arhiv Zadarske nadbiskupije	Kali	140 p	29.6 x 21.5 cm	1 co	Madrikula sv. Trojstva. Glagolitic to 1807 when brotherhood was abolished under Napoleon then Latinic when renewed 1857. One of the last manuscripts with Glagolitic to be in use for records.	GUZ, PB
will		1683 (January)	I br. 215	Šibenik (Gradski muzej)	Zlarin				Taštament Šime sina pokojnoga Ante Lovrića. Scribe: don Ivan Oštarić.	
		1683 (April 4?-13)	Spisi Ninske biskupije, kut. 1, br. 23/24	Arhiv Zadarske nadbiskupije	Nin, Privlaka, Zaton, Vir	2			Decree of bishop of Nin.	
will		1683 (April 17)	II br. 223	Šibenik (Gradski muzej)	Zlosela				Taštamenat Jure Zoričina. Scribe: don Jadre Kapović.	
		1683 (June 18)	Spisi Ninske biskupije, kut. 1, br. 14	Arhiv Zadarske nadbiskupije	Nin	1			Decree. Italian with Glagolitic note "Ovi mandat intiman" cut off.	
ledger		1683–1784, 1784–1912			Sali	296			Knjiga računa crkve sv. Marije. Italian and Latinic with one Glagolitic entry on folio 34.	
christenings		1684–1836	br. 203	DaZd	Dragove	254 p	29.2 x 12 cm		Glagolitic to 1806 inclusive then Latinic.	DaZd, FS
matricula		1684–1793		Arhiv Zadarske nadbiskupije	Olib	71 p	30.1 x 11.1 cm	1 co	Madrikula Bratovštine Gospe od Luzarija i Karmena.	GUZ, PB
ledger		1684–1737	Fragm. glag. 132	Arhiv HAZU		1	29 x 21 cm		List dižmarske knjige vrbničkog klera. 23 entries, written by multiple hands. Discovered by Štefanić among the manuscripts given to him in 1931 by priest Mate Oršić. Given 1958 by Štefanić to JAZU.	
		1684 (January 31)	Spisi Ninske biskupije, kut. 1, br. 25	Arhiv Zadarske nadbiskupije	Nin	1			Letter of bishop of Nin to don Mate Surić. Italian and Glagolitic.	
		1684 (April 23, 26, 30)	Spisi Ninske biskupije, kut. 1, br. 26/27	Arhiv Zadarske nadbiskupije	Nin, Vrsi, Poljica, Dračevac, Ražanac, Posedarje, Novigrad	2			Decree of bishop of Nin.	
		1684 (April 23)	Spisi Ninske biskupije, kut. 1, br. 28/29	Arhiv Zadarske nadbiskupije	Nin	2			Decree of bishop of Nin.	
		1684 (May 15)	Spisi Ninske biskupije, kut. 1, br. 3a	Arhiv Zadarske nadbiskupije	Nin				Decrees of bishop of Nin.	
marriages		1685–1882	br. 205	DaZd	Dragove	160 p	29 x 9.9 cm		Glagolitic to 1805, Latinic from 1808 to end.	DaZd, FS
		1685–1714	inv. br. 3	Baška (župni ured)	Baška	207	30.2 x 20.5 cm		Knjiga kapitulskih prokuratora.	
		1685–1754	11	Dobrinj (župni ured)	Dobrinj	129	31 x 21.5 cm		Kniga bratovštine sv. Trojice. Glagolitic with some Italian.	
christenings		1686–1765, 1805/1806	br. 792	DaZd	Pašman (town)	332 p	29.2 x 10.2 cm	1 co	Includes 1805/1806 confessions and communions.	DaZd, FS
marriages		1686–1854	br. 795	DaZd	Pašman (town)	290 p	29.2 x 10.2 cm		Glagolitic to 1820 then Latinic.	DaZd, FS
deaths		1686–1853	br. 798	DaZd	Pašman (town)	428 p	29.2 x 10 cm		Glagolitic to 1820 then Latinic.	DaZd, FS
		1686–1719	Libro vechio II	Dobrinj (župni ured)	Dobrinj	92	30.5 x 21 cm		Kapitulska knjiga: isprave. Scribes: mostly Ivan Volarić, some Petar Petriš.	
		1686 (April 27)	Spisi Ninske biskupije, kut. 1, br. 30	Arhiv Zadarske nadbiskupije		1			Scribe: don Bene.	
		1686 (September 9)	Spisi Ninske biskupije, kut. 1, br. 31/32	Arhiv Zadarske nadbiskupije	Ražanac	2			Italian with Glagolitic testament. Glagolitic scribe: Mate Ugaraković.	
homiliary		1687	IV a 80/14a	Arhiv HAZU		16	20 x 14.3 cm		Zbirčica propovijedi don Bene Košćice. Scribe: Bene Košćičić. Dialect ikavian. Not to be confused with IV a 138.	
homiliary		1687	IV a 138	Arhiv HAZU		8	19.5 x 14.5 cm		Zbirčica propovijedi don Bene Košćice. Scribe: Bene Košćica. Written for don Jure Rančić parochian of Kukljica.	
souls, eucharist and confession register		1600s-1700s		Arhiv Zadarske nadbiskupije	Biograd na Moru	132 p	29 x 10 cm	2 co	Knjiga Stanje duša i Knjiga onih koji se pričešćuju i ispovidaju. Glagolitic to 1789 then Latinic from 1791.	GUZ, PB
souls		1600s/1700s							Ventarij od duš. Written at the end of the 17th century or the beginning of the 17th century. Lost, but a Latinic transcription was made at the same time as transcriptions from throughout the Nin bishopric.	
homiliary		1600s/1700s	IV a 129	Arhiv HAZU		19	21.4 x 15 cm		Zbirčica propovijedi (iz Košćičića). Written by a single hand. Dialect ikavian. Includes 6 homilies.	
homiliary		1600s/1700s	sign. 292 (old sign. from the Gozza collection)	Dubrovnik (Historijski arhiv)					Dubrovački zbornik propovijedi. Microfilm M 187 at the Staroslavenski institut is of a 1987 facsimile of this manuscript.	
inventory		1600s/1700s		Kostrena (Stipanović family library)	Bakar	1	30 x 21 cm		Glagoljična nabavnica iz Bakra. Seen by or acquired by Darko Deković from captain Igor Stipanović, owner of the Stipanović family library.	IzSt
miscellany?		1600s/1700s	no signature as of 1995	Gorizia (Seminario Teologico)		72	22 x 15.5 cm		Gorizia miscellany (Gorički zbornik). Questions and answers format.	
		1687–1782	br. 22	Vrbnik (župni ured)	Vrbnik	76	30 x 20.5 cm		Knjiga instrumenata bratovštine sv. Antona od Padove.	
deed		1687 (August 23)	Glagolitica II-42	HDA	Krk				Mika Škarbčić prodaje svomu bratu Menku vinograd i dio kuće.	IzSt (2008)
		1688–1706	br. 4	Vrbnik (župni ured)	Vrbnik	10	29 x 20.5 cm		Komad kapitulske knjige legata (zadušina).	
deed		1689 (July 3)	Glagolitica II-43	HDA	Krk				Mika Škarbčić prodaje komad zemlje Peri Škarbčiću.	IzSt (2008)
		1689 (August)	II br. 239	Šibenik (Gradski muzej)	Zadar				Decree of the knez of Zadar to the judge of sv. Fuma at the behest of archdeacon de Dominis regarding Gerga Micić. Scribe: unknown.	
		1689 (October 31)	Spisi Ninske biskupije, kut. 1, br.	Arhiv Zadarske nadbiskupije	Novigrad, Zadar county				Scribe: Miho Vrgošević parish priest of Novigrad (Zadar County).	
deaths		1689.VIII.9-1711.V.22		Prvić Luka parish office	Prvić Luka	32, [40]			Knjiga mrtvih Prvić od 1690 do 1710.	NSK, GHR
		1689 (September)	Spisi Ninske biskupije, kut. 1, br. 33/34	Arhiv Zadarske nadbiskupije	Novigrad, Zadar County	2			Correspondence between the parish priest of Novigrad (by Nin) and the vicar general Pietro Paolo Pacassini (who responded 27 September). Glagolitic and Italian.	
souls		1690–1802		Arhiv Zadarske nadbiskupije	Pakoštane	390 p	33.4 x 15 cm	1 co	Completely Glagolitic. Acquired by Ivan Brčić o Zadar then returned to the župni ured in Pakoštane 9 January 1880 by the Nadbiskupski ordinarijat in Zadar.	GUZ, PB
		1690 (November 15)	Spisi Ninske biskupije, kut. 1, br. 35	Arhiv Zadarske nadbiskupije	Nin	1			Decree of bishop Jure Parkić of Nin. Scribe: Jure Parkić.	
service book		~1690	? 1407	SS. Cyril and Methodius National Library	Croatia	146			Hrvatski glagoljski molitvenik.	NSK, GHR
christenings, confirmations		1691–1774	IX 24	Arhiv HAZU	Omišalj	110	31.3 x 21.3 cm		Christenings 1691–1774 and confirmations 1692–1773.	FS
marriages, deaths		1691–1774	IX 26	Arhiv HAZU	Omišalj	62	30.8 x 21.2 cm		Deaths and marriages 1691–1774.	FS
		1691 (March 20)	Spisi Ninske biskupije, kut. 1, br. 36	Arhiv Zadarske nadbiskupije	Nin, Ražanac, Dračevac, Radovin, Posedarje, Novigrad	1			Decree of Jure Parćić bishop of Nin.	
christenings		1692–1820	inv. br. 1623	Državni arhiv u Zadru	Bokanjac	403 p	30.3 x 10.2 cm		Christenings 1692–1820. Glagolitic to p 182 then Latinic.	DaZd
legal		1692 (November 4)	Glagolitica II-44	HDA	Zadar				Zadarski knez određuje u ime Anzula Fafunića (Fanfogne) glede maslina. Italian translation on reverse.	IzSt (2008)
ledger		1692, 1706–1707	Zbirka glagolitica iz ostavštine Štefana Kocijančića, inv. br. 49	Ljubljana (Narodna i univerzitetska biblioteka)	Dobrinj	6			Odlomci blagajničke knjige kapitula.	
		1692 (January 20, 29)	Spisi Ninske biskupije, kut. 1, br. 37	Arhiv Zadarske nadbiskupije	Nin, Posedarje, Novigrad	1			Decree of Juraj Parćić bishop of Nin. Scribe: bishop Juraj Parčić.	
		1692 (January 20, 22, 26)	Spisi Ninske biskupije, kut. 1, br. 38	Arhiv Zadarske nadbiskupije	Nin, Vrsi, Poljica, Dračevac	1			Decree of bishop Juraj Parčić.	
		1692 (October 18)	Spisi Ninske biskupije, kut. 1, br. 39	Arhiv Zadarske nadbiskupije	Nin, Ražanac, Posedarje, Novigrad.				Decree of bishop Juraj Parčić. Includes Cyrillic confirmations from Podgora and Tribun.	
		1692 (October 18, November 1)	Spisi Ninske biskupije, kut. 1, br. 40	Arhiv Zadarske nadbiskupije	Nin, Vlašići, Poljica				Decree of bishop Juraj Parčić. Scribes: Juraj Parčić, others.	
		1692 (November 17)	Spisi Ninske biskupije, kut. 1, br. 41	Arhiv Zadarske nadbiskupije	Kolan	1			Scribe: don Šime Žuberica paroch of Kolan.	
confessions and communions		1692	Spisi Ninske biskupije, kut. 1, br. 42	Arhiv Zadarske nadbiskupije	Zaton	1			Glagolitic with Italian translation.	
		1600s-1700s	sign. VII 161	Arhiv HAZU	Draga Bašćanska	203	10 x 7.5 cm		Molitvenik Bare Tomašića. Likely begun in 1692. There was a priest Bare Tomašić in Draga Bašćanska mentioned 1749 and 1782–1805. Acquired by JAZU in 1959 with Gršković library.	
marriages		1693–1719	br. 674	DaZd	Novigrad, Zadar County	64 p	29.5 x 10.5 cm		Glagolitic only for 1704, 1716–1718 (pp. 33, 53-59, 63, 64).	DaZd, FS
christenings		1693–1813	br. 131	DaZd	Brbinj	286 p	29.5 x 10 cm			DaZd, FS
		1693 (February 8, March 1)	Spisi Ninske biskupije, kut. 1, br. 43	Arhiv Zadarske nadbiskupije	Nin, Novigrad	1			Decree of bishop Juraj Parčić.	
		1693 (February 8)	Spisi Ninske biskupije, kut. 1, br. 44	Arhiv Zadarske nadbiskupije	Nin, Posedarje	1			Decree of bishop Juraj Parčić.	
		1693 (February 8, March 5, 12)	Spisi Ninske biskupije, kut. 1, br. 45	Arhiv Zadarske nadbiskupije	Nin, Vlašići, Poljica, Dračevac	1			Decree of bishop Juraj Parčić.	
		1693 (April)	Spisi Ninske biskupije, kut. 1, br. 46	Arhiv Zadarske nadbiskupije	Turanj	1			Scribe: don Ive Milinović paroch of Turanj.	
		1693 (November 28)	Spisi Ninske biskupije, kut. 1, br. 47	Arhiv Zadarske nadbiskupije	Nin	1			Decree of bishop Juraj Parčić.	
christenings		1694–1839	br. 1356	DaZd	Turanj	328 p	25 x 10.5 cm		Mostly Glagolitic even to 1839, with duplicates 1825–1839. Latinic used sporadically (1772, 1822, 1830, 1836, 1839). A rare example of a parish book using predominantly Glagolitic past 1825.	DaZd, FS
marriages		1694–1839	br. 1361	DaZd	Turanj	194 p	28.5 x 10.2 cm	1 co	Mostly Glagolitic even to 1839, with duplicates 1825–1839. Latinic used sporadically (1781, 1782, 1783, 1839).	DaZd, FS
christenings		1694–1719	br. 668	DaZd	Novigrad, Zadar County	166 p	29.1 x 10.5 cm	1 co	Latinic but with Glagolitic for 1702 (p. 47), 1704 (p. 60), 1706–1707 (pp. 73, 74, 80), 1708–1709 (pp. 88, 90), 1716–1718 (pp. 136–142, 144, 147-153).	DaZd, FS
		1694 (March 8)	Spisi Ninske biskupije, kut. 1, br. 48	Arhiv Zadarske nadbiskupije	Nin	1			Decree of bishop Juraj Parčić.	
		1694 (May 2, April 23)	Spisi Ninske biskupije, kut. 1, br. 1a	Arhiv Zadarske nadbiskupije	Nin, Ražanac, Poličnik				Decree of bishop Juraj Parčić.	
		1694 (August 31)	Spisi Ninske biskupije, kut. 1, br. 49/50	Arhiv Zadarske nadbiskupije	2				Decree of bishop Juraj Parčić. Italian with Glagolitic translation.	
marriages		1695–1830	br. 1026	DaZd	Sali	136 p	37.5 x 13 cm		Glagolitic to 1824 then Latinic.	DaZd, FS
souls		1695–1825, 1844		Arhiv Zadarske nadbiskupije	Sali	268 p	37.5 x 13 cm	2 co	Glagolitic pages 1–74 then Latinic.	GUZ, PB
matricula		1695–1858		Arhiv Zadarske nadbiskupije	Dragove	200 p	32 x 10.9 cm	1 co	Madrikula Gospe Dubovice. Glagolitic to 1803 then Latinic.	GUZ, PB
		1695 (March 2)	Spisi Ninske biskupije, kut. 1, br. 51	Arhiv Zadarske nadbiskupije	Nin, Poličnik, Ražanac	1			Decree of bishop Juraj Parčić.	
		1695 (March 10)	Spisi Ninske biskupije, kut. 1, br. 52	Arhiv Zadarske nadbiskupije		1			Italian document with Glagolitic confirmation by pop Mikula Grandić, a parish priest.	
		1695 (April 8)	II br. 224	Šibenik (Gradski muzej)	Betina				Ugovor o diobi izmežu Šime Jakovčeva i sinovaca. Scribe: don Jadre Kapović.	
		1695 (July 6, 11)	Spisi Ninske biskupije, kut. 1, br. 53	Arhiv Zadarske nadbiskupije	Nin, Vlašići, Poljica, Dračevac	1			Decree of bishop Juraj Parčić.	
		1695 (December 15)	Spisi Ninske biskupije, kut. 1, br. 54	Arhiv Zadarske nadbiskupije	Kali	1			Scribe: don Mate Longinov parish priest of Kali. Glagolitic with Italian translation.	
christenings		1696–1712	br. 1045	DaZd	Silba	70 p				DaZd
marriages		1696–1712		Arhiv Zadarske nadbiskupije	Silba	214+32 p	39 x 15.5 cm	1 co	Glagolitic and Latinic.	larger: PB, smaller: PB, GUZ; FS
deaths		1696–1839	br. 1364	DaZd	Turanj	216 p	28.5 x 10.5 cm	1 co	Mainly Glagolitic, with sporadic Latinic (1829, 1836, 1839) and duplicates 1825–1839. A rare example of a parish book using predominantly Glagolitic past 1825.	DaZd, FS
deaths		1696–1830	br. 1028	DaZd	Sali	186 p	42.5 x 15.5 cm		Glagolitic to 1825 then Latinic.	DaZd, FS
deaths		1696–1712		Arhiv Zadarske nadbiskupije	Silba	214 p	40 x 15 cm	1 co		GUZ
		1696–1787	br. 23	Vrbnik (župni ured)	Vrbnik	70	32.5 x 22 cm		Knjiga bratovšt sv. Antona od Padove.	
letters		1696–1698	HR–DAZD–359 (Obitelj Lantana collection) kut. 1 sign. 21	DaZd		12			Correspondence between Orazio Lantana and Gerolamo Tiepolo. Latinic with some Glagolitic. Part of Lantana family archive. Acquired by Državni arhiv u Zadru 1945.	
		1696 (January 15)	Spisi Ninske biskupije, kut. 1, br. 55	Arhiv Zadarske nadbiskupije	Nin	1			Decree of bishop Juraj Parčić.	
		1696 (January 15)	Spisi Ninske biskupije, kut. 1, br. 56	Arhiv Zadarske nadbiskupije	Nin, Vlašići, Poljica, Dračevac	1			Decree of bishop Juraj Parčić.	
		1696 (March 19, April 15)	Spisi Ninske biskupije, kut. 1, br. 57	Arhiv Zadarske nadbiskupije	Nin, Zaton, Privlaka, Vir	1			Decree of bishop Juraj Parčić.	
		1696 (March 27, July 24)	Spisi Ninske biskupije, kut. 1, br. 61	Arhiv Zadarske nadbiskupije	Zadar, Ražanac				Translation of decree of Daniel Dolfin. May have been translated much later than the decree. Confirmed in Ražanac 24 July.	
		1696 (March 30)	Spisi Ninske biskupije, kut. 1, br. 58/59	Arhiv Zadarske nadbiskupije	Zadar, Ražanac	2			Decree of Daniel Dolfin, providur general of Dalmatia and Albania. Italian with Glagolitic translation.	
		1696 (June 29)	Spisi Ninske biskupije, kut. 1, br. 60	Arhiv Zadarske nadbiskupije	Nin	1			Decree of bishop Juraj Parčić.	
matricula		1697–1812, 1844, 1846, 1867, 1850–1890		Arhiv Zadarske nadbiskupije	Premuda	68 p	42.5 x 15.4 cm	1 co	Madrikula sv. Kirijaka. Glagolitic to 1812 then Latinic. Some notes from 1765 and 1772 also Latinic.	GUZ, PB
ledger		1697–1783, 1791	VIII 163	Arhiv HAZU	Vlašići (Pag)	76	30.3 x 21 cm		Knjiga računa bratovštine sv. Sakramenta (sv. Jerolima) u Vlašićima. Glagolitic to 1771 then Latinic. Acquired by JAZU with Premuda library 1948.	
ledger		1697 (July)	Spisi Ninske biskupije, kut. 1, br. 63	Arhiv Zadarske nadbiskupije					Miseca luja desetina od žita.	
		1697 (October 31)	Spisi Ninske biskupije, kut. 1, br. 62	Arhiv Zadarske nadbiskupije	Nin	1			Decree of bishop Juraj Parčić. Italian and Glagolitic.	
christenings		1698–1712		Državni arhiv Zadar	Silba	66 p	39 x 14.2 cm	1 co	Glagolitic with some Latinic and 2 Italian entries.	FS
confirmations		1698–1825		Arhiv HAZU	Turanj	180 p	28.5 x 10.5 cm	1 co	All Glagolitic except page 36 (1825). Lost as of 2015.	
confirmations		1698–1825		Arhiv Zadarske nadbiskupije	Sali	148 p	43.2 x 15.8 cm		Glagolitic until the visit of archbishop Novak in 1825, then Latinic.	GUZ, PB
confirmations		1698–1793		Dragove (župni ured)	Dragove	48 p	28.9 x 9.9 cm		Glagolitic except page 19 in Latinic. Lost as of 2015.	
confirmations, marriages		1698–1782	VIII 237	Arhiv HAZU	Dinjiška/Vlašići (Pag)	38	30 x 10.5 cm		Confirmations 1698–1782 and marriages 1731–1734. Glagolitic to 11v then Italian and Latin. Last Glagolitic entry in 1777. In 1948 it was acquired by the Arhiv JAZU in Zagreb with the ostavština of Vinko Premuda.	FS
souls		1698–1806		Arhiv Zadarske nadbiskupije	Silba	64 p	28.5 x 20.5 cm	1 co	Glagolitic to page 35 then Latinic.	GUZ, PB
deaths		1698–1755	br. 382	DaZd	Kali	30 x 9.9 cm	104 p			DaZd FS
legal		1698 (August 1)	Glagolitica II-45	HDA	Zadar				Zadarski knez nalaže sucima Dobre Poljane da urede pitanje pudarije (čuvanja) vinograda. Italian translation on reverse.	IzSt (2008)
		1698 (February 26)	Spisi Ninske biskupije, kut. 1, br. 65	Arhiv Zadarske nadbiskupije	Nin, Zaton, Privlaka	1			Decree of bishop Juraj Parčić.	
		1698 (February 26)	Spisi Ninske biskupije, kut. 1, br. 66	Arhiv Zadarske nadbiskupije	Nin, Nadin	1			Decree of bishop Juraj Parčić.	
		1698 (February 26)	Spisi Ninske biskupije, kut. 1, br. 67	Arhiv Zadarske nadbiskupije	Nin	1			Decree of bishop Juraj Parčić.	
		1698 (February 26)	Spisi Ninske biskupije, kut. 1, br. 68	Arhiv Zadarske nadbiskupije	Nin, Posedarje, Islam Latinski	1			Decree of bishop Juraj Parčić.	
		1698 (May 1)	Spisi Ninske biskupije, kut. 1, br. 69	Arhiv Zadarske nadbiskupije	Nin	1			Decree of bishop Juraj Parčić, in Glagolitic and Italian.	
		1698 (June 16, 20, 22, 30)	Spisi Ninske biskupije, kut. 1, br. 70	Arhiv Zadarske nadbiskupije	Nin, Vlašići, Poljica, Dračevac	1			Decree of bishop Juraj Parčić.	
		1698 (June 16, 22)	Spisi Ninske biskupije, kut. 1, br. 71	Arhiv Zadarske nadbiskupije	Nin, Zaton, Vir, Privlaka	1			Decree of bishop Juraj.	
		1698 (June 22, July 2, 6)	Spisi Ninske biskupije, kut. 1, br. 72/73	Arhiv Zadarske nadbiskupije	Nin, Zaton, Privlaka, Vir	2			Decree of Petar Korner knez ninski in Glagolitic translation.	
		1698 (July 4)	Spisi Ninske biskupije, kut. 1, br.74	Arhiv Zadarske nadbiskupije	Nin	1			Decree of Petar Korner knez ninski. Glagolitic and Italian versions.	
		1698 (July 4)	Spisi Ninske biskupije, kut. 1, br. 75	Arhiv Zadarske nadbiskupije	Nin	1			Scribes: don Mate Surić, others.	
		1698 (October 17)	Spisi Ninske biskupije, kut. 1, br. 76	Arhiv Zadarske nadbiskupije	Novigrad				Decree of bishop Juraj Parčić.	
		1698 (October 20)	Spisi Ninske biskupije, kut. 1, br. 77	Arhiv Zadarske nadbiskupije	Nin	1			Decree of bishop Juraj Parčić. Glagolitic with Latin translation.	
christenings		1699–1858	br. 1551	DaZd	Zapuntel	153 p	29.4 x 10 cm		Christenings 1699–1836 and 1825–1845, marriages 1826–1858, deaths 1826–1851. Glagolitic to 1806 then Latinic.	DaZd, FS
deaths		1699–1813	br. 1335	DaZd	Tkon	220 p	31 x 10 cm	1 co	Glagolitic except 1811–1813.	DaZd, FS
		1699–1821		Arhiv Zadarske nadbiskupije	Sutomišćica	46 p	30 x 11 cm		Popis sudaca, gaštalda, prokuratura raznih bratovština župe Sutomišćica. Glagolitic except for several Latinic names on page 26.	
matricula		1669–1782		Arhiv Zadarske nadbiskupije	Banj	78 p	38.2 x 23 cm	1 co	Matricula of the Holy Body (Madrikula svetog Tila).	GUZ, PB
ledger		1699–1735	Libro Nro III	Dobrinj (župni ured)	Dobrinj	197	31 x 21.5 cm		Kapitulska knjiga: računi.	
		1699 (May 1)	Spisi Ninske biskupije, kut. 1, br. 80/81	Arhiv Zadarske nadbiskupije	Split				Decree of Alviš Mocenig, providur general of the Venetian Republic for Dalmatia and Albania. Glagolitic scribe: secretary Ivan Petar Kavali.	
		1699 (August 29)	Spisi Ninske biskupije, kut. 1, br. 82	Arhiv Zadarske nadbiskupije	Nin				Decree of Juraj Parčić. Glagolitic with Italian translation.	
		1699 (September 9)	Spisi Ninske biskupije, kut. 1, br. 83	Arhiv Zadarske nadbiskupije	Nin				Decree of Juraj Parčić. Glagolitic with Italian translation.	
		1699 (September 13, 23)	Spisi Ninske biskupije, kut. 1, br. 84/85	Arhiv Zadarske nadbiskupije	Zadar				Decree of Michael Vizzamano count of Zadar. Glagolitic scribe: Paval Rosana "kancilir pod posluh".	
letter		1699 (December 21)	Spisi Ninske biskupije, kut. 1, br. 86	Arhiv Zadarske nadbiskupije	Bokanjac	1			Letter of don Šime of Bokanjac.	
demarcation		1600s	Acta Collegii Jesuitarum Fluminensis, Fasc. 11, br. 1	HDA	Divin?				Kožljac demarcation (Kožljački razvod). Original from 1395 survives. Once kept in Budapest in the Hungarian National Archive as M.O.D.L. 35819. Parchment.	
homiliary		1600s	Sign. MS 11	Košljun	Košljun	210	20.5 x 14.9 cm		Zbirka propovijedi za korizmu i advenat.	
homily		1600s	Sign. MS 11a	Košljun	Košljun	18	21 x 15 cm		Propovijed na navještenje. Possibly same scribe as Košljun Sign. MS 11.	
		1600s	1 D c 1/27 (1 D c 2/7)	Prague (National Museum)	Cres (island)	2	13.5 x 9.4 cm		Zlomek hlaholského direktáře františkánského řádu z ostrova Čresu. Discovered by 1957 by the cyr. rkp. of the KNM.	
		1600s	IV a 80/57	Arhiv HAZU	Iž (island)	1	9.2 x 14.2 cm		Amulet Petra Marelića. Scribe: Petar Marelić (who wrote a marriage confirmation 1659 and was the scribe of registers 1617–1664 in Rava and in Veli Iž). Acquired from Iž in 1846 by possibly Berčić judging by the handwriting of a note.	
chronicle	ChAnd	1600s	Borgiano illirico 1 + 2	Vatican Library		108 + 232			Ljetopis crkveni Andrije Zmajevića (Ecclesiastical chronicle of Andrija Zmajević).	
		1600s	Osor collection IX	Krk	Osor	~350			Miscellanea. Latinic with 24 Glagolitic testimonies in the 3rd binding.	
Dialogues of Gregory	DiFan	1600s	Glagolitica I-14	Croatian State Archives	Croatia	111	12.5 x 17.5 cm		Dialogues of Gregory (Dijalog Grgura pape Fanfonjin). The Glagolitic "Dialogues of Gregory" are not to be confused with the true Dialogues of Gregory. It actually contains treatises of Christian dogma and morals. The characters are not Gregorius and Petrus, but Teacher and Master. Once in Vrbnik. Purchased 1911 by State Archives from Fanfogna family in Trogir. Microforms were made April 1985 for the Star. inst. (M 222/17n, 222/18a). Bibliography:	IzSt (2008)
prayer book		1600s	Glagolitica I-17	Croatian State Archives	Croatia	13	10 x 14 cm		Fragmenti molitvenika iz 17 st. Donated to HDA by Branko Kursar in 1962.	IzSt (2008)
miscellany	CVat	1600s	Borgiano illirico 23	Vatican Library		222			Vatikanski zbornik Illirico 23 (Vatican miscellany Illirico 23). 3 parts: I, II, III.	
legal		1600s	Glagolitica II-1b	HDA	Jablanac				Pop Luka Mikulanić iz Javlanca obećava platiti dug Kaptolu senjskom. 17th century copy of original dated 11 April 1485.	IzSt (2008)
legal		1600s		Ljubljana (biblioteka franjevačke provincije Sv. Križa)	Trsat (Franciscan Monastery)				Privilegij kojim knezovi, vojvoda i suci hrvatskih Vlaha uzimaju pod svoju zaštitu crkvu Sv. Ivana na području Gore u Lici. Transcription made in 17th century in Franciscan monastery in Trsat. Original dates to 19 July 1433	
will		1600s		Trsat (franjevačka kloštra)	Lovran				Will of Lovran Parish Priest Raden (Oporuka lovranskog plovana Radena). Original dated 9 May 1420. Only copy survives. Mistakenly dated by Šurmin to 1410.	
		1600s (second half)	IV a 78	Arhiv HAZU		16	20.3 x 14.9 cm		Odlomak kvarezimala. Part of the Košljun kvarezimal. Identical hand.	
		1600s (second half)	IV a 80/35	Arhiv HAZU		7	14.5 x 10 cm		Košćičićevi odlomci lucidara. Scribe: Bene Košćičić.	
		1600s (second half)	IV a 74 (IV a 63)	Arhiv HAZU	North Dalmatia	62	20.4 x 14.6 cm		Knjige od života i dili slatkoga Isusa. Discovered 1855 in Kukljica on Ugljan by Berčić. One photograph in Štefanić 1970. Bibliography:	
		1600s (second half)	III a 18	Arhiv HAZU	Krk (island)	76	18 x 13 cm		Priručnik moralne teologije. Copy of a Franciscan translation from Italian on Krk. In hands of priest Nenadić by early years of 18th century.	
breviary		1600s (second half) / 1700s		Grohote (župni arhiv)		113			Šoltanski brevijar Časi nasuštьnihь (Svagdanji časovi). Includes Cyrillic and Latinic notes. Microfilms in Zagreb made 1984. Bibliography:	IzSt (2008)
		1600s-1700s	HR–DAZD–359 (Obitelj Lantana collection) kut. 2 sign. 38	DaZd		58			Anagrafski podatci i službena korespondencija između generalnih providura i Simeona Lantane i drugih oficira T. s. Part of Lantana family archive. Latinic with 2 Glagolitic folia (ff. 31, 32). Acquired by Državni arhiv u Zadru 1945.	
miscellany		1600s/1700s	IV a 141 (IV a 153)	Arhiv HAZU		53	19.4 x 14 cm		Bilanovićev zbornik. Latinic to f. 27v then Glagolitic. Scribes: Latinic by Miho Bilanović in Zadar around 1661, hand A f. 29-37, 38v-39, 51-48v (upside down pages), hand B f. 48-46, hand C f. 45-42v, 41-40. Glagolitic parts likely written after 1661, with hand A probably still in the 17th century but hands B and C in the 18th century. To the 18th century also belong some later notes by students in the Benedictine monastery sv. Kuzme i Damjana in Tkon (by Ive "Huhiha", a childish farce by the scribe). Manuscript once in Zemunik. Ćulina Pere Meštrić). Bibliography:	
prayer book		1600s/1700s	III a 1 (Kuk. 502)	Arhiv HAZU	Vrbnik?, Draga Bašćanska?, Porat	113	11.2 x 8.3 cm		Prayer book of brother Ivan Čeperić (Molitvenik fra Ivana Čeperića). Scribes: 3 anonymous hands (A f. 9v-11 youngest; B f. 20-25v, 67-74b, 83-88, 99-100 similar to A; C f. 26-65 oldest) in Glagolitic and Latinic by Ivan Čeperić f. 1-3. Hand C wrote in Vrbnik dialect. Hands A and B probably from Draga Bašćanska. Includes notes on f. 113v and the back cover as well as 2 loose leaves of paper. Ivan Čeperić was born in Draga Bašćanska and became a Franciscan 1739 in Dubašnica (Porta). One of the free leaves mentioned fra Gašpar of Glavotok (possibly Gašpar Milčetić guardian of Dubašnica mentioned 1683 and 1705). Acquired by Kukuljević from Josip Benedikt Turlić of Dubašnica who found it there.	
prayer book		1600s/1700s	IV a 80/50	Arhiv HAZU		2	18.5 x 13.8 cm		Odlomci molitava. Written in štokavskoikavski. Written by an educated scribe, possibly Jesuit.	
homiliary		1600s/1700s	IV a 67 (IV a 78)	Arhiv HAZU	North Dalmatia	65	19.8 x 14.8 cm		Zbirka propovijedi i slične građe. Hand similar to that of Ivan Oštarić but with notable differences. One photograph in Štefanić 1970.	
homiliary		1600s/1700s	IV a 139	Arhiv HAZU	North Dalmatia	14	20.2 x 14.2 cm		Zbirčica propovijedi.	
homily		1600s/1700s	IV a 80/45	Arhiv HAZU		2	19.8 x 14.5 cm		Propovijed na Duhove.	
miscellany	CSab	1600s/1700s	n/a	n/a					Sabljićev zbornik (Sabljić miscellany). By a certain Sabljić. It was located in the archive of the Franciscan monastery of the third order in Zadar, and then taken to the archive of the Franciscan monastery of the third order of Saint Francis Xavier in Zagreb, but it has not been seen since then as of 2003.	
handbook		1600s/1700s	R 3376 (old SM 32 F 28)	NSK	Dubašnica	13 + 48	20.3 x 14.7 cm		Govorenje o svetoj misi i sakramentima. Theological manual.	NSK
ledger		1600s/1700s	Glagolitica II-46	HDA	Baška				Računi nekog popa.	IzSt (2008)
