= Kožino =

Village in Croatia

- Location within Croatia
- Coordinates: 44°10′N 15°12′E
- Country: Croatia
- County: Zadar
- City: Zadar

Area
  - Total: 5.8 km^{2} (2.2 sq mi)

Population (2021)
  - Total: 800
  - Density: 140/km^{2} (360/sq mi)
- Time zone: UTC+1 (CET)
  - Summer (DST): UTC+2 (CEST)

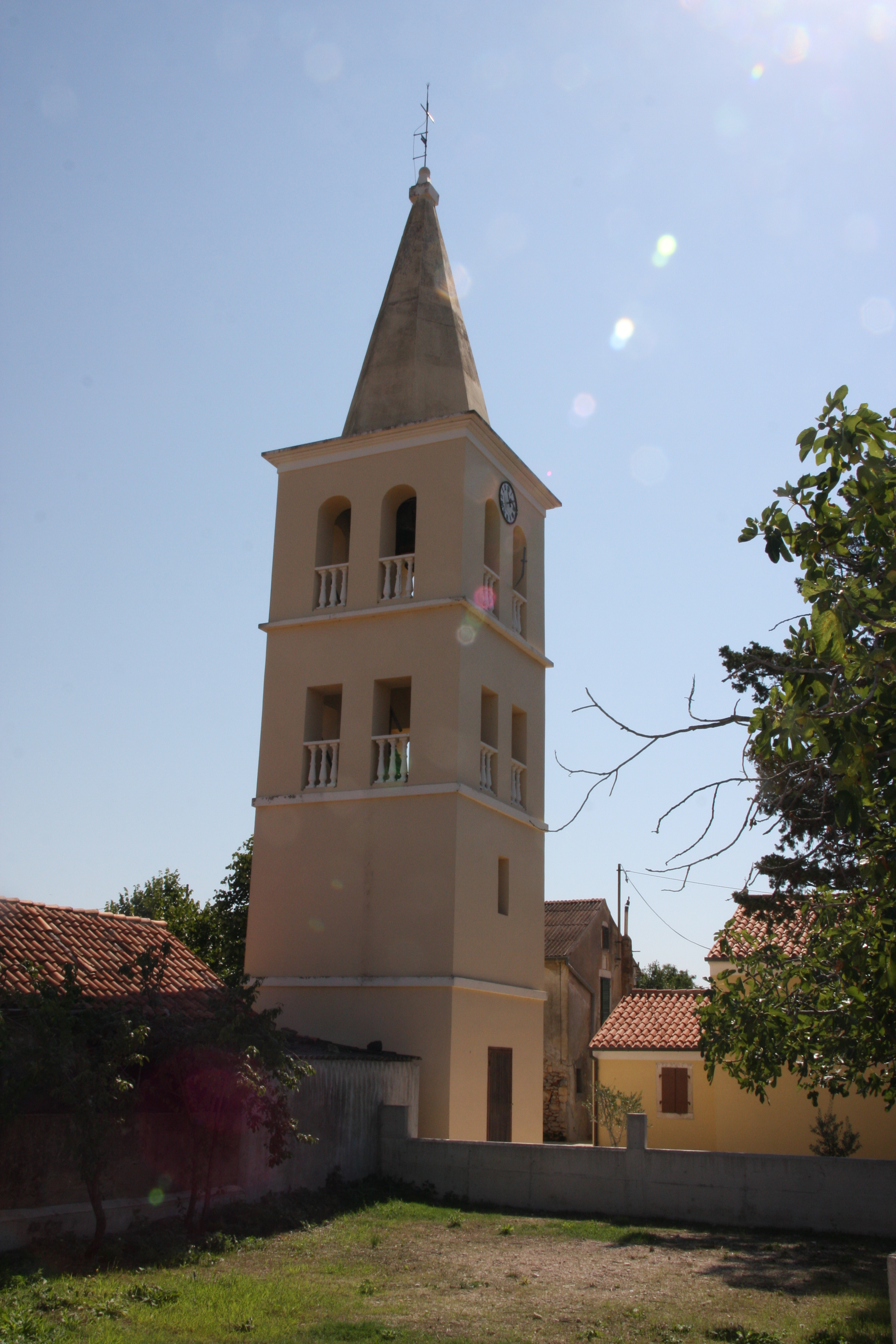
Church of Saint Michael in Kožino

Kožino is a village located 9 km northwest of Zadar, in northern Dalmatia, Croatia, with population of 815 (2011 census).

The church of St. Michael the Archangel was built in 1522.
