= List of Croatian inventions and discoveries =

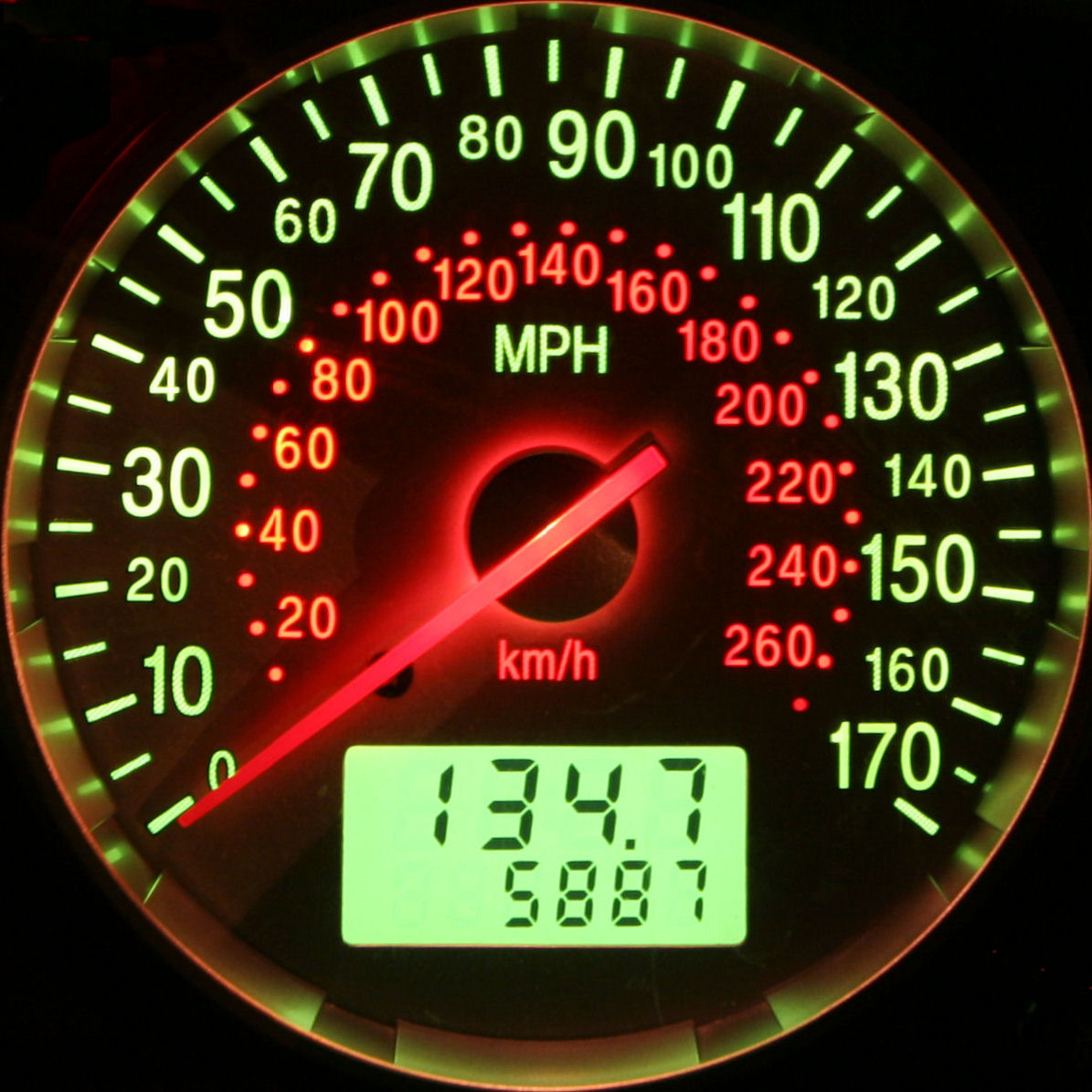
Speedometer

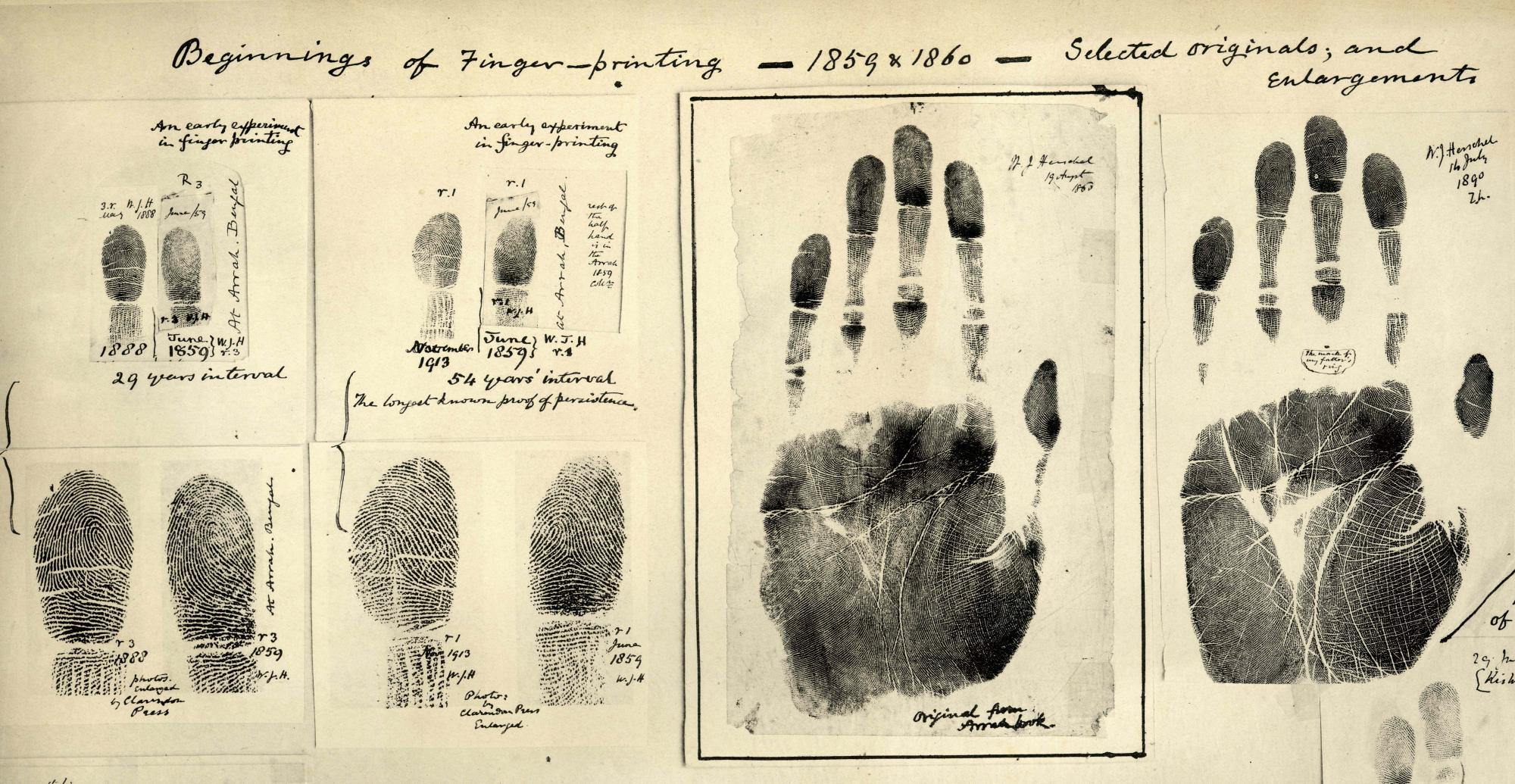
Fingerprints are used in dactyloscopy

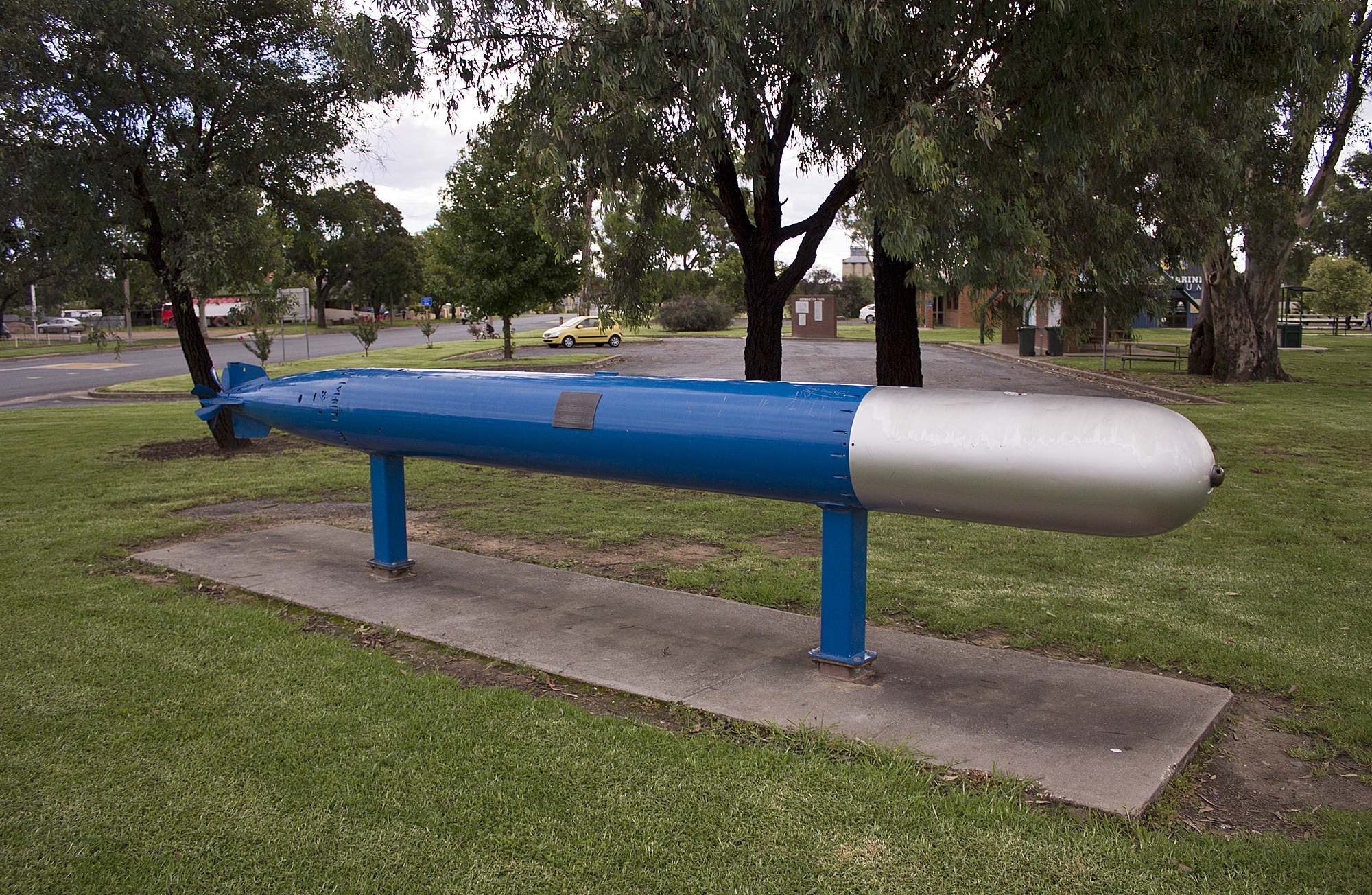
Torpedo

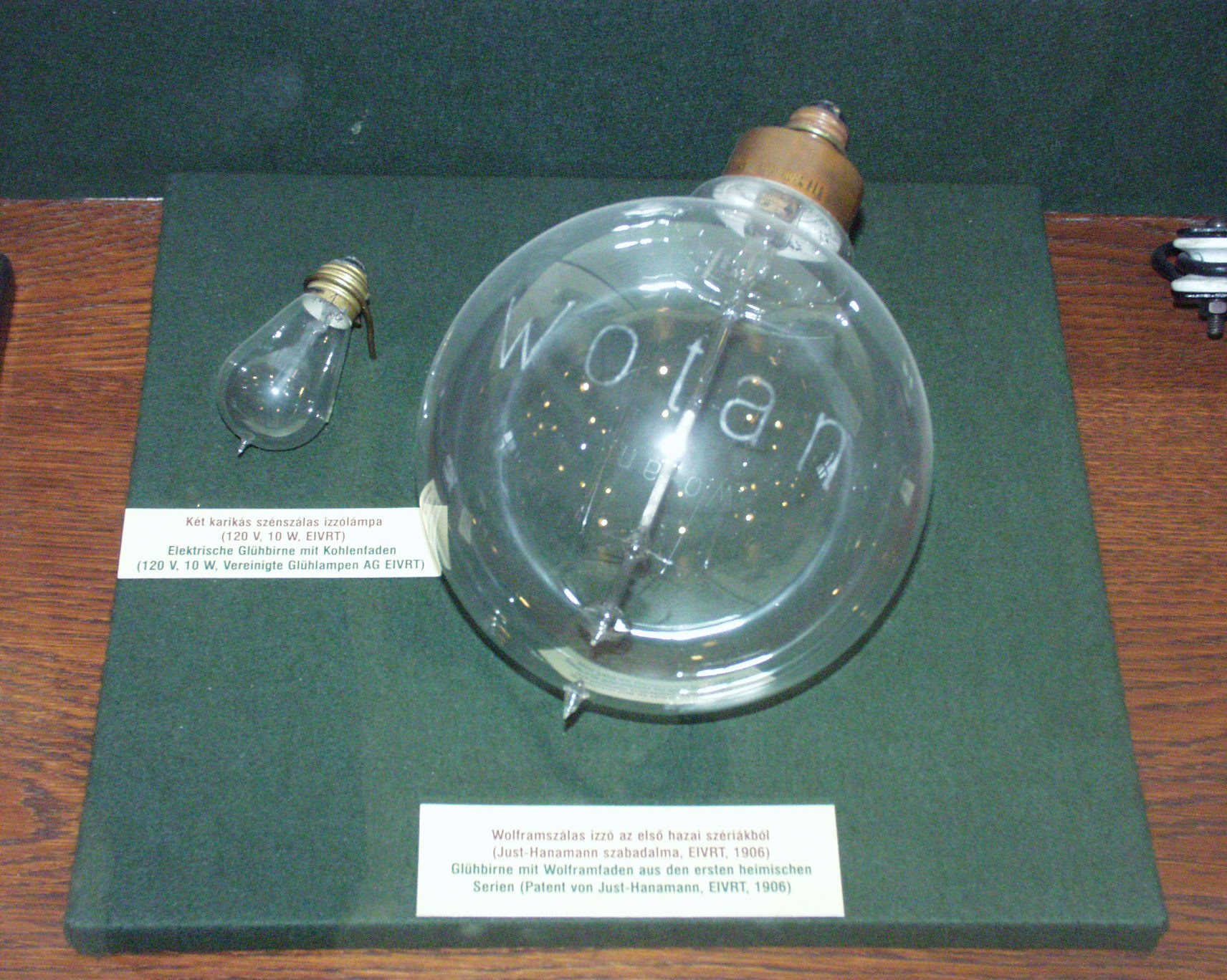
Tungsten filament for electric light bulbs

Croatian inventions and discoveries are objects, processes or techniques invented or discovered, by people from Croatia.

Invention/discovery	Inventor/discoverer	Notes
Pay-by-phone parking	Group of computer scientists	
Electric speedometer	Josip Belušić	
Boscovich atomic theory; Absence of atmosphere on the moon; Least absolute deviations; Vitrometer	Ruđer Bošković	
Genomic phylostratigraphy	Tomislav Domazet-Lošo	
Ethanol-chlorobenzene dosimetry	Igor Dvornik	
Azithromycin	Slobodan Đokić, Gorjana Radoboja-Lazarevski, Zrinka Tamburašev, Gabrijela Kobrehel	
Stars and bars; Feller process; Feller's coin-tossing constants; Feller-continuous process	William Feller	
First tungsten filament for electric light bulbs	Franjo Hanaman & Aleksandar Just	
Janko group	Zvonimir Janko	
Low temperature difference (ΔT) Stirling engine	Ivo Kolin	
Duplex connection of telegraphic transmission	Ferdinand Kovačević	
Tincture of iodine	Antonio Grossich	
Liscic/NANMAC probe; Ispen-Liscic sensor	Božidar Liščić	
Hydraulic rotary oil well drilling; Christmas tree oil well; Spindletop oil field	Anthony Francis Lucas	Working near Beaumont, Texas, Lucas struck oil on January 10, 1901, the largest gusher ever at that time. The discovery of oil at Spindletop led to widespread oil exploration and economic development in the state, later becoming known as the Texas oil boom.
Sloan Great Wall	Mario Jurić (co-discoverer)	
First self-propelled torpedo	Giovanni Luppis	Luppis came upon the unfinished plans of an unknown Austrian Marine Artillery officer for a small self-propelled boat loaded with explosives that could be deployed against enemy ships and steered from land. Luppis developed a prototype but was unsatisfied, but approached British engineer Robert Whitehead with the idea. Whitehead developed the concept into a successful self-steered explosive device which would strike below the waterline. Though the device was heavily modified from Luppis' concept and became known as the Whitehead torpedo, Whitehead credited Luppis as its inventor.
Mohorovičić discontinuity	Andrija Mohorovičić	
Positronium	Stjepan Mohorovičić	
Imerslund–Najman–Gräsbeck syndrome	Emil Najman	
Prelog strain; Conformational analysis; Synthesis of Adamantane; Klyne-Prelog system	Vladimir Prelog	
Puretic power block	Mario Puratić	
SOS response	Miroslav Radman	
Randić's molecular connectivity index	Milan Randić	
Synthesis of testosterone and androsterone; Synthesis of macrocyclic ketones; Ruzicka large-ring synthesis; Synthesis and elucidation of various terpenes; Muscone	Leopold Ružička	
Laminate flooring; Glueless laminate flooring; Click for joining wood, laminate and plastic floor covering	Darko Pervan	
High-speed photography	Peter Salcher	
Wireless non-radiative energy transfer	Marin Soljačić	
Truss bridge; Vertical axis wind turbine; Aerial tramway; Tied-arch bridge; Through arch bridge	Fausto Veranzio	
Computer-Associative Analyzer	Branko Souček	
Forensic fingerprinting	Juan Vucetich	Created the first method of recording the fingerprints of individuals on file, associating these fingerprints to the anthropometric system of Alphonse Bertillon, who had created, in 1879, a system to identify individuals by anthropometric photographs and associated quantitative descriptions. In 1892, after studying Galton's pattern types, Vucetich set up the world's first fingerprint bureau.
Feebly compact space	Sibe Mardesic	
Bilinski dodecahedron	Stanko Bilinski	
Mannitol; Hexene	Julije Domac	
Chemical graph theory	Milan Randic	
Sea Organ	Nikola Bašić	
Krapina Neanderthal Site largest Neanderthal collection in the world	Dragutin Gorjanović-Kramberger	
Traitorous eight/Silicon Valley	Victor Grinich	
Author of the term psychology	Marko Marulić	
Modern conventional hot water bottle (thermaphore); A type of bluing detergent; A rail-car brake; An anode battery; A solid-ink fountain pens	Slavoljub Penkala	
Bracera; Cravat; Modern tamburica; Licitar		
