= Wave Organ =

Sculpture in San Francisco, California, U.S.

Coordinates: 37°48′31″N 122°26′25″W

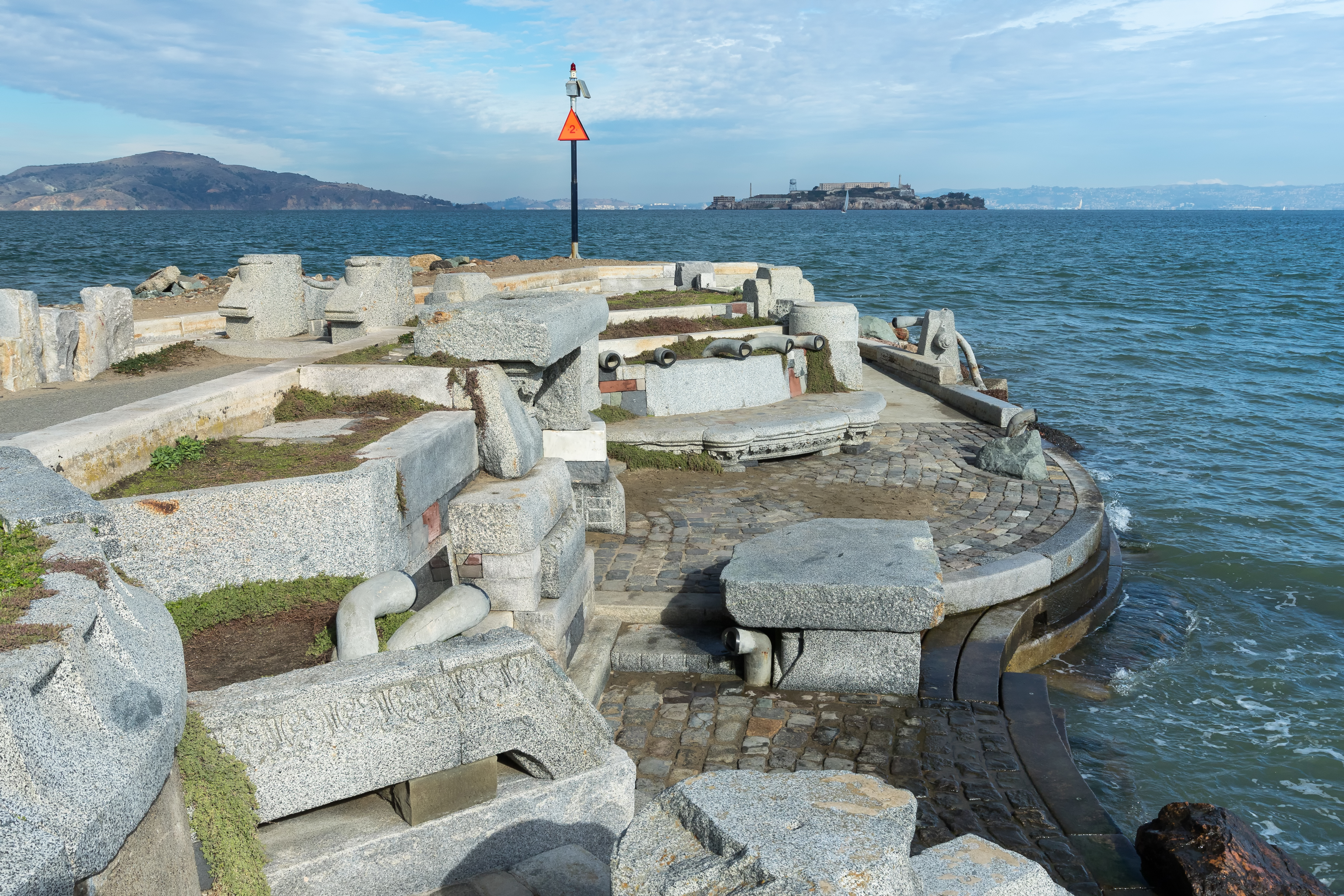
The Wave Organ

Audio recording of the Wave Organ in September 2011

The Wave Organ is a sculpture located in San Francisco, California. It was constructed on the shore of San Francisco Bay in May 1986 by the Exploratorium, and more specifically, by installation artist and the Exploratorium artist-in-residence Peter Richards, who conceived and designed the organ, working with stonemason George Gonzales.

The Wave Organ is dedicated to Frank Oppenheimer. Oppenheimer was the founding director of the Exploratorium, led the fundraising efforts for the Wave Organ, and died seven months before construction started.

== Location ==
The Wave Organ is located at the end of a spit of land extending from the Golden Gate Yacht Club. There is a panoramic view of the city across the narrow channel into the St. Francis and Golden Gate yacht clubs, bounded on the left by the Fort Mason piers and to the right by a towering eucalyptus grove bordering Crissy Field. The park and trail to it are wheelchair accessible, with the trailhead at the Marina Green park.

== Mechanism ==
Pipes of the Wave Organ

Through a series of 25 PVC pipes, the Wave Organ interacts with the waves of the bay and conveys their sound to listeners at several different stations. The effects produced vary depending on the level of the tide but include rumbles, gurgles, sloshes, hisses, and other more typical wave sounds. The sound is best heard at high tide.

The structure incorporates stone platforms and benches where visitors may sit near the mouths of pipes, listening. The stone pieces used in its construction were salvaged from the demolition of the Laurel Hill Cemetery in San Francisco.

== See also ==
- Blackpool High Tide Organ (in Blackpool, England, UK)
- Sea Organ (in Zadar, Croatia)
- Chillida's Comb of the Wind (in San Sebastián / Donostia, Basque Country, Spain, 1976)
- Biospherical Digital-Optical Aquaphone
