= Nine Views =

Art installation in Zagreb, Croatia

Coordinates: 45.8130174°N 15.9751946°E

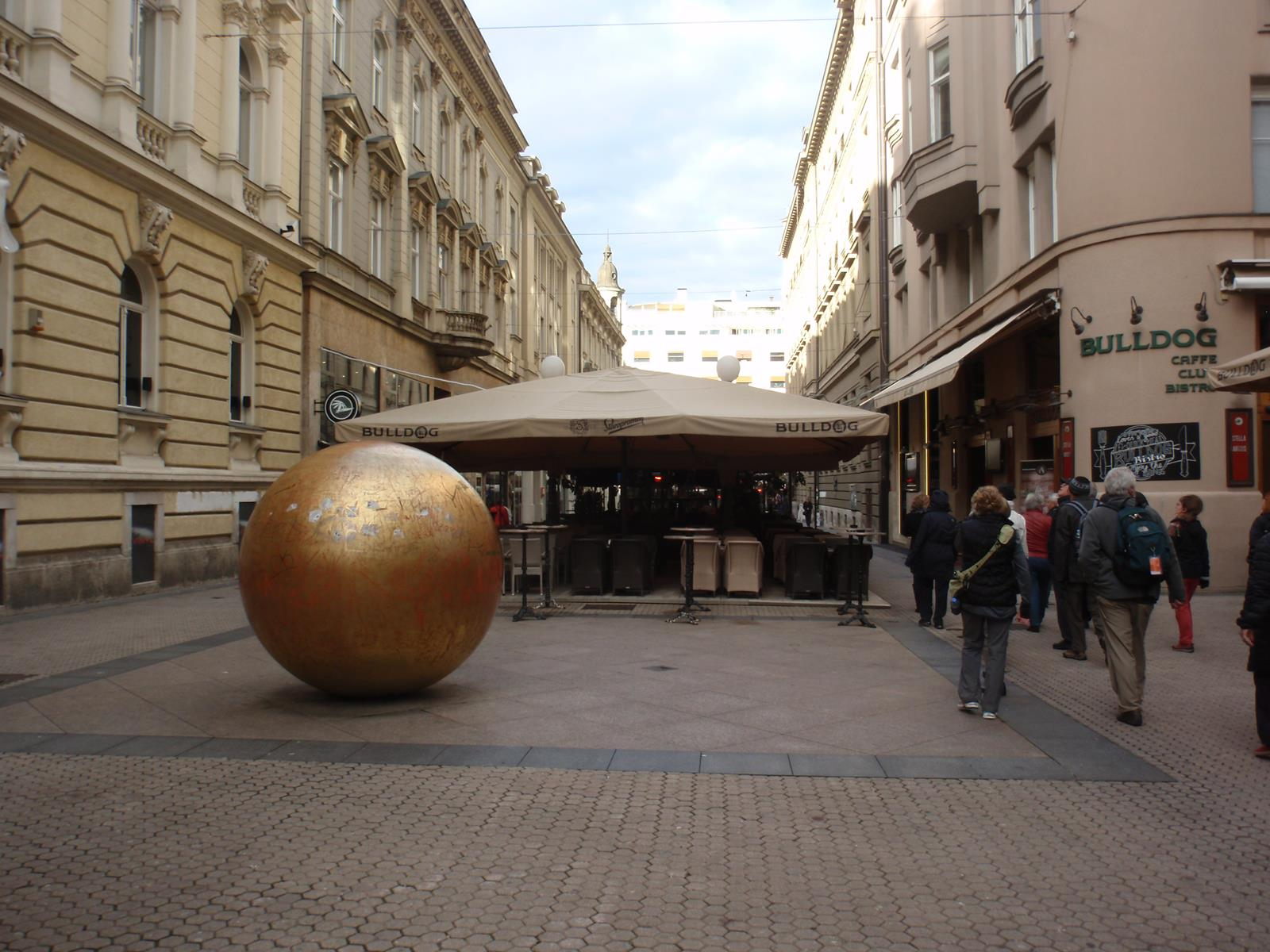
Sun installation

Nine Views (Croatian: Devet pogleda) is an ambiental installation in Zagreb, Croatia which, together with the sculpture Prizemljeno Sunce (The Grounded Sun), comprises a scale model of the Solar System.

Prizemljeno Sunce by Ivan Kožarić was first displayed in 1971 by the building of the Croatian National Theatre, and since then changed location a few times. Since 1994, it has been situated in Bogovićeva Street. It is a bronze sphere around 2 m (6 ft 7 in) in diameter.

In 2004, artist Davor Preis had a two-week exhibition in the Josip Račić Exhibition Hall in Margaretska Street in Zagreb, and afterwards, he placed 9 models of the planets of the Solar System around Zagreb, to complete a model of the entire solar system. The models' sizes as well as their distances from the Prizemljeno Sunce are all in the same scale as the Prizemljeno Sunce itself.

Preis did this installation with very little or no publicity, so his installation is not well known among citizens of Zagreb. On a few occasions, individuals or small groups of people, particularly physics students, "discovered" that there was a model of the Solar System in Zagreb. One of the earliest efforts to find all of the planets was started in November 2004 on the web forum of the student section of the Croatian Physics Society.

The locations of the planets are as follows:

- Mercury - 3 Margaretska Street
- Venus - 3 Ban Josip Jelačić Square
- Earth - 9 Varšavska Street
- Mars - 21 Tkalčićeva Street
- Jupiter - 71 Voćarska Street
- Saturn - 1 Račićeva Street
- Uranus - 9 Siget (not at the residential building but at the garage across the street)
- Neptune - Kozari 17
- Pluto - Bologna Alley (underpass) - included in the installation before being demoted to dwarf planet (someone has since ripped Pluto off, however the plaque remains)

The system is at scale 1:680 000 000. Earth's model is about 1.9 cm (0.75 in) in diameter and is 225 m (246 yd) distance from the Sun's model, while Pluto's model is 7.7 km (4.8 mi) away from it.

== Gallery ==
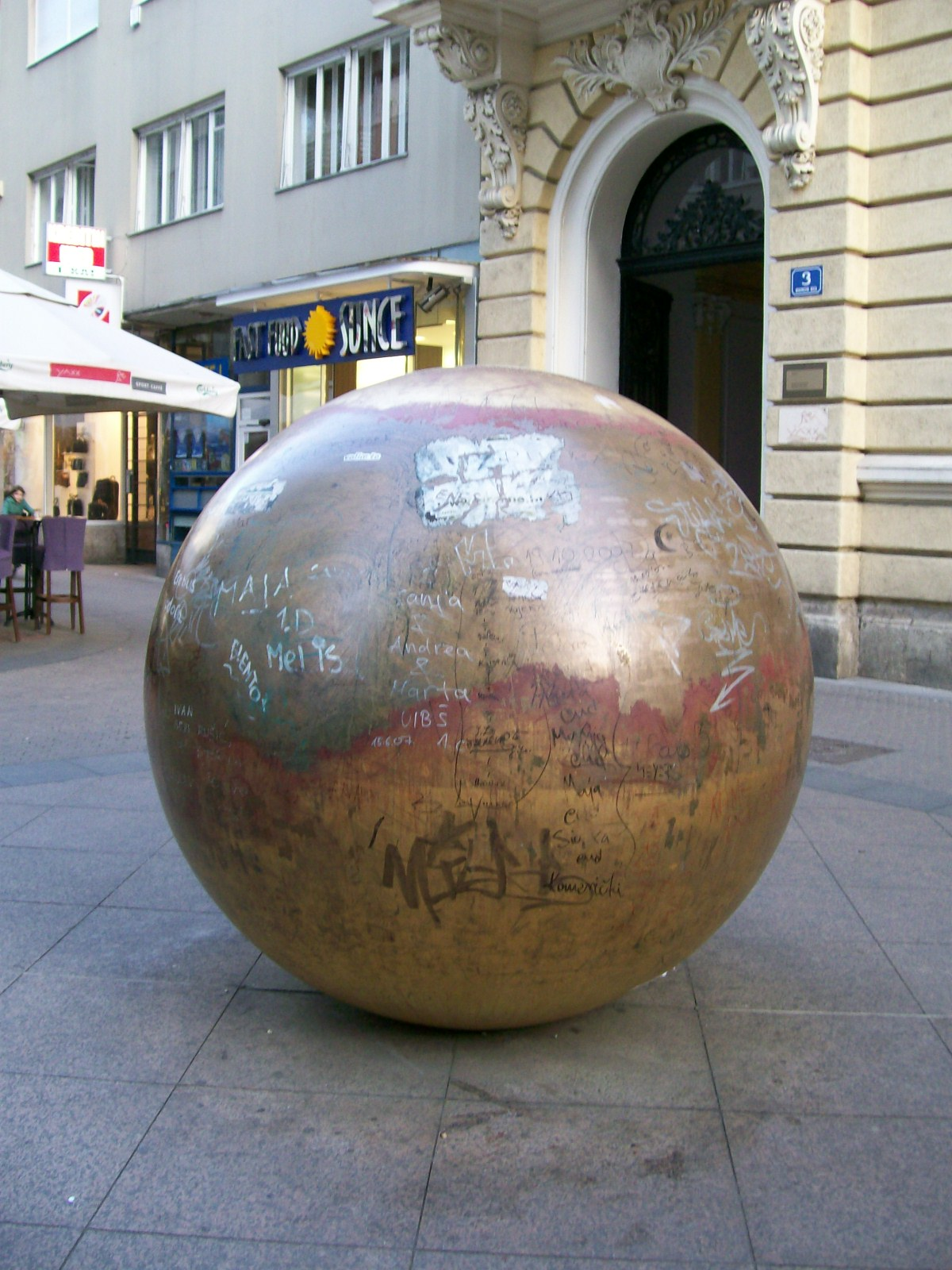
Sun

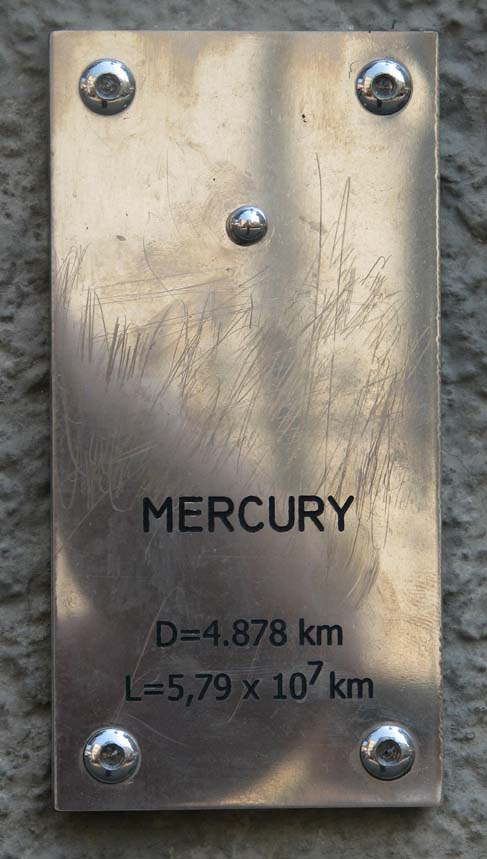
Mercury

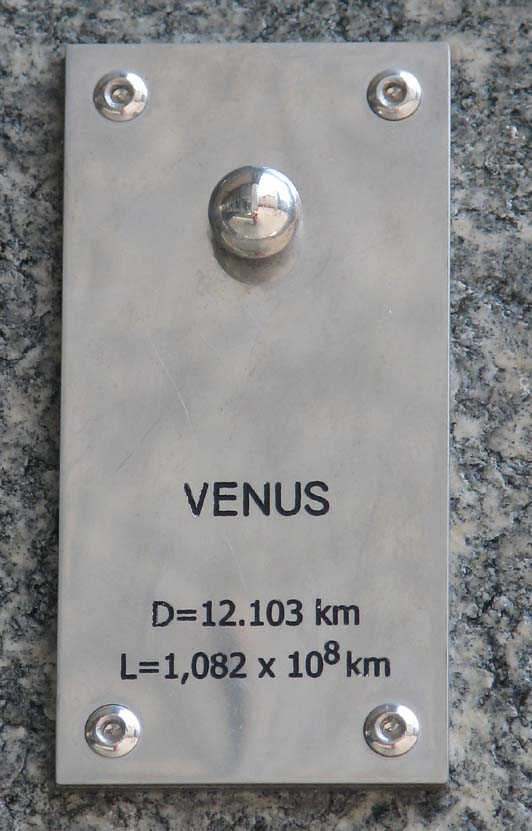
Venus

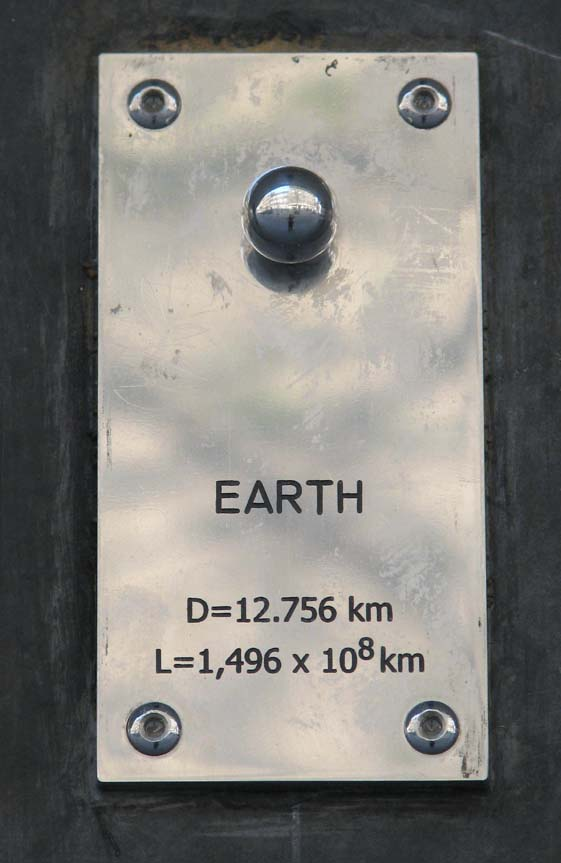
Earth

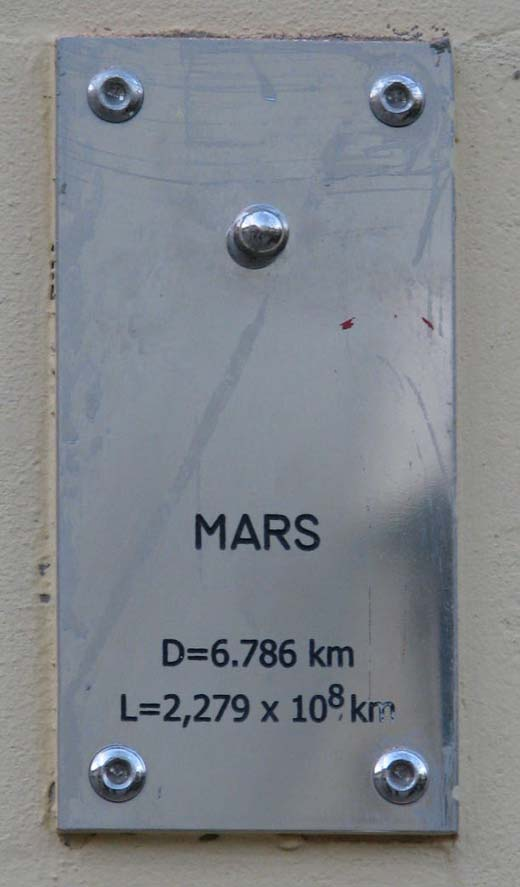
Mars

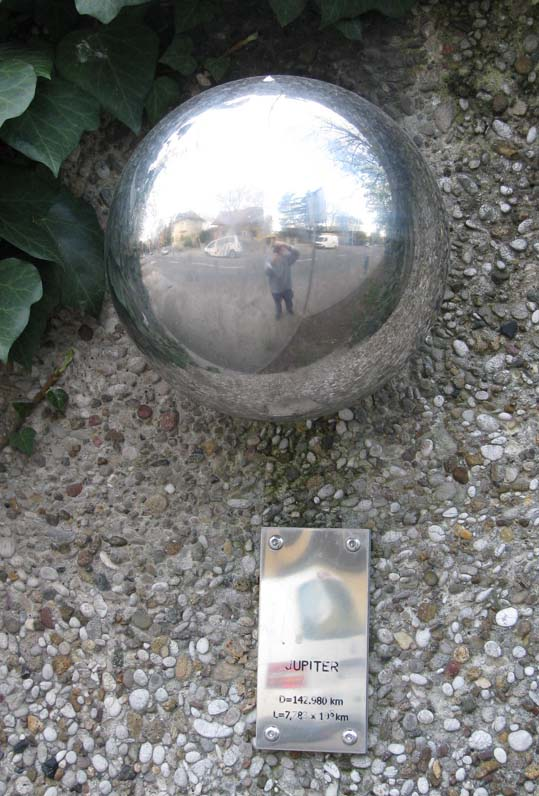
Jupiter

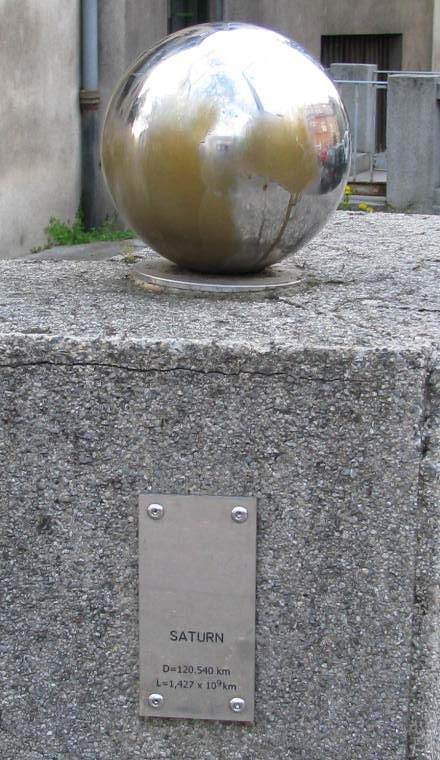
Saturn

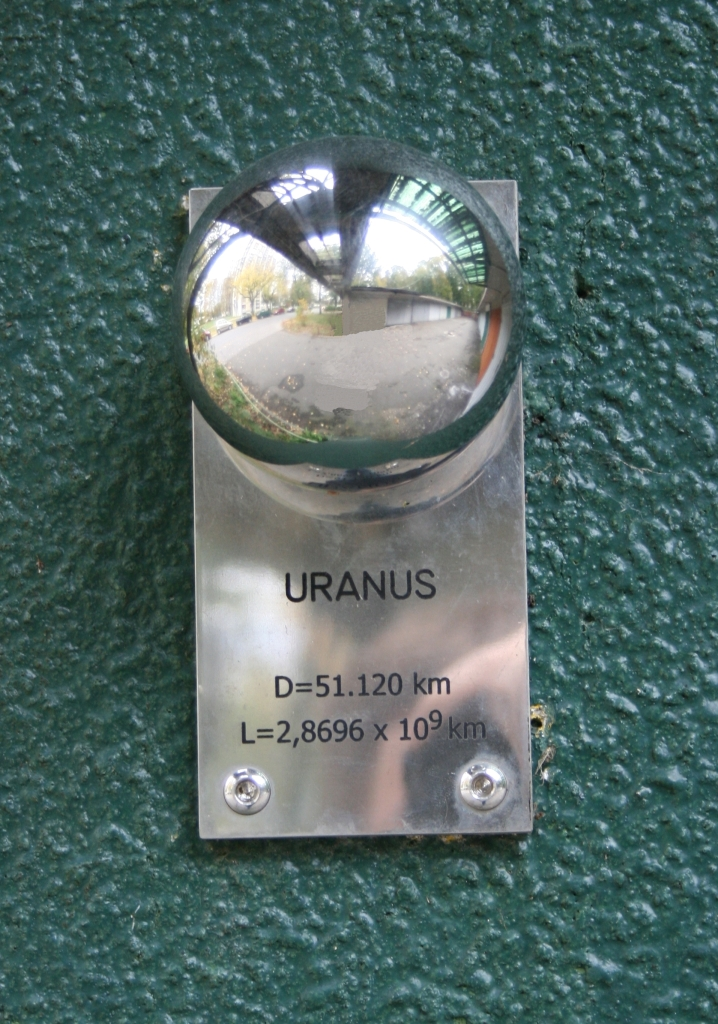
Uranus

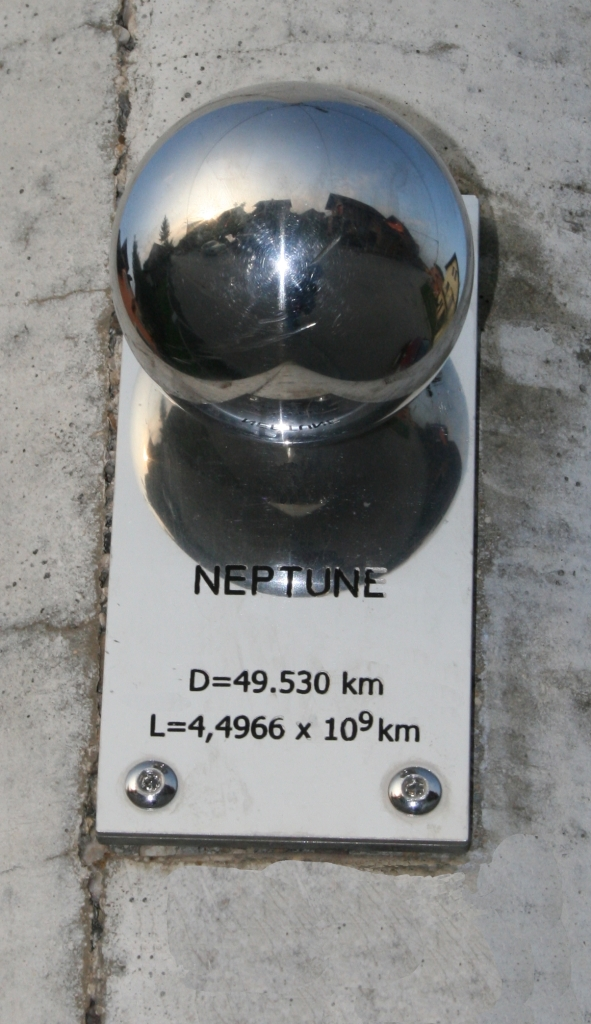
Neptune

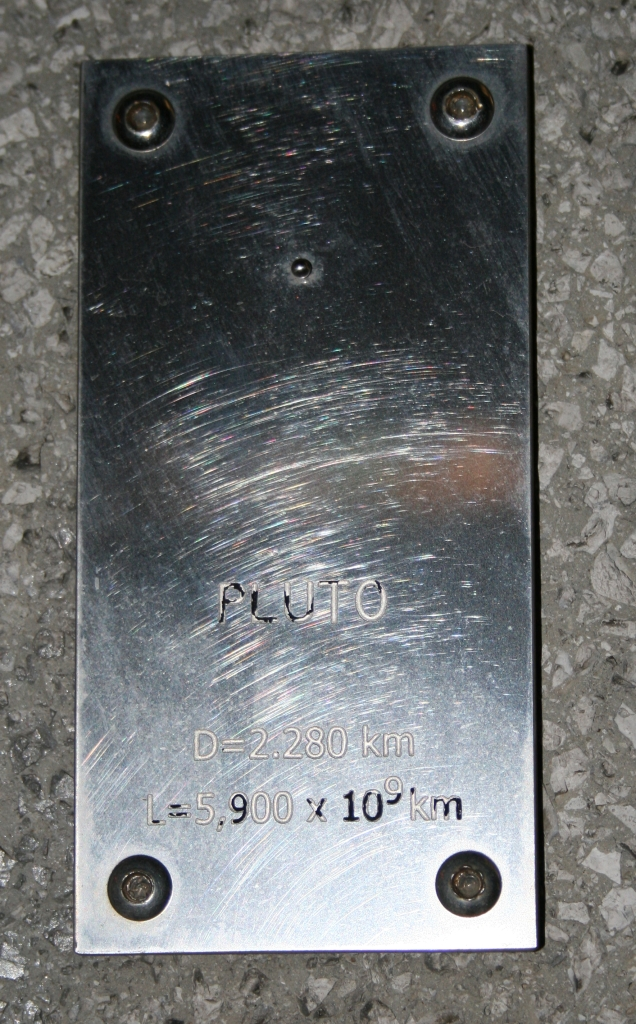
Pluto

== See also ==
- Monument to the Sun, a Solar System model in Zadar, Croatia
- Solar System model
