= Monument to the Sun =

Monument in Zadar, Croatia

Monument to the Sun Greeting to the Sun
- Spomenik suncu Pozdrav suncu
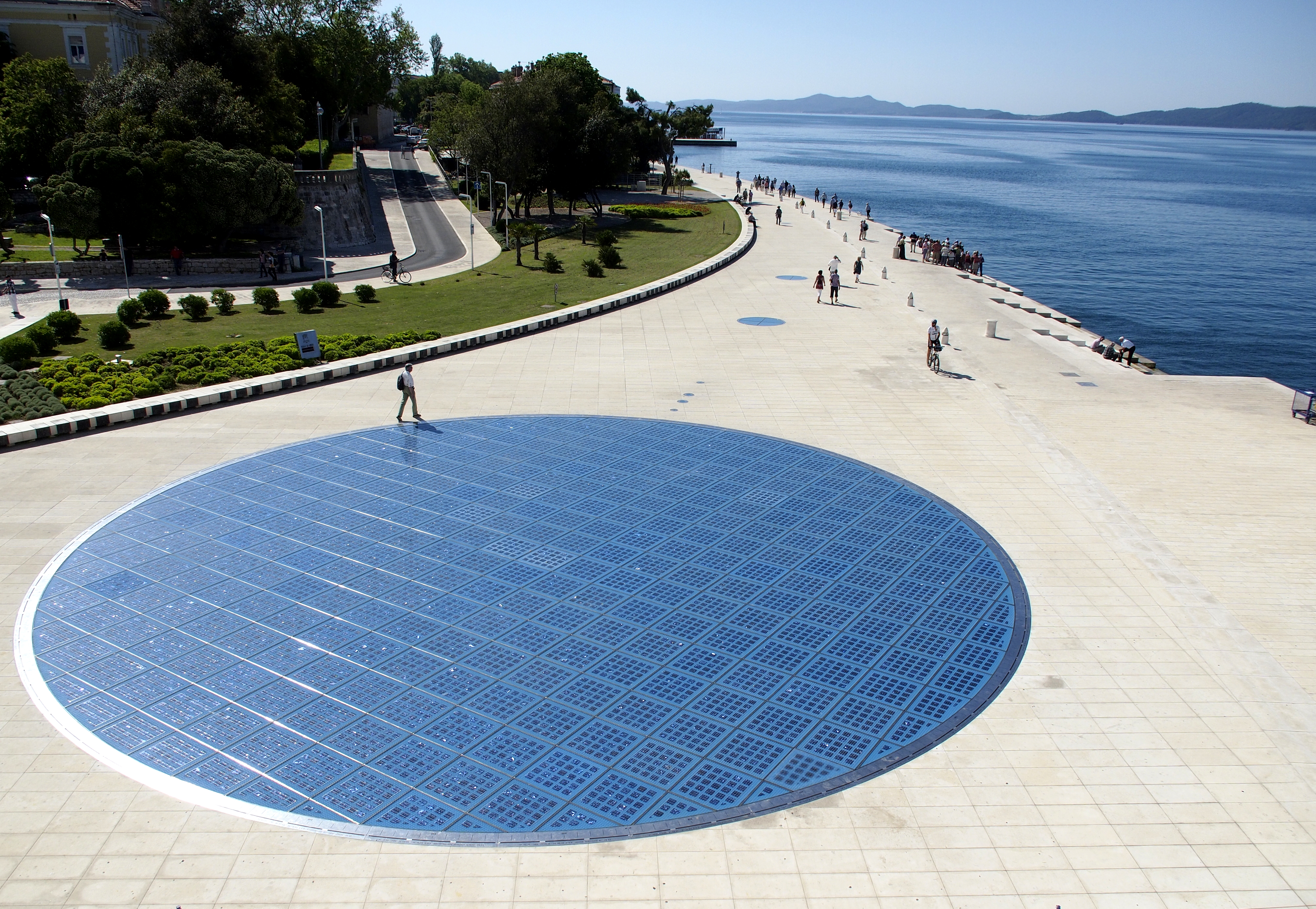
- Monument to the Sun (center) and Sea organ (right)
- Interactive map of Monument to the Sun; Greeting to the Sun
- Coordinates: 44°07′03″N 15°13′11″E
- Designer: Nikola Bašić
- Material: Solar panels
- Completion date: 2008
- Dedicated to: Sun

Monument to the Sun or The Greeting to the Sun (Croatian: Pozdrav suncu) is a monument in Zadar, Croatia dedicated to the Sun. It consists of a 22-meter diameter circle representing the Sun, with three hundred, multi-layered glass plates placed on the same level as the stone-paved waterfront, with photovoltaic solar modules underneath. Lighting elements installed in the circle turn on at night and produce a light show. Smaller circles represent the planets. The monument symbolizes communication with nature, communicates with light, while the nearby Sea organ communicates with sound. The monument to the Sun and the Sea organ were both designed by Croatian architect Nikola Bašić.

== Location ==
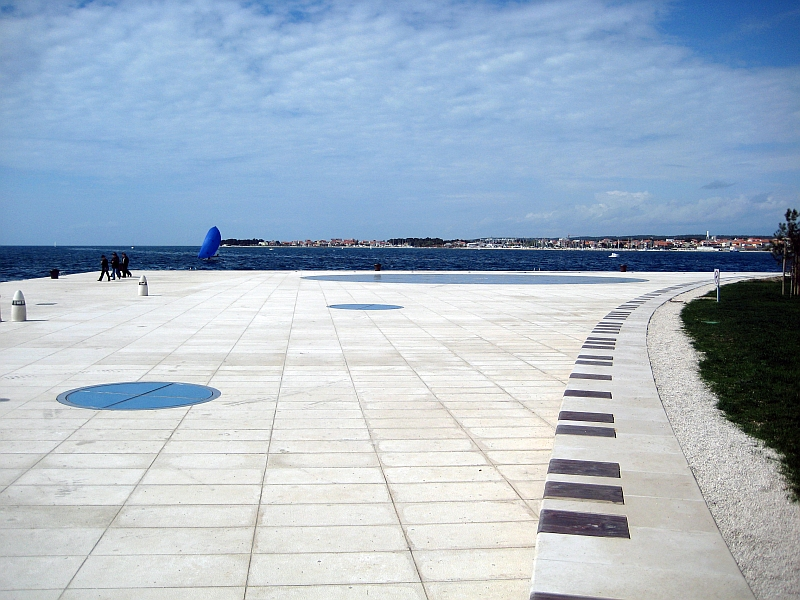
Monument is located on the western point of the Zadar peninsula

The monument is located at the entrance to the port of the Croatian town of Zadar on the western point of the Zadar Peninsula.

== Design ==
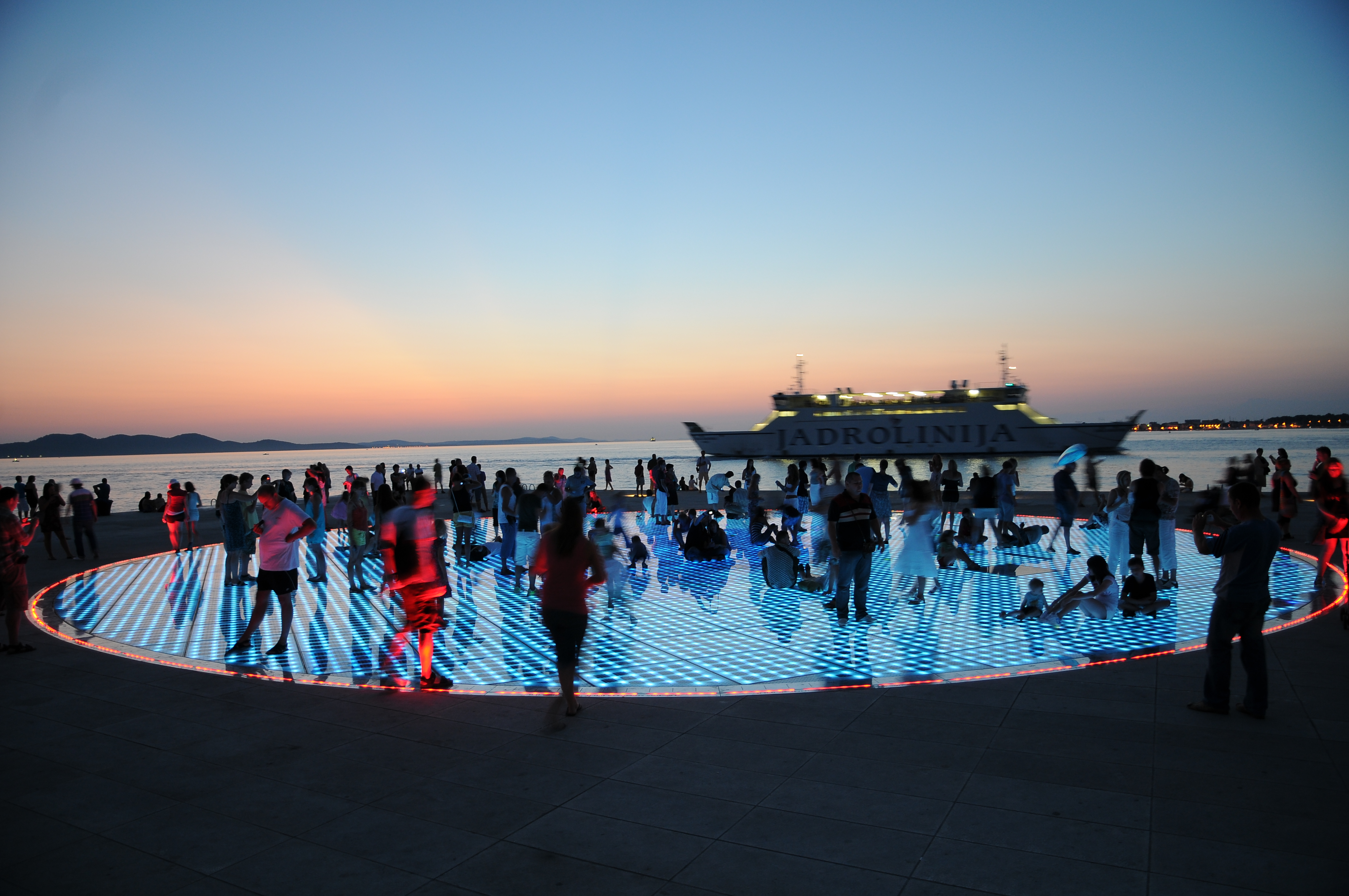
The monument at night

The monument consists of 300 multi-layered glass plates, placed level with the stone paving of the waterfront, arranged in the shape of a 22-meter diameter circle. Beside the main “Sun” installation, looking from the west are similar, smaller installations representing the planets of the Solar System. The size of the Sun and planets are proportional, as well as the distance from the center of each plate, but the size and distance proportions differ as the planets are so far away. Beneath the glass panels are photovoltaic solar modules with lighting elements, which turn on at night to produce a light show.

A chrome ring on the perimeter of the Sun installation is inscribed the names of all titular saints of churches on the Zadar Peninsula. The monument is also a calendar as beside the saints’ names are their feast days, along with the following information for each date: solar declination and solar altitude north or south of the equator (DEC minimum of -23° to a maximum of 23°); the length of sunlight in the meridian on that date and at the waterfront. This was prepared in cooperation with marine scientist Professor Maksim Klarin from Zadar Maritime School, who also programmed the light show's start and end times for 50 years starting in 2008.

The planetary installations meanwhile have similar rings, inscribed with their name in Croatian as well as their astronomical symbol.

=== Solar modules ===
The photovoltaic solar modules absorb light energy, transform it into electricity, and release it into the power network. The entire system annually produces about 46,500 kWh, producing half the energy needed by the Zadar waterfront.

== Cost ==
The construction cost was 8 million kunas (excluding VAT) (c. 1,3 million euros), while the overall cost (including landscaping) totaled 50 million kunas (c. 7 million euros). Maintenance due to its exposure to sunlight, moisture and salt from 2008-2013 totaled around 700 thousand kunas. An extensive renovation and upgrade project worth 4 million kunas was completed in March 2019.

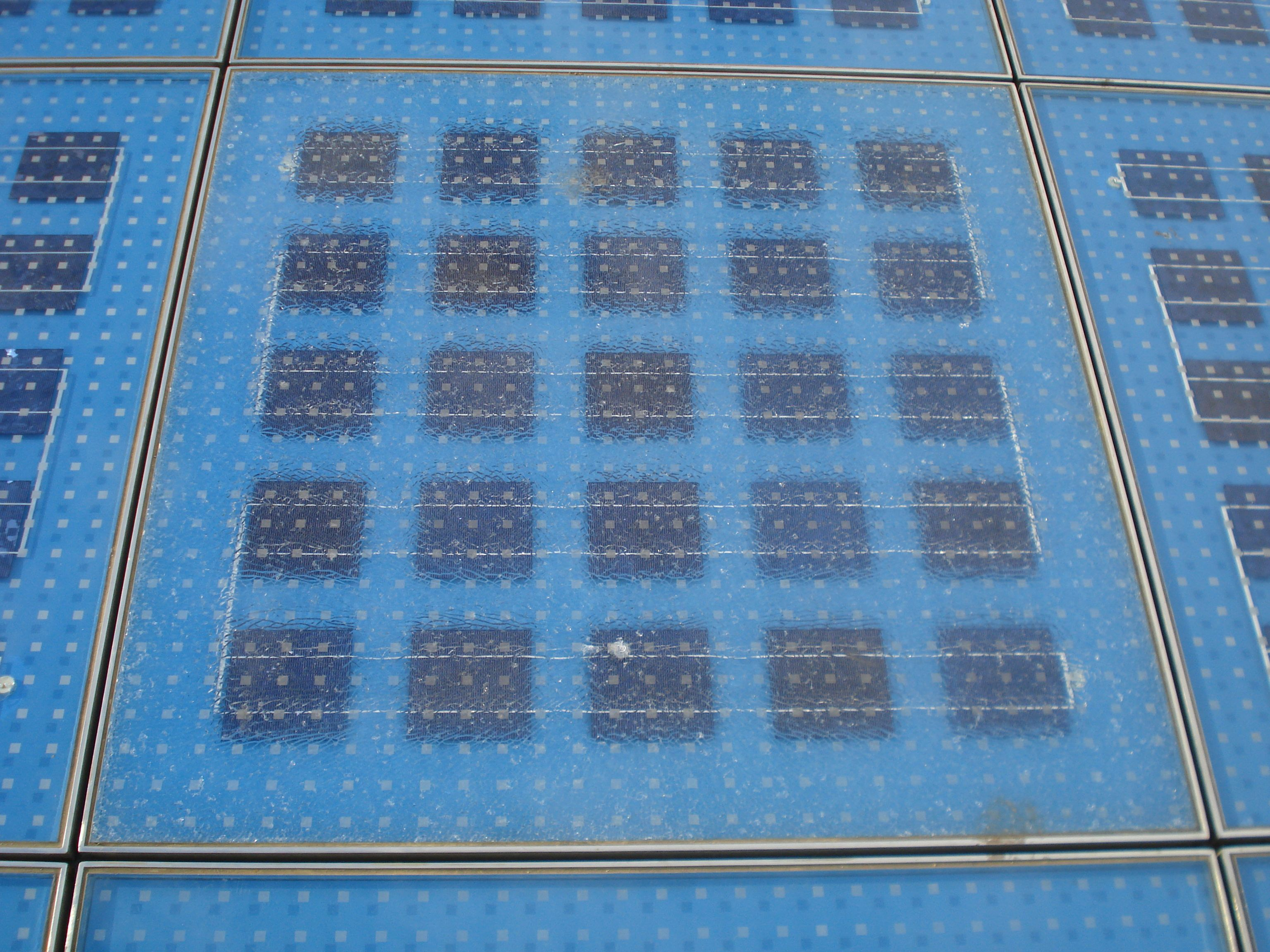
Vandalized solar module

== Vandalism ==
Damage, such as cracks on solar modules, have been seen on several occasions, mostly on the Sun installation, where 12 solar modules have been damaged, as well as on the Jupiter and Saturn installations. The cracks were caused by a 3500 kg pickup truck that drove over the modules. The City added a 24-hour supervisor and surveillance cameras. In June 2009, an unidentified object smashed four modules, and on the night of August 8, two more. On May 5, 2019, a young man smashed modules with a hammer, causing €90,000 worth of damage.

== Gallery ==
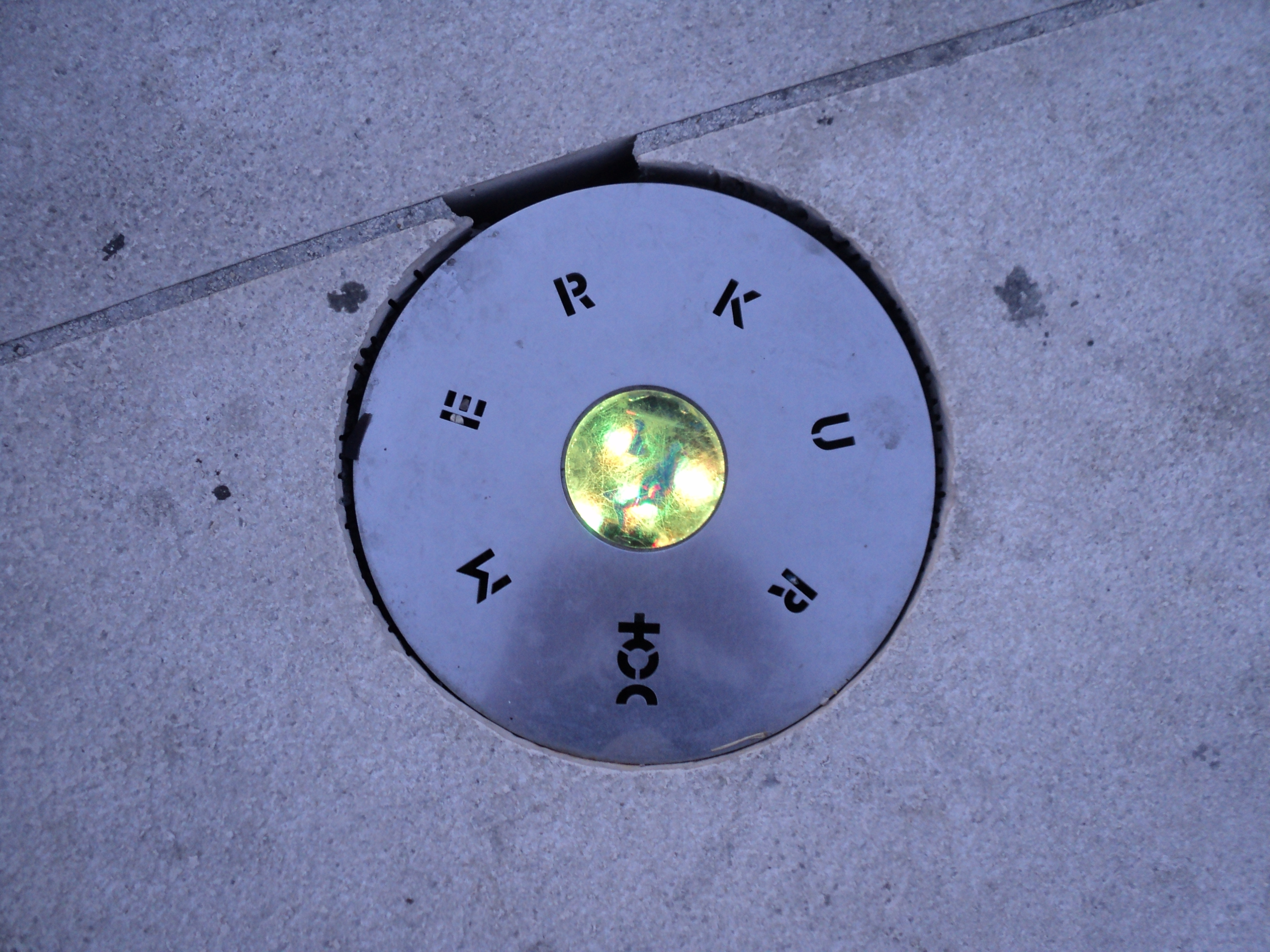
Mercury

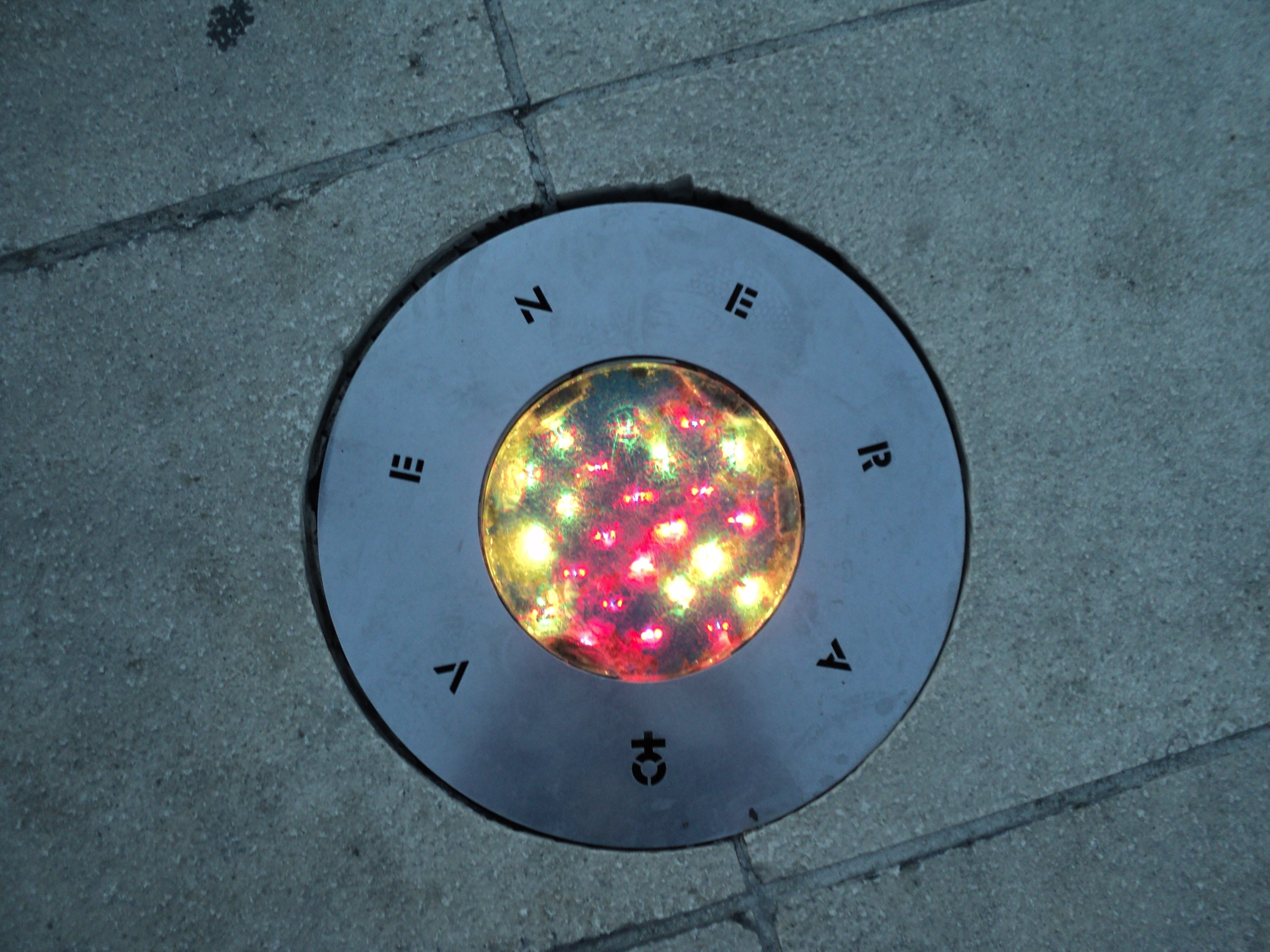
Venus

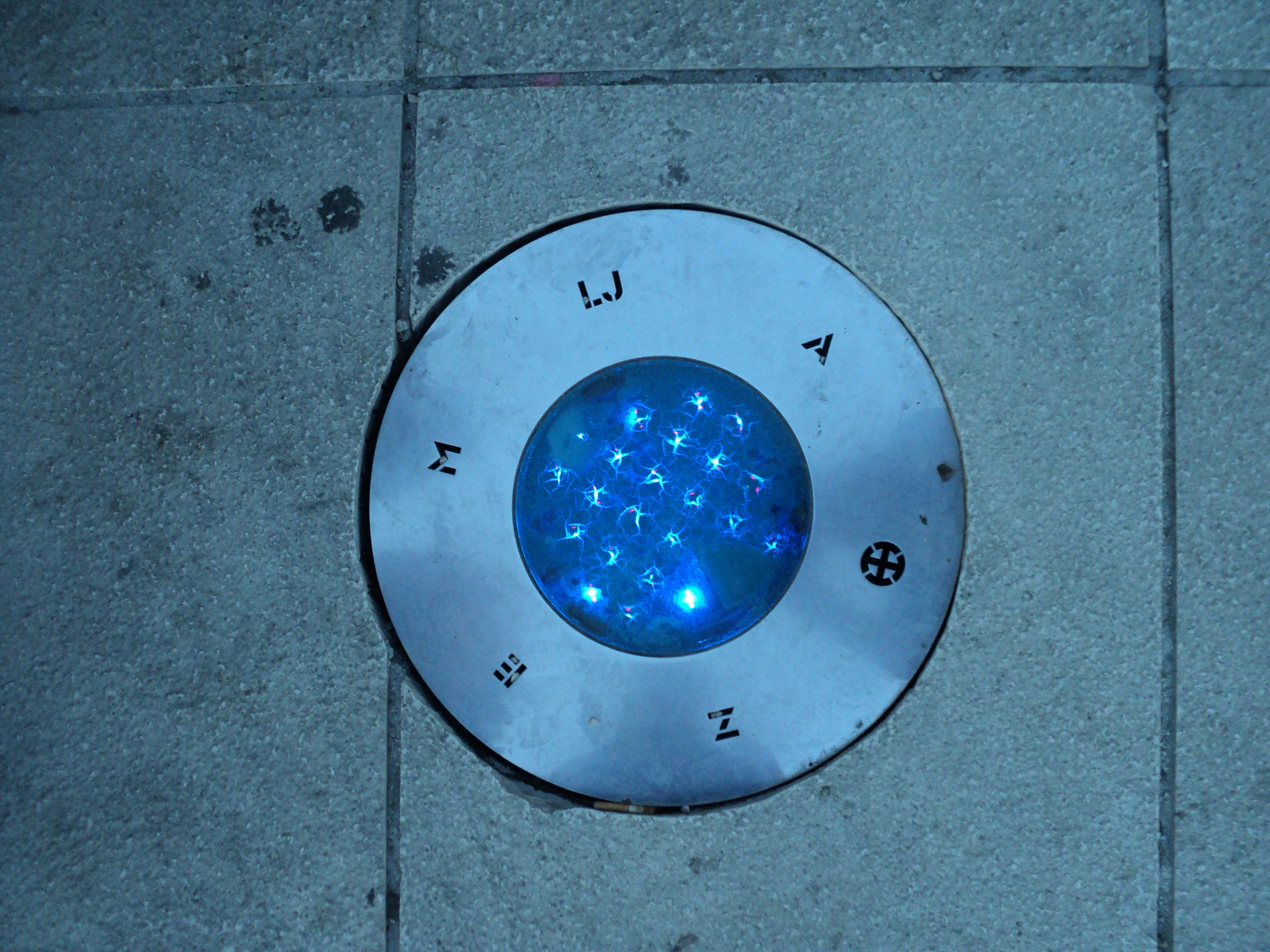
Earth

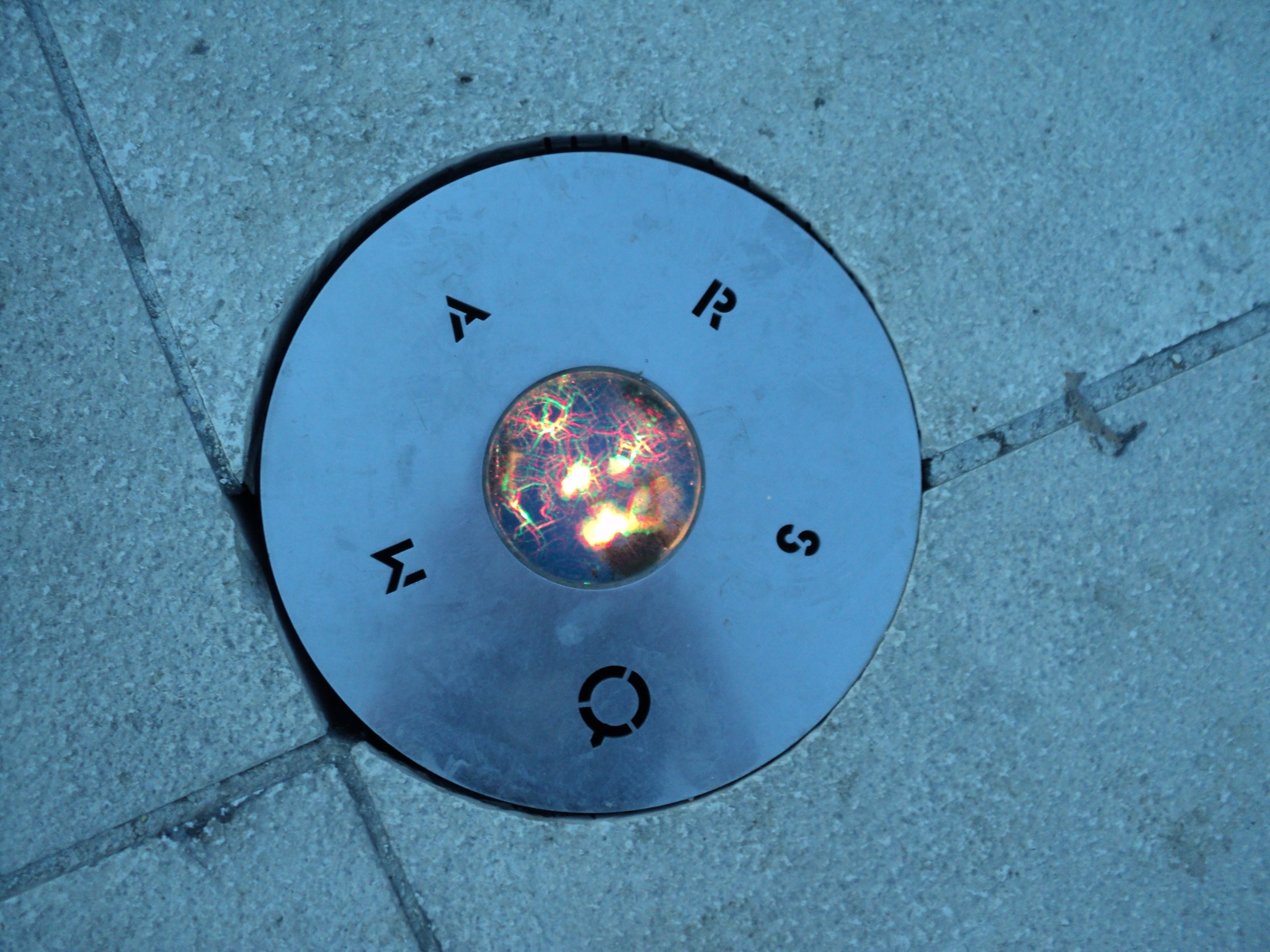
Mars

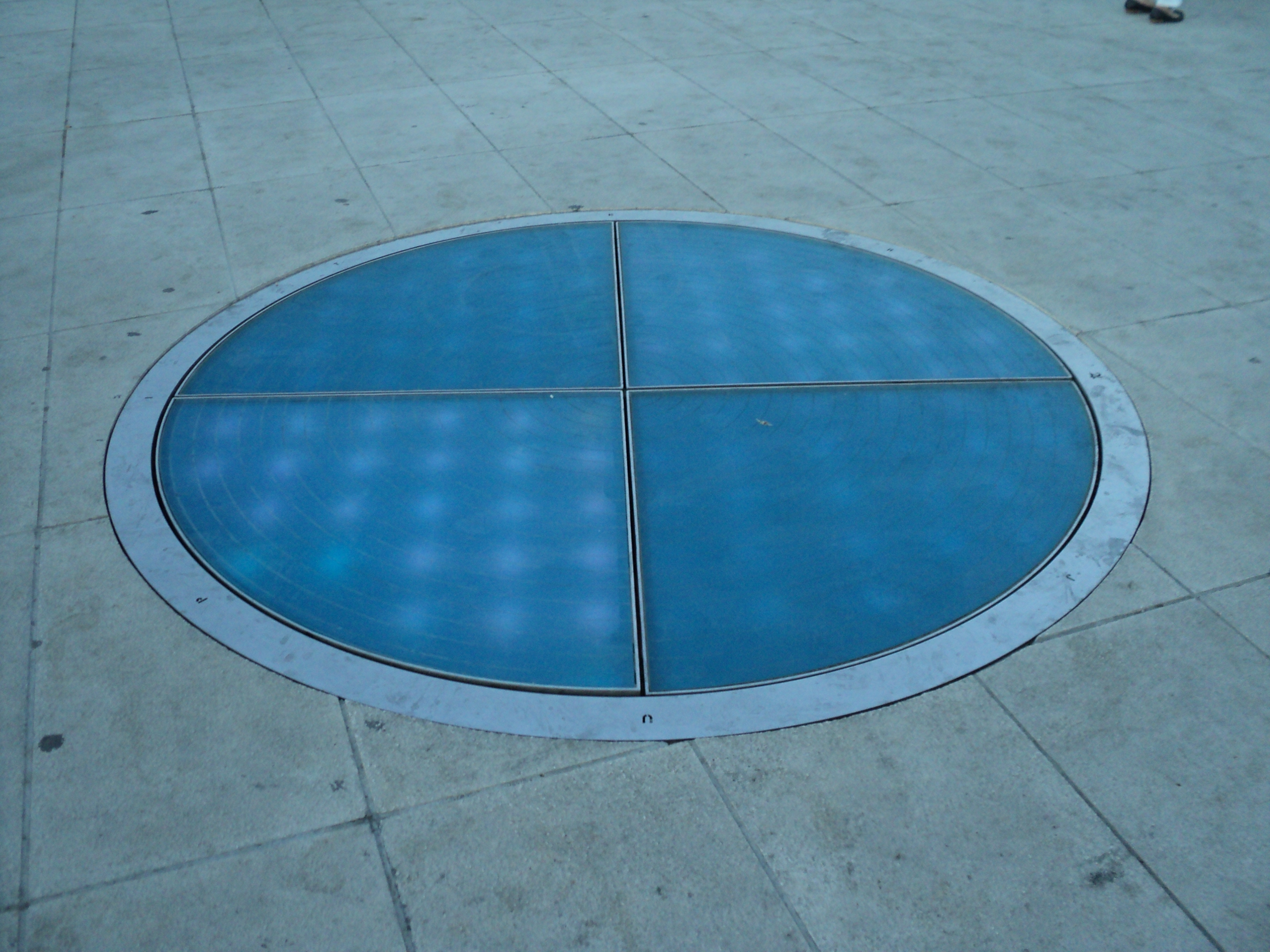
Jupiter

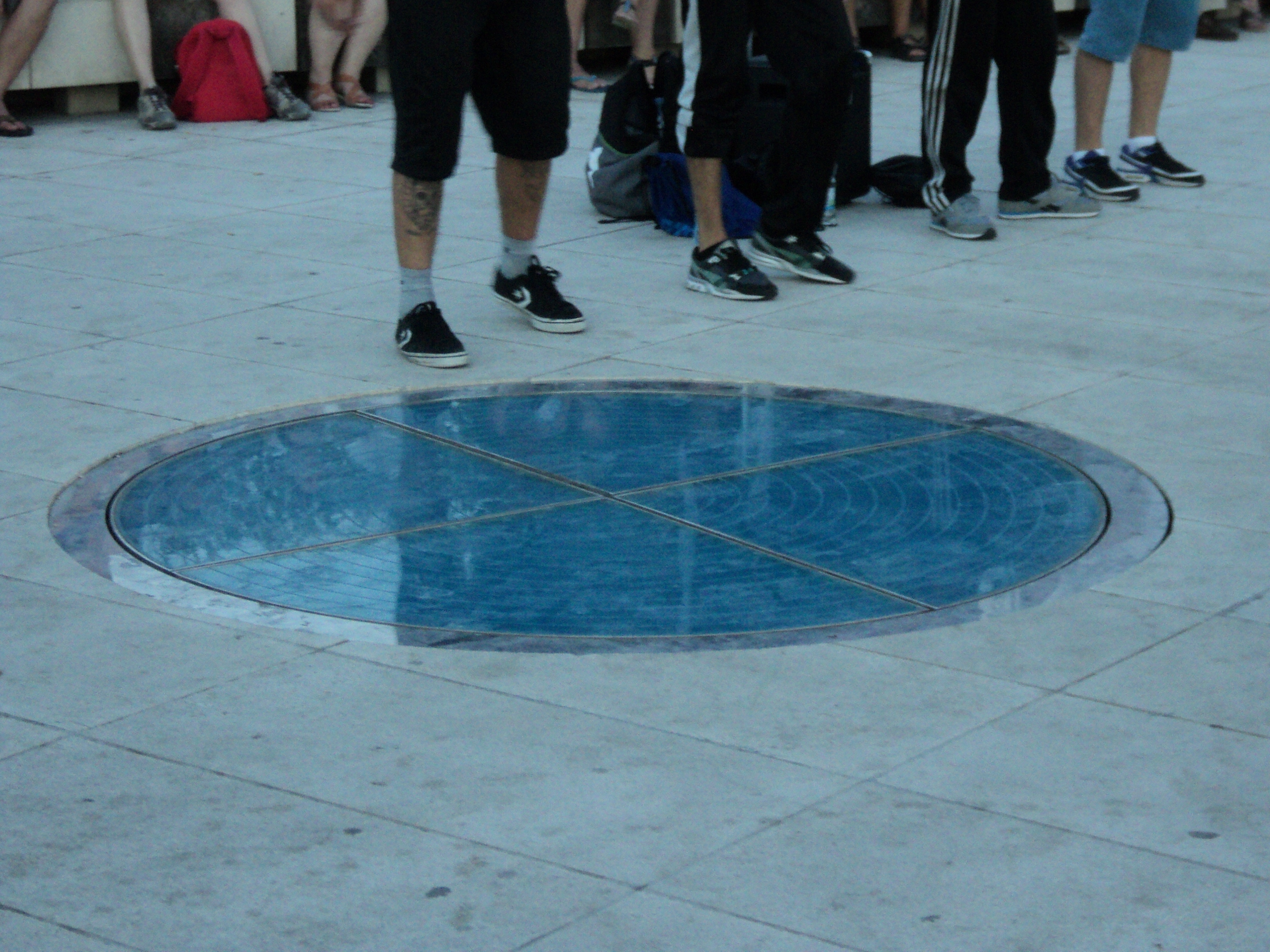
Saturn

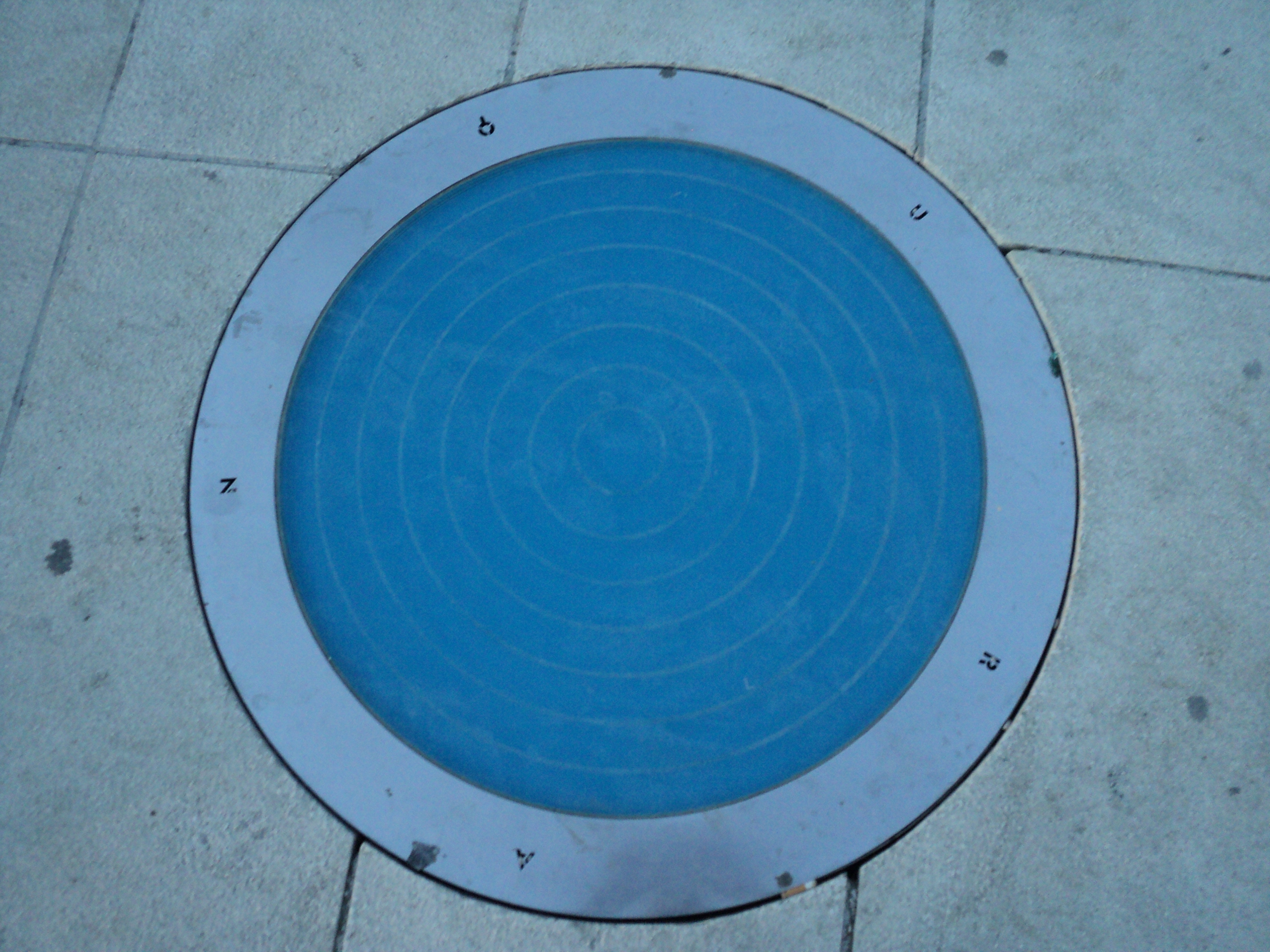
Uranus

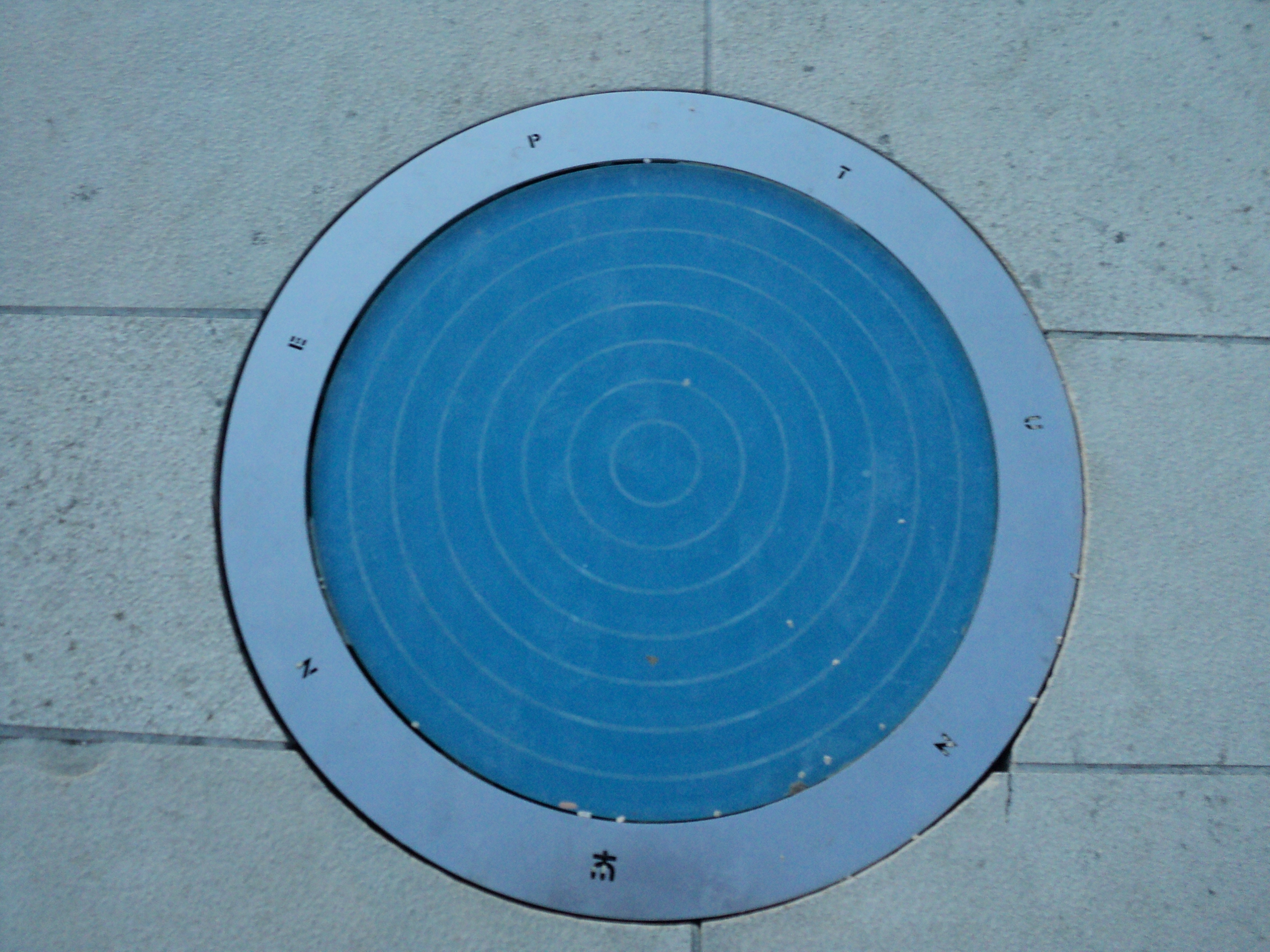
Neptune

== See also ==
- Zadar
- Architecture of Croatia
- Nine Views, a Solar System model in Zagreb, Croatia
