= Sea organ =

Musical art installation in Croatia

Coordinates: 44°07′02″N 15°13′12″E

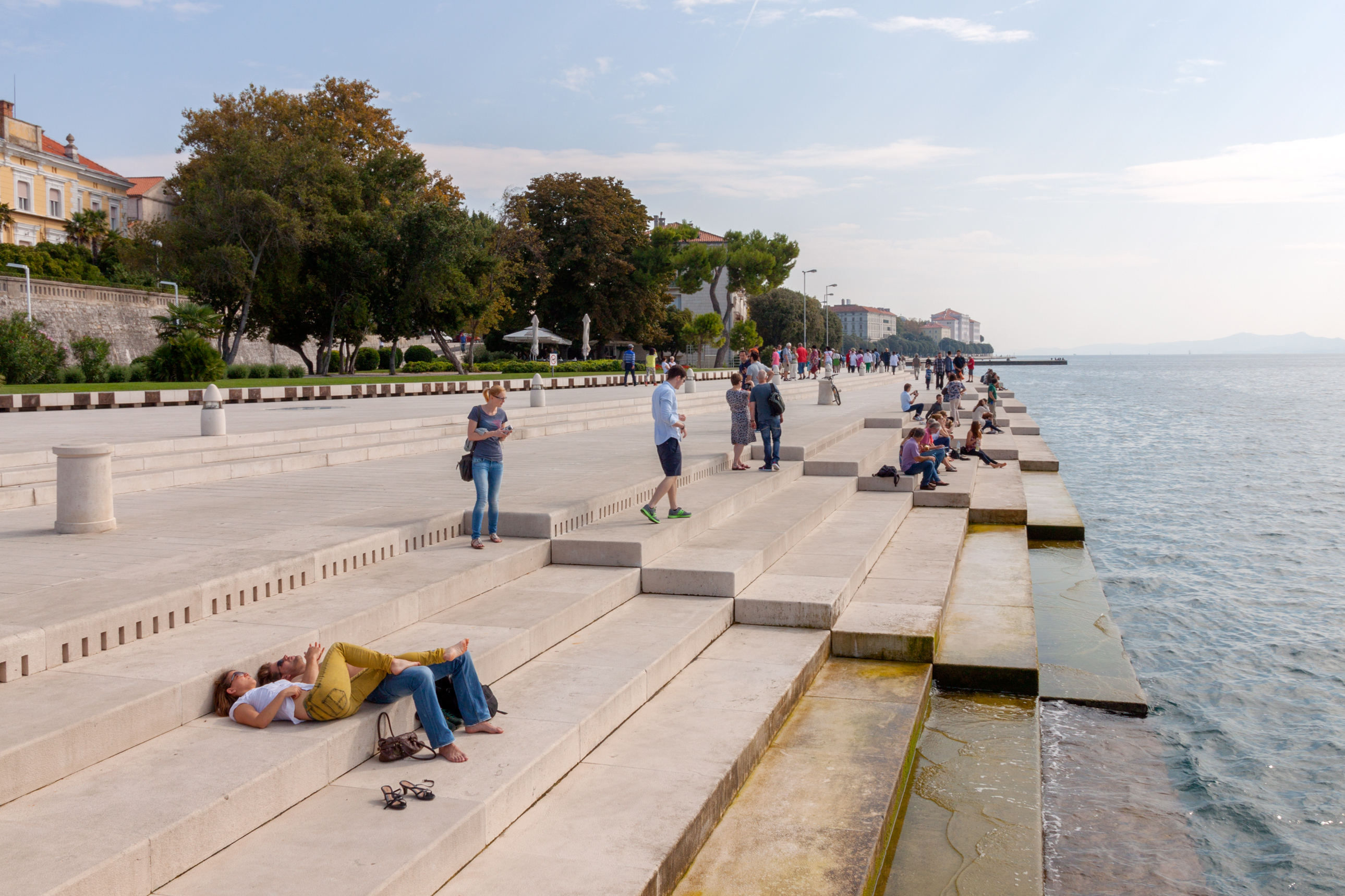
Sea organ in scaled form—the sound emerges from the holes along the top step

A sound recording of the sea organ.

The Sea organ (Croatian: Morske orgulje) is an architectural sound art object located in Zadar, Croatia and an experimental musical instrument, which plays music by way of sea waves and tubes located underneath a set of large marble steps.

== History ==
Chaotic reconstruction work was undertaken to repair the devastation Zadar suffered in the Second World War. The frantic reconstruction turned much of the sea front into an unbroken, monotonous concrete wall.

The device was made by the architect Nikola Bašić as part of the project to redesign the new city coast (Nova rive) and the site was opened to the public on 15 April 2005. The waves interact with the organ and create somewhat random but harmonic sounds. Bašić also designed the nearby Monument to the Sun.

The Sea Organ has drawn tourists and locals alike. White marble steps leading down to the water were built later. Concealed under these steps, which both protect and invite, is a system of polyethylene tubes and a resonating cavity.

In 2006, the Sea Organ was awarded with the prize ex-aequo of the fourth edition of the European Prize for Urban Public Space.

== See also ==
- List of Croatian inventions and discoveries
- Wave Organ (in San Francisco, California, USA)
- Blackpool High Tide Organ (in Blackpool, England, UK)
- Chillida's Comb of the Wind (in San Sebastián / Donostia, Basque Country, Spain)
- Yeosu New North Port Wave Organ
- Water organ
- Hydraulophone
