= Blackpool High Tide Organ =

Former tidal organ in England

Coordinates: 53°47′35″N 3°03′29″W

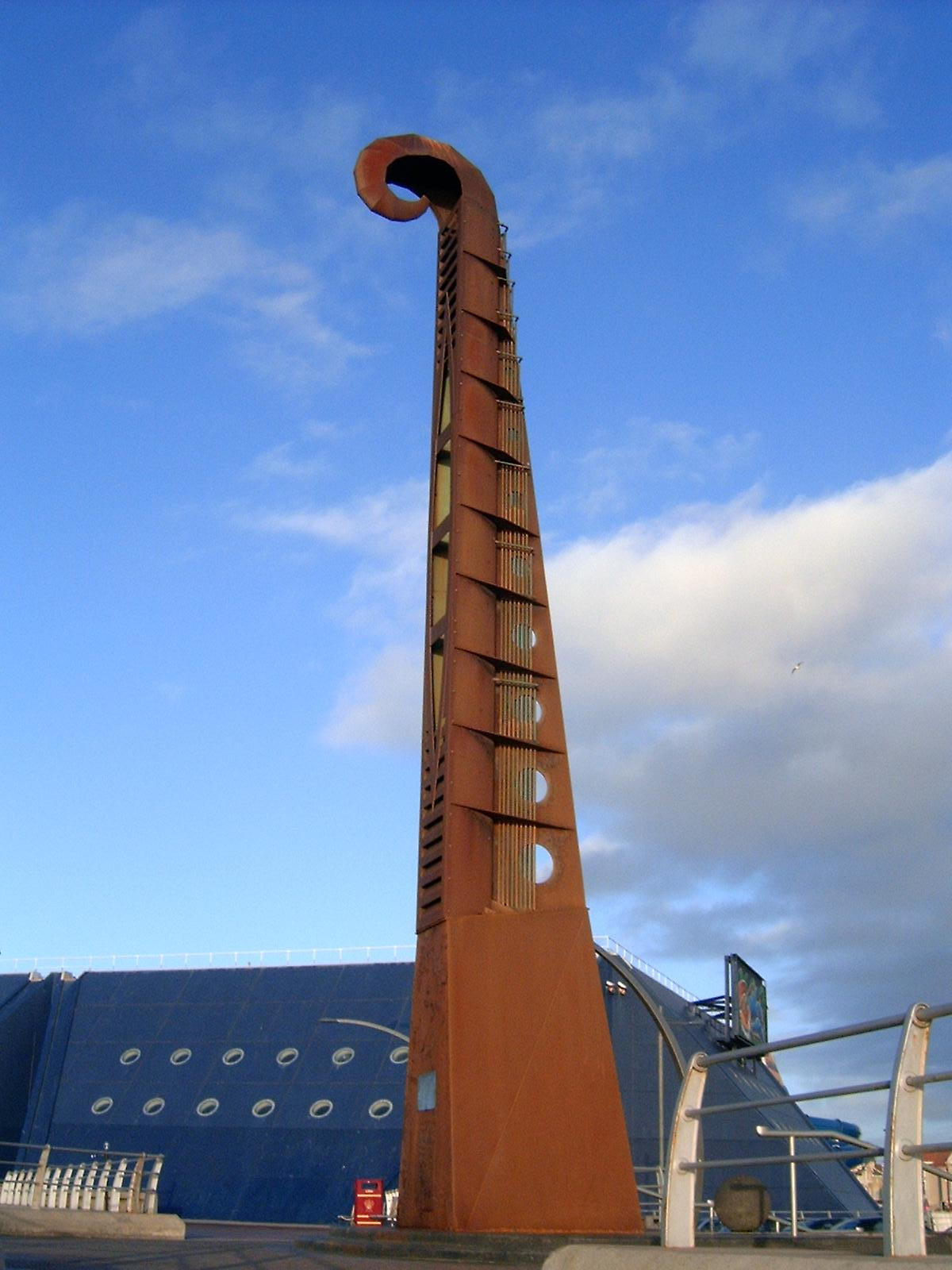
Blackpool's High Tide Organ viewed from its side

Audio recording of the High Tide Organ

The High Tide Organ was a tidal organ 15 metres (49 ft 3 in) tall constructed in 2002 as part of "The Great Promenade Show" series of sculptures situated along Blackpool's New Promenade in the UK. It was removed in early 2022. The artwork, described as a "musical manifestation of the sea", is one of a few examples of a tidal organ; others include the San Francisco Wave Organ and the Sea Organ in Croatia.

== Design ==
The sculpture was designed by the artists Liam Curtin and John Gooding, and was constructed in concrete, steel, zinc and copper sheet. The harnessing of wave energy, and the sculpting of the concrete and metals, is said to produce a unique interpretation of Blackpool's natural and man-made environments.

The instrument is played by the sea at high tide through eight pipes attached to the sea wall. These are connected under the promenade to 18 organ pipes within the sculpture. The swell of seawater at high tide pushes air up the sea-wall pipes and causes the organ pipes to sound. The best time to hear the High Tide Organ is two to three hours before or after high tide. On very calm days the organ is silent for part of its cycle. The pitches of the pipes are based on the harmonic series in B flat.

The High Tide Organ is one of a small group of musical instruments that operate without further human intervention, among which the aeolian harp and the wind chime are the most notable.

== History ==
In 2019, Curtin made an official complaint regarding the state of the instrument, alleging a lack of maintenance had caused safety concerns. After inspection, a health and safety surveyor determined that the instrument needed annual safety checks.

In 2021, Curtin called for the instrument to be demolished, stating that "For almost 20 years, I’ve been begging the council to maintain this and other works, in some cases for public safety reasons. I have even, at my own cost, done some maintenance on it myself." The heavily corroded sculpture was removed in December 2021.

== See also ==
- Singing Ringing Tree
- Chillida's Comb of the Wind (in San Sebastián / Donostia, Basque Country, Spain)
