= Feebly compact space =

Mathematics concept

In mathematics, a topological space is feebly compact if every locally finite cover by nonempty open sets is finite. The concept was introduced by Sibe Mardešić and P. Papić in 1955.

Some facts:

- Every compact space is feebly compact.
- Every feebly compact paracompact space is compact.
- Every feebly compact space is pseudocompact but the converse is not necessarily true.
- For a completely regular Hausdorff space the properties of being feebly compact and pseudocompact are equivalent.
- Any maximal feebly compact space is submaximal.
