= Sibe Mardešić =

- Born: 20 June 1927; Bergedorf, Germany
- Died: 18 June 2016
- Education: University of Zagreb
- Known for: Mardešić's factorization theorem Shape theory Feebly compact space Mardešić trick Shape fibration Strong shape theory
- Scientific career
- Fields: Mathematics
- Thesis: Homoloska svojstva nekih funkcionalnih prostora (Homological Properties of Some Function Spaces) (1957)
- Doctoral advisor: Željko Marković
- Doctoral students: Nikita Shekutkovski

Sibe Mardešić (June 20, 1927 - June 18, 2016) was a Croatian mathematician.

== Life and education ==
Sibe Mardešić was born in June 1927, in Bergedorf (near Hamburg, Germany), where his parents temporarily resided before moving to Chile. After that, they returned to Split, where he completed elementary school and high school. Soon after World War II he went to Zagreb to study mathematics. After graduation he took a job as an assistant at the Department of Mathematics of the University of Zagreb, where he stayed until his retirement in 1991. He was a full member of the Croatian Academy of Arts and Sciences, a corresponding member of the Slovenian Academy of Sciences and Arts and a Fellow of the American Mathematical Society.

== Work ==
Mardešić was a topologist who worked in all main branches of topology having published 148 research papers, 40 professional articles and 18 books. With Jack Segal, he developed an alternate approach to shape theory using inverse systems method of ANRs generalizing Borsuk's shape theory to include all compact Hausdorff spaces, independently of Tim Porter and Włodzimierz Holsztyński. Later he extended Holsztyński's theory for compact Hausdorff spaces to all topological spaces. He introduced the first factorization theorem in dimension theory, the Mardešić Factorization Theorem. With P. Papić he introduced the notion of feebly compact spaces.

He died on June 18, 2016, in Zagreb.

== Selected publications ==
- S. Mardesic; P. Papic (1955). "Sur les espaces dont toute transformation réelle continue est bornée". Hrvatsko Prirodno Društvo. Glasnik Mat.-Fiz. Astron. 10: 225–232.
- Sibe Mardešić (1960). "On covering dimension and inverse limits of compact spaces". Illinois Journal of Mathematics. 4 (2): 278–291. doi:10.1215/ijm/1255455869.
- Sibe Mardešić; Jack Segal (1963). "e-mappings onto polyhedra". Transactions of the American Mathematical Society. doi:10.1090/s0002-9947-1963-0158367-x.
- Sibe Mardešić; Jack Segal (1970). "Movable compacta and ANR-systems". Bull. Acad. Polon. Sci. Sér. Sci. Math. Astron. Phys. 18: 649–654.
- Sibe Mardešić; Jack Segal (1971). "Shapes of compacta and ANR-systems". Fundamenta Mathematicae. 72 (1): 41–59. doi:10.4064/fm-72-1-41-59.
- Sibe Mardešić (1973). "Shapes for topological spaces". General Topology and Its Applications. 3 (3): 265–282. doi:10.1016/0016-660X(72)90018-9.
- S. Mardesic (1978). "Shape theory". Proceedings of the International Congress of Mathematicians.
- S. Mardesic; J. Segal (1982). "Shape theory". Elsevier.
