= Nikola Bašić =

Croatian architect

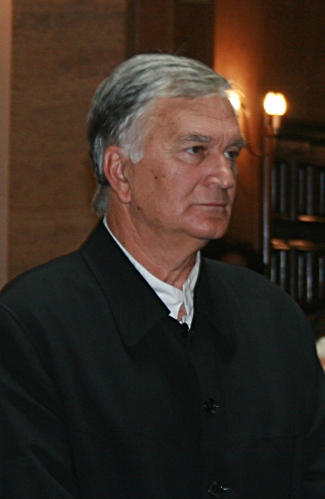
Bašić in 2008

Nikola Bašić (born 1946) is a Croatian architect internationally known for the conception of the Sea Organ in Zadar. He was born on the island of Murter and eventually attended the gymnasium in Zadar. In Sarajevo, he graduated from the Faculty of Architecture and Urbanism. Bašić followed up the Sea Organ with another work on the promenade, just metres away, called the Greeting to the Sun (Pozdrav Suncu). The circular work is powered by the sun and lights up with random patterns and colours. In 2010, Bašić created a memorial to firemen killed in 2007 fighting a wildfire. The work -- the Field of Crosses -- is a set of walls shaped like crosses on the island of Kornat.
