= The Comb of the Wind =

Group of three sculptures by Eduardo Chillida

- Spanish: El Peine del Viento, Basque: Haizearen Orrazia
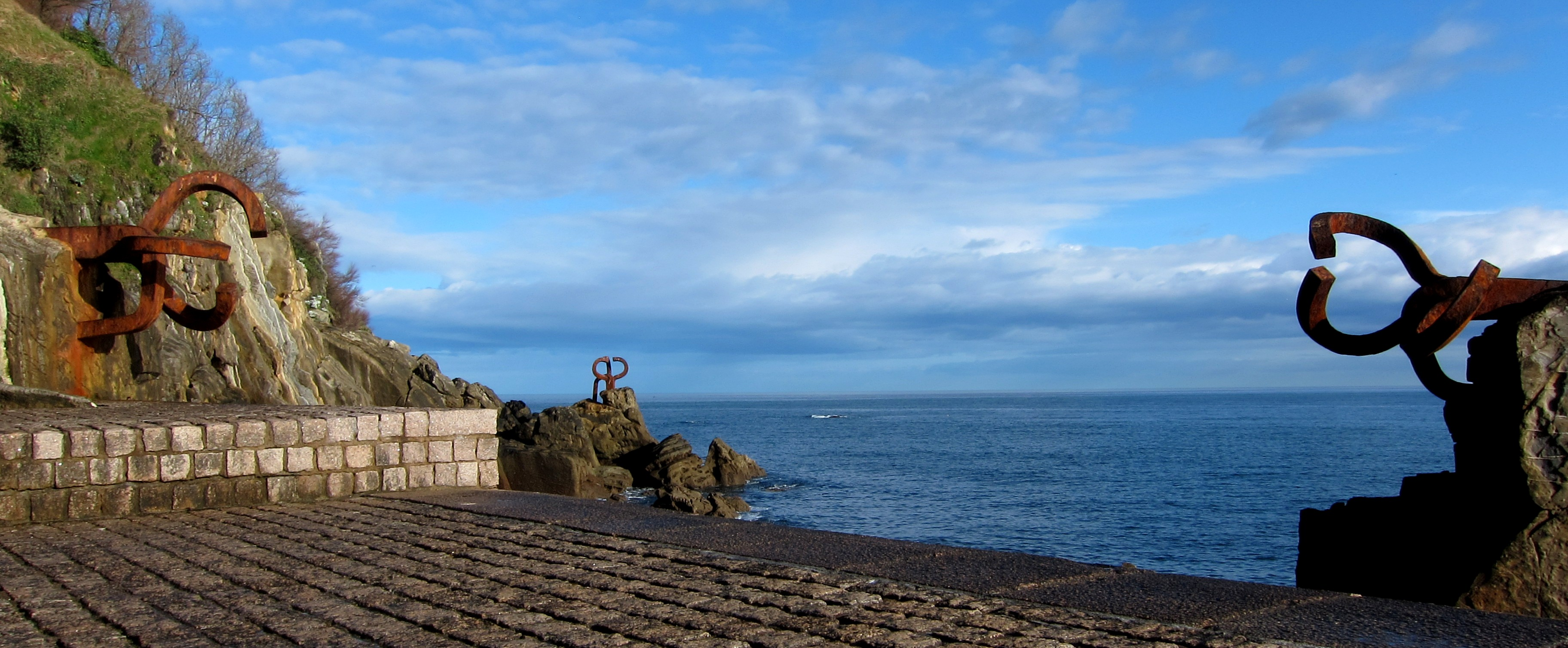
- Artist: Eduardo Chillida
- Year: 1977
- Medium: steel
- Location: San Sebastián, Gipuzkoa, Spain
- 43°19′18.39″N 2°0′20.41″W
- Website: The Comb of the Wind

The Comb of the Wind (Basque: Haizearen orrazia XV, Spanish: Peine del Viento XV) is a collection of three sculptures by Eduardo Chillida arranged as an architectural work by the Basque architect Luis Peña Ganchegui. For both, this is one of their most important and well known works.

The Comb of the Wind is located at the western end of La Concha Bay, at the end of Ondarreta beach, in the municipality of San Sebastián, in the province of Gipuzkoa, in the Basque Country of Spain. It is made up of three of Chillida's monumental steel sculptures, weighing 10 tons each, embedded in natural rocks rising from the Cantabrian Sea.

The work was completed in 1976. In addition to the sculptures, a viewing area was created on the nearby coast that includes "blow-holes", or wave-driven outlets for air and water.

== Gallery ==
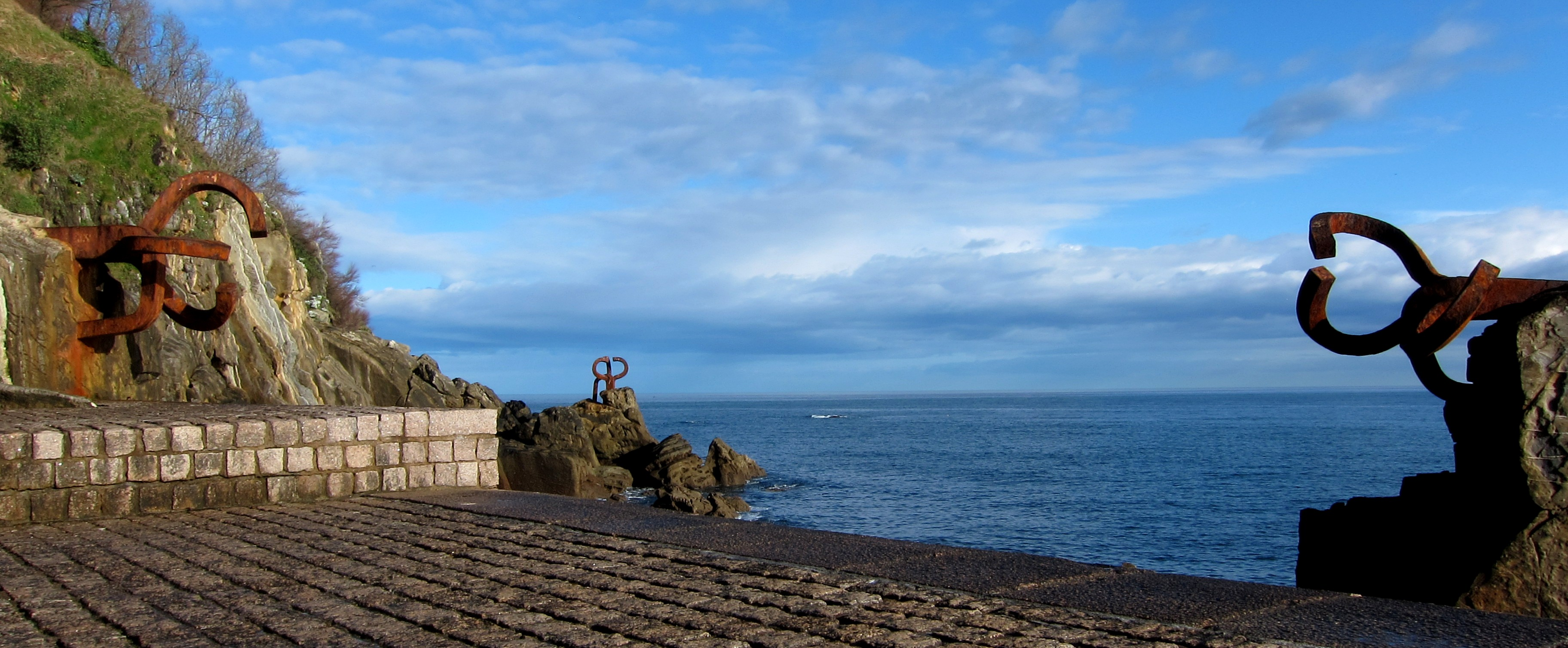

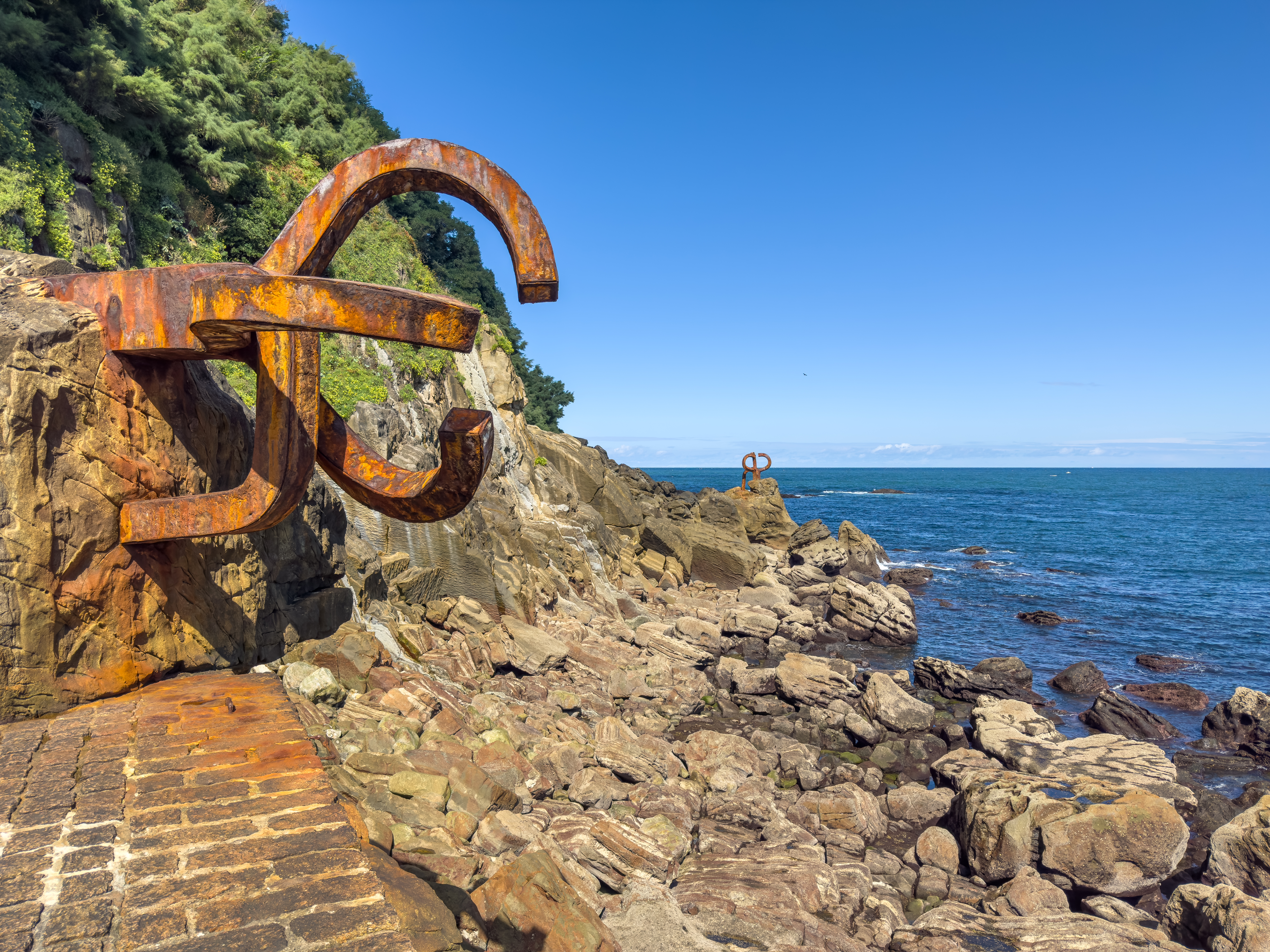

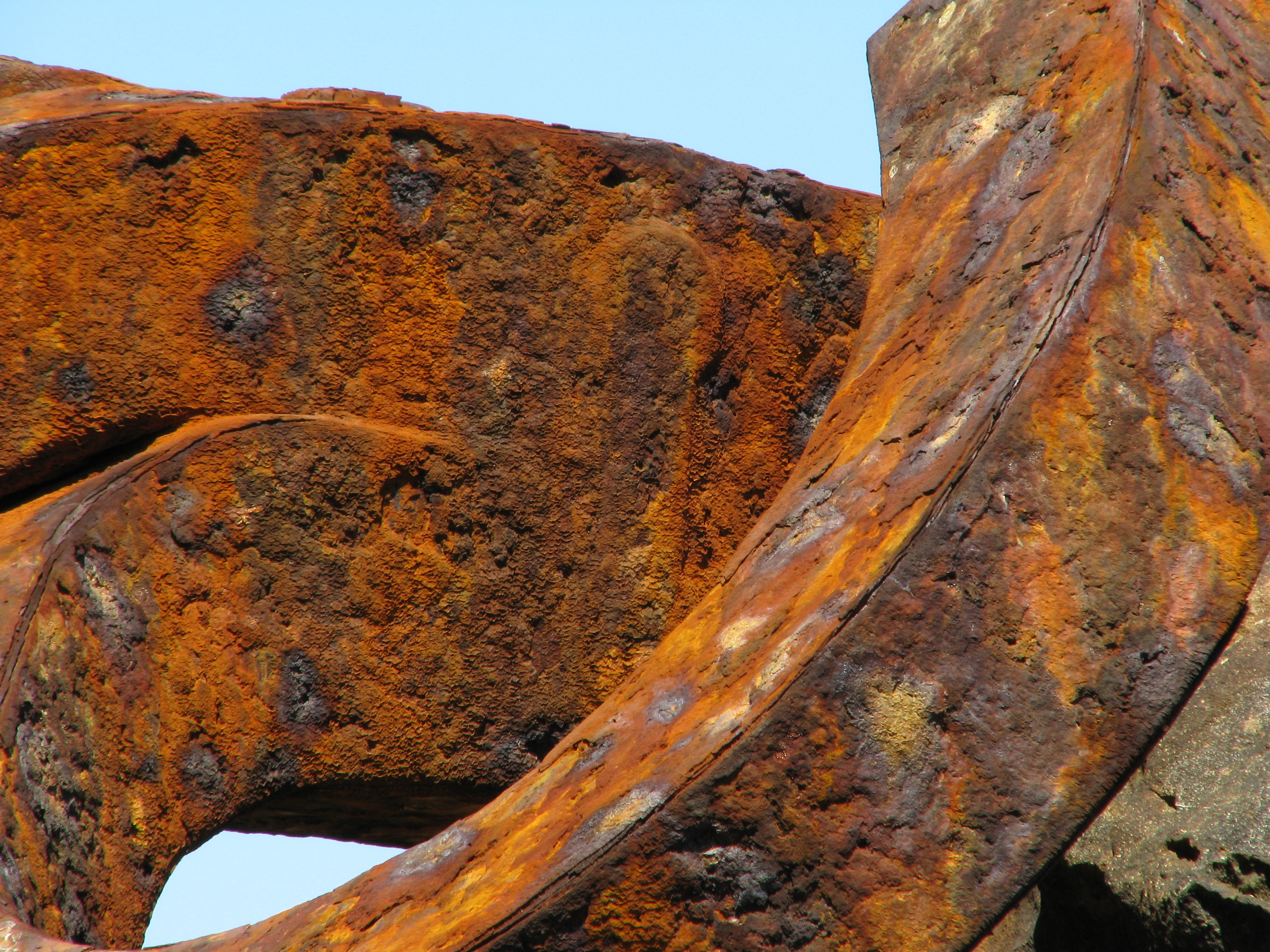

== See also ==
- Blackpool High Tide Organ (2002, in Blackpool, England, UK)
- Sea Organ (2005, in Zadar, Croatia)
