= Tomislav Domazet-Lošo =

Croatian geneticist

Tomislav Domazet-Lošo (born 1974 in Split, Croatia) is a Croatian geneticist. His fields of interest are evolutionary genetics, evolutionary developmental biology, macroevolution, and tumor evolution. He is currently employed at the Ruđer Bošković Institute as a researcher.

== Education ==
Tomislav Domazet-Lošo, son of Croatian Admiral Davor Domazet-Lošo, was born in Split in 1974. In 1997, he graduated with a degree in biology from the Faculty of Science in Zagreb, after which he received his Ph.D. degree in genetics at the University of Cologne, Institute for Genetics in 2003.

== Research ==
Tomislav claimed to have created a method of genomic phylostratigraphy in 2007 in a presentation in the Hall of the Matthias of Croatia. Before this discovery, the only direct approach to the research of evolutionary history was to study and compare the fossil remains discovered at sites all over the world. Since it is impossible to predict where certain fossils are to be found, evolutionary research is largely dependent on good fortune in the discovery of high quality paleontological finds. The theory of genomic phylostratigraphy solved this problem.

Domazet-Lošo and his associates have shown that parts of the organisms that are more exposed to the environment have a higher chance to be affected by environmental evolutionary changes. Furthermore, they managed to show the sequence of so-called embryonic 'leaflets' that are produced in the newly conceived organism in the first days of development, which is the cause of further development of all other tissues. Finally, they discovered a possible genetic cause of the so-called Cambrian explosion, when almost 540 million years ago in a geologically brief period, nearly all existing animal forms suddenly appeared in the fossil record, an event that intrigued even Charles Darwin. However, this method cannot see relatively tiny events like the separation of man and chimpanzee. The widely known scientific work of Dr. Tomislav Domazet-Loš and his associates was premiered in Split at the 5th World Conference on Forensic Genetics and Molecular Anthropology.

Domazet's work can be seen as a proof of the theory of evolution. Although it is assumed that the evolutionary history of the species in 200 years has been mirrored in animal embryonic development, it has not been scientifically confirmed so far. Novelty is in the discovery of statistics-based genomic phylostratigraphy, which is based on statistics and which can measure the overall evolutionary age of active genes during each stage of embryonic development. The genomic phylostratigraphic method is excellent for the reconstruction of the distant evolutionary past, for example, fifty million or one billion years old, which could only be studied solely with the help of fossils. The loin method was experimentally demonstrated three years ago and the research was done on a zebra fish. With the help of genomic phylostratigraphy, it has been shown that approximately in the middle of embryonic development there was a period when all vertebrae were morphologically similar. At this stage, which is called filetypes, differences in the appearance of fish, reptiles, and mammals are almost insignificant.

Genome phylostratigraphy opens up new chapters on research of problems in biology and medicine, and it could be useful in comprehending the research of tumor genetics. Domazet-Loš and his team have shown in research on hydras that even simple organisms may have tumors. It follows that the possibility of tumor development is actually an immanent feature of multicellular organisms.

== Controversy ==
Tomislav was summoned to appear in front of the Ethical board of the Institut Ruđer Bošković to defend his unscientific claims about the Covid-19 and generally mRNA vaccines he publicly expressed. His interpretation of the vaccine was that it was Satanistic, and recommended prayers and confessions as a cure. He refused this claiming the whole process infringes upon his religious rights.
