= Plaza de los Fueros =

Coordinates: 42.8455°N 2.6701°W

Plaza de los Fueros Foru plaza (Basque)
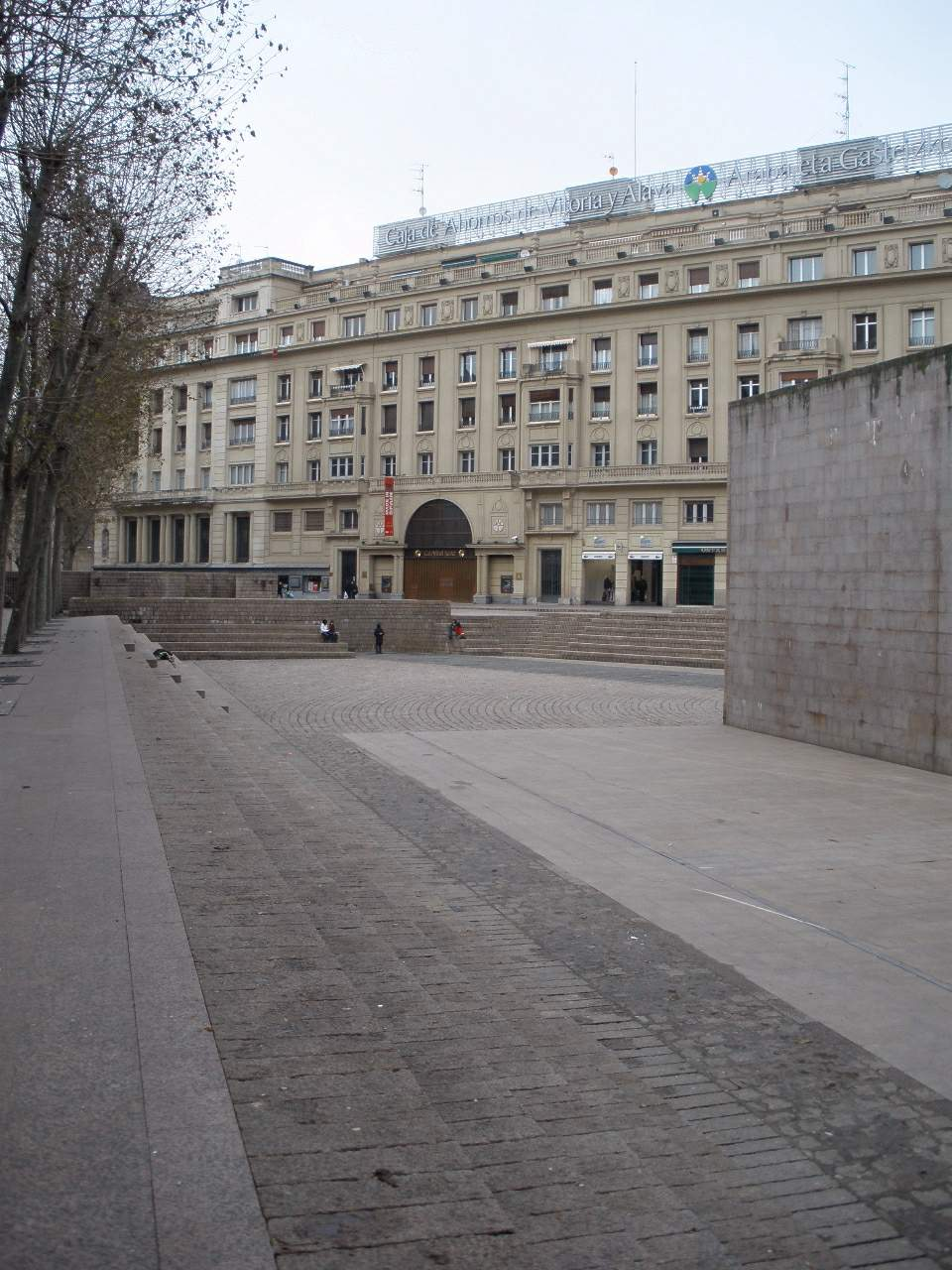
- "Plaza de los Fueros" of Vitoria-Gasteiz
- Interactive map of Plaza de los Fueros

The Plaza de los Fueros (Basque: Foru plaza) is a plaza or square located in the city centre of Vitoria-Gasteiz, which is the capital of the Basque Country, Spain. It was built in 1979 in memory of the county code of laws named fuero in Spanish.

== History ==
The Plaza de los Fueros was built in 1979 by Eduardo Chillida and Luis Peña Ganchegui, replacing the Plaza de Abastos previously located in the same place, a place where all kind of fresh products were sold.

In 1878 an architect proposed a new project to build a public Plaza de Abastos, where all the citizens from Vitoria-Gasteiz could buy fresh food due to the bad condition of the stalls where those products were sold. The city commission of the public work accepted the idea and decided that the plaza would be built in the location where nowadays we can find the Plaza de los Fueros.

Nevertheless, most of the local merchants started to complain against the new square, because of the loss that it would imply for their business. Due to that fact, the project was rejected for several years until 1897, when the mayor of Vitoria at that moment, Vicente González de Echavarri, finally approved the proposal. The city architect, Javier Aguirre, elaborated a project for the plaza which included a square with a big modern building in the centre. The style of the building was avant-garde and modernist, with an iron structure and large windows. The project of the building was presented to the citizens in order to have their opinion. Though they disliked the idea, the city council decided to continue with the project.

Finally, the Plaza de Abastos was finished in 1899, while the new mayor of Vitoria-Gasteiz was Federico Baraibar. That plaza was only there for 76 years, and in January 1975, it was the last time it opened. Although the new project was not correctly seen by most of the citizens, the city council decided to demolish the building in order to construct a different plaza; the Plaza de Abastos was moved to the new Plaza de Santa Bárbara, where it is nowadays located.

After that, in 1976 it was decided that the Plaza de los Fueros would replace the Plaza de los Abastos, and it was finished and opened in 1979. However, the square has suffered many changes since that year, due to the accidents that have occurred since then. There have been changes in order to make the plaza safer, but those changes have not changed the aesthetics of the Plaza de los Fueros.

== Project ==
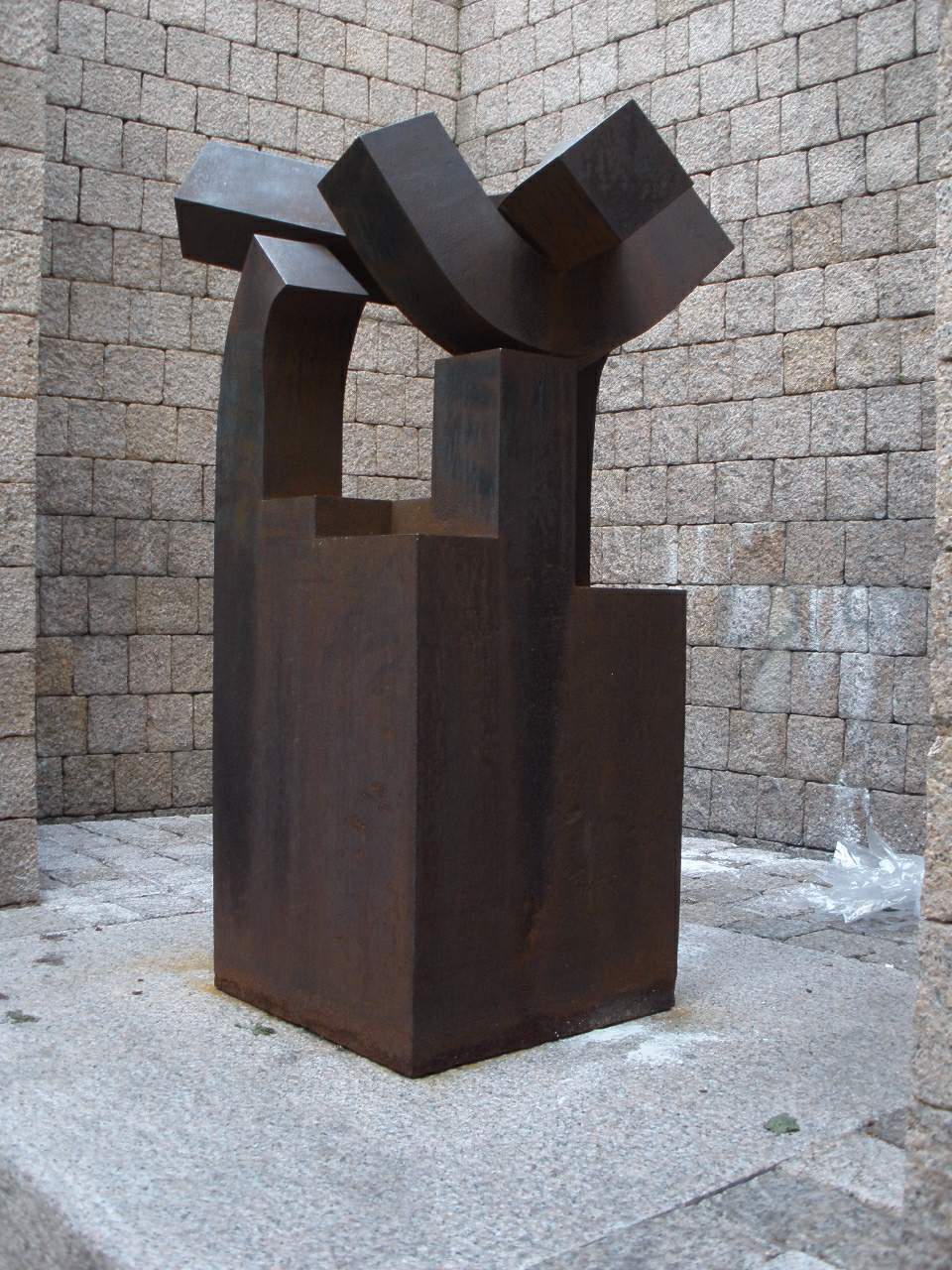
Vitoria - Plaza de los Fueros, estatua de Chillida

The square is a combination of several monuments. Due to it, different figures and shapes can de distinguished, with the typical combinations of materials that Eduardo Chillida used in his works. Since it is an ensemble of many monuments, the plaza is divided in different parts such as a fronton, an undergrown bowling alley, a spacious area in order to be used for different events and some stairs which are located all around the plaza. It also includes a map of the county of Alava, and in the exact location of the Trebiño area a metal sculpture called "homage to the Fueros" is placed. This maps can only be seen from a bird's-eye view.

The Plaza de los Fueros is basically made of pink granite. All the monuments that form this area were designed and built by Eduardo Chillida together with Luis Peña Ganchegui.

== Location ==
The square is located in the city centre of Vitoria-Gasteiz, in a crossing between Fueros, Postas and Independencia streets, together with the Correos square. It is surrounded by important buildings such as those which used to belong to kutxabank, the post office of Vitoria, and several flats. The whole area where it is located is a pedestrian one, where cars without an official permission are not allowed to enter in, and it is usually crowded at any time of the day.

== Uses of the square ==
The Plaza de los Fueros is mostly used during the Virgen Blanca Festivities which take place in August. The plaza is used during those days for many entertainment activities such as concerts. The area is also used for Basque rural sports during the festivities such as The Basque Ball and aizkolaritza.

== See also ==
- Vitoria-Gasteiz
