= Lantern Museum =

Museum in Vitoria-Gasteiz, Spain

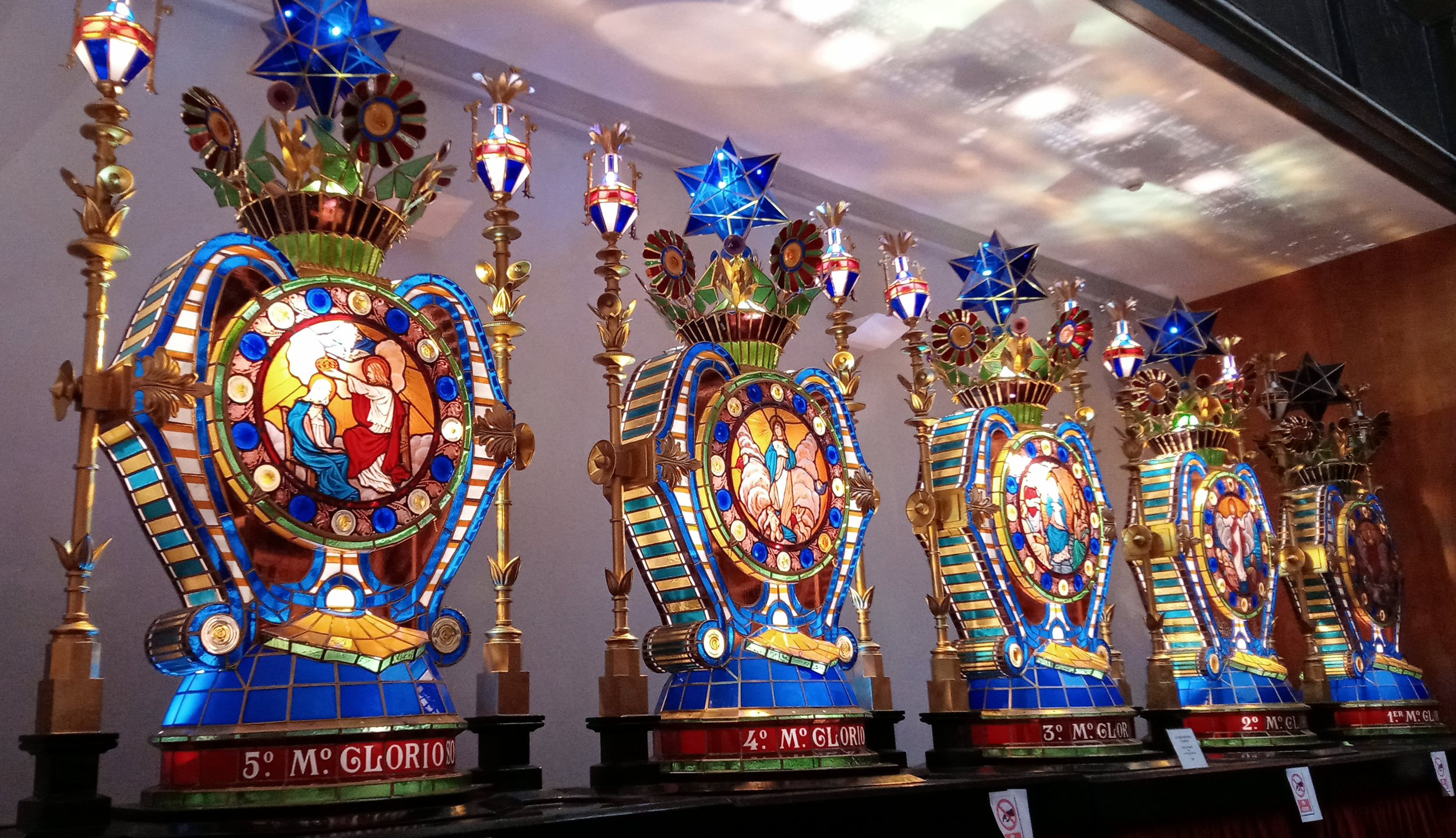
- Lanterns housed in the museum
- Established: 2000
- Location: 33 Zapatería St., Vitoria-Gasteiz, Spain
- Coordinates: 42°50′53″N 2°40′27″W
- Visitors: 28,000 (2018)
- Website: www.cofradiavirgenblanca.com

The Lantern Museum (Basque: Farolen museoa, Spanish: Museo de los Faroles) is located in Vitoria-Gasteiz, Álava, Basque Country, Spain. It houses the lanterns used in the Rosary of the Lanterns procession, celebrated every 4th of August during the Virgen Blanca Festivities.

== History ==
The Rosary procession has been celebrated since the early 17th century, but lanterns weren't introduced until 1895. They were made of metal and glass, with candles being used to light them. The building which houses the lanterns throughout the year was built in 1901, with the support of then mayor Federico Baraibar. It was designed by local architect Fausto Íñiguez de Betolaza.

The building was reformed in 2000, when it opened as a museum. The museum was enlarged in 2014 by joining the existing facilities with an adjacent building.

== Collection ==
As of 2019, the museum housed a total of 273 lanterns. These include a Great Cross representing the Virgen Blanca, two columns of faith, and a lantern for each of the Mysteries of the Rosary (except for the Luminous Mysteries, represented by a single lantern). The prayers of the Rosary are represented by 15 lanterns corresponding to the Lord's Prayer, 150 for the Hail Mary, and 15 for the Gloria Patri. There's also 9 of them representing kyries, 53 litanies, 3 Agnus Dei, a Hail Mary and 5 salutations.

The last lanterns to be added to the collection were built in 2020, but their first procession was delayed until 2022 due to the COVID-19 pandemic. The twelve lanterns represent the prayers of the Rosary.
