= Blusas =

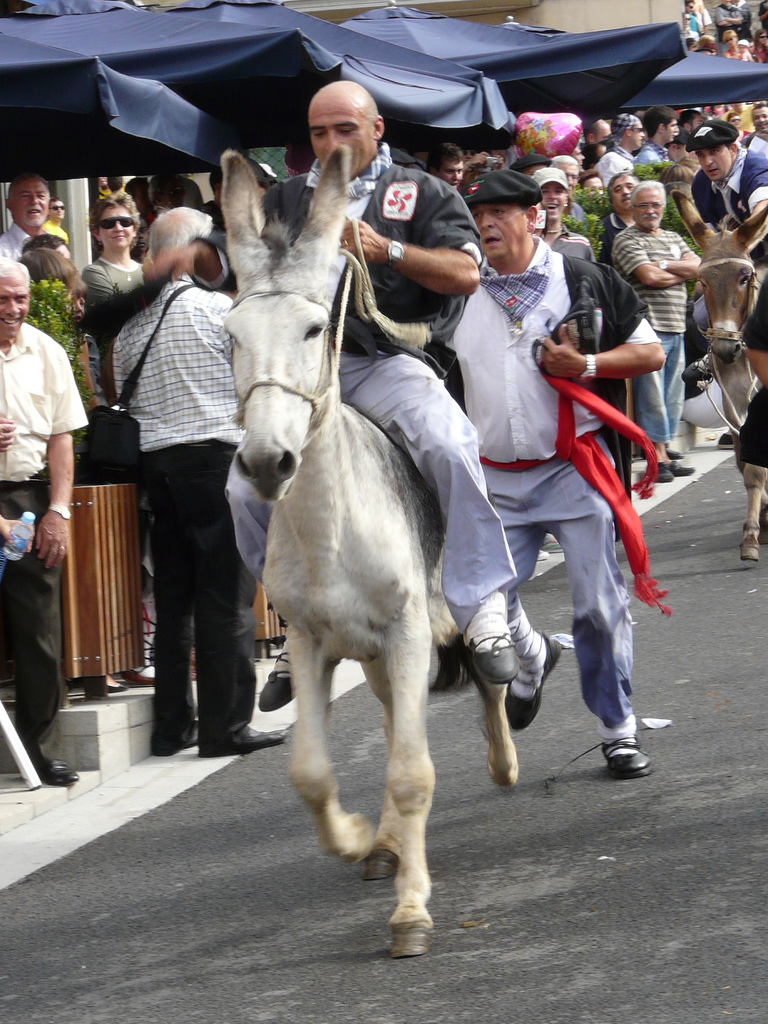
The Blusas parading in the streets of Vitoria-Gasteiz

Blusas are individuals in the autonomous Basque region in Spain who dress in the traditional clothes of the region and attend events in Vitoria-Gasteiz (Basque Country) such as the Virgen Blanca Festivities. The blusas assemble in groups called cuadrillas, and their main role is to provide entertainment at these events.

== Etymology ==
Etymologically, blusas comes from the Basque language and refers to the typical long shirts worn at the festivities.

== History ==
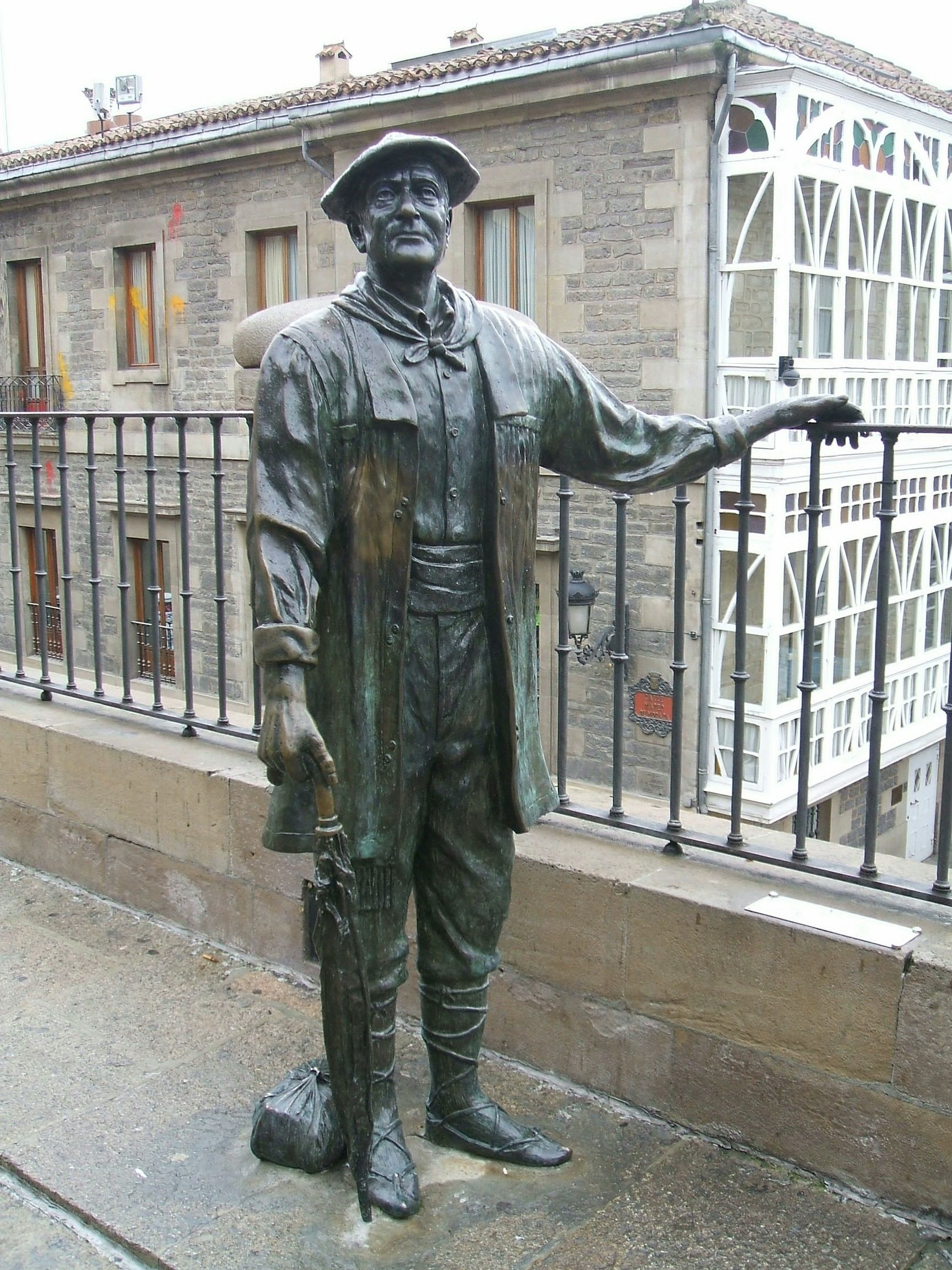
Celedón

The festivities in Vitoria-Gasteiz have a rural origin. It was originally held for attendance at los toros.

== Festival routine ==
Blusas are the main cheerleaders of festivals and thus their routine is connected to it. During the corrida, they gather and parade near the bullring without entering.

== Attire ==
The blusas wear the typical rural attire the Araba natives once wore. The outfit consists of a shirt, a "blusa" (blouse), a pair of trousers and the "albarcas" whereas "neskas" wear a blouse, long skirt and "albarcas".

== See also ==
- Virgen Blanca Festivities
