= Amaia Arrazola =

Spanish Basque illustrator (1984–2025)

Amaia Arrazola Otaduy
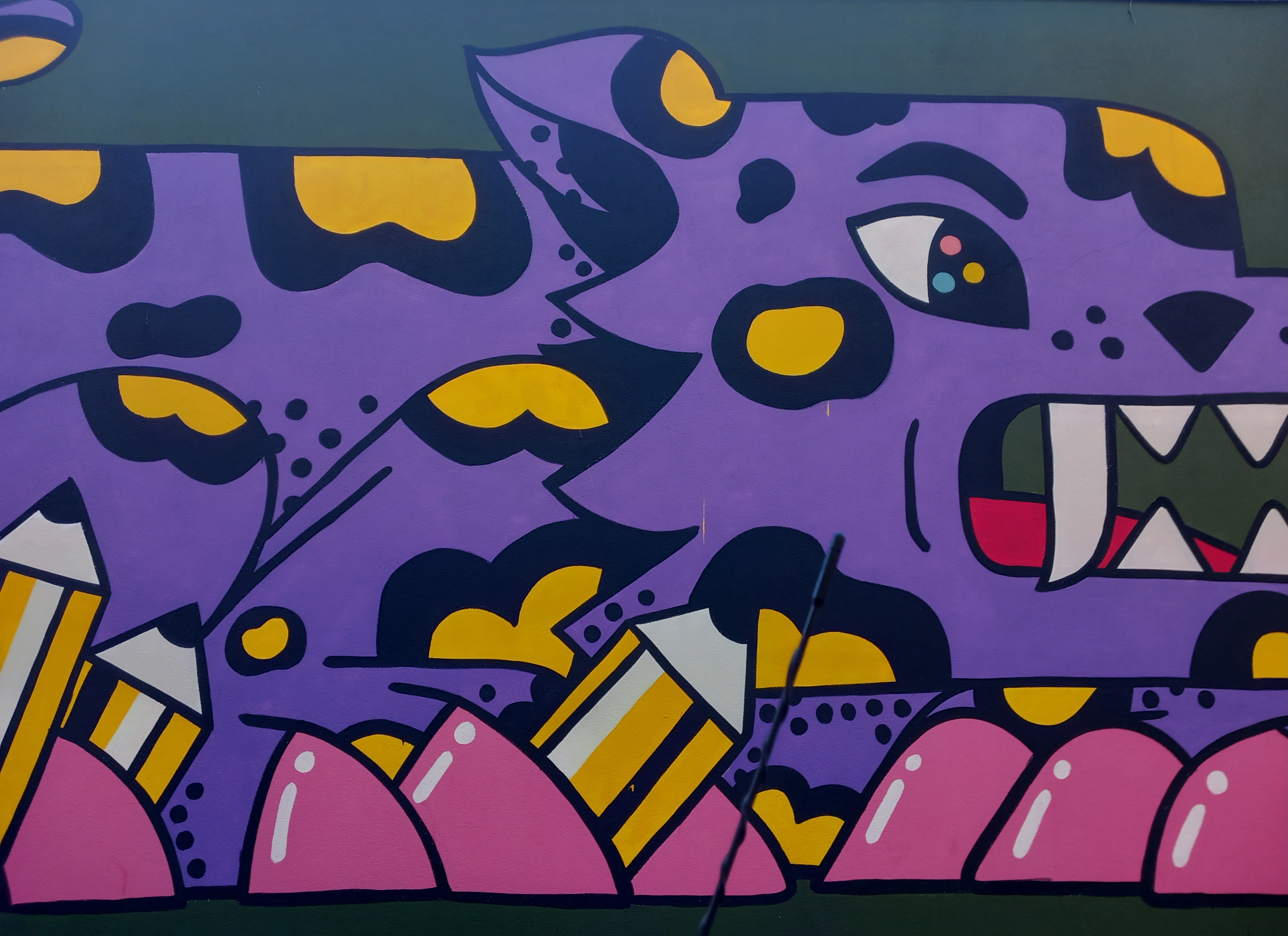
- Mural by Amaia Arrazola
- Born: Amaia Arrazola Otaduy; 18 April 1984; Vitoria-Gasteiz, Spain
- Died: 5 November 2025 (aged 41); Barcelona, Spain
- Occupations: Illustrator, muralist

Amaia Arrazola Otadui (18 April 1984 – 5 November 2025) was a Spanish Basque illustrator and multidisciplinary creator, also described as a muralist.

Arrazola studied Advertising at the Complutense University of Madrid and worked in a Madrid advertising agency as an art director and illustrator. Subsequently, she moved to Barcelona, where she aimed to move away from advertising and focus on illustration. In Barcelona, she also studied design at Elisava. Arrazola worked as a freelance illustrator, collaborating with various brands and institutions, including Uniqlo, Nike, the University of Barcelona, the Barcelona City Council, and the Provincial Council of Biscay. Her work appeared in national and international publications, including magazines and newspapers.

Arrazola died in Barcelona on 5 November 2025, at the age of 41, following a rapid progression of cancer.

== Works ==
Arrazola was the author and illustrator of several books, with the book Wabi Sabi (2018) marking a turning point in her career, as it was the first publication for which she created both the text and the images. Prior to this, she primarily illustrated texts by other authors or external projects. Wabi Sabi was designed during a one-month residency in Matsudo, Japan, at the Paradise Air headquarters, based on illustrations from the Amaia was here project. Her work was executed on a wide range of media, including walls (murals), tobacco packages, plates, surfboards, and tarot cards. In 2021, she participated in the Asalto Festival in Alfamén (Zaragoza province), an art intervention project involving the creation of murals in a rural setting.

Other individual works include:

- El meteorito (2020), which addresses her experience with motherhood.
- Totoro y yo (2022), an illustrated biography of Japanese film director Hayao Miyazaki.

She also provided illustrations for various publications by other authors, such as:

- Corazón robot (2014) by Iñaki Oliver.
- Cosas que nunca olvidarás de tu Erasmus (2014) by Raquel Piñeiro.
- Pequeña y grande: Audrey Hepburn (2015) by Isabel Sánchez Vergara.
- Pequeños grandes gestos en el deporte (2015) by Francisco Llorca.
- En el patio (2015) by Arrate Egaña.
- Sin bragas en el cajón (2015) by Isabel Sánchez Vergara.
- El futuro es femenino (2018) by Sara Cano (with other illustrators).

== Style ==
Arrazola defined her style as "the sum of what you have in your head and what you let your hands do." Her works frequently used black and white, often incorporating a distinct touch of colour. Common elements in her imagery included women, animals (such as birds and unicorns), and flowers, often combining everyday elements with fantasy.

== Awards and recognition ==
- 2023 - Contra el olvido mural, winner of the "Compartiendo Muros" program by the Madrid City Council.
- 2024 - La bajada del Celedón (The Descent of Celedón) poster, winner of the poster competition for the La Blanca festivities in Vitoria-Gasteiz.
