= Montaña de Tindaya =

Mountain in Fuerteventura, Canary Islands, Spain

Tindaya
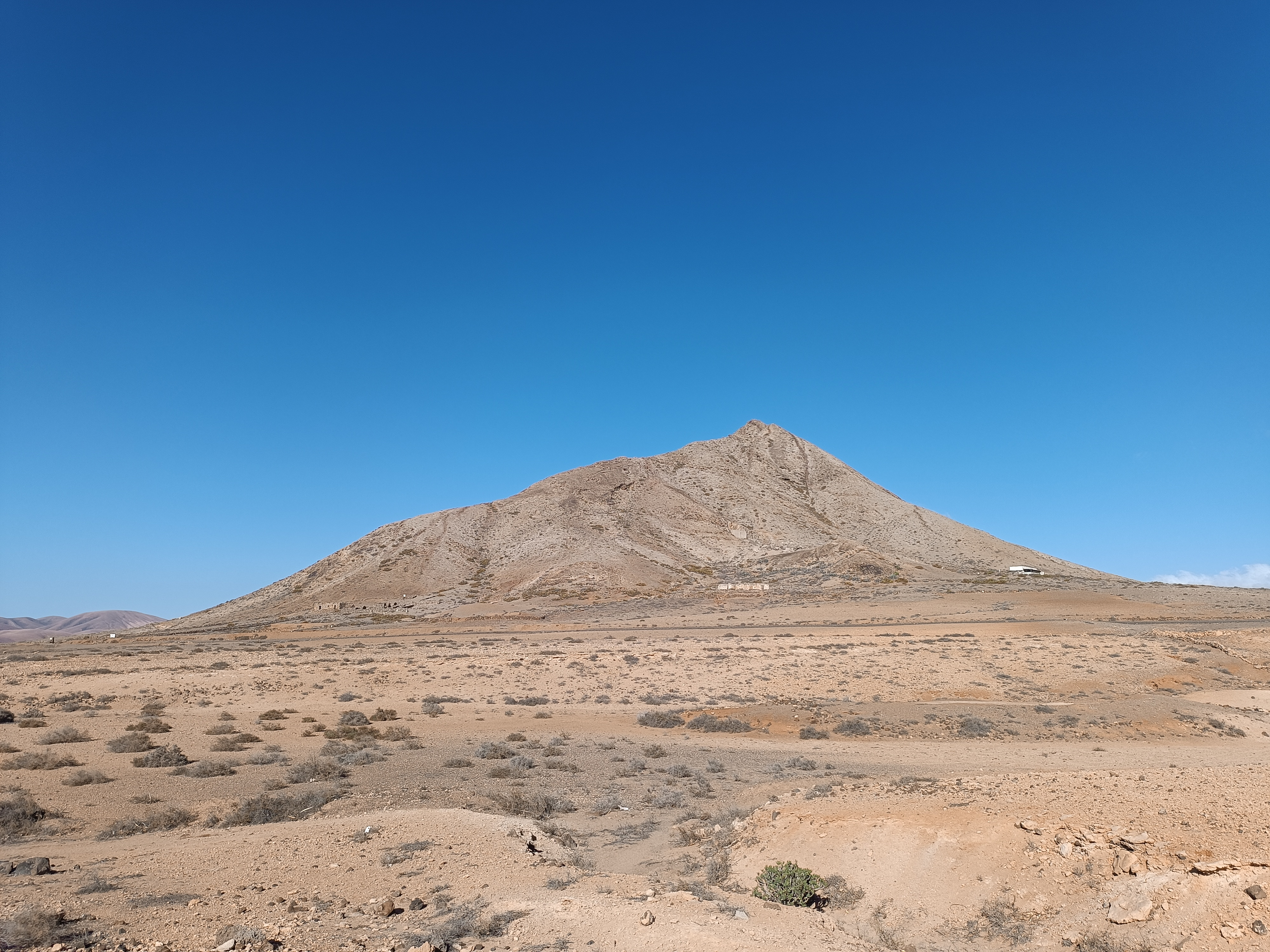
- Montaña de Tindaya as seen near the village.

Highest point
- Elevation: 401 m (1,316 ft)
- Coordinates: 28.5964°N 13.9764°W

Geography
- Location: Fuerteventura

The Montaña de Tindaya is a mountain in Fuerteventura, one of the Canary Islands in the Atlantic Ocean off the coast of Africa. It was considered a sacred place by the pre-colonial local population, and is also known as the Sacred Mountain (Spanish: Montaña Sagrada) today.

The mountain is the proposed site of Monument to Tolerance, an artwork conceived by the sculptor Eduardo Chillida (1924–2002), that would involve the excavation a large artificial cave. Local environmentalists objected to the project. As of 2019, construction work on the site had not started.
