= Celedón =

Character central to the Virgen Blanca Festivities

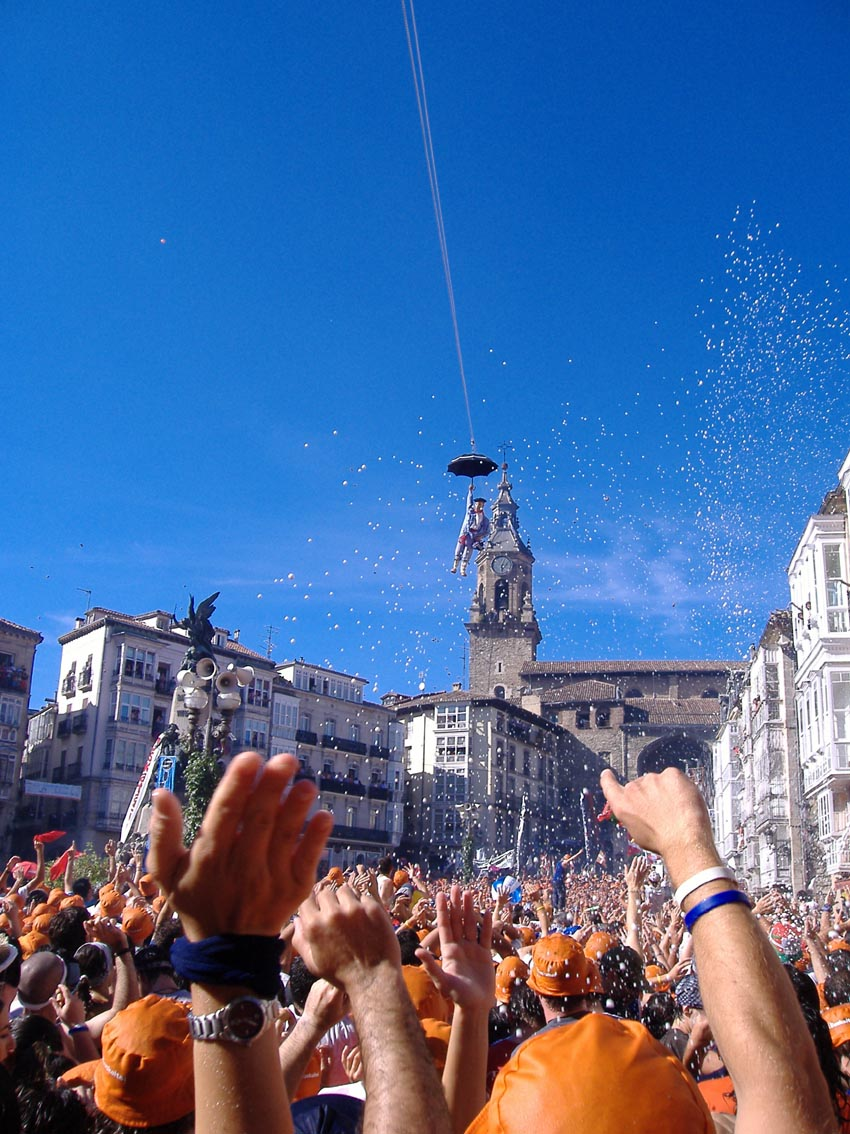
The popular descent of Celedón.

Celedón (Spanish pronunciation: [θeleˈðon], Basque: Zeledon [s̻eleðon]) is a fictional character central to the Virgen Blanca Festivities of Vitoria-Gasteiz, in the Basque province of Álava in Spain. He is portrayed wearing a beret and dressed in a traditional blouse, always carrying an umbrella.

== History ==
Celedón's descent was invented in 1957 by a group of Vitorians. They created the descent of Celedón, a metaphor for the peasants of the province traveling to the city to celebrate the holidays.

Tradition affirms that he was born in Zalduondo, a small village of Álava, which today produces wine. They say that he was called Juan Celedonio de Anzola. Other investigators argue that Celedón was a brigadier of the Carlist army born in Andagoya, named Celedón Aguiluz. Since the personage of Celedón was created in 1957, five people have embodied the legend: Jose Luis Isasi, who held the title for 22 years, Enrique Oribe, who substituted in 1976, Iñaki Landa, who personified the villager of Zalduondo from 1980 until 2000, Gorka Ortiz de Urbina from 2001 until 2023, and Iñaki Kerejazu since 2024.

== Celedonio Alzola ==
In hindsight, Celedón's "flight" known by the people who live in Vitoria-Gasteiz, remains the passion for the Virgen Blanca Festivities of a villager of Zalduondo at the end of the 18th century. He was called Celedonio Alzola and apparently, was proclaimed as a protagonist of the holidays as soon as he got to Vitoria. He used to invite everyone to go with him and together enjoy the celebrations and the holidays of the city. It is also believed that Celedonio lived in a street called "The Shoe Store Street" between 1796 and 1866 and was a very famous bricklayer who frequented the bars with his friends.

In 1957, a group of blouses designed the descent of a doll from the belfry of the Church of San Miguel up to the New Square to give the beginning of the holidays of the Virgen Blanca. The first descent failed, so they decided to get a person to solve the problem and the idea was a success. The person who appeared was Jose Luis Isasi, at the town hall of Vitoria. Since then only four people have been chosen by the squads of blouses and neskas who have personified Celedón or the villager of Zalduondo.

== 50th anniversary of the descent of the Celedón ==
2007 was the 50th anniversary of the descent of Celedón, which went down for the first time in the year 1957. In his first descent, the rope broke, although this fact did not prevent Isasi from going out to the balcony and giving the beginning to the holidays. On the 50th anniversary, Gorka Ortiz de Urbina and Iñaki Landa made an emotive opening procession together, and on the balcony, they resembled Isasi, who was away because of a serious disease.

Nowadays in the "balconada" of San Miguel, it is possible to see Celedón's sculpture; this sculpture takes the face of Jose Luis Isasi Moltalbán, the first Celedón and one of the creators of Celedón's figure.
