= Elogio del Horizonte =

Concrete sculpture in Gijón, Spain

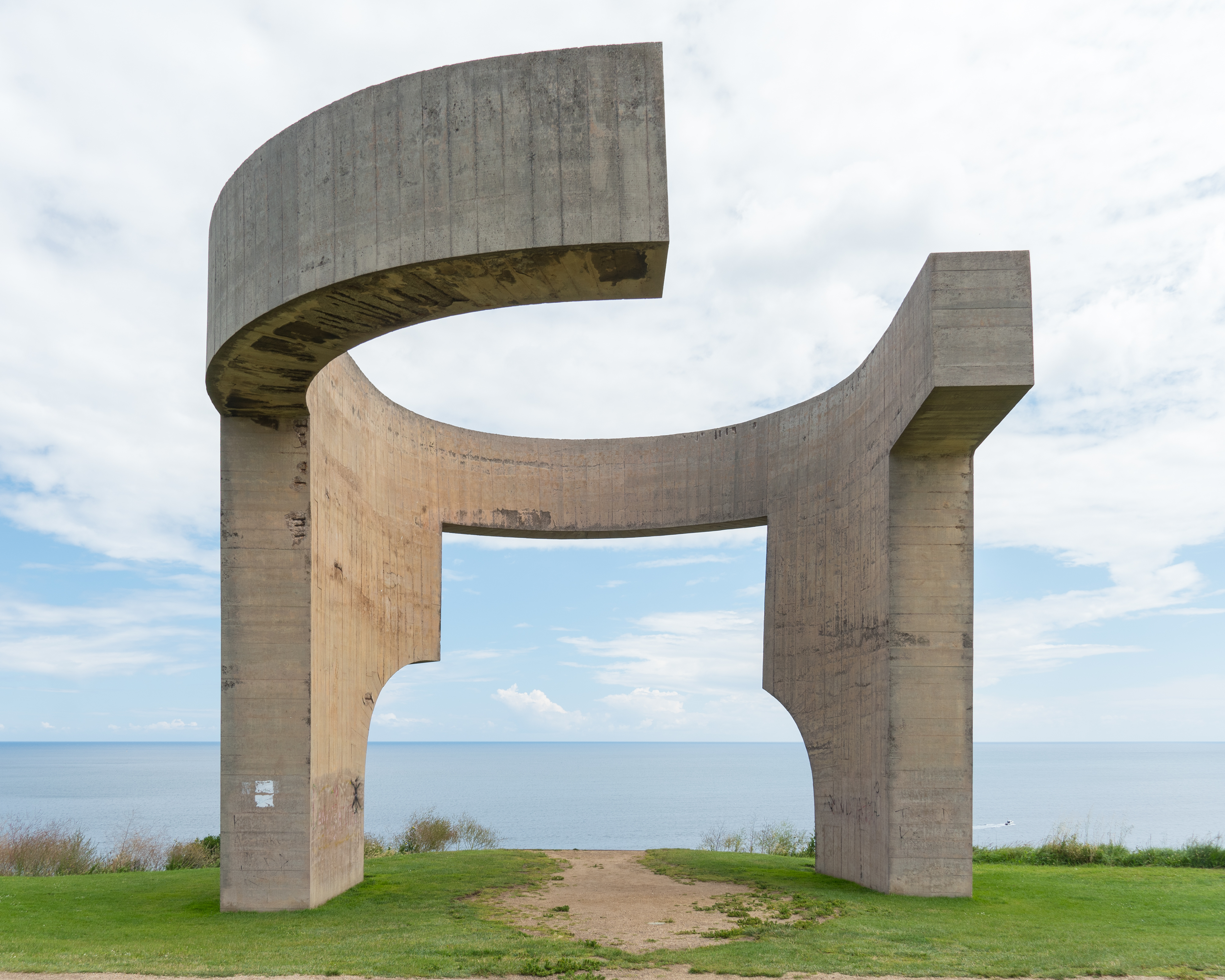
- Artist: Eduardo Chillida
- Completion date: 30 October 1989
- Medium: Concrete
- Dimensions: 10 m × 12 m × 15.5 m (33 ft × 39 ft × 51 ft)
- Location: Gijón, Spain
- 43°32′57″N 5°39′47″W

Elogio del Horizonte (transl. Eulogy of the Horizon) is a concrete sculpture located on the cliffsides of Gijón, Spain, overlooking the Cantabrian Sea. It stands 10 metres (33 ft) tall and weighs 500 tonnes (550 short tons). Designed by Basque sculptor Eduardo Chillida and inaugurated in 1990, it has been described as a "symbol" of Gijón. Conversely, it has also received criticism for its elevated construction costs and unusual shape.

== Description ==
Elogio del Horizonte is a concrete sculpture measuring 10 m (33 ft) tall, 15.5 m (51 ft) long, and 12.5 m (41 ft) wide, and weighing 500 tonnes (550 short tons). It stands on the cliffsides of Gijón, overlooking the Cantabrian Sea. With the sculpture, designer Eduardo Chillida intended to pay tribute to the horizon, which he described as the "homeland of every man".

== History ==
The designer of Elogio del Horizonte, Basque sculptor Eduardo Chillida, came up with the idea for the statue and began seeking an oceanside location for it in 1985. His search ended in 1986 when the city government of Gijón offered him a spot on the city's coast on the Cerro de Santa Catalina, overlooking the Cantabrian Sea. The city planned to convert the site from a restricted military zone to a public park, and sought a sculpture to stand as the highlight of the new area.

After visiting the area in October 1987, Chillida confirmed it as the site of the future sculpture. Sculptor Jesús Aledo made an initial full-scale model of the statue using polymeric foam; this became the basis for the pine formwork which served as the sculpture's foundation. Carpenters used 14,000 kilograms of numbered planks for the formwork in order to map the complex curves of the Elogio. Concrete pouring began in the autumn of 1989; civil engineer José Antonio Fernández Ordóñez used more than twenty different concrete mixes in order to perfect the sculpture's color. Work finished on 30 October 1989.

Elogio del Horizonte was inaugurated on 9 June 1990. It quickly received criticism for its inflated cost of 100,000,000 pesetas. It was also derisively nicknamed "King Kong's toilet" due to its unusual shape. Conversely, later on in its lifetime, the sculpture has started to be described as a "symbol of the city". An €80,000 restoration of the sculpture was planned for 2024, 34 years after its inauguration.
