= Luis Peña Ganchegui =

Spanish architect (1926–2009)

- Born: 29 March 1926; Oñati, Spain
- Died: 2 April 2009 (aged 83); San Sebastián, Spain
- Occupation: Architect

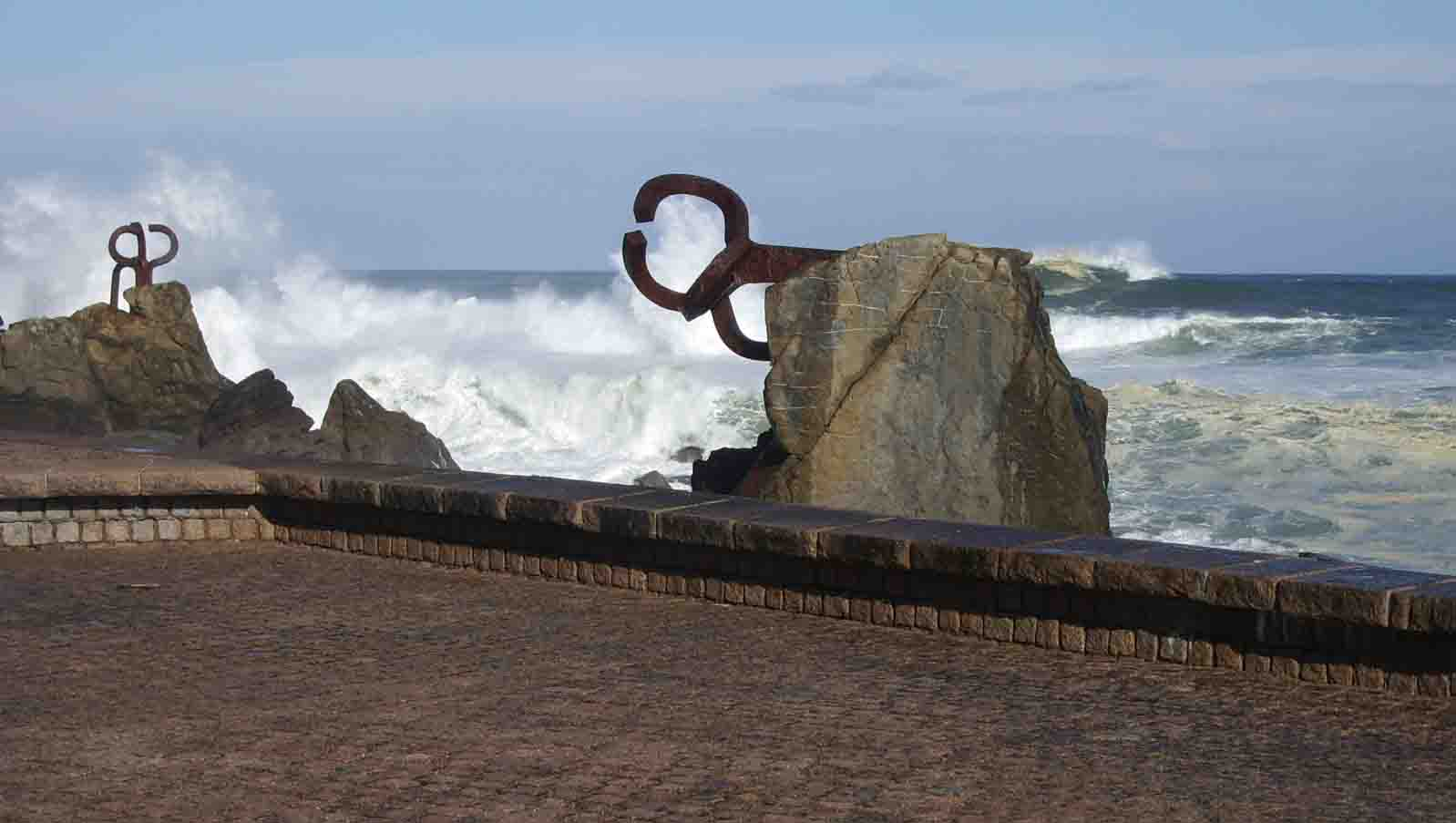
Donostia Haize Orrazia Txillida Peña.jpg

Luis Peña Ganchegui (29 March 1926 in Oñati, Gipuzkoa – 2 April 2009 in San Sebastián) was a Spanish architect. He is considered one of the first to introduce contemporary architecture to Spain.

== Biography ==
He studied architecture at the Superior Technical School of Architecture of Madrid, graduating in 1959. He began teaching in the same year, first in Barcelona and then in San Sebastian, where he was professor beginning in 1982 and deputy director starting in 1983.

== Political activity ==
In 1956, Luis Peña became associated with the University Socialist Group (Spanish Wikipedia link) which was led in those years by Víctor Pradera, among others. He was detained for related activities in Pamplona in mid-March 1956, as part of a group that included Juan Benet and Luis Martín-Santos.

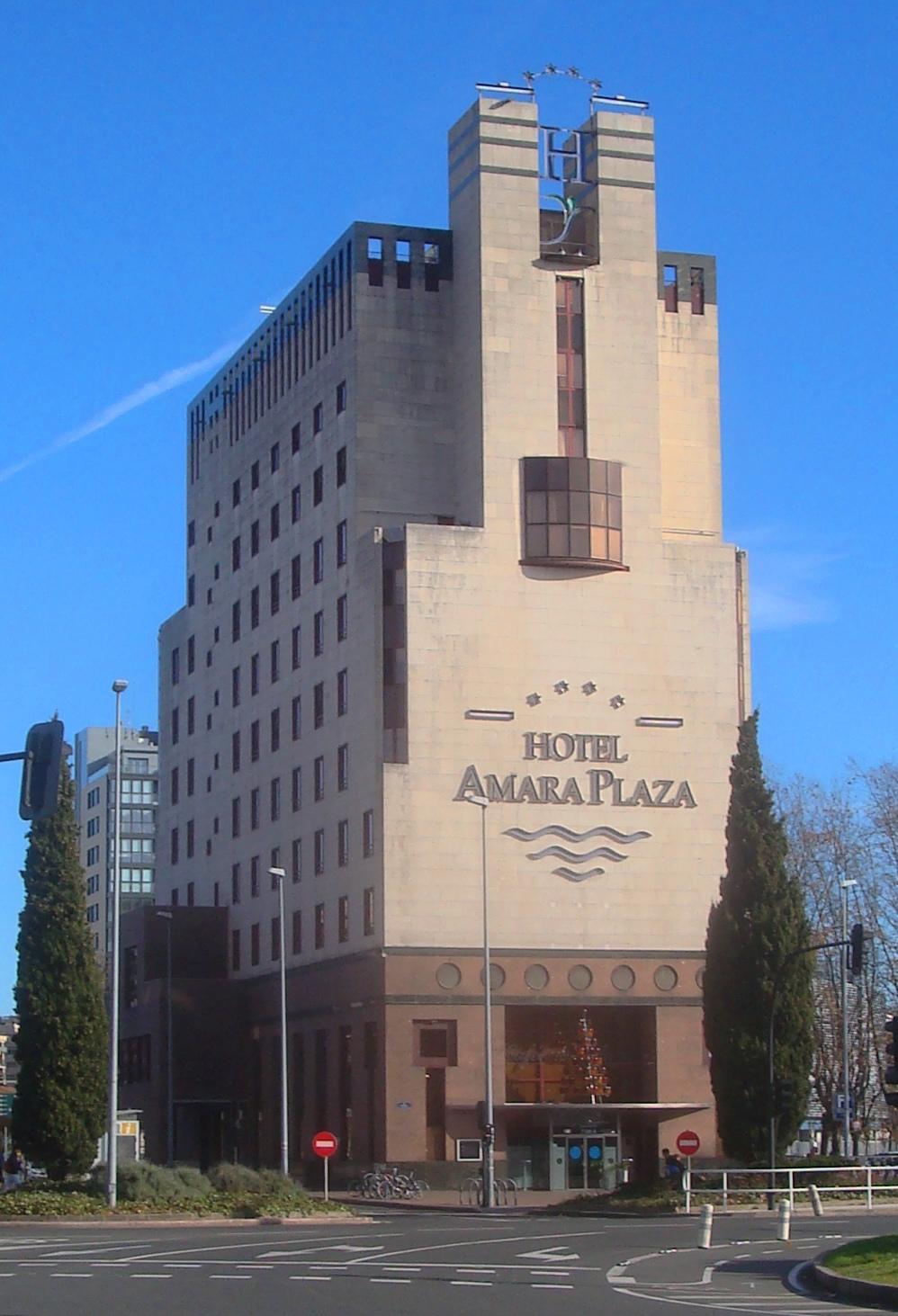
Amara Plaza Hotel

== Career ==
Of his numerous projects, many of the most notable are in the Basque country. His best-known work is the Comb of the Wind, a collaboration with Eduardo Chillida. The two also collaborated on the Plaza de los Fueros in Vitoria. The Hotel Amara Plaza, in San Sebastián was designed by Luis Peña Ganchegi. One of his last works was the reform of the Square of Pasai San Juan.

== Awards ==
1999: Antonio Camuñas Prize for Architecture, awarded for his professional career.

2004: Gold Medal of Architecture, granted by the Superior Council of the Colleges of Architects of Spain.

2007: COAVN Architecture Award for Best Urban Design and Landscaping.
