= Virgen Blanca =

Patron saint of Vitoria-Gasteiz, Spain

The Virgen Blanca (Basque: Andre Maria Zuria, English: White Virgin) is the patron saint of the Spanish city Vitoria-Gasteiz (a city in the north east part of Spain, capital of the Basque Autonomous Community). Its festivity is celebrated on 5 August, commonly known as Andre Maria Zuriaren jaiak or las fiestas de la Blanca.

== History ==
The history of the White Virgin begins with the creation of the city by King Sancho VI of Navarre in 1181. In the 17th century the Virgen Blanca brotherhood was created in order to promote the devotion of the city's patron saint. In 1921 it officially became patron saint of the city and in 1954 it was crowned as the city's "queen".

=== The figure ===
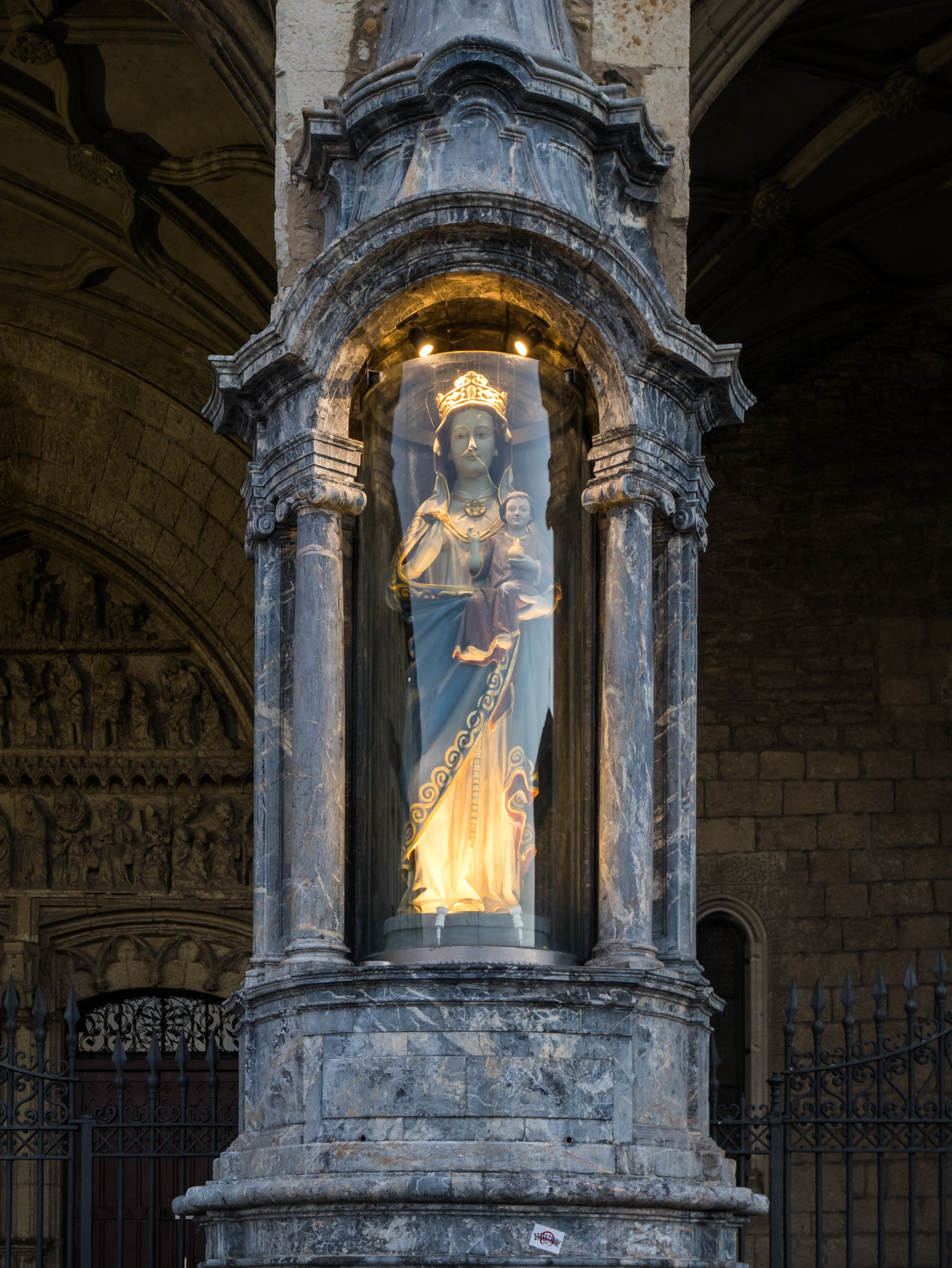
The copy of the figure in the frontal wall of San Miguel's church

The figure that it is located in San Miguel's Church in Virgen Blanca Square. San Miguel's Church is one of four churches from the Middle Ages in Vitoria. The figure was made by Alejandro Valdivieso in 1854. In 2008, a copy of it was made in order to protect the figure from the weather and from vandalism.

== Fiestas De La Blanca ==
The Andre Maria Zuriaren Jaiak/Fiestas de la Virgen Blanca have been celebrated every year, since 1884. It is held on 5 August, but the celebrations begin the day before, on the 4th, and end on 9 August it honours the patron saint of the city, and features a programme of special events, activities and free open-air concerts. Festivities begin at six o'clock in the afternoon with the txupinazo and Celedon's (a rag doll with an umbrella) descent. Once Celedón reaches a balcony in the square, it is replaced by a human Celedón who then crosses the square on foot with some difficulty amongst the crowds. On arriving to the balcony of the Church of San Miguel, Celedón greets the crowds below and wishes everyone a happy celebration. On the morning of 5 August, the Blusas and the Neskak offer flowers to the Virgen Blanca. On 7 August the Children's Day is celebrated. The little Celedón or Celedón txiki descends in the same square as the first day, and later, Celedón txiki and neska txiki wish a happy celebration to all the children in Vitoria, from the Town Hall. On 10 August at one o'clock in the morning Celedon ascends and this marks the end of the Virgen Blanca Festivities.

== The Brotherhood of Nuestra Señora De La Virgen Blanca ==
It is said that the brotherhood was created in the 15th century, but according to its own chronicles it was officially created in the 17th century by a group of candle markers in order to protect The White Virgin and their own interests. After that other brotherhoods were created to protect and cult the patron saint of the city. In 1927 after the official become of the Virgin in patron saint all the brotherhoods were joined in one.

== Other Virgen Blancas in Spain ==
1. Burgos
2. Consuegra
3. León
4. Castro Urdiales
5. Málaga
6. Sevilla
7. Soria
8. Toledo
9. Tudela
10. Zaragoza
11. Cerceda
12. Jaén
13. Lleida
