= Federico Baraibar =

Spanish politician and academic

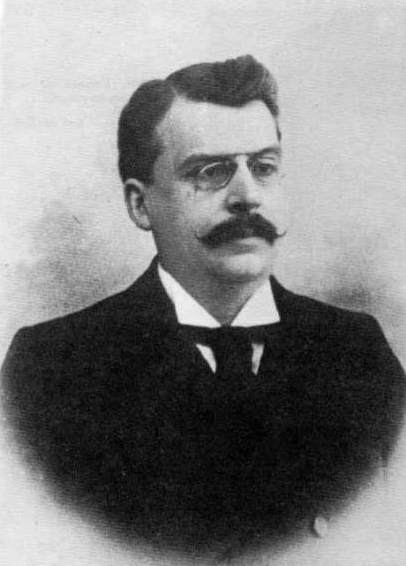
- Baraibar in an undated photo

President of the Deputation of Álava
- In office 1909–1913
- Preceded by: Eduardo Velasco
- Succeeded by: Benito Yera

Mayor of Vitoria
- In office 1897–1903

Personal details
- Born: Federico Baraibar y Zumárraga; 28 May 1851 Vitoria, Spain
- Died: 25 February 1918 (aged 66) Vitoria, Spain
- Education: University of Zaragoza

Federico Baraibar y Zumárraga (28 May 1851 – 25 February 1918) was a Spanish academic and politician. He translated several Greek classics into Spanish and laid the foundations for modern archaeology in the province of Álava. As a politician, he served as the first 20th-century mayor of Vitoria and as President of the Deputation of Álava.

== Biography ==
Federico Baraibar was born in Vitoria in 1851. He spent most of his youth in other cities of Northern Spain such as Logroño and Burgos, but graduated from highschool in Vitoria. In 1870 he obtained a degree in law from the University of Zaragoza. He then returned to Vitoria, and in 1871 obtained a degree in philosophy and philology from the local Literary University. He served as an interim professor in that university until its closure in October 1873.

Upon his return to Vitoria, he became a prominent member of the city's cultural circles, giving conferences and promoting the local cultural heritage. In 1876, he became professor of Spanish and Latin in the local highschool, succeeding Julián Apraiz Sáenz del Burgo (father of architect Julián Apraiz). He also served as director of the highschool from 1909 until his death. He authored a grammar of Latin, and translated numerous works from Ancient Greek into Spanish. As a philologist, he compiled several word lists documenting the dialectal vocabulary used in Álava. He was a candidate for membership in Euskaltzaindia (the Basque language academy), but died before becoming a member.

As an amateur archaeologist, he made important contributions to the field in the province of Álava. He was the first to excavate the Sorginetxe dolmen in 1879, which he bought and donated in 1913 to the Deputation to avoid its dismantling.

As a politician, he served as mayor of Vitoria from 1897 to 1903 and as President of the Deputation from 1909 to 1913, with support from the conservatives. During his time as mayor, he promoted several construction projects in the city. These included a new marketplace which opened on 31 December 1899, and a permanent building for the Lantern Museum.
