= Andagoya =

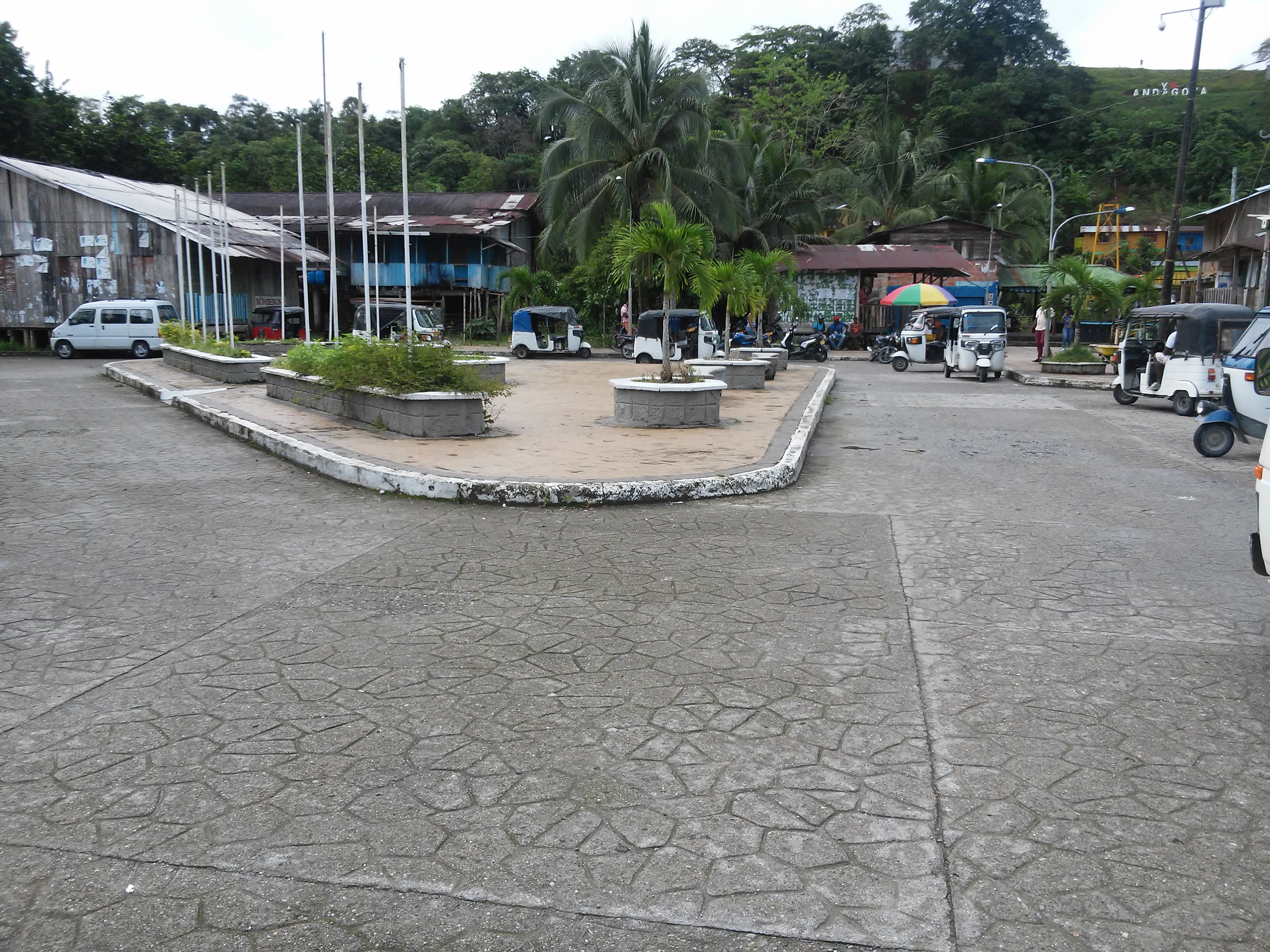
- Main street in Andagoya

- Location in Chocó and Colombia Andagoya (Colombia)
- Coordinates: 5°5′51.8″N 76°41′47.1″W
- Country: Colombia
- Department: Chocó
- Municipality: Medio San Juan
- Elevation: 115 ft (35 m)

Population (2005)
  - Total: 4,233
- Time zone: UTC-5 (Colombia Standard Time)

Andagoya is a village in west-central Colombia. Andagoya is named for Pascual de Andagoya (1495–1548), a Spanish conquistador.

== History ==
A cacique named Pocorosa lived in Andagoya in the 19th century. Pocorosa met the Spanish conquistadors.

== Climate ==
Andagoya has one of the most monotonous climates in the world. Its annual range of mean monthly temperatures – that is to say, the difference between the warmest and coldest months – at Andagoya is mere 0.8C (1.5F) as March, the warmest month, has an average temperature of 26.8 °C (80.2 °F) while November, the "coldest" month, averages 26.0 °C (78.8 °F); the average annual temperature is 26.5 °C (79.7 °F). This near complete uniformity of temperature is caused by the fact that Andagoya, at a latitude of 5°5' North, lies extremely close to the thermal equator, which is situated a few degrees north of the astronomical equator because the Earth reaches perihelion (its closest position to the Sun in its orbit) in early January and is at aphelion (furthest away) in early July, causing places located precisely at the equator to receive somewhat more insolation (i.e., light and heat energy from the sun) in January than in July even though the height of the sun and the length of days would be the same at both times. At a few degrees north latitude, however, the perihelion/aphelion factor and the slightly higher sun and longer days experienced at the time of the summer solstice for the Northern Hemisphere cancel each other out, making the level of insolation experienced there virtually identical throughout the year.

Every month of the year has at least 549 millimetres (21.6 inches) of average precipitation, with the wettest month (May) averaging 726.6 millimetres (28.61 inches). Average annual precipitation is 7,089 millimetres (279.1 inches), and more rain falls at night than during the day, the reverse of what is true in most places that have tropical rainforest climate.

Climate data for Andagoya
Month	Jan	Feb	Mar	Apr	May	Jun	Jul	Aug	Sep	Oct	Nov	Dec	Year
Mean daily maximum °C (°F)	30.6 (87.1)	30.4 (86.7)	31.1 (88.0)	30.9 (87.6)	31.1 (88.0)	30.8 (87.4)	31.2 (88.2)	31.0 (87.8)	30.8 (87.4)	30.3 (86.5)	29.9 (85.8)	30.1 (86.2)	30.7 (87.2)
Daily mean °C (°F)	26.4 (79.5)	26.3 (79.3)	26.8 (80.2)	26.7 (80.1)	26.7 (80.1)	26.5 (79.7)	26.7 (80.1)	26.6 (79.9)	26.5 (79.7)	26.1 (79.0)	26.0 (78.8)	26.1 (79.0)	26.5 (79.6)
Mean daily minimum °C (°F)	22.3 (72.1)	22.2 (72.0)	22.5 (72.5)	22.5 (72.5)	22.4 (72.3)	22.2 (72.0)	22.3 (72.1)	22.2 (72.0)	22.2 (72.0)	22.0 (71.6)	22.1 (71.8)	22.2 (72.0)	22.3 (72.1)
Average rainfall mm (inches)	590.2 (23.24)	583.9 (22.99)	592.0 (23.31)	606.4 (23.87)	726.6 (28.61)	585.0 (23.03)	617.3 (24.30)	685.8 (27.00)	641.9 (25.27)	644.6 (25.38)	549.0 (21.61)	582.9 (22.95)	7,405.6 (291.56)
Average rainy days	23	20	21	22	24	23	24	24	23	24	23	22	273
Source 1:
Source 2:
