= Eduardo Chillida =

Spanish Basque sculptor (1924–2002)

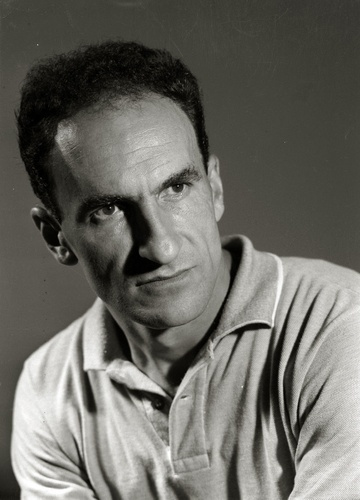
- Eduardo Chillida
- Born: Eduardo Chillida Juantegui; 10 January 1924; San Sebastián, Spain
- Died: 19 August 2002 (aged 78); Donostia-San Sebastian, Basque Country, Spain
- Occupation: Sculptor

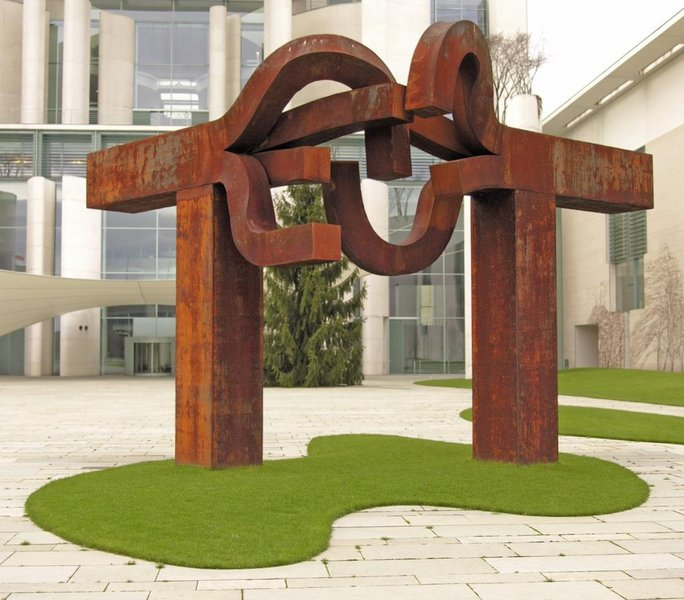
Chillida's sculpture Berlin (2000) for the Office of the Federal Chancellor (Bundeskanzleramt) in Berlin

Eduardo Chillida Juantegui (Basque: Eduardo Txillida Juantegi; 10 January 1924 – 19 August 2002) was a Spanish Basque sculptor notable for his abstract works.

== Early life and career ==
Born in San Sebastián (Donostia) to Pedro Chillida and the soprano Carmen Juantegui on 10 January 1924. Eduardo Chillida grew up near hotel Biarritz, which was owned by his grandparents. Chillida had been the goalkeeper for Real Sociedad, San Sebastián's La Liga football team, where his knee was so seriously injured that he had five surgeries, ending a promising football career. He then studied architecture at the University of Madrid from 1943 to 1946. In 1947 he abandoned architecture for art, and the next year he moved to Paris, where he set up his first studio and began working in plaster and clay. He never finished his degree and instead began to take private art lessons. He lived in Paris from 1948 to 50 and at Villaines-sous-Bois (Seine-et-Oise) from 1950 to 1955. In 1950 Chillida married Pilar Belzunce and later returned to the San Sebastián area, first to the nearby village of Hernani and in 1959 to the city of his birth, where he remained.

He died at his home near San Sebastián at the age of 78.

== Work ==
Chillida's sculptures concentrated on the human form (mostly torsos and busts); his later works tended to be more massive and more abstract, and included many monumental public works. Chillida himself tended to reject the label of "abstract", preferring instead to call himself a "realist sculptor". Upon returning to the Basque Country in 1951, Chillida soon abandoned the plaster he used in his Paris works – a medium suited to his study of archaic figurative works in the Louvre. Living near Hernani, he began to work in forged iron with the help of the local blacksmith, and soon set up a forge in his studio. From 1954 until 1966, Chillida worked on a series entitled Anvil of Dreams, in which he used wood for the first time as a base from which the metal forms rise up in explosive rhythmic curves. He began to make sculpture in alabaster 1965. Rather than turn over a maquette of a sculpture to fabricators, as many modern artists do, Chillida worked closely with the men in the foundry. He then usually added an alloy that caused the metal to take on a brilliant rust color as it oxidizes.

From quite early on, Chillida's sculpture found public recognition, and, in 1954, he produced the four doors for the basilica of Arantzazu, where works by other leading Basque sculptors – Jorge Oteiza, Agustin Ibarrola and Nestor Basterretxea – were also being installed. The following year, he carved a stone monument to the discoverer of penicillin, Sir Alexander Fleming, for a park in San Sebastián (it subsequently disappeared, but a new version has been installed on the promenade at San Sebastián bay). By the early 1970s, his steel sculptures had been installed in front of the Unesco headquarters in Paris, the ThyssenKrupp building in Düsseldorf, and in a courtyard at the World Bank offices in Washington

At their best his works, although massive and monumental, suggest movement and tension. For example, the largest of his works in the United States, De Musica is an 81-ton steel sculpture featuring two pillars with arms that reach out but do not touch. Much of Chillida's work is inspired by his Basque upbringing, and many of his sculptures' titles are in the Basque language Euskera. His steel sculpture De Música III was exhibited at the Yorkshire Sculpture Park in the UK, as part of a retrospective of Chillida's work.

Chillida's cast iron sculpture Topos V has been displayed in Plaça del Rei, Barcelona, since 1986.

Chillida also conceived a distinguished oeuvre of etchings, lithographs and woodcuts since 1959, including illustrations for Jorge Guillen's Mas Alla (1973) and various other books. Some of his bi-dimensional works are used as logos by Basque organizations such as the University of the Basque Country and Gestoras pro Amnistía.

=== Monument to Tolerance, Fuerteventura ===
According to Chillida's plans for a Monument of Tolerance, an artificial cave is to be bored into the mountain. The huge cubic cave, measuring 40 metres (131 ft) along each side, is to be dug from inside a mountain that has long been revered by the inhabitants of the dusty, barren island to the south of Lanzarote. About 64,000 cubic metres of rock will be taken away from the mountain, which rises out of an arid landscape in the north of the island, to create what Chillida called his 'monument to tolerance'. Chillida's original idea was for visitors to experience the immensity of the space.

The project has been in development since 1994, eight years before Chillida's death. In 2011 local authorities decided to go ahead with a project by Chillida inside Mount Tindaya on Fuerteventura despite concerns from environmentalists. As of 2013, local officials are continuing to seek €75 million in private funding.

=== Dialogue with Heidegger ===
In the early 1960s Eduardo Chillida engaged in a dialog with the German philosopher Martin Heidegger. When the two men met, they discovered that from different angles, they were "working with space" in the same way. Heidegger wrote: "We would have to learn to recognize that things themselves are places and do not merely belong to a place," and that sculpture is thereby "...the embodiment of places." Against a traditional view of space as an empty container for discrete bodies, these writings understand the body as already beyond itself in a world of relations and conceive of space as a material medium of relational contact. Sculpture shows us how we belong to the world, a world in the midst of a technological process of uprooting and homelessness. Heidegger suggests how we can still find room to dwell therein.

Chillida has been quoted as saying: "My whole Work is a journey of discovery in Space. Space is the liveliest of all, the one that surrounds us. ...I do not believe so much in experience. I think it is conservative. I believe in perception, which is something else. It is riskier and more progressive. There is something that still wants to progress and grow. Also, this is what I think makes you perceive, and perceiving directly acts upon the present, but with one foot firmly planted in the future. Experience, on the other hand, does the contrary: you are in the present, but with one foot in the past. In other words, I prefer the position of perception. All of my work is the progeny of the question. I am a specialist in asking questions, some without answers."

Other philosophers who have written respectfully about Chillida and his works include Gaston Bachelard and Octavio Paz.

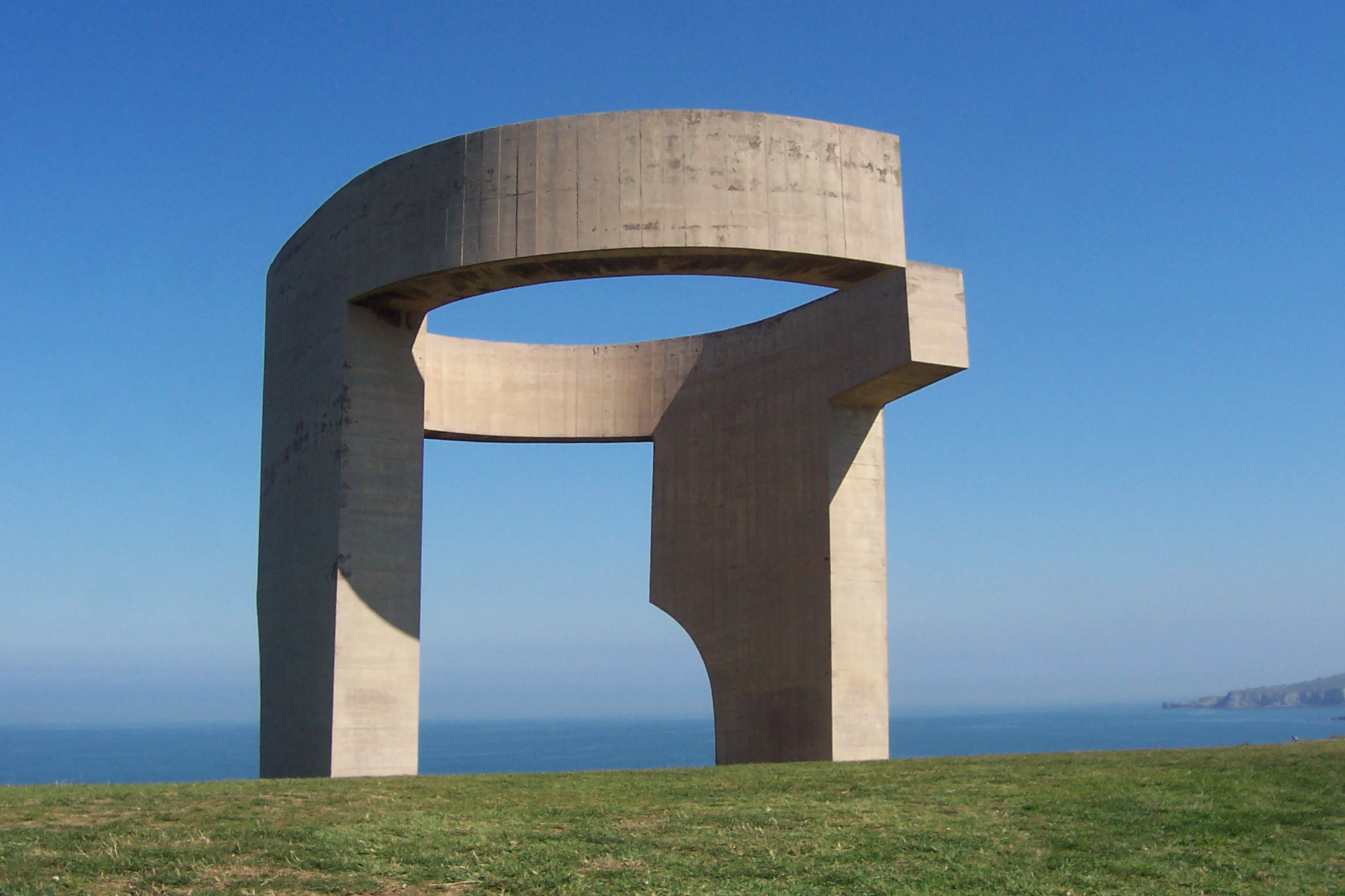
Elogio del Horizonte (Eulogy to the Horizon), concrete (1989), Gijón, Spain

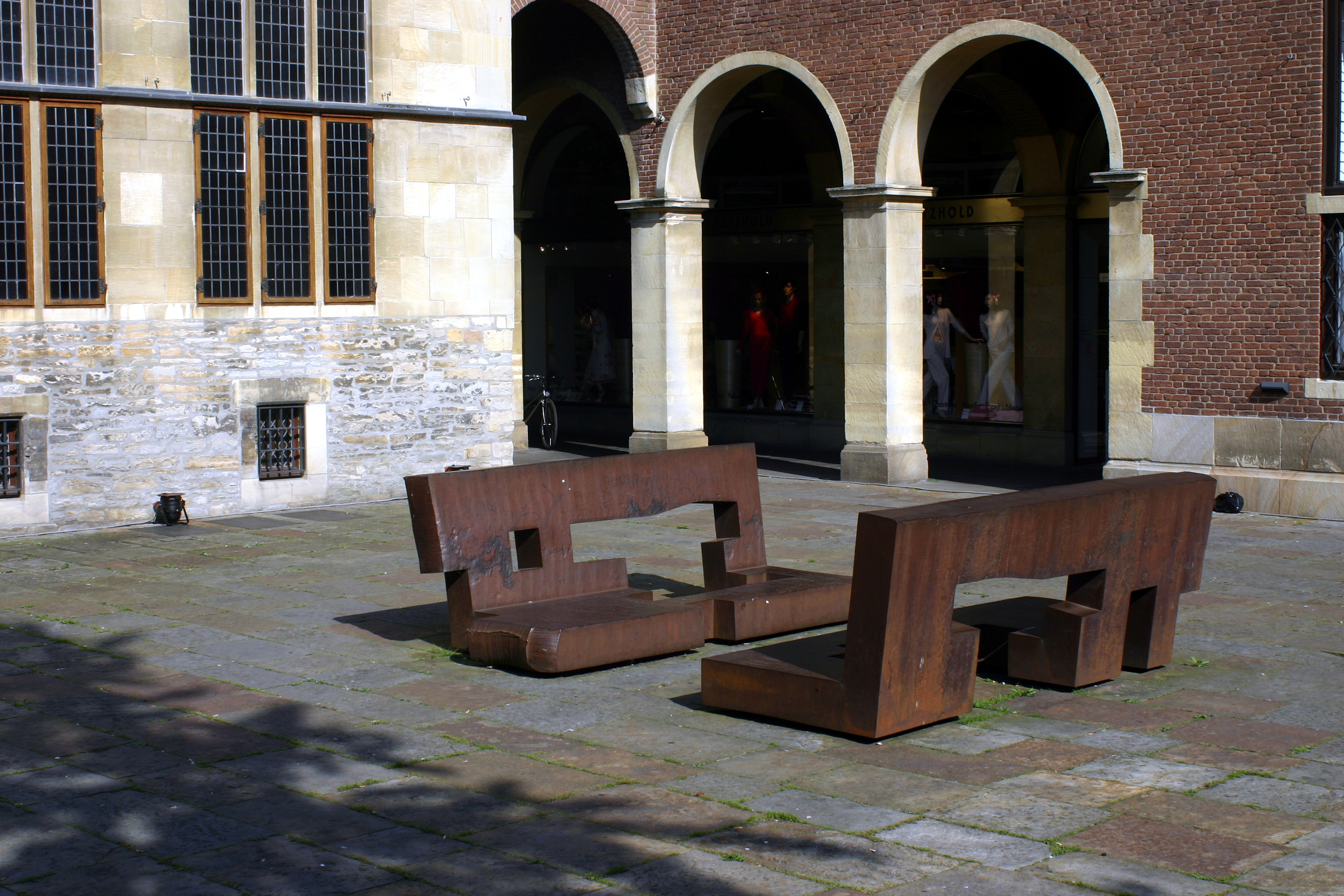
Toleranz durch Dialog, Münster, Germany

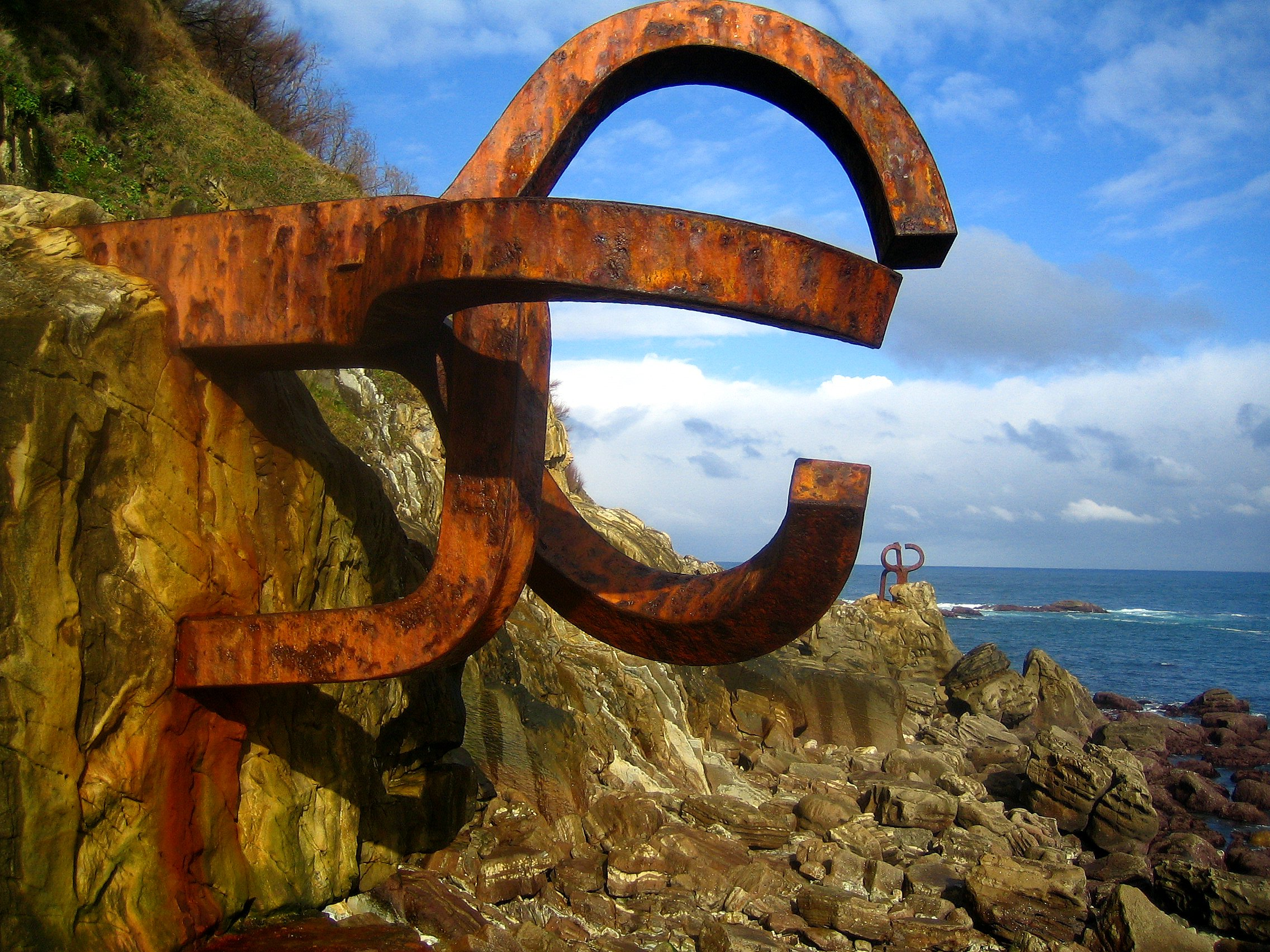
Haizearen orrazia (Wind comb), San Sebastián, Spain

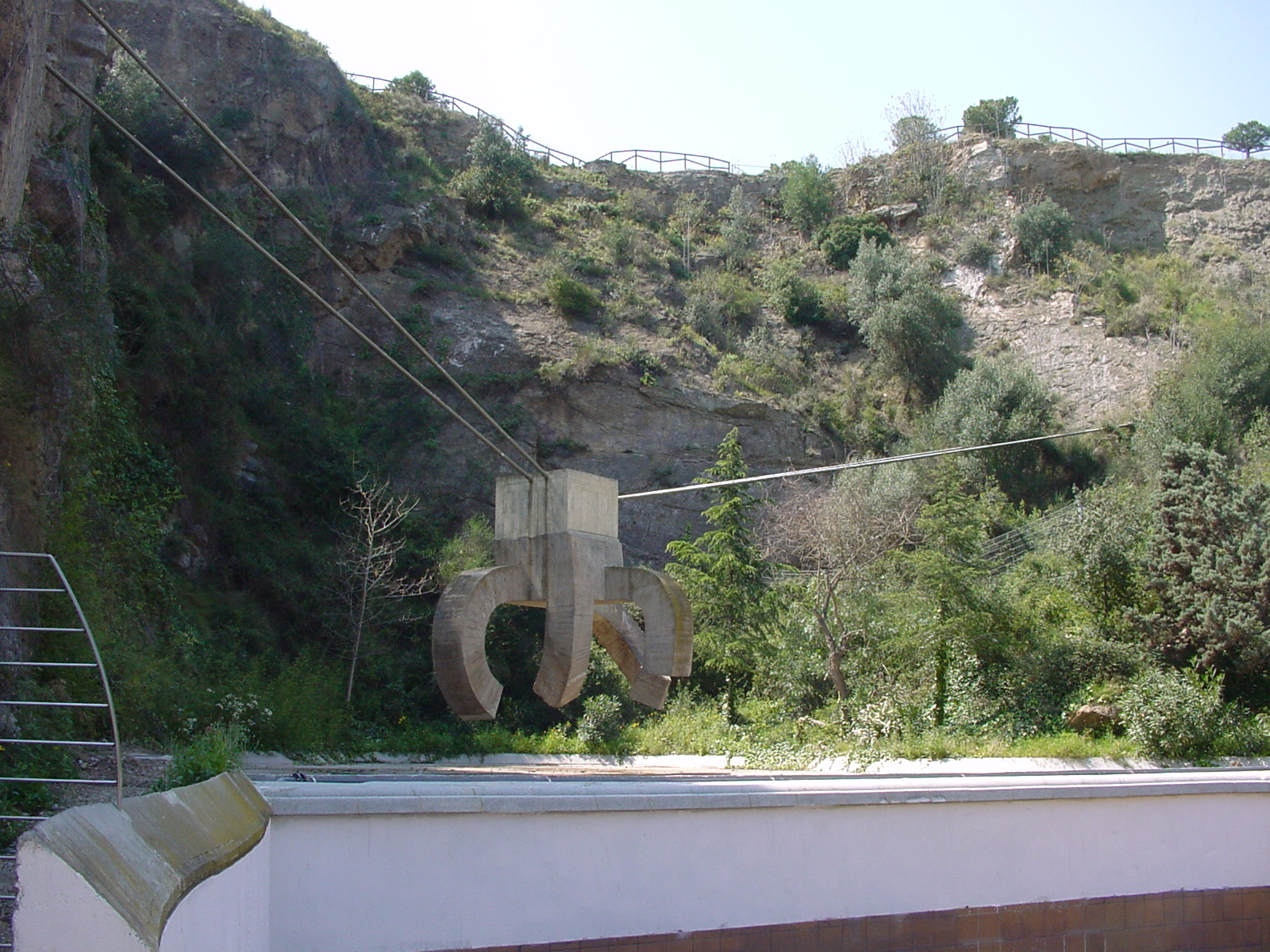
Elogi de l'aigua, Barcelona, Spain

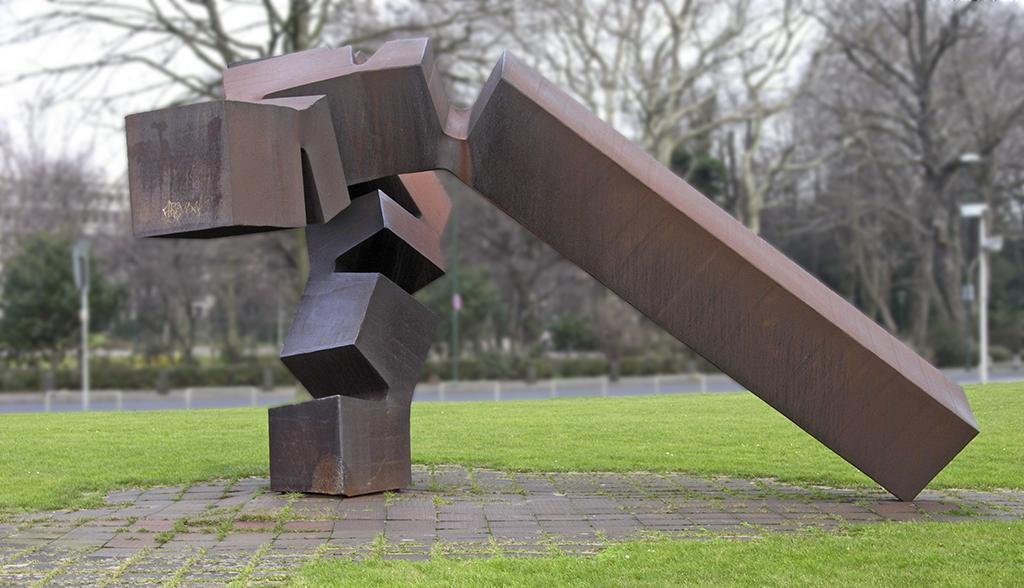
Monumento (1971), Thyssen-Hochhaus, Düsseldorf, Germany

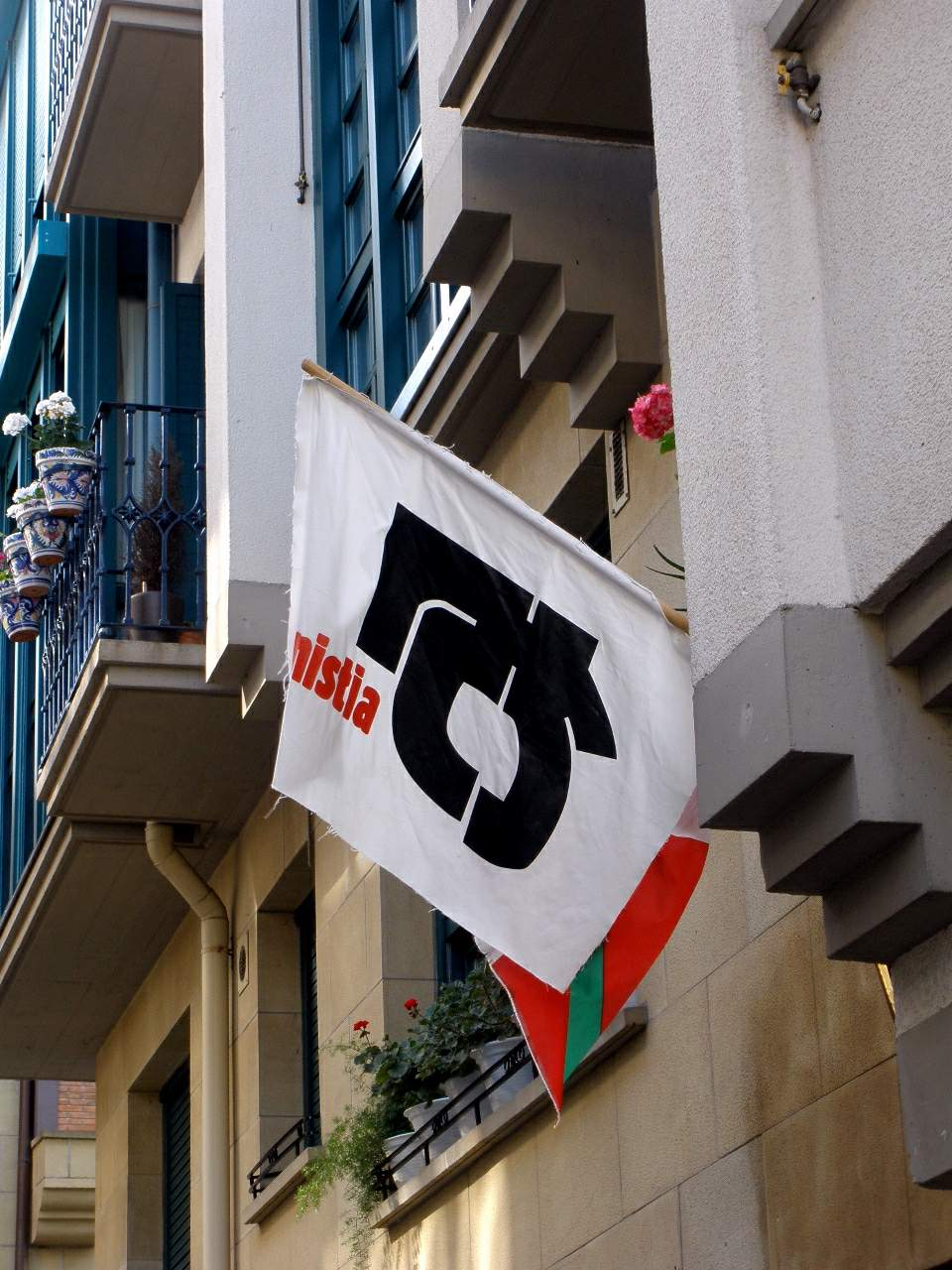
A flag with the logo of Gestoras pro Amnistía

== Exhibitions ==
Chillida exhibited his early work in 1949 in the Salon de Mai at the Musée d'Art Moderne in Paris, and the next year took part in "Les Mains Eblouies", a show of postwar art at the Galerie Maeght. After his first solo exhibition at the Clan Gallery in Madrid in 1954, Chillida exhibited his work in more than 100 one-man shows. He also participated in many international exhibitions, including the Venice Biennale (1958, 1988 and 1990); the Pittsburgh International, where he received the Carnegie Prize for sculpture in 1964 and, in 1978, shared the Andrew W. Mellon Prize with Willem de Kooning; and Documenta II, IV and VI. His first comprehensive retrospective in the United States was mounted by the Museum of Fine Arts, Houston, in 1966. Major retrospectives of Chillida's graphic and sculptural work have since been mounted by the National Gallery in Washington, D.C. (1979), Solomon R. Guggenheim Museum in New York (1980), Palacio de Miramar in San Sebastián (1992); and the Museo Nacional Centro de Arte Reina Sofía in Madrid (1999) and the Guggenheim Museum in Bilbao, Spain (1999).

From 12 February – 11 May 2003, the Museo de Arte Abstracto Español, Cuenca, exhibited Chillida. Praise of the Hand. The exhibition featured sculptures, collages and drawings of Chillada’s created between 1945 and 2000; it later traveled to Museu Fundación Juan March, Palma (23 July – 15 November 2003).

In 2025–2026, the San Diego Museum of Art exhibited his work in Eduardo Chillida: Convergence.

== Major public works ==
Major public works by Chillida are in Barcelona, Berlin, Paris, Frankfurt and Dallas. A large body of his work can be seen in San Sebastián. One, Haizeen orrazia (The Comb of the Wind) a collaboration with Luis Peña Ganchegui, is installed on rocks rising from the Cantabrian Sea at La Concha bay in Sebastián. Perhaps his best-known work in the United States is in front of the I.M. Pei-designed Meyerson Symphony Center in Dallas. De Musica features two pillars with branches that reach out but do not touch. In Washington, a Chillida sculpture is inside the World Bank headquarters. In 1997, a sculpture by Chillida was also on extended loan from Tasende Gallery outside Beverly Hills City Hall, on occasion of Tasende Gallery opening their Los Angeles showroom with a solo presentation by Chillida. In 1986, he installed House of Goethe, a large piece that is a tribute to the German poet and dramatist, Johann Wolfgang von Goethe, in the city of Frankfurt. His monument Diálogo-Tolerancia (Dialogue-Tolerance) was installed in Münster in 1993 to celebrate the Peace of Westfalia. Chillida's sculpture Berlin (2000) for the Federal Chancellery (Berlin) is interpreted as a symbol of German reunification: two crossing hands create a common – in a sense spiritual – place.

== Collections ==
Chillida's sculptures have been collected by major museums, including the Museum of Modern Art and the Metropolitan Museum of Art in New York; the Tate Britain in London; the Kunsthalle Basel in Switzerland; and the Neue Nationalgalerie in Berlin. In 1986 the Chillida collection of the Museo Nacional Centro de Arte Reina Sofía in Madrid was inaugurated; Chillida designed the museum's logo.

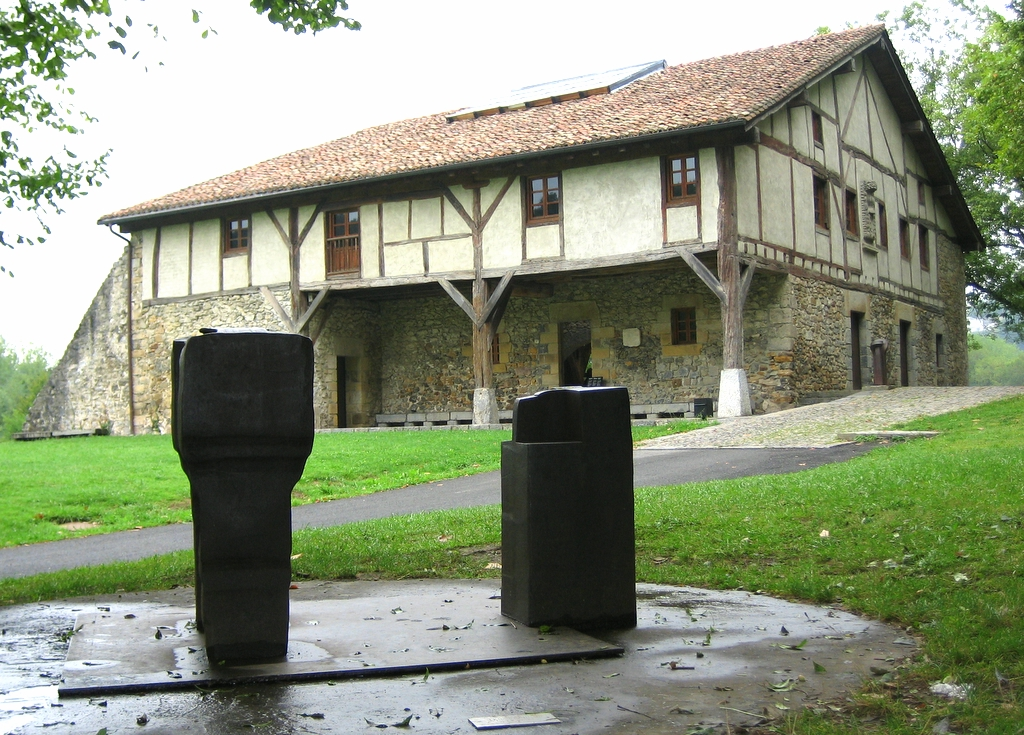
The farmhouse at the Chillida Leku museum

=== Chillida Leku ===
In the early 1980s Chillida and his wife bought a sixteenth century Basque farmhouse and surrounding land at Hernani near San Sebastián to establish a permanent place to display his work in a natural environment. This opened in the 1990s as Chillida Leku, an open-air museum where visitors could wander among the sculptures. The museum closed by 2011 but reopened in 2019 with the backing of Hauser & Wirth, a Swiss modern art gallery. Leku means 'place' in Basque.

== Honours and awards ==
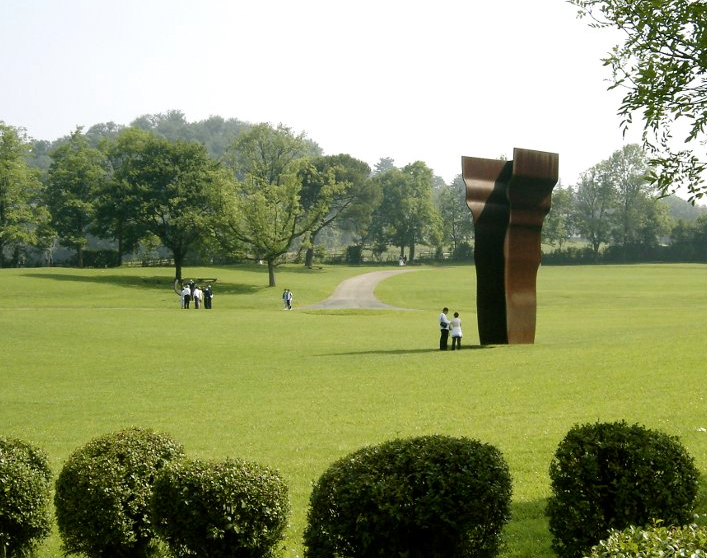
Buscando la luz at the Chillida Leku museum

In 2002, Vitoria-Gasteiz, the capital of the Basque country, awarded its gold medal, the city's highest honor, posthumously to Chillida and the architect Luis Peña Ganchegui, for building a square that has come to symbolize Basque re-emergence following Spain's return to democracy. Other honours include:

- (1998) Recipient of the Lifetime Achievement in Contemporary Sculpture Award International Sculpture Center
- (1991) Recipient of the Praemium Imperiale in Sculpture
- (1987) Recipient of the Premio Príncipe de Asturias de las Artes
- (1985) Recipient of the Wolf Prize in Sculpture
- (1983) Elected an honorary academician by the Royal Academy
- (1998) Elected an honorary Fellow of the Royal Society of Sculptors

== Art market ==
Since 2018, Chillida's estate has been represented by Hauser & Wirth. It previously worked with Pilar Ordovas. Tasende Gallery was the solo US representative of Chillida from the mid 1980s through the 1990s.Tasende Gallery’s representation, including several shows arranged with museums and commercial galleries in the US, presentations at numerous art fairs in the US, Europe and Japan, an extensive advertising campaign, monograph publications and symposiums served to widely introduce Eduardo Chillida to the American art market.

In 2006, Chillida's classic 1961 sculpture, Rumor de Limites, more than doubled estimates to sell to a collector from the Iberian Peninsula for a record £2 million in London. His corten steel sculpture Buscando La Luz IV (Looking for the Light IV) (2001) was sold for 4.1 million pounds at Christie's London in 2013.
