= Virgen Blanca Festivities =

Basque religious festival

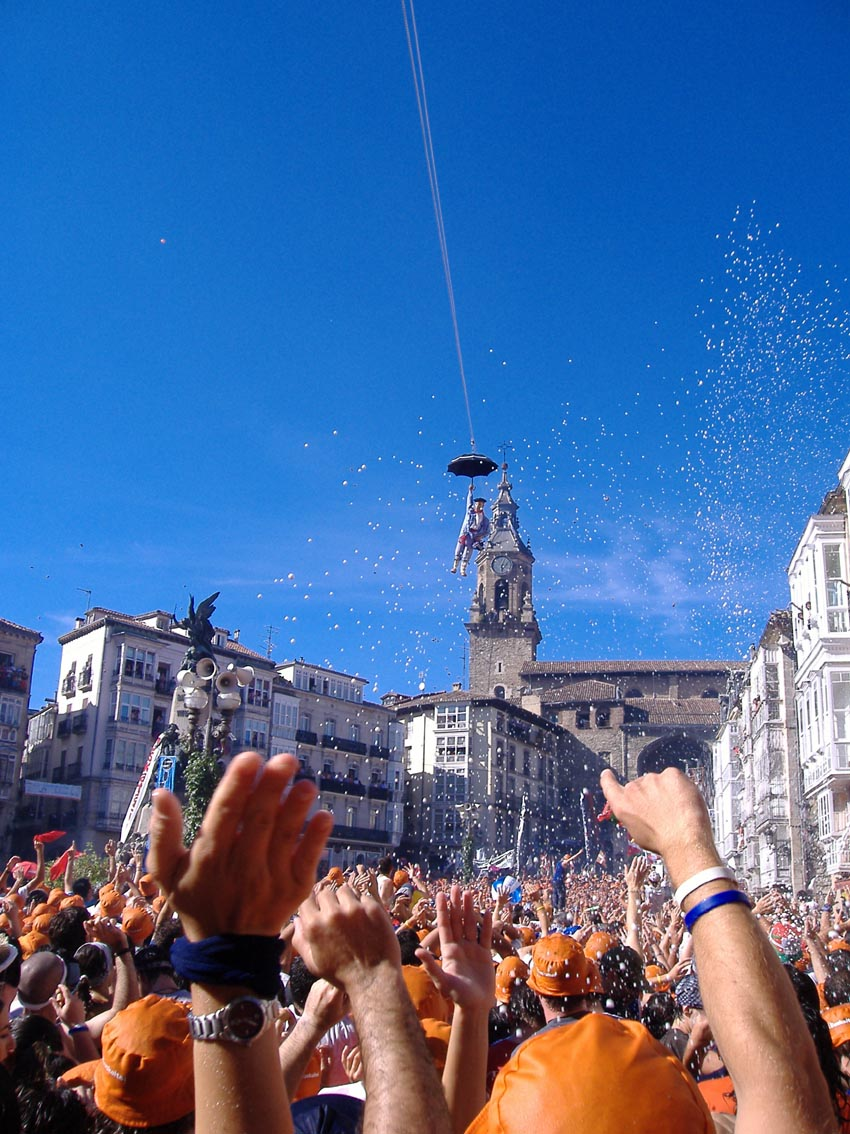
The popular Celedon's Descent.

The Fiestas de la Virgen Blanca (in Basque: Andre Maria Zuriaren Jaiak) have been celebrated in Vitoria-Gasteiz every year, since 1884. It is held on 5 August, but the celebrations begin the day before, on the 4th, and end on 9 August. It honours the patron saint of the city, and features a programme of special events, activities and free open-air concerts.

The actual festivity starts at six o'clock in the afternoon with the txupinazo and Celedón's (a rag doll with an umbrella) descent. Once Celedón reaches a balcony in the square, it is replaced by a human Celedón who then crosses the square on foot with some difficulty amongst the crowds. On arriving to the balcony of the Church of San Miguel, Celedón greets the crowds below and wishes everyone a happy celebration. On the morning of 5 August, the Blusas and the Neskak offer flowers to the Virgen Blanca. On 7 August the Children's Day is celebrated. The little Celedón or Celedón txiki descends in the same square as the first day, and later, Celedón txiki and neska txiki wish a happy celebration to all the children in Vitoria, from the Town Hall. On 10 August at one o'clock in the morning Celedón ascends and this marks the end of the Virgen Blanca Festivities.

== Blusas and Neskak ==
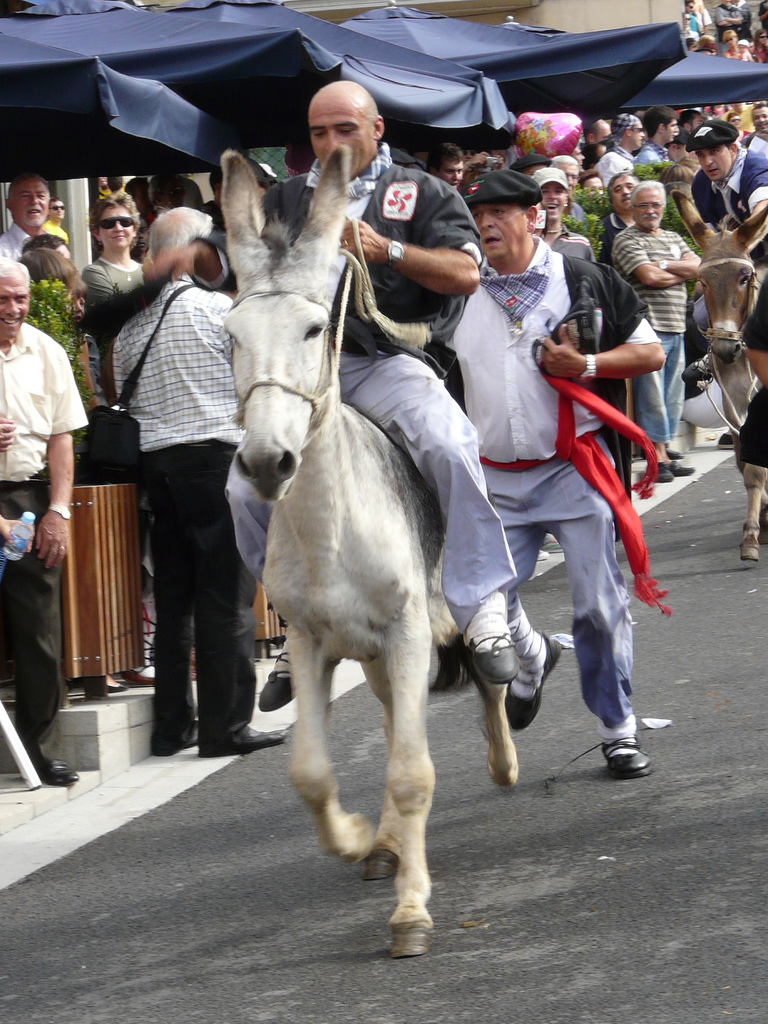
A donkey race is organized on 25 July in anticipation of the Virgen Blanca festivity

These are groups of boys blusas and girls (neskak) from the city, who take an active part throughout the Virgen Blanca festivities. Most groups are made up of both Blusas and Neskak. These groups of friends, get together and take part in a parade from the 'Plaza de España' to the bullring every day. They also organize different activities around the city centre. All groups have their own identity and are given one of the following names:

- Alegrios
- Basatiak
- Batasuna
- Belakiak
- Bereziak
- Biznietos de Celedón
- Los Desiguales
- Galtzagorri
- Gasteiztarrak
- Hegotarrak
- Jatorrak
- Karraxi
- Luken
- Martinikos
- Okerrak
- Nekazariak
- Petralak
- Turutarrak
- Txinpartak
- Txirrita
- Txolintxo
- Zintzarri
- Zoroak
