= Erdem Gündüz =

Turkish dancer

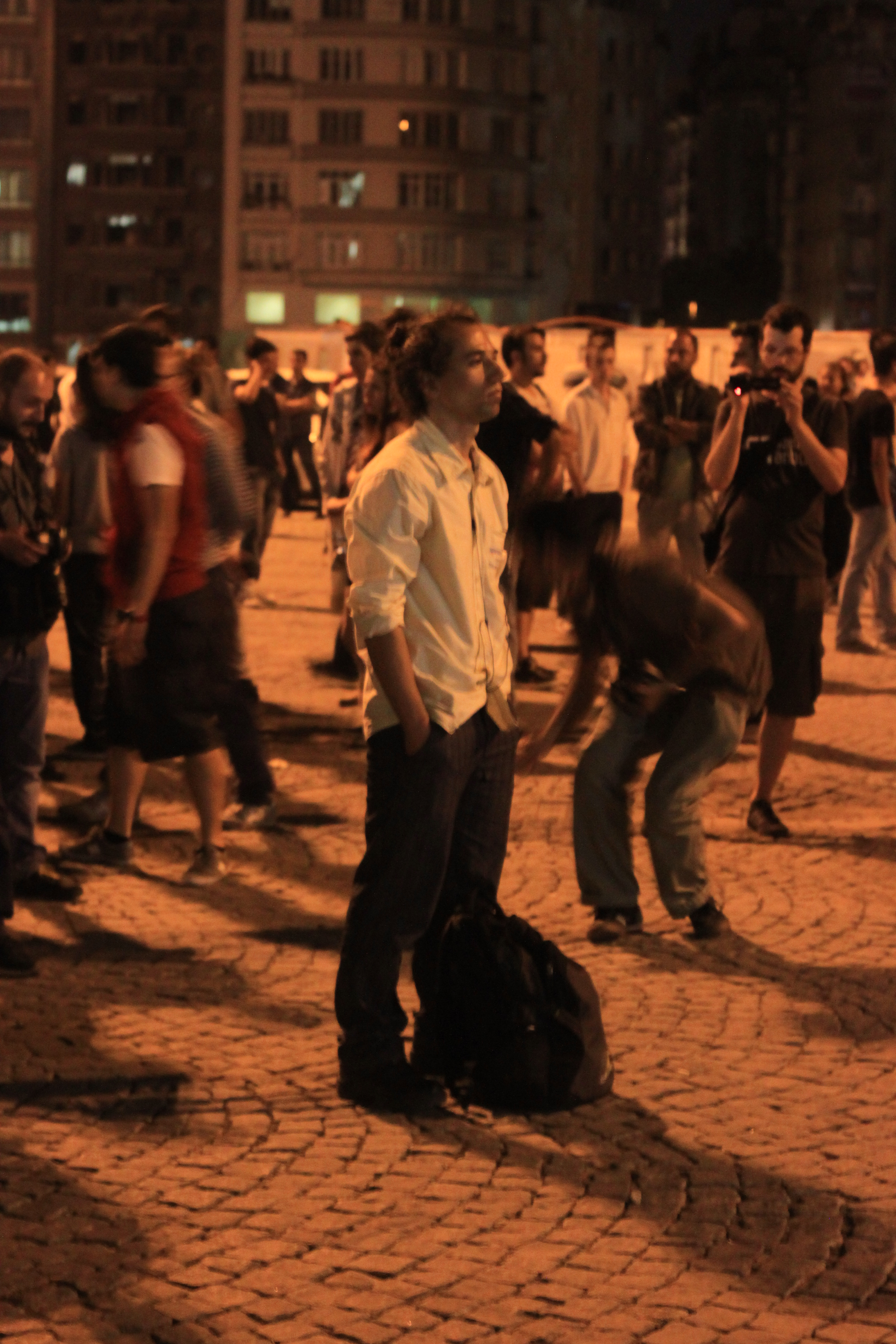
Erdem Gunduz during the Standing Man protest

Erdem Gündüz is a Turkish dancer, actor, performance artist, choreographer, and teacher who, as a result of his actions during the 2013–14 protests in Turkey, has become "the face of the protest movement against the Turkish government." He became internationally known as "The Standing Man" in June 2013 when he stood quietly in Istanbul's Taksim Square as a protest against the conservative government of Recep Tayyip Erdoğan.

Gündüz is interested in the use of "improvisation, ritual, and public action as tools for investigating political realities and social movement."

== Early life and education ==
Gündüz was born in 1979 in Ankara, grew up in İzmir, and now lives in Istanbul.

From 1996 to 2002, he studied in the Electrical and Agriculture departments at the Aegean University in Izmir. In 2003 he transferred to the Yıldız Teknik Üniversitesi in Turkey, where he studied art, design, music, and dance, receiving a B.A. degree. In 2007, as a participant in an exchange program, he took a course at the John F. Kennedy Center for the Performing Arts in the U.S. A year later, he attended a course in “ImPulzTanz” at the Vienna International Dance Festival. In 2008 he completed his studies with a Master of Performing Arts at Mimar Sinan University in Istanbul.

== Career ==
Gündüz has exhibited art works at the Modern Dance Society and Aegean University in Izmir; at the Middle East Technical University in Ankara; at the Istanbul Contemporary Art Museum, Galata Art Space, and the BM Contemporary Art Center in Istanbul; at the Büyük Salon in İzmit; and at the International Festival of Choreographic Miniatures in Belgrade. He has participated in several group projects in Istanbul and Ankara, and has been involved in a number of "dance performance experiences" and "theater performance experiences" in Istanbul, Ankara, Sarajevo, Venice, and elsewhere. He has also been a street performer for many years.

=== Political activities before "standing man" ===
Der Spiegel reported in 2013 that a couple of years earlier Gündüz had "protested the headscarf ban at Turkish universities." The newspaper quoted him as saying that "We tied headscarves on and sat in the lecture halls."

=== Background to Taksim Square protest ===
Peaceful protests began to take place in Istanbul on 28 May 2013 over government plans to eliminate Gezi Park, one of the city's few green areas, and to begin development on the site. Peaceful demonstrators were attacked by police with tear gas and batons, leading to national protests by people who were more concerned about the government's authoritarian response than about Gezi Park. On 17 June, the government prohibited demonstrations in Istanbul. It was two days after police had "swept the square clear of protesters with teargas and water cannon." The Guardian noted that after being "driven from the square and the park", protesters "talked about the need to find new ways of getting their message across."

=== "Standing man" ===
At around 6 p.m. on 17 June, Gündüz drove to Taksim Square, near Gezi Park, which had been sealed off owing to the widespread anti-government protests. He walked to the center of the square and stood there silently in protest against the crackdown on demonstrations in Gezi Park. He was wearing "a white shirt and dark pants, with his backpack in front of him." He also had several bottles of water at his feet. He was facing the Atatürk Cultural Center, which is decked in Turkish flags and at the top of which hangs a large portrait of the founder of modern Turkey, Mustafa Kemal Atatürk, who established Turkey as a secular state.

Gündüz planned to stand silently in the square for a long period – several days, according to some sources; a full month, according to others. The Huffington Post reported that his "plan was to stay standing still there for a month, breaking every 24 hours for three hours' rest, while a friend took his place."

At first his act of nonviolent resistance, which he had not announced in advance and which was unaccompanied by any sign or banner explaining his action, went unnoticed. After he began to draw notice, people "began taking pictures and spreading the word about it on Twitter." Some sources indicate that bystanders began to notice Gündüz's protest after about 15 minutes; others suggest, in the words of the New York Daily News, that "Gündüz stood for several hours unnoticed before his presence on the flashpoint square went viral on the social network Twitter." According to NPR, many of the people on the square "didn't take him very seriously" at first, "with some even mockingly posing for photos with him"; at one juncture, "police and others tried prodding a response out of him." Yet "he remained perfectly still and ignored them. The one occasion he did move, though, was to unbutton his pants in case they wanted to strip search him."

"For this new protest to work," reported one source, "Gündüz's friends positioned themselves outside the square in a bid to prevent well-wishers trying to approach him. One of them, a young woman named Asma, explained, 'We want to protect him from any provocation...He has to be alone in the middle of the square, otherwise the police will use the pretext of a gathering to clear everyone away.'" Over time, "a human chain formed an immense circle around him. Some of the youths there began arguing over whether to join him or stay well clear, as Gündüz's friends wanted."

In time, however, Gündüz was "joined by hundreds of others who in solidarity decided to join his protest by standing for hours on end." According to one source, 300 people joined him over the course of eight hours, standing and staring at the Ataturk Cultural Center. Eventually, at 2 a.m., "Turkish police intervened, clearing the square and arresting several demonstrators," claiming that they were blocking traffic. Some sources indicate that there were ten arrests. According to Reuters, however, "dozens of people who had joined Gündüz at the silent protest were arrested." Some sources maintain that "Gündüz slipped away into the crowd," while Der Spiegel, quoting Gündüz himself, states that police officers detained him but "weren't quite sure what to do with him." The police, reportedly, wondered: "Was it a protest, or was he crazy? Should they really go after a young man who was simply standing there?" The police searched his backpack, finding nothing, and then "made it clear that he should get lost or expect the use of force." Gündüz told Der Spiegel that he then "took three steps back," and when "this didn't make an impression on them…I ended my campaign. I didn't want any further violence."

Gündüz became known as "the standing man." The hashtags "standingman" and "duranadam" ("standing man" in Turkish) went viral on Twitter.

=== Other "standing man" actions ===
As news of Gündüz's action spread, other opponents of the Turkish government began to engage in similar protests around the country. In the words of Zeynep Tufekci, a sociologist and social-media commentator, the "standing man" concept "spread throughout Istanbul and other cities in several hours." A woman in Ankara chose to stand in a spot where a protester had been killed by police. In Ankara, "about 25 'standingman' protesters were detained." Three men stood at a spot in Istanbul, north of Taksim Square, where a Turkish-Armenian journalist, Hrant Dink, had been shot to death in 2007. Also, a group of men and women stood facing a former hotel in the city of Sivas where 37 people, mostly members of the Alevi minority, died in a 1993 fire started during an Islamist protest against the presence at a meeting there of a translator of Salman Rushdie's The Satanic Verses. In Hatay Province on the Syrian border, "a man stood with his hands in his pockets beside a makeshift shrine for Abdullah Comert, who was killed during clashes there between police and protesters."

The Business Insider reported that the day after Gündüz’s protest, "more ‘standing man’ protesters were back in Taksim Square", noting also that "The idea even spread abroad to New York City, showing the global appeal of Turkish protests that began as simple opposition to the demolition of a park in Istanbul."

After Gündüz's protest, Interior Minister Muammer Güler stated "that there would be no police swoop against similar" actions. "If this protest does not harm public order or influence life generally, we will not intervene in such protests," he said.

== Gündüz's views and comments ==
Gündüz, according to the New York Daily News, "sought to play down his importance in demonstrations despite the huge number of people who followed his lead."

"I'm not the type to talk about politics," Gündüz told Der Spiegel after his demonstration. "I'm an artist. I prefer to talk about dance." He said that it was "important that I protest alone, as an individual," explaining that "When one does this in a group, it is immediately considered a terrorist organization." He also stated that, being a dancer, he is "concerned with physicality. What am I supposed to think when a theologian says publicly that pregnant women should no longer show themselves in public because the sight of them is unsavory? When women are encouraged to have at least three, or better yet, five, children? What kind of social concept is that? What kind of understanding of freedom?"

He told Hürriyet TV: "Maybe the media and people will learn something from this silent standing, this resistance...Maybe they will feel some empathy. I am just an ordinary citizen of this country. We want our voices to be heard."

Gündüz told the BBC: "I am just one protester, I'm just one artist. There are many artists and many, many young people on the streets. I am nothing[,] but the idea is important, why people resist the government but the government didn't want to understand, didn't try to understand why people are on the streets [for] 19 days." He also told the BBC that "The real violence is not showing what is going on...Four people have died, there are thousands of wounded, but the media, unfortunately, has shown us nothing."

According to Der Spiegel, Gündüz "has no party affiliation, nor does he oppose Prime Minister Recep Tayyip Erdogan's government or support the opposition. But, like thousands of others, he has been drawn to demonstrations at Gezi Park, where people are protesting the authoritarian leadership of the country." The Guardian, however, described Gündüz as a "left-Kemalist."

== Reactions ==
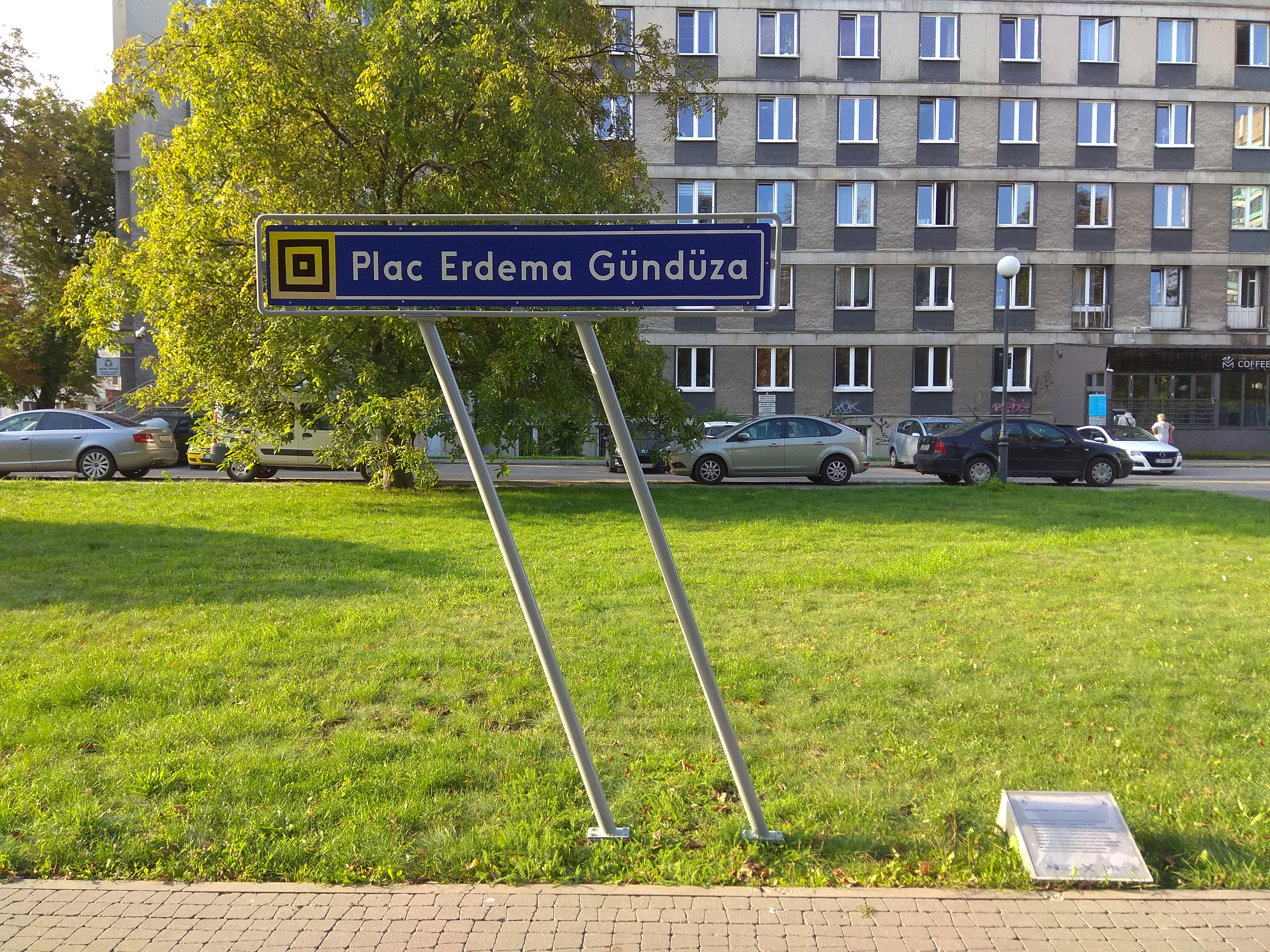
Square in Lublin, "named" after Erdem Gündüz as an art installation (Zbigniew Libera)

As one source put it, Gündüz's "quiet image seems to have struck a cord [sic] with sympathizers who are more used to seeing violent images of stone-throwing youths battling police officers and tear gas." Commentators pointed out that Gündüz's peaceful, solitary protest formed a sharp contrast with the recent violent clashes in which approximately 5,000 people had been injured and at least four had died. Many observers have compared his action to that of Tank Man, the single anti-government protester who had blocked a line of tanks in Beijing's Tiananmen Square in 1989.

Gündüz has "had many imitators, and some claim they chose this form of protest before Gündüz," reported Der Spiegel. "Many are in awe of him, but he is also hated." It has been suggested that the "standing man" approach to resistance "could prove more difficult for the government to antagonize and meet with force."

"Erdem Gündüz is a legend," wrote Richard Seymour in The Guardian. "And all he had to do to earn this status was to stand completely still." Seymour described his action as "a silent, stubborn and dignified protest against the brutality of the police response to demonstrators, which had culminated in a sinister weekend assault whose targets included medics and staff who treated the wounded. Indeed, the ministry of health went so far as to threaten to withdraw the licences of medical personnel who treated protesters injured by police." Seymour noted that Gündüz's action drew on "the tradition of passive resistance," that such actions have "been the death knell of recalcitrant regimes," and that "passive resistance is not merely symbolic; it confuses and derails the calculations of the rulers." Gündüz's protest, maintained Seymour, "was both an affront and a question for the authorities: beat him? Why? He's just standing there. Leave him alone? Then he wins, doesn't he?" The "moving, motionless protest," Seymour opined, "is a symbol of great peril for the Turkish regime."

== Honors and awards ==
In 2005, the Turco-British Association gave him a prize for his work at the University Students' Art Exhibition.

Gündüz won the M100 Media Award, a human-rights award, in Potsdam, Germany, in 2013.

The Human Rights Foundation awarded Gündüz the 2014 Václav Havel Prize for Creative Dissent on 2 May. Gündüz' fellow 2014 laureates are the members of Russian punk protest group Pussy Riot.

== Future ==
Although he is aware of photographs of himself "with a bull's-eye on them," Gündüz "is not afraid," saying that even if Erdogan gives in to protesters, "a new government leader will come in and do similar things." Turkey's authoritarian system, he said, "must be eliminated to make room for more democracy and freedom." Although he intends to continue to agitate for change, however, he "isn't planning a repeat performance" of his standing-man act, explaining: "One does something like that once, and that's it."

== See also ==
- 2013–14 protests in Turkey
- Media censorship and disinformation during the 2013 protests in Turkey
- Tank Man
- Timeline of the 2013 protests in Turkey
