= Timeline of the Gezi Park protests =

The following is a timeline of the Gezi Park protests in Turkey of citizens and supporters against actions and plans of the government of Turkey. The timeline is segmented into days.

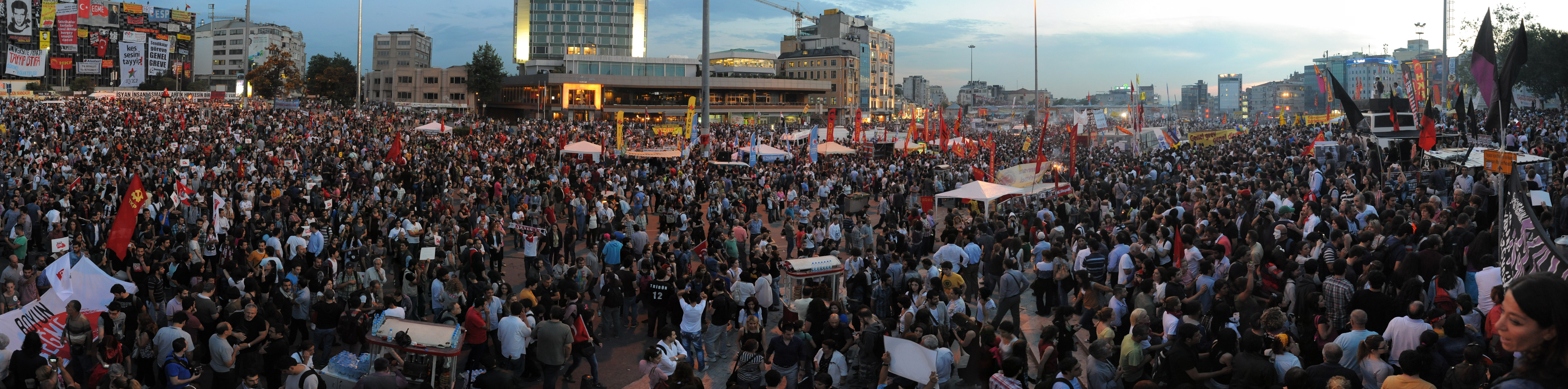
Panorama of Taksim Square protests on 7 June 2013. The building at the top left covered in banners is the Atatürk Cultural Center.

== 28–31 May 2013 ==
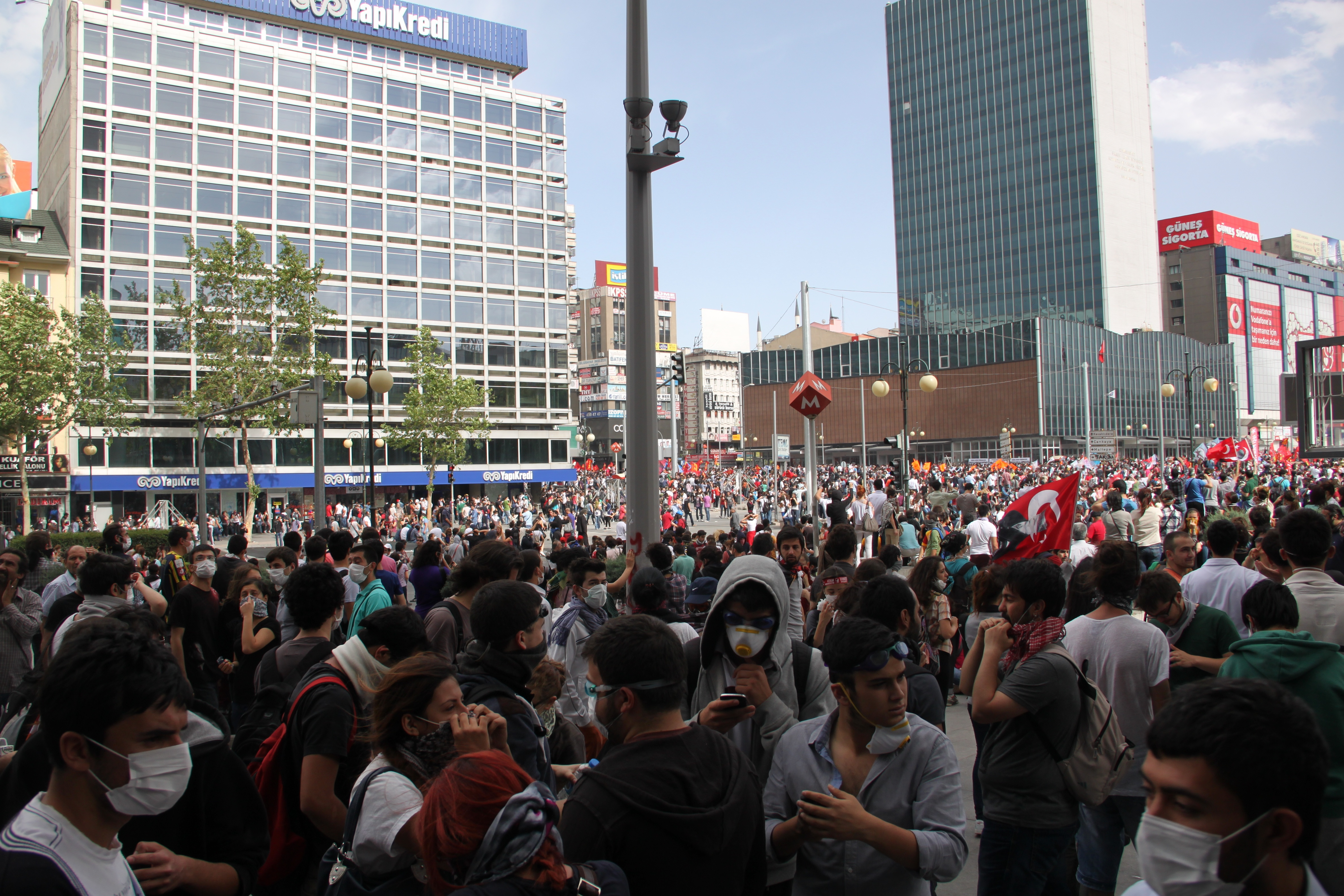
Gezi protest in Kızılay Square, Ankara.

On the morning of 28 May, around 50 environmentalists were camping out in Istanbul at Gezi Park, in order to prevent its demolition. The protesters, with the help of BDP MP Sırrı Süreyya Önder, initially halted attempts to bulldoze the park by refusing to leave. The Zabıta municipal police used tear gas to disperse the peaceful protesters and burned down their tents in order to allow the bulldozing to continue. Photos of the scene, such as an image of a young female protester (later nicknamed the "woman in red") holding her ground while being sprayed by a policeman, quickly spread throughout the media across the world. The Washington Post reported that the image "encapsulates Turkey's protests and the severe police crackdown", while Reuters called the image an "iconic leitmotif".

Alerted to the happenings by social media, on 29 May the size of the protests grew, as additional protesters joined the encampment and put up more tents. Other prominent people joined Sırrı Süreyya Önder in the protest, including Republican People's Party vice president Gürsel Tekin, actors and actresses Gonca Vuslateri, Memet Ali Alabora, Okan Bayülgen and Şebnem Sönmez.

On 30 May, police raided the protesters' encampments. Online activists' calls for support against the police crackdown increased the number of sit-in protesters by the evening.

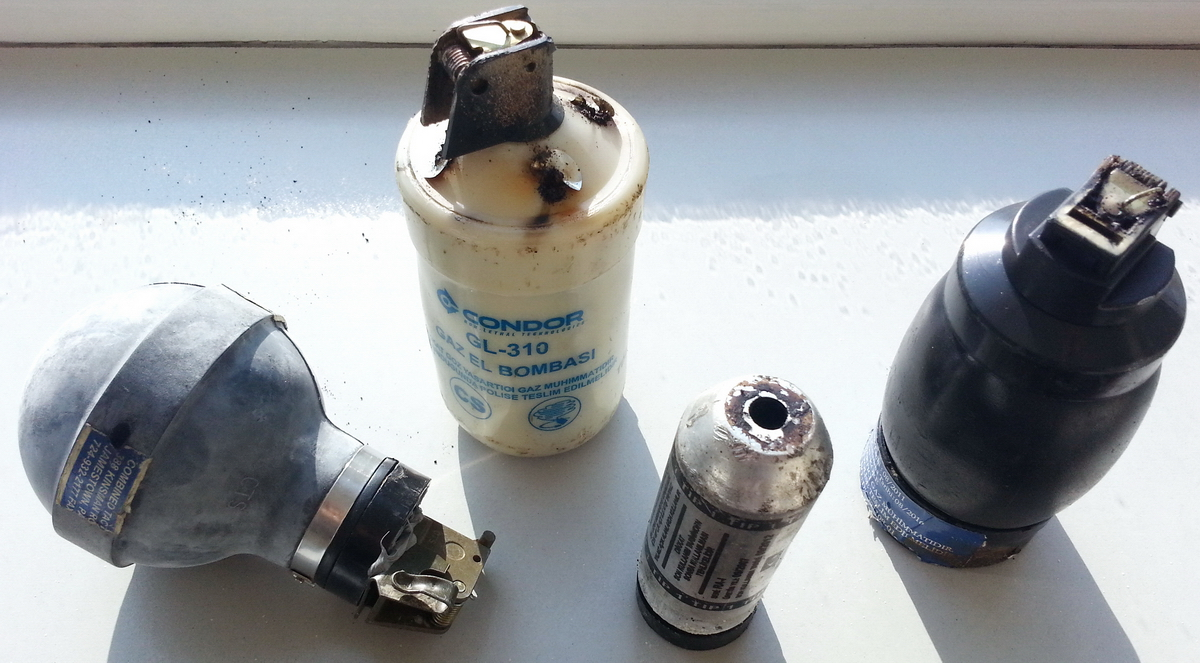
Tear gas shells used in Istanbul in 2013.

Police carried out another raid on the encampment in the early morning of 31 May. The police used water cannons and tear gas to disperse the protesters to surrounding areas and set up barricades around the park to prevent re-occupation. Throughout the day, the police continued to fire tear gas, pepper spray and water cannons at demonstrators, resulting in reports of more than 100 injuries. Sırrı Süreyya Önder was hospitalised after being hit in the shoulder by a tear gas canister. Some protesters threw rocks at the security forces. The executive order regarding the process decided earlier had been declared as 'on-hold' on 31 May 2013. 10,000 gathered in Istiklal Avenue. According to governor Hüseyin Avni Mutlu, 63 people had been arrested and detained. The police use of tear gas was criticised for being "indiscriminate". The interior minister, Muammer Guler, said the claims of the use of disproportionate force would be investigated.

Protests also spread to Ankara and İzmir. In Ankara, a helicopter was used to fire tear gas at the protesters, and police were seen chasing demonstrators into shops with electric shock batons. Clashes between protesters and security forces continued all night long in Ankara. In İzmir, more than 10,000 people held a protest on 31 May, with demonstrators holding banners reading "Everywhere is Taksim, everywhere is resistance", "Resist Taksim, İzmir is with you", and "Chemical Erdoğan". Protesters in İzmir were also raided by police armed with tear gas, plastic bullets and water cannons.

== 1 June ==
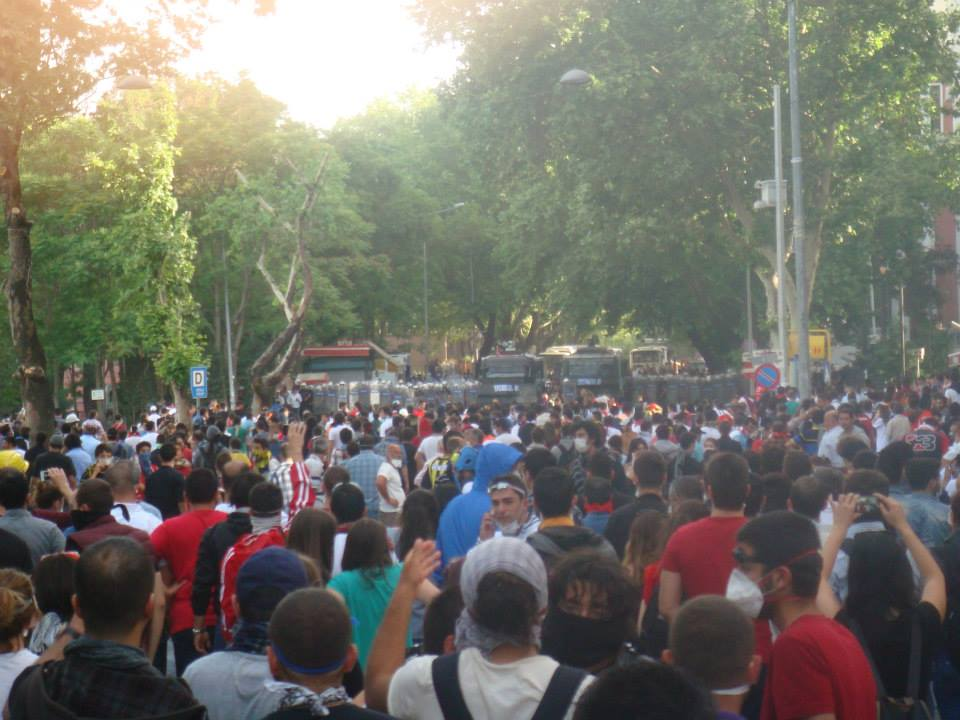
Gezi protest in Ankara.

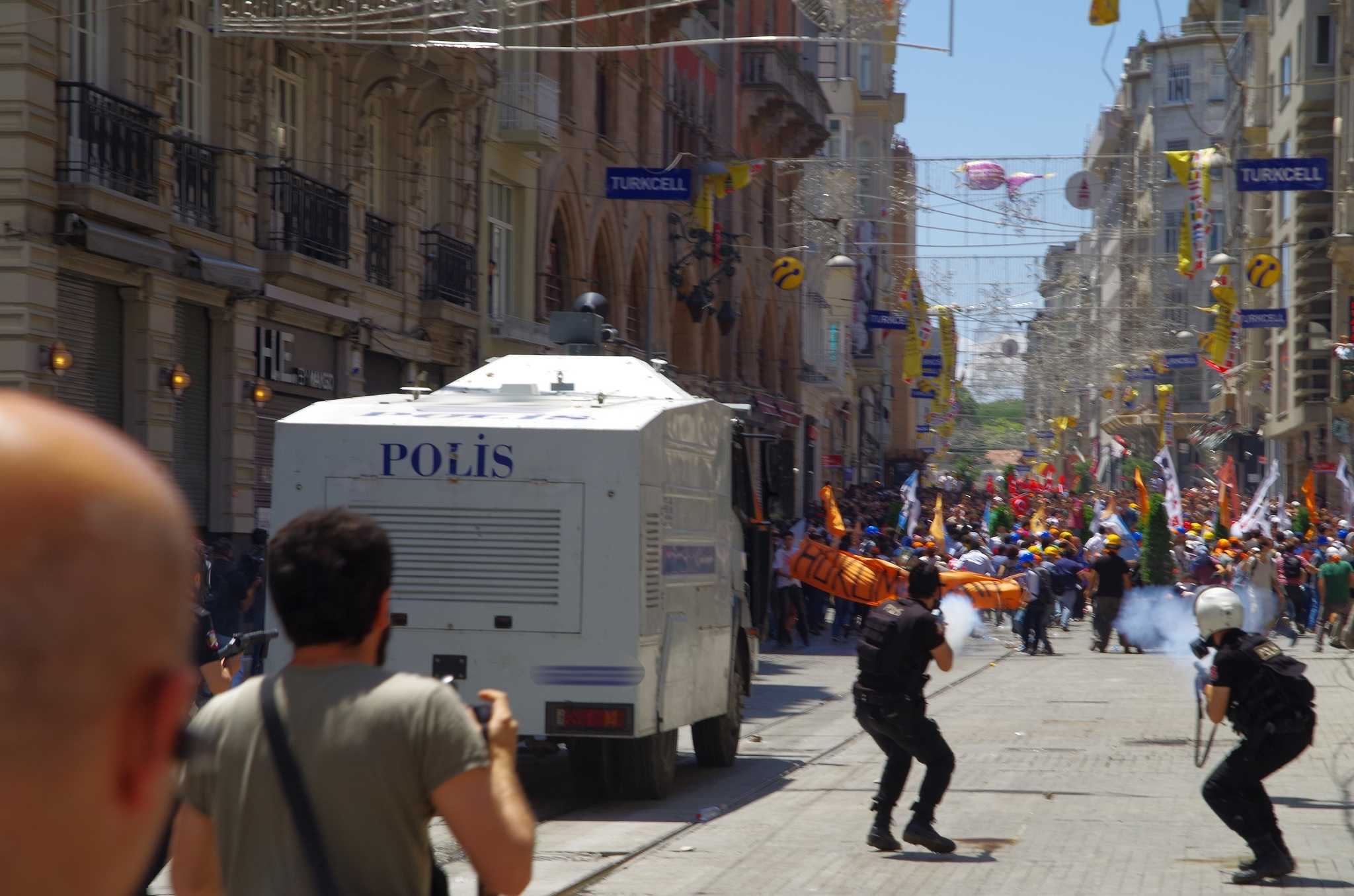
Police fires tear gas on the İstiklal Avenue

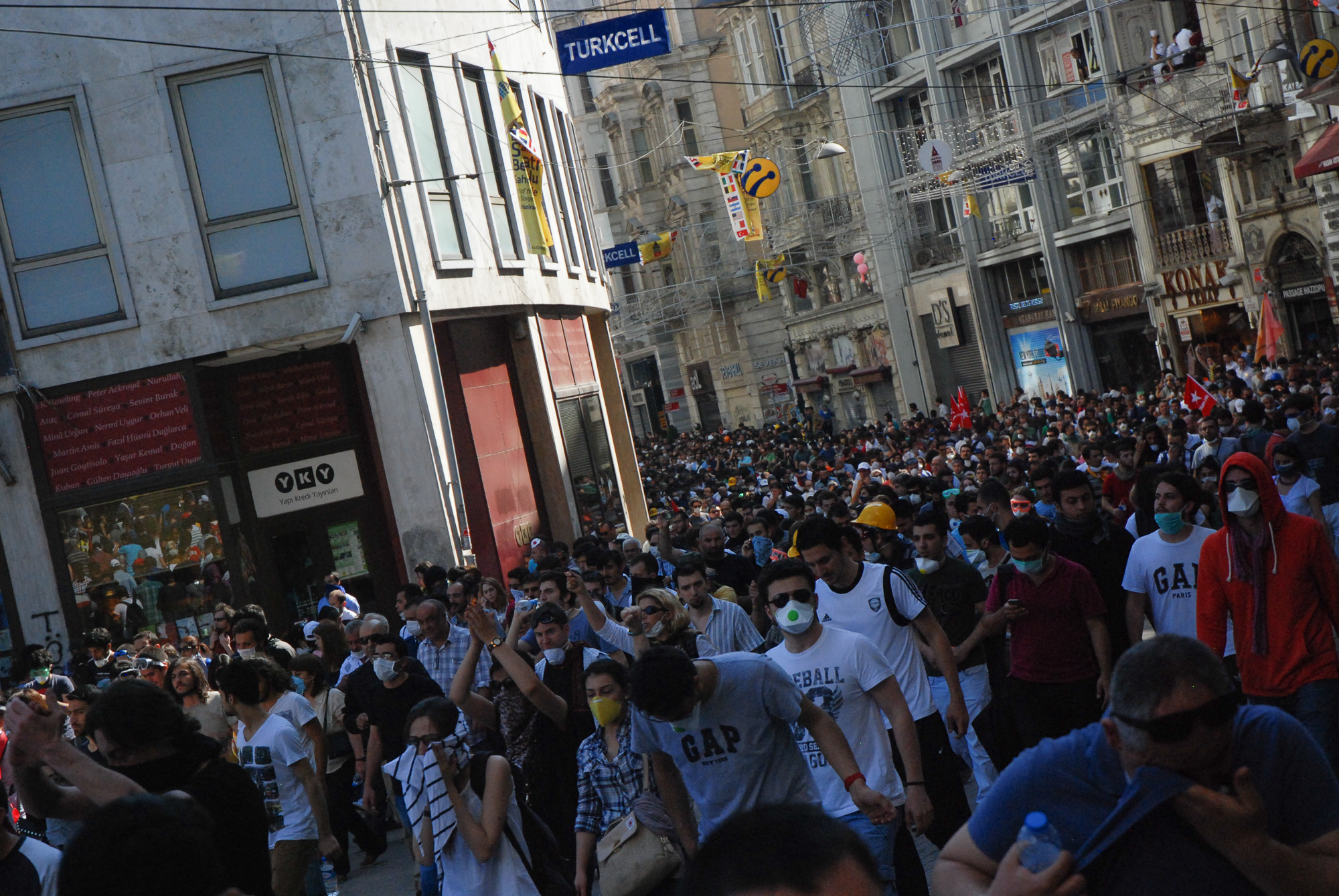
Gezi protesters in İstiklal Avenue

"About half past one the entire city [of Istanbul] started to reverberate. People were banging on pots, pans, blowing whistles," one eye-witness told BBC News. Deputy Prime Minister Bülent Arınç criticized the use of tear gas against demonstrators and stated, "It would have been more helpful to try and persuade the people who said they didn't want a shopping mall, instead of spraying them with tear gas".

Thousands of protesters from Kadıköy (the Asian side of the city) walked across the Bosphorus Bridge around 06:00 local time, to join the main protest groups in Taksim. They were met with police intervention.

At 3:45 pm, the police force started to withdraw from Taksim Square, letting protesters in. During the withdrawal, some protesters threw water bottles at the security forces, which resulted in the police use of tear gas.

The protests in Ankara that began on 31 May continued. The protesters, gathered mainly on Güven Park in the Kızılay neighborhood, were also interrupted by the police officers. The roads to the Kızılay square where protesters tried to gather were closed by the security forces. The security around the Başbakanlık Konutu and the Grand National Assembly of Turkey were also increased with the aid of the Turkish Gendarmerie. The security forces left the Kızılay square later and then nearly 10,000 people gathered there. During these protests an armed police water cannon called "TOMA (Intervention Vehicle against Social Incidents)" ran over a protester that was hiding behind the police barricades.

In Antalya, more than 10,000 people held a protest on 31 May, in Cumhuriyet square. Nearly 1,000 people tried to walk to the Çallı district where the AKP Antalya Headquarters are situated. Police met the protesters with tear gas and water cannons.

The president Abdullah Gul, also a member of the AKP, cut short a formal visit to Turkmenistan to return home and by midday stated that the protests had reached a "worrisome level".

Some have reported rumors of the police using a novel riot control chemical which some are calling "Agent Orange" against the protesters in Beşiktaş, but these are left as rumors as journalists (CNN, etc.) and experts told people that the police used a colored substance, mostly colored teargas and a colored gas to identify where the person got hit is. Though bearing the same nickname as herbicides and defoliants used by the British military during the Malayan Emergency and the US Military during the Vietnam War, the chemical used is believed to be a riot control chemical such as CR gas or the Skunk anti-riot chemical.

Helicopters have fired tear gas canisters into residential neighborhoods and police have used tear gas to try to smoke people out of buildings. Footage on YouTube showed one protester being hit by an armored police truck as it charged a barricade.

Prime Minister Tayyip Erdogan gave a televised speech condemning the protesters and vowing that "where they gather 20, I will get up and gather 200,000 people. Where they gather 100,000, I will bring together one million from my party".

It was also announced that Erdogan would leave for an overseas official visit to Morocco, Algeria and Tunisia and hence leave the country between 3 and 6 June during deepening domestic turmoil causing unprecedented resentment and outcry regarding prime ministerial travel expenses and purposes.

== 2 June ==
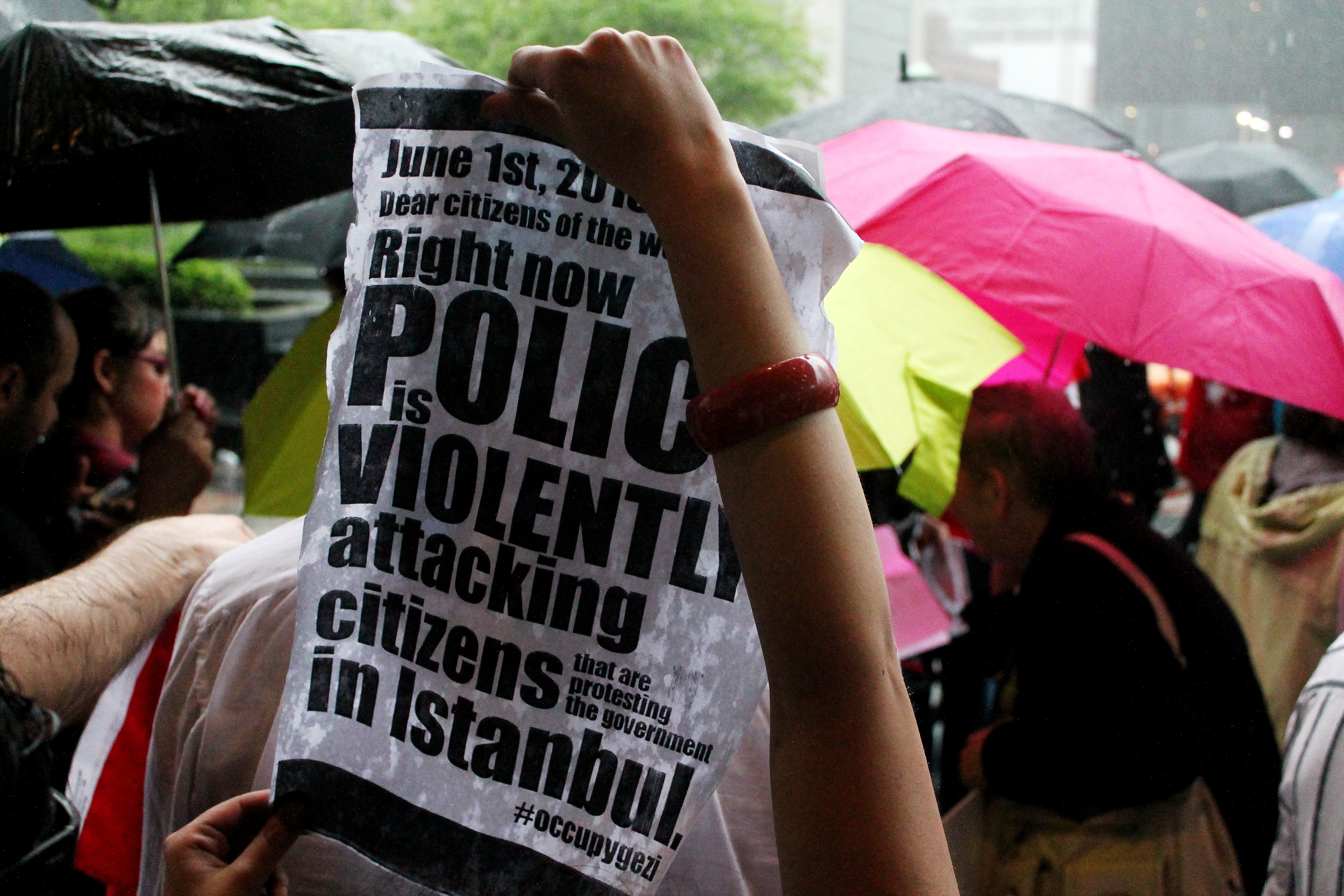
This sign, displayed in a solidarity protest in Chicago, reads: Dear citizen [sic] [recte citizens] of the world! Right now Police is [sic] violently attacking citizens that are protesting the government in Istanbul.

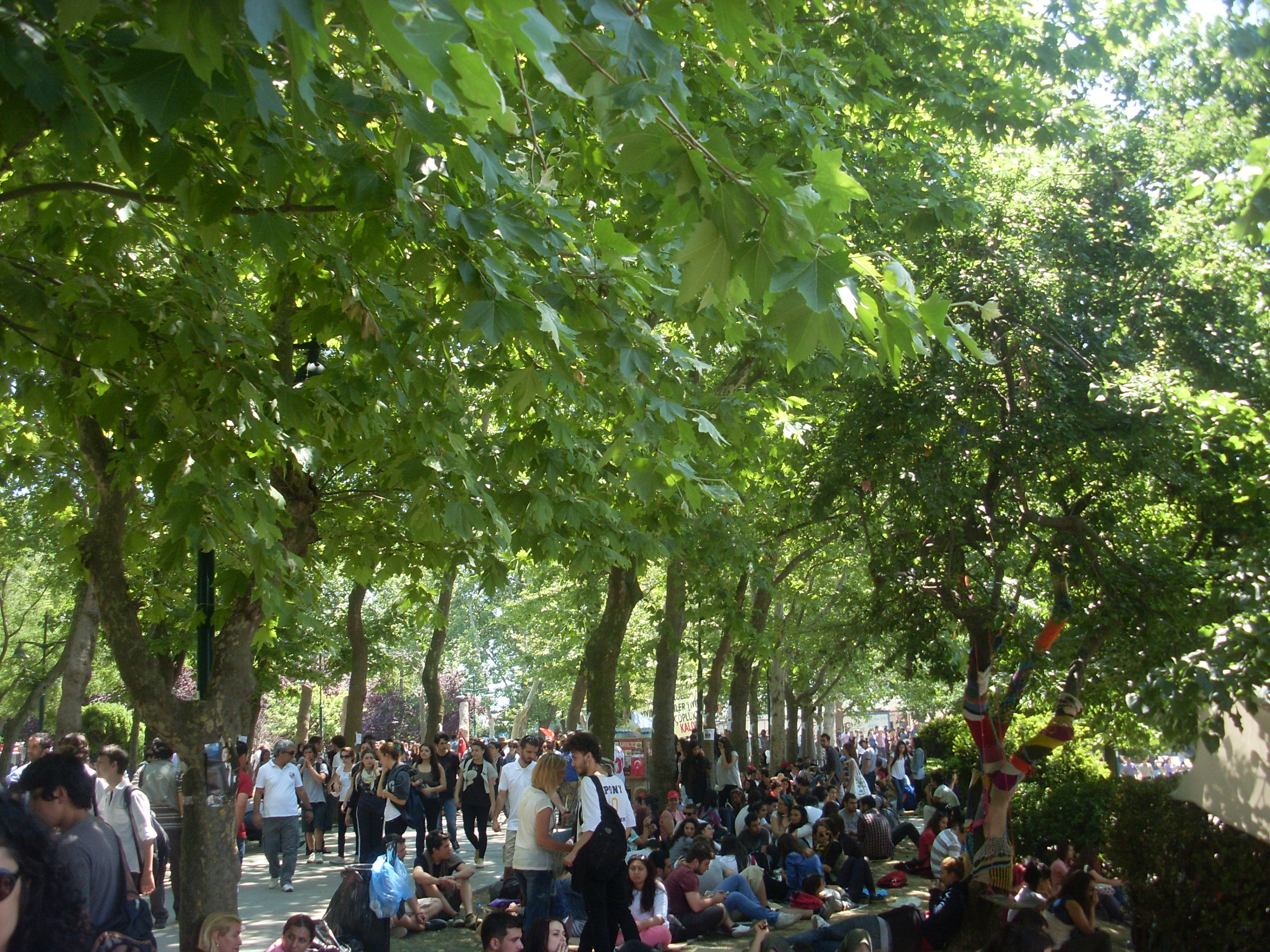
Protesters regained the park from police after days of violent clashes

Videos showing the extent of police brutality started to surface on various websites. Other footage also showed police firing gas grenades directly at demonstrators. It was reported that Turkey's President Abdullah Gül contacted other senior leaders urging "moderation". After the call, Interior Minister Muammer Güler ordered police to withdraw from Taksim, allowing protesters to re-occupy the square. Protesters "shun violence". Demonstrators returning to the square organized to clean the square, which has become littered with debris.

In the afternoon Tayyip Erdoğan raised the possibility of building a museum instead of a shopping mall in the place of the Atatürk Cultural Center and Opera house, which currently stands to be demolished in Taksim Square. This mosque was probably part of the big project for redesigning Taksim but details were unknown before.

In İzmir, the day started with people, who started to clean the main streets and squares, which were polluted by the protests during 1 June. People cleaned the city almost for 5 hours but as the crowd got bigger and the police has been positioned around, cleaning stopped. Soon the crowd and protests got bigger. Police used random violence to disperse the crowds, even hitting teen girls on the boulevard. İzmir's Bornova and Alsancak neighborhoods saw fierce battles between protesters and riot police throughout the afternoon, with dozens of arrests made and damage to stores in the center of town by the police's use of water cannons. The Mayor of İzmir Metropolitan Municipality, Aziz Kocaoğlu (CHP), got out in his civil outfit and walked with people to support the nature and democracy act.

In Istanbul police blocked the Bosphorus bridge to prevent protesters crossing to the European side as they had on previous days. While the tension at Taksim square remained low, fights broke out between police and protesters in other neighborhoods of the city, such as Beşiktaş. Protesters repeatedly tried to get near to the office of the prime minister. Thousands of protesters went to media buildings in Istanbul, such as those of HaberTurk, that was airing an interview with the prime minister at that moment.

Particular anger was also provoked by the sighting of several civilians armed with bats and sticks following police on their way to curb protests, apparently with police support. Several videos showed armed civilians aiding police in brutally cracking down on protesters. Some civilians in videos and photos have been linked to positions in Ak Gençlik Kolları, the youth wing of the AKP. The use of AKP members in cracking down fueled further fury against the police and resulted in a bulldozer being hijacked in Beşiktaş, Istanbul and being driven towards police positions. Although initially resulting in police retreat, the bulldozer was finally set alight in the early hours of midnight.

Other cities where violent confrontations occurred between protesters and police were Adana and Antakya, not far from the Syrian border.

Reports emerged that the once powerful army faction that remained loyal to the secular establishment that the AKP largely watered down in its influence were distributing gas masks as assistance to protesters.

== 3 June ==
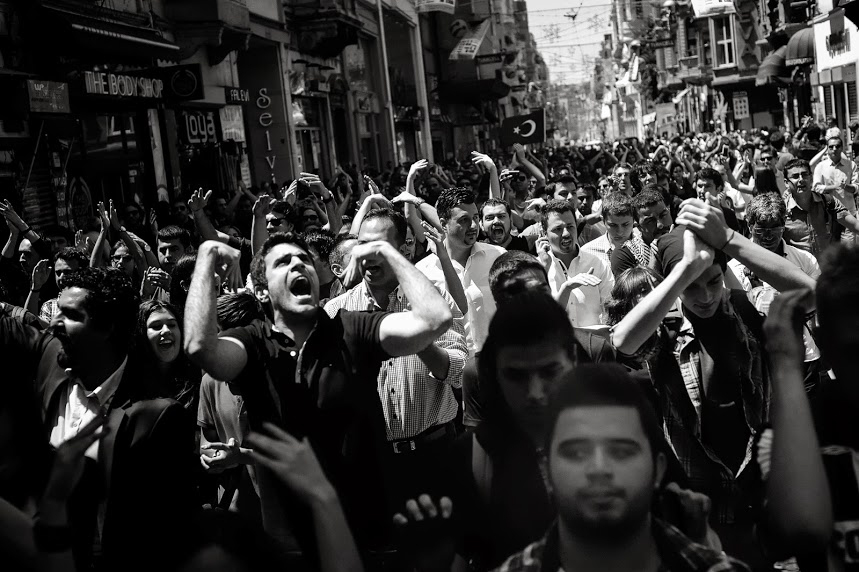
Protesters marching through Siraselviler Cd towards Taksim Square on 3 June 2013.

During the night riot police fired tear gas directly into the homes of civilians. Throughout Istanbul, and in different neighborhoods of Ankara, İzmir and Antalya, clashes occurred throughout the night. Protesters in İzmir set fire to the AKP's headquarters in the city. CNN Türk, the Turkish CNN channel, joined Ulusal Kanal and Halk TV in broadcasting live footage from the protests.

The Dolmabahçe Mosque welcomed protesters in and became a makeshift hospital; local restaurants and hotels also sheltered protesters. In Beşiktaş tourists and demonstrators were treated in mosques for severe injuries due to lack of ambulances. Police reportedly committed random acts of violence against protesters. The Shangri-La Hotel was used as a makeshift hospital as well.

AKP sympathizers were allegedly seen attacking men and woman on the streets of İzmir. In some cities AKP voters accompanied police.

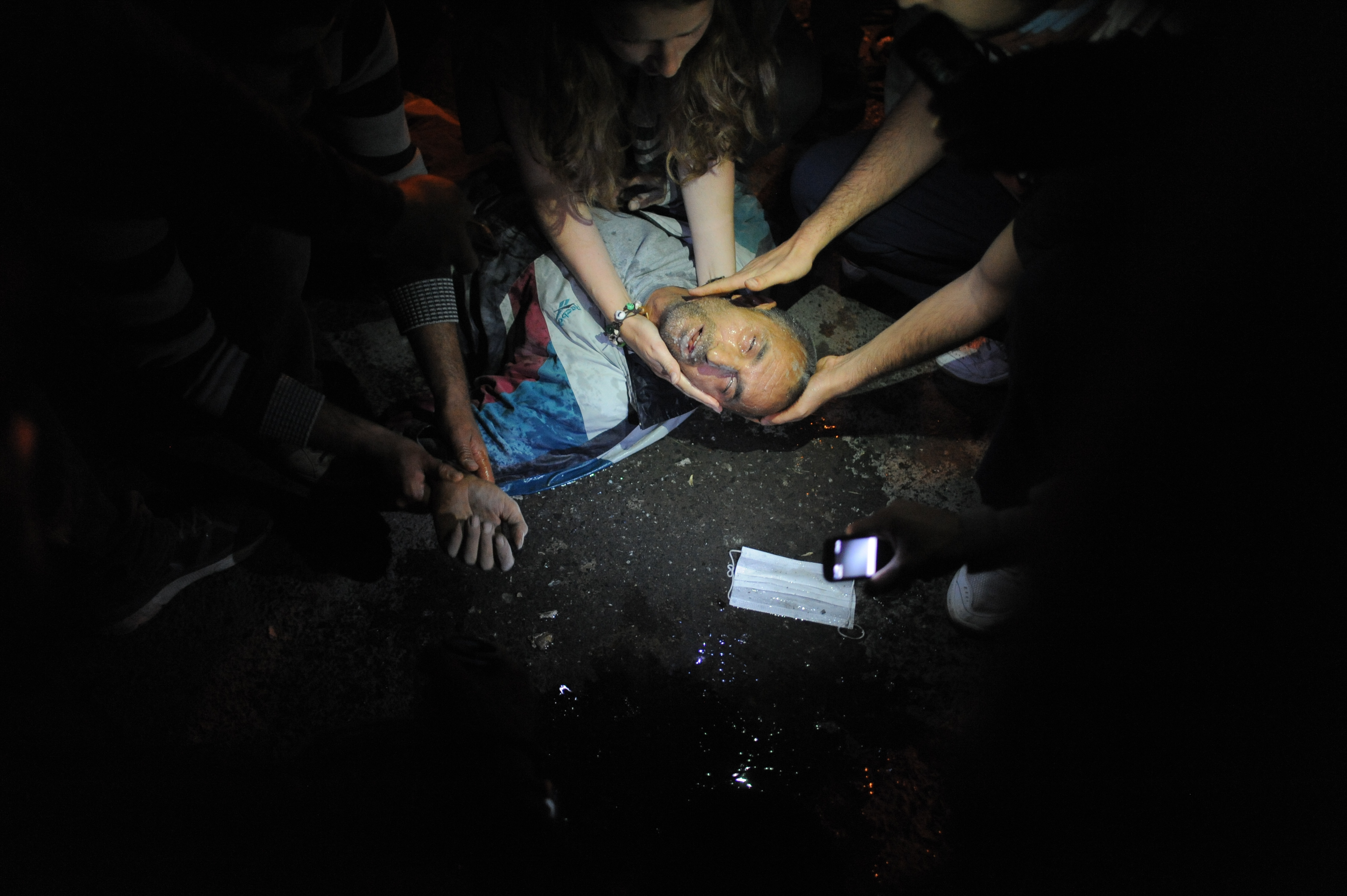
Civilians assist an injured man.

Metin Feyzioglu, the President of the Turkish Bar Association (TBB), reported that in Ankara's Kızılay, police had targeted an infirmary and used gas grenades against the doctors and patients inside.

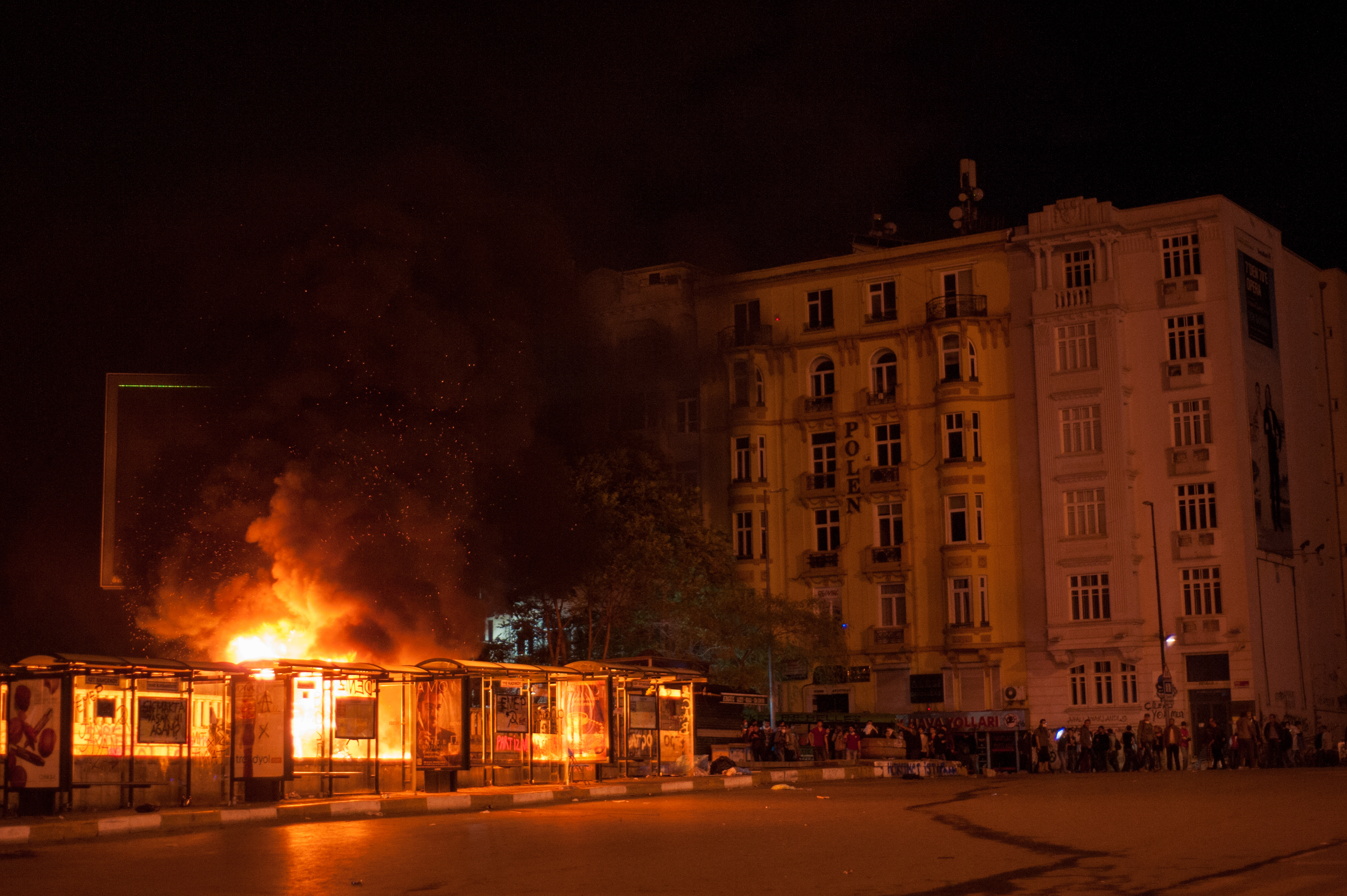
Objects set on fire near Taksim Square on 3 June 2013.

In the early hours of the day, several truck drivers escorted the protesters in order to shield them from police water cannons and tear gas in Beşiktaş. Protests got bigger in the afternoon as several unions called a general strike in response to "state terrorism." Several working protesters also joined the crowd after finishing work. Several protests were scheduled in the night in order to attract a larger turnout. Tens of thousands took to the streets in the afternoon in İzmir and Ankara.

In Ankara the offices of the newspaper Sol were ransacked by police, using tear gas and water cannon and manhandling three members of staff.

In Ankara police fired flash-bangs and gas grenades in an effort to chase protesters away from the central areas of the city. Police brought armored vehicles into the streets with tear gas canister-launchers.

Throughout the evening demonstrations were held in various neighborhoods of Istanbul. Violent clashes occurred mostly in Beşiktaş and around Taksim square. The Technical University's cafeteria in Beşiktaş was turned into a makeshift infirmary.

In the evening, the TV game show Kelime Oyunu ("Word Game"), on Bloomberg HT TV, hosted by Ali İhsan Varol, silently broke the media censorship and supported the protests by placing questions and answers (e.g. "gazmaskesi", gas masks) that refer to the protests.

Former Deputy Prime Minister of Turkey and a close friend of Erdoğan, Abdüllatif Şener, said on a live phone connection with Halk TV that he knows Erdogan very well and that if Erdogan builds a shopping mall, demolishing the Gezi Park, it would be full of malpractice that makes him only richer. With these words he declared his support for the protesters. He also stated that "running away is a typical behavior for Recep Tayyip Erdogan", upon hearing the news that Erdogan would be going on a 3-day journey abroad. Shortly after he made his speech, "Abdüllatif Şener" became a trending topic on Twitter.

Recep Tayyip Erdoğan left Turkey on a planned three-day tour of North African countries from 3 to 6 June.

The Confederation of Revolutionary Trade Unions of Turkey (DISK), the Confederation of Public Workers' Unions (KESK), and the Education and Science Workers' Union (Eğitim-Sen) announced a general strike in protest of "state terror."

A Facebook event named Black Monday (Kara Pazartesi) began on 3 June. More than 100,000 people wore black on 3 June 2013 as a sign of protest against the government. The event later surprisingly disappeared from Facebook.

Anonymous and RedHack began a cyber-campaign against the Turkish government, taking down several government websites including the presidential website

Stock market prices fell sharply during the early hours of the morning. The fall of the BIST 100 index was the sharpest since August 2011. Finance circles named the fall Black Monday.

== 4 June ==
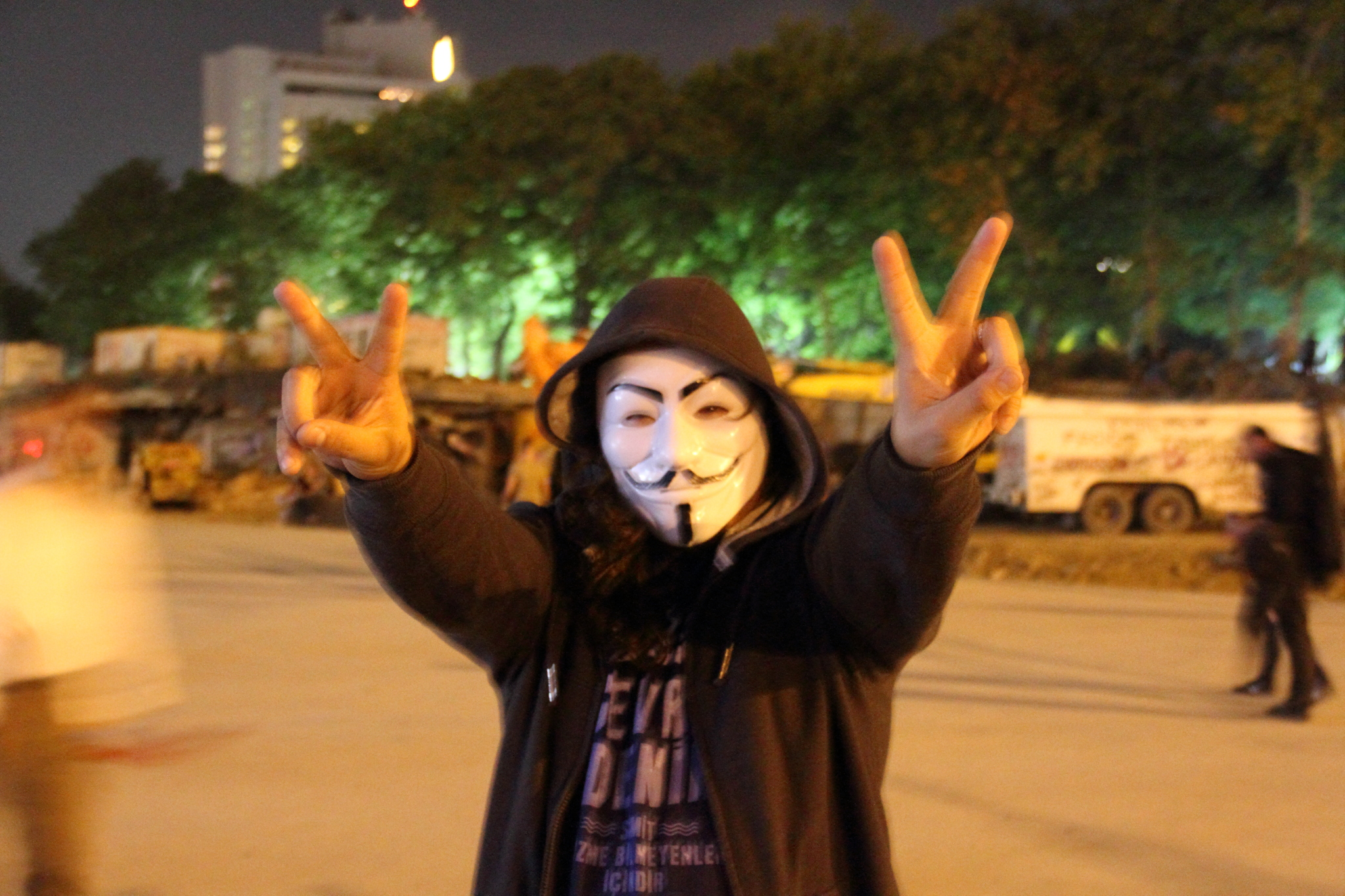
A protester wearing a Guy Fawkes mask.

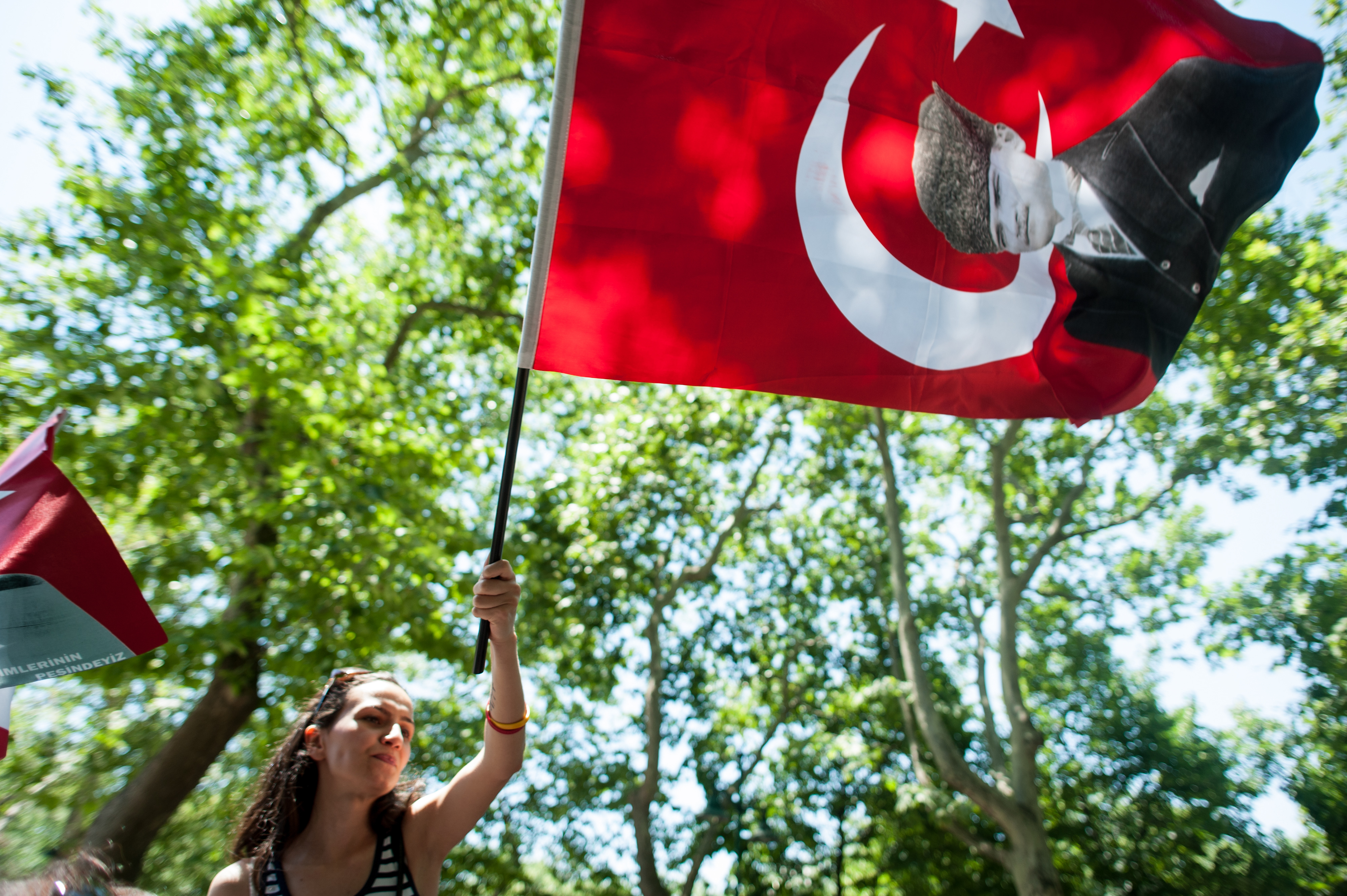
A woman waves a flag of Atatürk at Gezi Park.

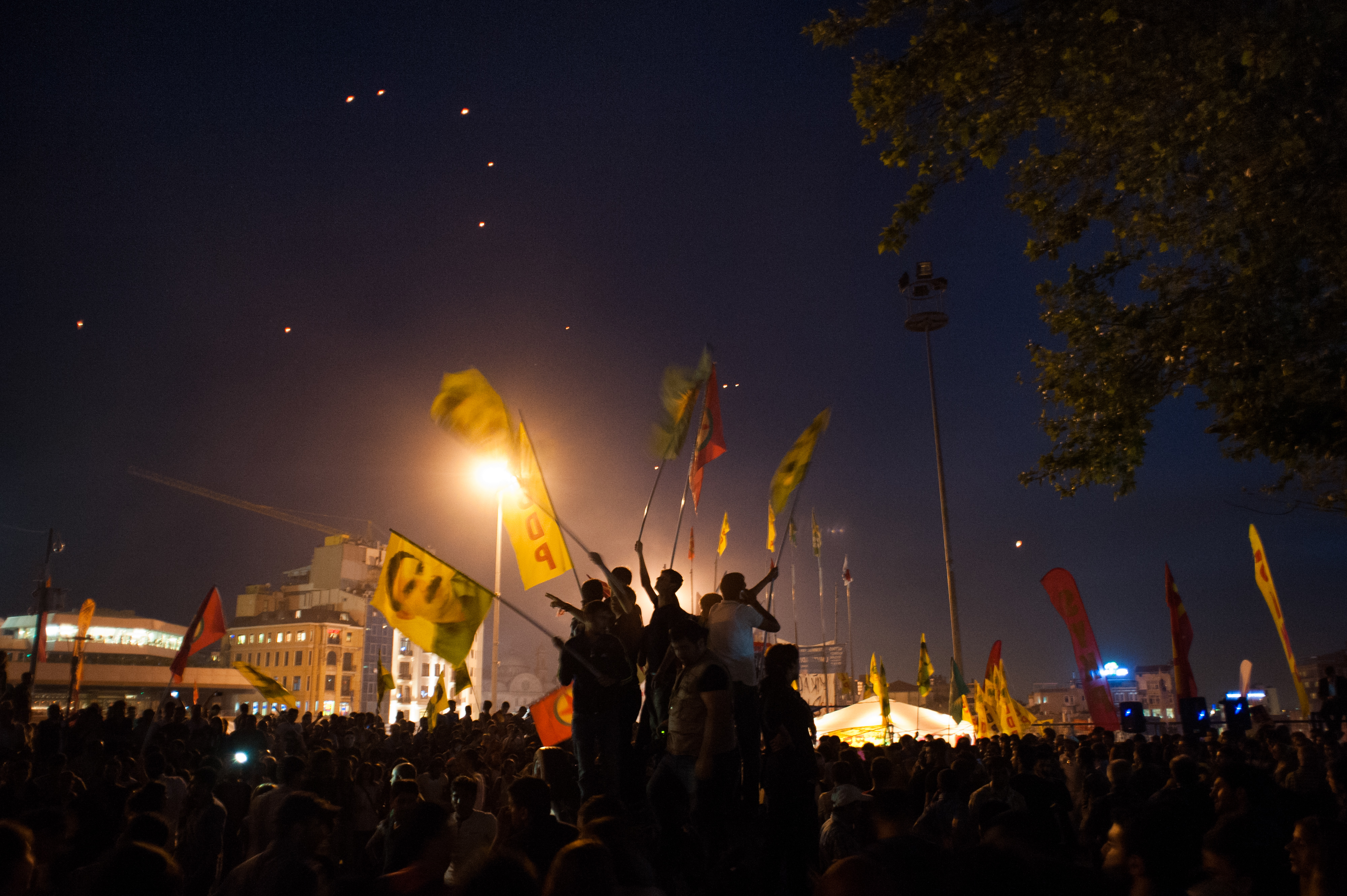
Protesters waving posters of Öcalan in the Square.

Clashes continued in Istanbul overnight, but police did not try to cross the Gezi Park barricades. In Dolmabahçe police fired teargas grenades at a wounded protester who was lying on the ground. Throughout the day, and increasing in the evening, different neighborhoods of Istanbul had seen large protests and violent encounters. In Beylikdüzü thousands of protesters blocked off main roads and marched on the local AKP headquarters. Police threw gas canisters at the protesters.

By evening there were again tens of thousands in Taksim Square; Al Jazeera reported that "there are many families with their children enjoying the demonstration that has developed the feeling of a festival." There were also signs of a developing infrastructure reminding some observers of Occupy Wall Street, with "a fully operational kitchen and first-aid clinic... carved out of an abandoned concession stand in the back of the park," complete with rotas and fundraising for people's travel expenses. A makeshift "protester library" was also created, and Şebnem Ferah gave a concert.

Local news reported that the CHP-controlled Antalya municipality was refusing to use its fire trucks to refill police water cannons, but that this was over-ruled by the national government-appointed Governor of Antalya Province.

Footage emerged of police officers smashing the windows of random apartments and praying tear gas and pepper spray through windows.

In the early morning thousands of schoolchildren in Ankara skipped school in order to march in protest of the government. Police cars followed them around, calling on the children to stop their 'illegal' demonstration and go back to school. Demonstrations grew during the afternoon, and early in the evening tens of thousands of protesters marched through Batıkent neighborhood. Thousands of demonstrators stayed near Kızılay well into the night, faced by riot police squads with multiple armored vehicles firing teargas, and water-cannon trucks.

Across the country in dozens of cities sit-in demonstrations were held in parks, squares, such as in Eskisehir, Rize, Trabzon and Tunceli. In other cities there were protests starting early in the evening.

In Tunceli, there is unconfirmed report of a young Kurdish person being shot in the head and killed.

Thousands took to the streets in Samsun late in the afternoon, marching towards the AKP building. Police threw up barricades and the protesters turned the march into a sit-in, blocking traffic through several streets. Demonstrations in Samsun went on into the night, opposite to the local AKP office.

In Antakya, demonstrations were triggered by the death of Abdullah Cömert. Tens of thousands of demonstrators took to the streets, carrying his coffin. Anger spilled over when police used teargas and water cannons to disperse the crowd. Barricades were set up and violent confrontations occurred after the police tried to move in on the protesters. The Turkish army was deployed in the streets of Antakya One protester got hit in the eye from a gas canister launched at short range and had to be hospitalized. Protests also got violent in Tunceli, with police deploying multiple armored vehicles in chases with demonstrators after they allegedly attacked a AKP office. A hospital in the city was reportedly teargassed, and there are reports of dozens of injuries. A local Human Rights observer was quoted as saying 'this place is now like Gaza'.

Clashes between protesters and riot police also occurred in Adana, with police in armored vehicles firing teargas into the crowds at Kasım Gülek Bridge. One police officer died after falling off of an underpass while chasing the protesters.

Anonymous hacked approximately 150 Turkish websites including some of the Turkish government and those of pro-AKP media.

In İzmir, 16 people were arrested for "encouraging people to revolt" via social media. One of those arrested was a teenage girl. According to her mother, she was being held behind bars without sunlight.

Iranian nationals (likely refugees) participating in the demonstrations were arrested across the country. According to pro-government media they were possibly spies working for the Iranian government.

On 4 June, Deputy Prime Minister Bülent Arınç, acting on behalf of Erdoğan, who was on an overseas trip, apologized to protesters for "excessive violence" used by the police in the beginning of the riots, but said he would not apologize for the police violence that came after.

== 5 June ==
It was reported that the "cyber crimes" police in İzmir conducted raids at 38 locations, arresting 24 people who are "accused of using Twitter to urge people to come to the protests." Anonymous hacked the email server of the prime ministerial website and released all usernames of the network, but without the passwords. At the same moment the Syrian Electronic Army managed to hack into the network of the Turkish minister of the Interior, and published email-accounts and password information. Nobel Prize winner Orhan Pamuk wrote an article about the protesters to be published at Süddeutsche Zeitung and The Guardian calling Prime Minister Erdogan oppressive and authoritarian.

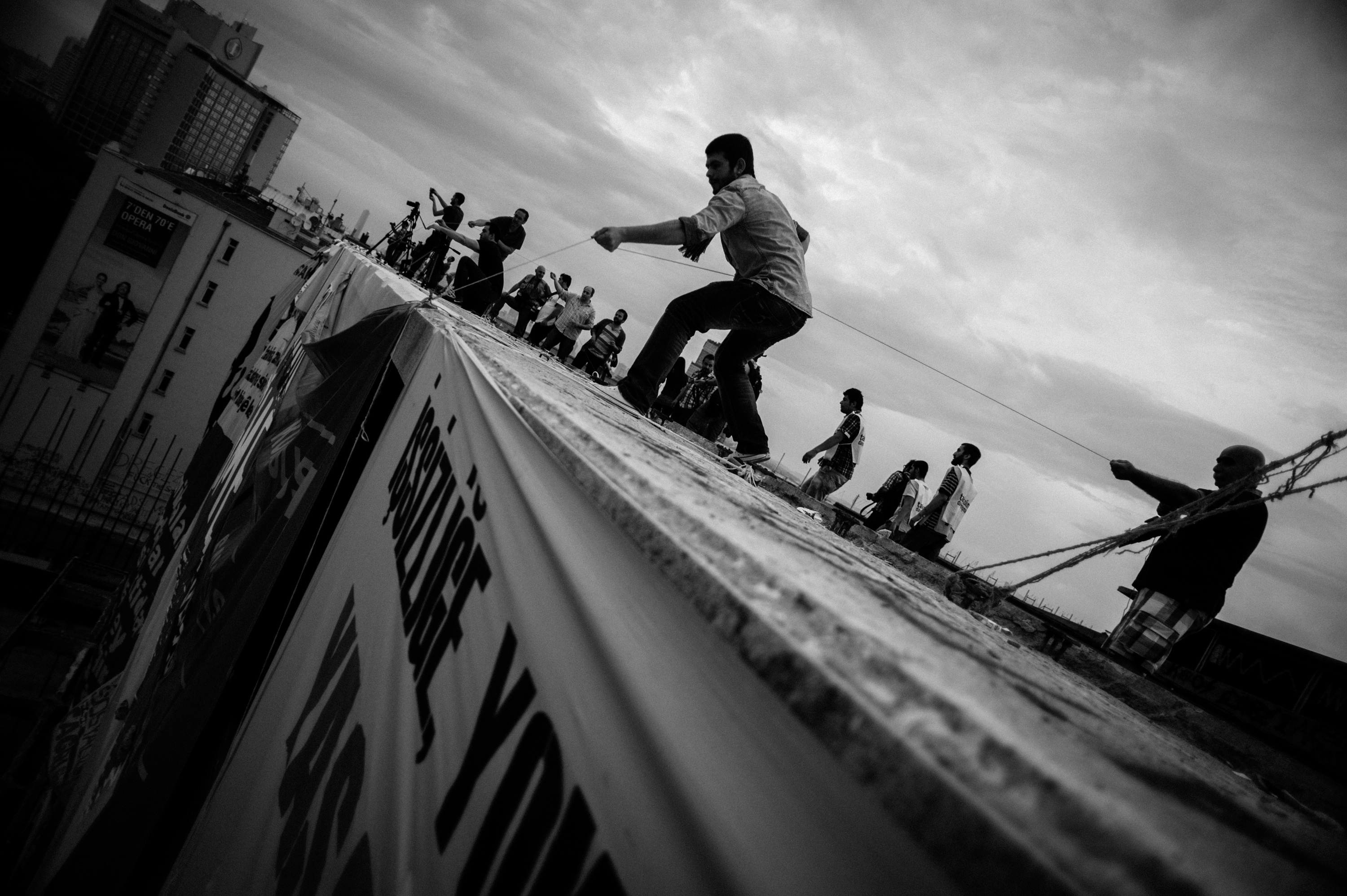
Protesters occupy buildings near Taksim Square on 5 June 2013.

From late in the morning several unions went on strike, among them municipal workers, teachers and lawyers. Marches and protests were being organized in Ankara, Istanbul, Bafra, Kocaeli, Antalya, Giresun, Hopa and Siirt among others. The number of protesters on Taksim square in evening was the highest of any since the demonstrations started, as Prime minister Erdogan is set to return to the country the next day.

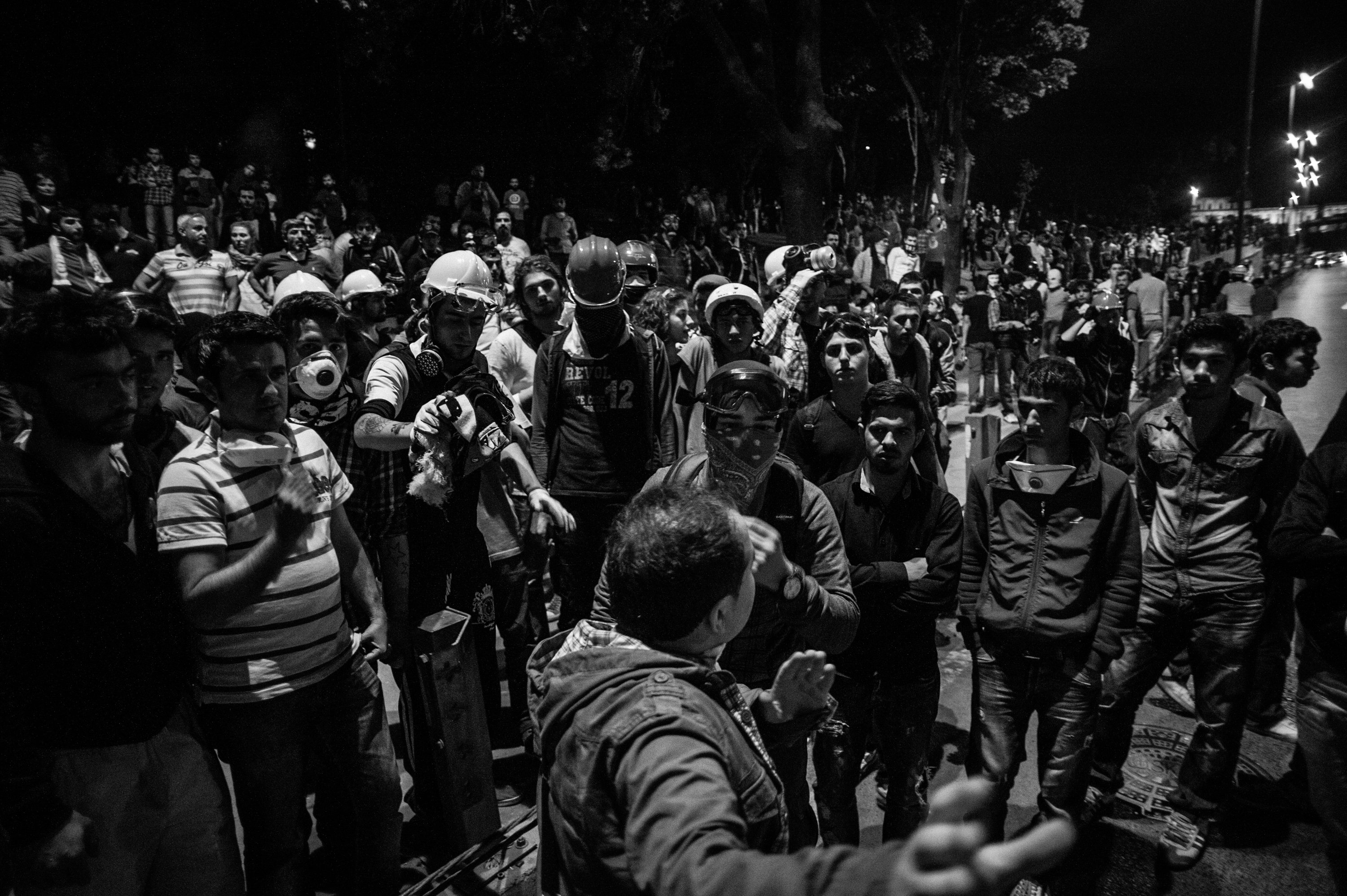
Protesters prepare to fight back against tear gas attacks in this picture from 5 June 2013.

Around 10,000 strikers gathered in Kızılay square during the afternoon. Later in the afternoon, the protests turned violent after police tried to break up the demonstration with teargas grenades and water-cannons. Reportedly some persons were wounded in the clashes. Throughout the evening protests were held in different neighborhoods of Ankara, mostly in the form of peaceful marches, sometimes clashing with riot police using water-cannons and teargas. In Ankara an Ulusal Kanal cameraman, Serkan Bayraktar, and an Ulusal Kanal representative, Mustafa Kaya, were arrested. In Rize (where Erdogan's family originates from) AKP voters attacked protesters, injuring several people. After dozens of AKP attackers violently stamped on the body of one of the female students the police stepped in and let the demonstrators escape to a nearby shop, while the violent crowd remained in front of the shop, shouting slogans. When an ambulance arrived to take the woman away, the demonstrators left the building upon which the AKP supporters again attacked them. According to the AKP mayor of Rize the attackers were an 'unknown group'.

In wake of the escalating nationwide unrest, one diplomat close to the administration anonymously stated to the press that "The main concern for the moment is that the prime minister should hold his silence" and "Whatever he says seems to stir feelings" in reference to the intended absence from the country.

In Antakya in the evening thousands held a candle-lit march and had a ceremony in the central square with musical performances in commemoration of Abdullah Cömert.

== 6 June ==
Thousand of protesters remained in Taksim into the night. Because it was an Islamic holy night, protesters did not expect confrontations with the police. For the first night in the demonstrations, no conflicts occurred downhill towards Beşiktaş. All but one of those arrested the previous night for sending out certain Twitter messages were released.

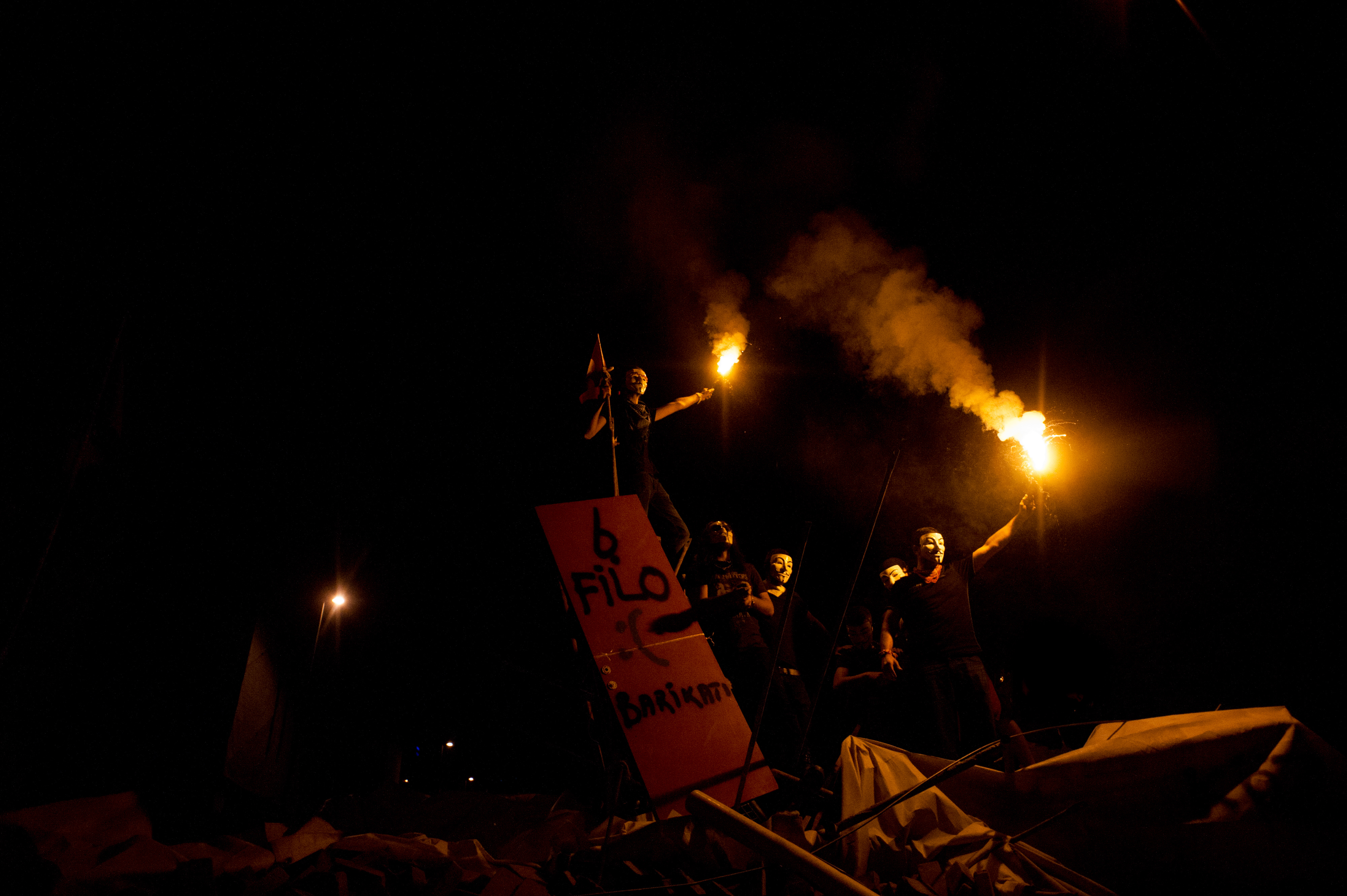
Barricades remain at the site.

Erdoğan dismissed the protests as undemocratic and manipulated by extremists, and that the protesters included "extremists, some of them implicated in terrorism." He said the redevelopment plans would go ahead. Shortly after the comments were broadcast, the Turkish stock markets fell 5%.

As Erdoğan returned in the evening from his foreign tour, the AKP ran a SMS campaign and organized buses to gather thousands of supporters at Atatürk Airport, assisted by the AKP-run Istanbul Municipality extending the Istanbul Metro opening hours until 4 am. This however did stand in contrast to the statements of the deputy AKP chairman, Huseyin Celik, urging supporters not to do so and that the prime minister "did not need a show of support". BBC reporter Jeremy Bowen noted that "there are cracks emerging within his own party". The crowd of around 10 000 people chanted "We will die for you, Erdogan", "Let's go crush them all" and "Let us go, let's crush Taksim."

== 7 June ==
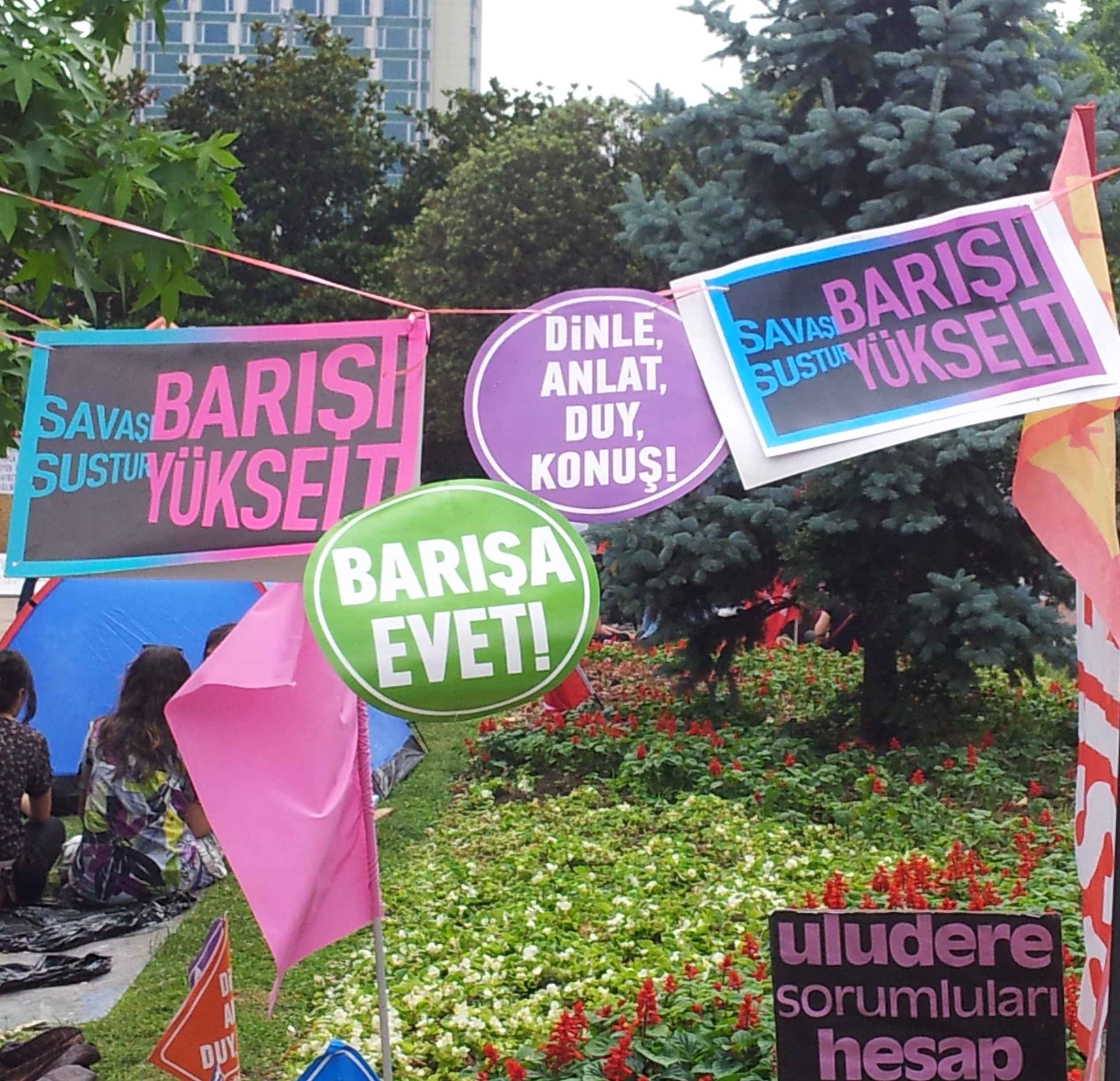
A few banners regarding support to the solution process and asking for a just verdict for the Uludere massacre hanging at Gezi Park during the protests.

The AKP party director for the Iğdır Province, Mehmet Soyuk, resigned in protest. A group calling themselves "Anti-capitalist Muslims" prayed in Gezi Park in honor of Abdullah Cömert and the police captain Mustafa Sari

== 8 June ==
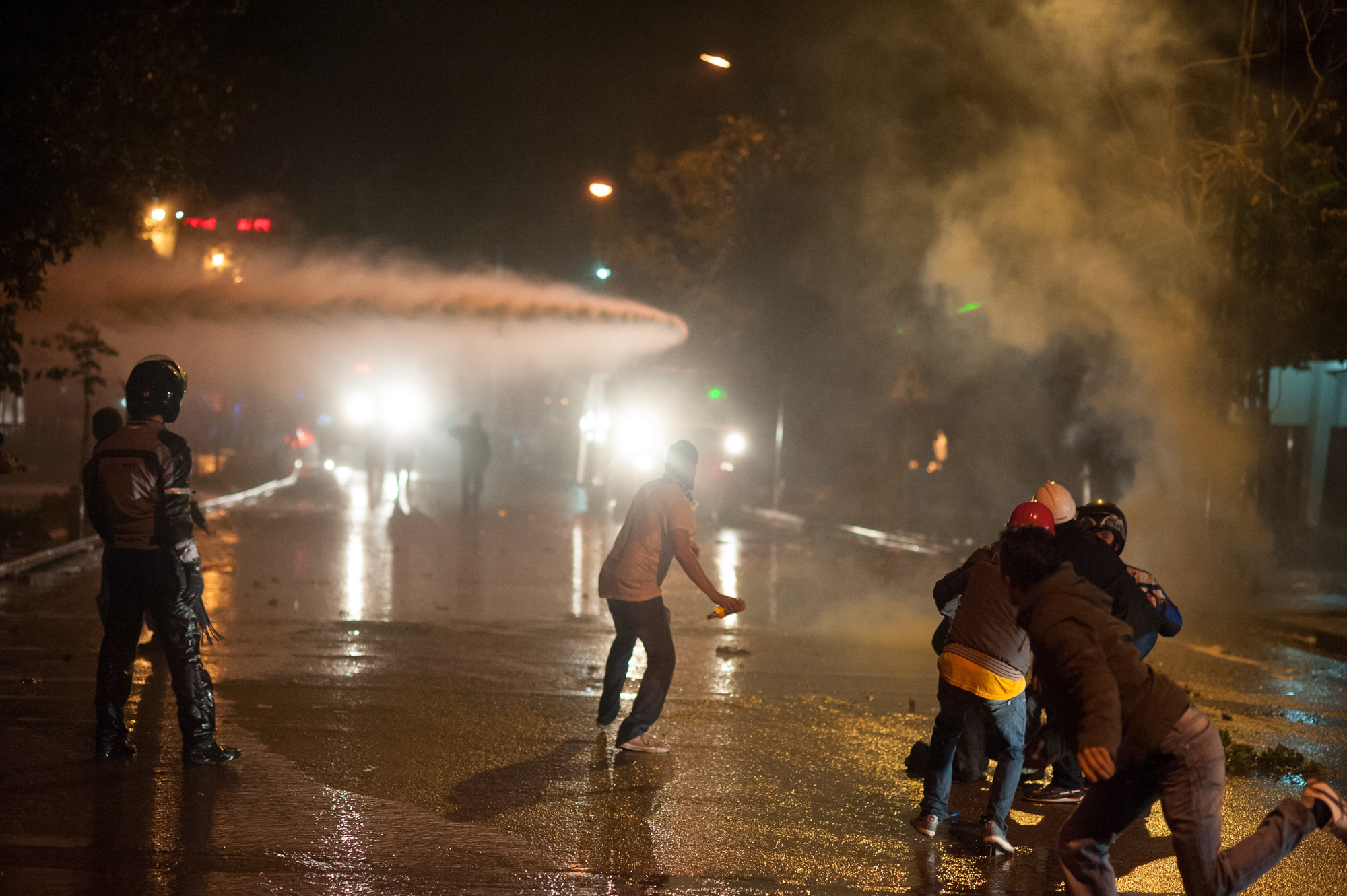
Police in Ankara clash with protesters on the night of 7–8 June 2013

Protests continue on Taksim square with support of major İstanbul football clubs' supporters. They collaborated to put flares on the top of the Atatürk Cultural Center.

The AKP decided to hold two "unity and solidarity" rallies, in Ankara on 15 June and Istanbul on 16 June. Erdoğan said "We don't do what a few looters did. They set things on fire and destroy. That's the definition of looter (çapulcu)."

An article published in Reuters reported that "Sources close to the AKP speak of a sense of siege within the party leadership, with influential if disparate forces loath to break ranks publicly but still worried about the extent of Erdogan's power and his uncompromising response to the protests."

A private AKP executive meeting that took over 4 hours was held and numerous scenarios including calling a snap election, delaying Erdogan's presidential bid by changing AKP by-laws that prevent Erdogan from running for a fourth term as prime minister and potential further social media censorship are understood to have been discussed. Following the meeting he publicly reaffirmed that he would not step down and refused to call a snap election as a bid in breaking the deadlock, in turn uncompromisingly issuing a challenge to his political opponents to out-poll his party in the March 2014 municipal elections.

== 9 June ==
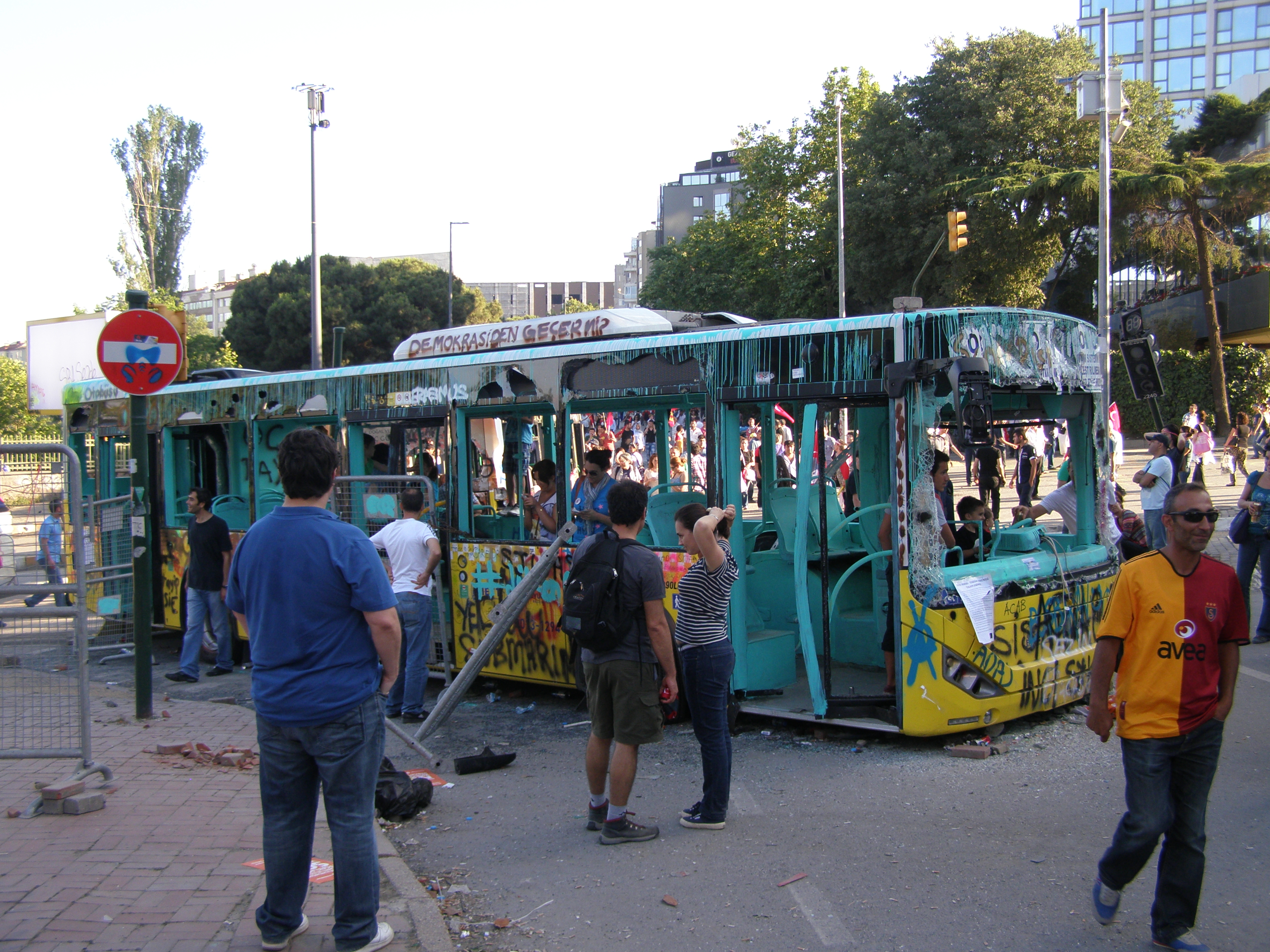
A damaged public bus being used as a barricade

Erdogan said in a speech in Adana that "even patience has a limit" and rallied pro-government supporters. AKP sympathizers were seen to be throwing stones at anti-government protesters.

According to the police union Emniyet-Sen head Faruk Sezer, so far at least 6 policemen have committed suicide in Istanbul due to extraordinarily harsh working standards as a condition of their employment. He was quoted as saying "The violence you see at the end is the reflection of the violence suffered by the policemen. They are not just subjected to violence by protesters, but by 120-hour consecutive working periods, stale bread and food. The police are already subjected to violence within the establishment." Whilst the police department accepted the suicides had happened, it denied any link with the protests despite the fact that all had occurred within the past two weeks.

== 10 June ==
The leader of the main opposition Republican People's Party (CHP), Kemal Kilicdaroglu, accused Erdogan of deliberately escalating tensions and dragging Turkey "into the fire."

Rating's agency Moody's warned Turkey that ongoing protests would result in significant credit risks.

Actor Memet Ali Alabora stated that he was being threatened due to his support for the demonstrations at Gezi Park, after Yeni Şafak had claimed he was part of a plot to overthrow the government, citing his directing the play Mi Minör, which centers on the government of the fictional country Pinima "forbidding the musical note Mi."

Deputy Prime Minister Arinc stated that Erdogan had agreed to meet protest organisers on Wednesday 13 June. He also warned the government would "no longer tolerate 'illegal acts', and implied that the occupation of Taksim and its accompanying Gezi Park would be over by the weekend."

The President, Abdullah Gul, formally approved of the controversial bill that restricted sales of alcohol between 10 pm and 6 am despite it largely being seen as one of the final straws in the outrage of protesters regarding unprecedented government intervention in their lifestyle and 'creeping Islamisation'.

== 11 June ==
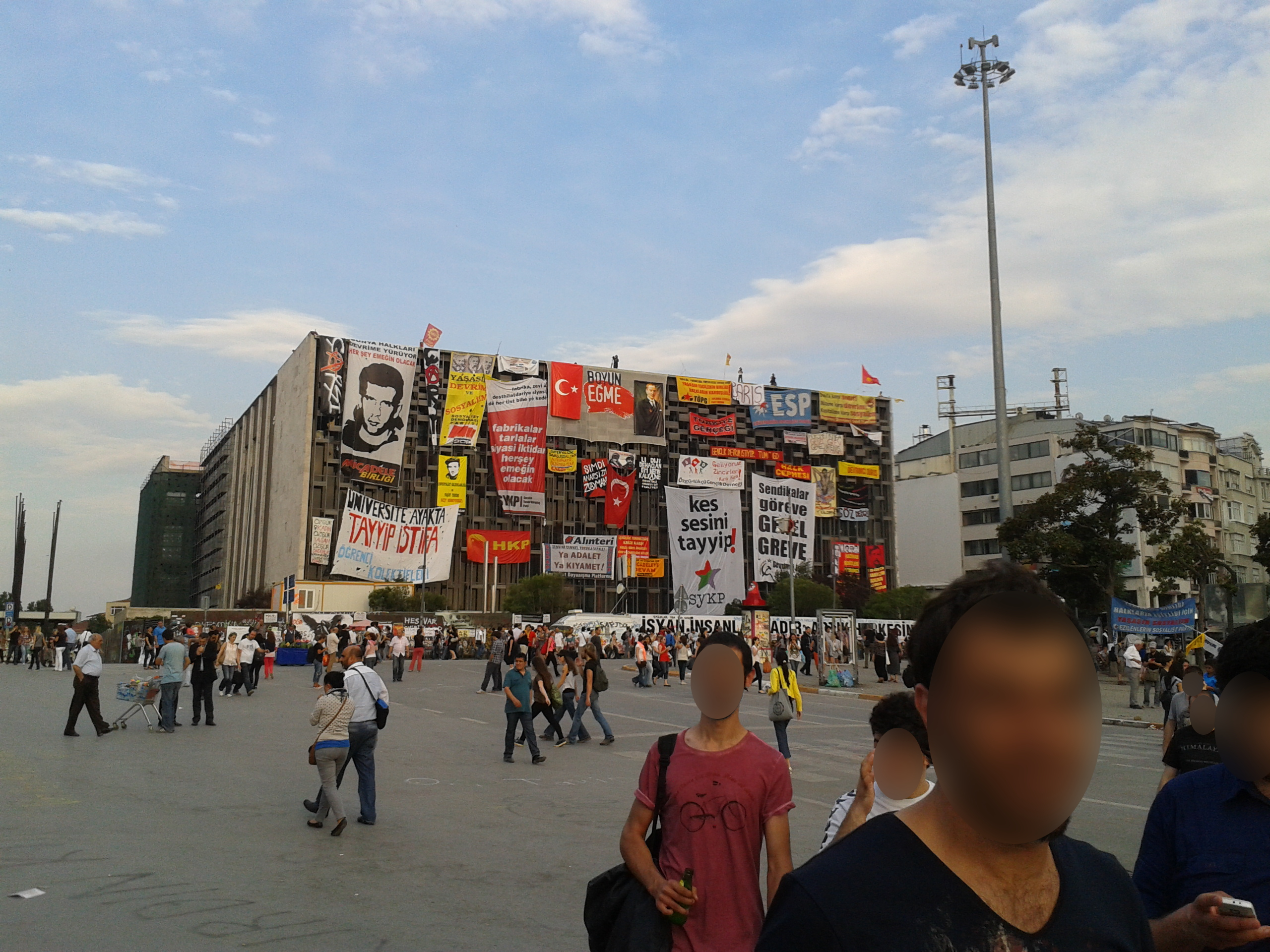
Posters, banners and flags on Atatürk Cultural Center (AKM) on 7 June

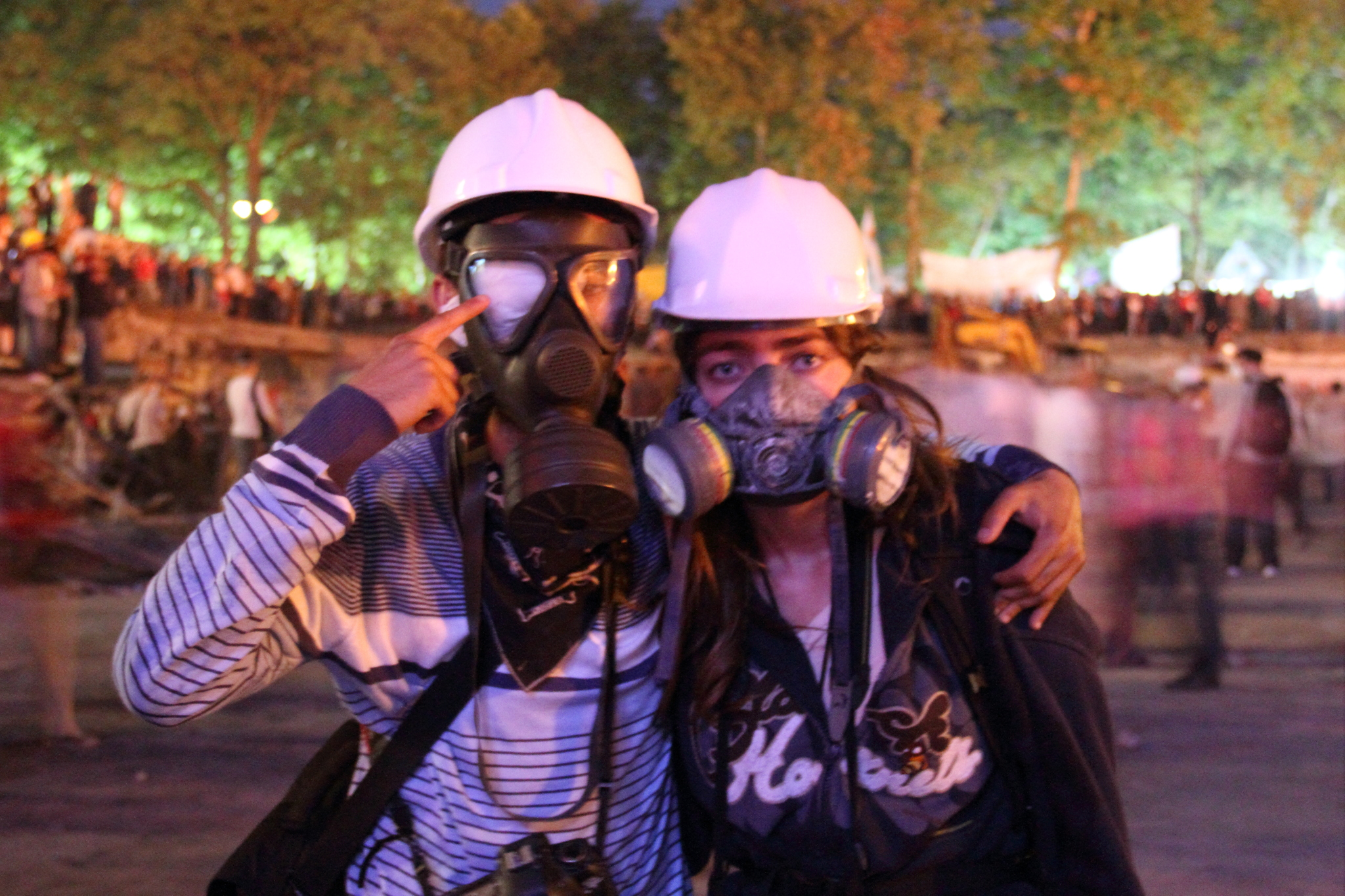
A wounded protester shows his eye.

Police had left the square since 1 June, but around 4 am, barricades built by protesters in Taksim Square were broken by the police force and hundreds of policemen again entered to expel civilians by continuing to fire tear gas with at least two people so far being critically injured. Police began retaking part of the square around 7:30 am, using an unprecedented force of tear gas, rubber bullets and water cannons, causing most protesters to retreat to Gezi Park. The Governor's office said the aim was to "clear banners from the Atatürk Cultural Center and the statue of Atatürk". Around 2pm riot police entered Gezi Park, leaving after around 10 minutes. The Turkish Medical Association said that there had been hundreds of injuries during the day's events, including tens of people with head traumas from tear gas capsules, and five critically injured. Erdogan praised the police operation; Istanbul Governor Mutlu said the square would be cleared of "marginal elements".

During the retake attempt of police, several people were seen throwing molotov cocktails as protesters were building a buffer zone between Gezi Park and the police heading for the Atatürk Cultural Center. Protesters said they did not recognise these people. Later The Istanbul Governor declared that the molotov-cocktail throwers used prominent banners of the Socialist Democracy Party (SDP), but the SDP leadership denied that they were members. Photographs suggested some of the molotov throwers were wearing the same sophisticated gas masks worn by the police. The Guardians Luke Harding observed that "their attempts are suspiciously theatrical and inept – with the 'demonstrators' at one point advancing in a hopeless Roman-style assault.", adding that "The 'protesters' were in fact middle-aged undercover police officers, staging a not very plausible 'attack' on their own for the benefit of the cameras."

A break-in at a Fenerbahce football supporters' club saw computers stolen, but other offices in the building untouched.

An AKP spokesman said that Erdogan would only meet those tomorrow that were involved in a "legal protest" and refused to invite members of the Taksim Solidarity Platform that had previously met with Arinc. Erdogan again issued a speech ordering all civilians to withdraw from the streets.

At least 20 lawyers gathering at the Istanbul Justice Palace to make a press statement about Gezi Park were detained by police, including riot police. The arrests were described as "very brutal" by one lawyer present, with many injured: "They even kicked their heads, the lawyers were on the ground. They were hitting us they were pushing. They built a circle around us and then they attacked."

At around 8.20pm police renewed tear gas and water cannon attacks on the tens of thousands who had gathered in Taksim Square. A van for boosting mobile phone reception was seen on fire. Protesters have made great use of mobile phones to use Twitter and other social media.

A Turkish security official said that the police had used as much tear gas in the first three days of the protests as they normally used in a year.

== 12 June ==
Clashes continued between police and thousands of demonstrators in Taksim Square despite Erdogan's vow just yesterday that he would show 'no more tolerance' for the ongoing protests. Gezi Park protesters gave first aid to a police officer hit by falling wood.

The Radio and Television Supreme Council (RTÜK) fined a number of channels, including Halk TV, Ulusal TV, Cem TV and EM TV; for "harming the physical, moral and mental development of children and young people" by broadcasting coverage of the Gezi Park protests. Anonymous hacked RTÜK's website in response.

Over 2,000 lawyers in Istanbul (and more in Ankara and İzmir) protested the detentions of lawyers the previous day.

Two Canadian Broadcasting Corporation reporters were detained, with the Canadian Foreign Minister voicing concern; they were released a few hours later. Reporters without Borders said journalists were being scapegoated by both sides, reporting further injuries to journalists on 11 June.

The state-owned Anadolu Agency provided extensive reporting of protests in London over the G8, and attempted to create a Twitter campaign around the hashtag #occupylondon, which was picked up by AKP supporters.

In the evening a concert was held in Taksim Square to an audience of thousands, centered around a 14-hour-long piano recital on a grand piano brought Davide Martello, a German pianist on a world tour, on a piano he had built himself. The evening proceeded peacefully without police intervention, though the following day the police confiscated the piano.

== 14 June ==
The government, after Erdogan met with representatives of the protesters, said it would respect court rulings halting the Gezi Park project.

The Ministry of Health asked the Istanbul Medical Chamber about its organisation of first aid during the protests.

== 15 June ==
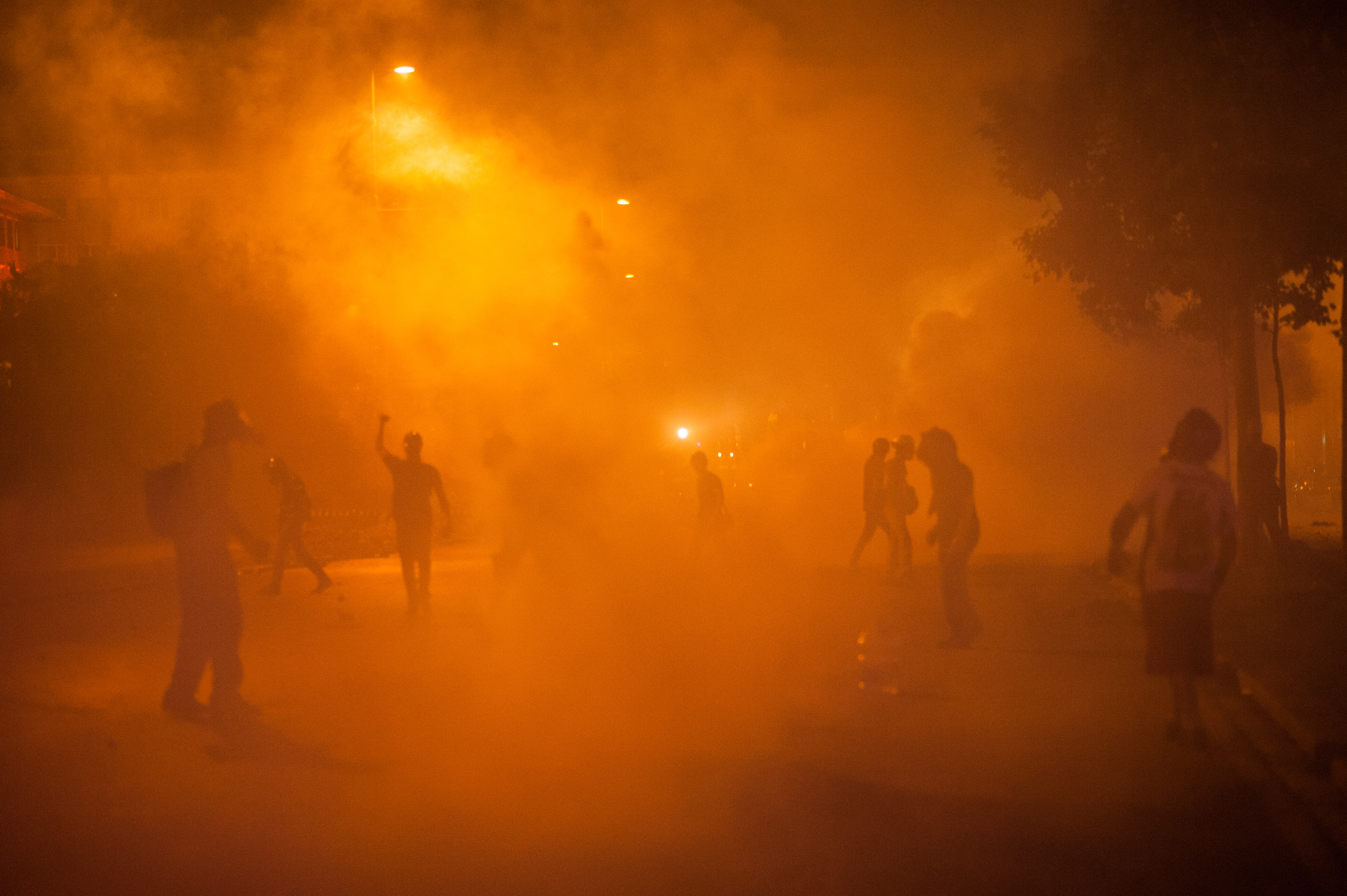
Tear gas action during Gezi Park protests. Events of 15 June 2013

1000 additional riot police were flown in, from as far away as Diyarbakir in south-east Turkey, and the Turkish Gendarmerie was called in to provide additional water cannons and personnel.

In the evening, police moved into Gezi Park, clearing it. One witness said "There was a concert by a well-known musician with hundreds of people and families in a festival atmosphere in the square and then suddenly from all sides the police came with water cannon and teargas." Police attempted to break the doors of the nearby Divan Hotel Istanbul, being used as a first aid center by protesters, and repeatedly fired tear gas inside. Claudia Roth, a German Green Party politician and one of the two current party chairs, was in the Divan Istanbul hotel, and was a victim of the tear gas. Roth said "This is like war. Chasing people through the streets and cheer targeted with tear gas grenades at the people." CHP leader Kemal Kılıçdaroğlu described the operation as "a crime against humanity". Ramis Topal, a Member of Parliament for Amasya, said that his nose was broken as he was standing by people who escaped to the entrance of the Divan Hotel. He reported that a policeman threw a helmet right into his face by aiming.

European Union minister Egemen Bağış said after the park and square had been cleared that everyone entering Taksim Square would be treated as a terrorist.

Police used tear gas against a crowd who tried to cross the Bosphorus Bridge late at night.

A group of deputies from the main opposition Republican People's Party (CHP) staged a sit-in to prevent a police intervention against thousands of protesters gathered in Ankara.

The Istanbul Doctors Association said that there was "a high but an unknown number of first and second-degree burn injuries because of some substance mixed in pressurized water cannons";Corriere della Sera reported that police had added Jenix Pepper Spray to the TOMA water cannons.

== 16 June ==
The police cordoned off the Taksim Square. It was reported that no one was allowed to enter the Square and the Park. It was reported that the trees in the Gezi Park were being pulled out by workers from Istanbul municipality.

In Ankara, Hurriyet Daily News reported that "The police have begun to use water cannons and tear gas against journalists and people around the journalists as well." The funeral of Ethem Sarısülük, who was reported dead the day after he was shot in the head by a police officer in Ankara, was blocked by Turkish police. The police surrounded the hearse. His family, friends, lawyers and his fellow protesters prepared to lay Ethem Sarısülük, following a commemoration gathering at Ankara's Kızılay Square. The planned gathering at Kızılay aimed to commemorate Sarısülük at the exact place where he was allegedly shot by a police officer, with people wishing to leave red carnations at the site. However, the riots in Ankara are still ongoing, and the police is using tear gas and water cannons against the people.

Some sources said that AKP supporters were working alongside the police to beat protesters. A group of 35–40 people armed with sticks attacked the CHP branch building in Şişhane, breaking windows. Some protesters had taken refuge in the building. Also, the police detained doctors in their white coats inside the Ramada Hotel, where they were treating the injured protesters. Also members of Çarşı, the notorious hardcore fans of Istanbul's Beşiktaş club, have been detained in their homes. Berkin Elvan, a 14-year-old kid, was shot in the head during protests by a police officer in Okmeydanı, İstanbul. He was seriously injured and rushed to the hospital immediately. Doctors reported that his skull was fractured by a gas shell and suffering from a brain hemorrhage. He was in a critical condition.

The Turkish Bars Association said it was appealing to the Council of Europe to use Article 52 of the European Convention on Human Rights to ask Turkey to explain the excessive use of force in suppressing the protests. Five unions, including KESK, DISK, the Union of Chambers of Turkish Engineers and Architects and the Turkish Doctors' Association, called a one-day strike for 17 June. Interior minister Muammer Güler warned of "consequences" for a strike he called illegal. Deputy Prime Minister Bülent Arınç said that if necessary the army would be called in to stop the protests.

The AKP organised a rally in Istanbul, addressed by Erdogan, while preventing the demonstration planned for Taksim: "Protest organisers had called for a million-strong demonstration at Taksim Square, but the entire area was cordoned off, making access impossible. Stretches of the motorways encircling Istanbul were also closed by police to try to prevent protesters getting to the city center. The opposite conditions applied to government supporters making their way en masse to hear the prime minister. The Istanbul municipality and the AKP laid on buses and other transport to help boost the numbers attending." At the rally Erdogan accused the BBC, CNN and Reuters of "fabricating" news, and linked the Gezi Park protests to a recent bomb attack in Reyhanli: "I wonder what these foreigners who came to Taksim Square from all corners of the world were doing... We have seen the same plots in Reyhanli." The AKP hired municipal buses and ferries to bring supporters to the ferry; the Istanbul Municipality later published some invoices, including one for nearly TL200,000.

== 17 June ==
Police used violence in Istanbul, preventing people from entering Gezi Park and Taksim Square. Besides all the people, even some journalists were victims for random police brutality and violence usage.

Government officials said that the park could now be used publicly after the violent storm-out that took place on 15 June. But since the storm-out, nobody could have entered the park and main square except the police. And before the storm-out the park and square were in public use. This speech was criticised on social media for being illogical.

Tens of thousands gathered, walked and protested mostly in Istanbul, Ankara, İzmir, Antalya, Mersin, Sinop, Kocaeli, Sakarya, Samsun, Niğde, Manisa, Antakya, Tunceli, Sivas and Eskişehir, including thousands of workers from all classes, who had declared a general strike. These protests and the strike continued throughout the day.

In the evening, Beşiktaş J.K.'s fan group Çarşı announced that the Abbasağa Park in Beşiktaş, was the new Gezi Park until the latter is open for public use again. Thousands gathered there to protested.

#duranadam

A new type of protest was started by a man called Erdem Gündüz who is a choreographer. At about 19:00, he put his bag on his feet and started staring at the Turkish flags and Atatürk poster that had been put on the Atatürk Cultural Center (AKM). He remained in this pose, immobile and with his hands in his pockets, for several hours. At about 23:00, people started noticing him and after photos had been posted online, millions started supporting him. The hashtags #duranadam ("The Standing Man") and #direnduranadam ("Resisting Standing Man") were used and quickly became World Trending Topics. Hundreds of people who had organised on Twitter gathered on Taksim, to stand alongside The Standing Man. Also people from several cities like Ankara, İzmir, Zonguldak, Eskişehir, Adana, Antakya, etc. started to imitate his protest: In Ankara, a woman stood on the place where police had shot Ethem Sarısülük. For her, the hashtag #durankadin ("The Standing Woman") was used. In Antakya, a man stood on the place where Abdullah Cömert was shot by police. Some celebrities stood in different parts of Istanbul. In Taksim, Hundreds held hands and formed a circle around the original Standing Man. Journalist Levent Üzümcü wrote on Twitter that, if the government attacks man who is merely standing, then it's pathologically ill.

Shortly after police ordered the hundreds that had gathered to leave the area and gave them 20 minutes to go home. They warned that otherwise there would be an attack. However people remained on the square. Halk TV, Ulusal Kanal and +1 TV, broadcast the warnings and the standing protests live. Even though the crowd did not leave, The Standing Man finished standing at 02:06. He said that he needed to leave because the police was going to once again attack people who were merely standing. A man continued to stand in Beşiktaş, near Abbasağa Park and Beşiktaş Bazaar until morning. In the morning, it has been reported that some standing men have been taken in custody by police.

== 18 June ==
Standing protests took place in every part of Turkey, starting from the police-blockaded Taksim Square (in front of the AKM building, where the Standing Man Erdem Gündüz first started), especially including some specific spots like the place where Ethem Sarısülük was shot in Ankara, Abdullah Cömert was shot in Antakya, Mehmet Ayvalıtaş was shot in Istanbul, police officer Mustafa Sarı fell off a bridge in Adana, Trojan Horse in Çanakkale, the Madımak Hotel in Sivas (where the Sivas massacre happened in 1993), in front of the headquarters of Doğuş Media Group, owned by Ferit Şahenk (most of the channels and newspapers that the world reacted against their censored and sided media rule attached to this group), the place where Hrant Dink was shot in Şişli, Istanbul, etc.

Standing protests took place even in the most religious parts of Turkey, for example the city center of Konya, etc.

Beginning from the first day, standing and stopping protests also spread worldwide, supporting the act from many countries, mostly from specific points like the Leaning Tower of Pisa, Kölner Dom, Times Square, etc.

The government supporting-newspaper Takvim made a fake story and put it on its headline, telling that the Takvim journalist Mevlüt Yüksel made an interview with CNN journalist Christiane Amanpour and she told that CNN made all those live protest broadcasts for money. Inside the paper, Takvim put on a little note to a page telling that they made a fake story to give CNN a lesson and they confessed that the interview of Mevlüt Yüksel is not real. These events were much criticised on social media. And Amanpour tweeted "Shame on you Takvim for making a fake headline interview with me!", foreign reporters evaluated the news as a new example to the sided and censored Turkish media.

A journalist working on the government-supporting newspaper Sabah, named Alper Bahçekapılı, stood in front of the headquarters of the newspaper for six hours and then resigned. He received much support from social media.

Nationwide protests continued throughout the day.

== 19–20 June ==
The Turkish National Police announced an unplanned tender for 100,000 tear gas cartridges and 60 water cannon vehicles.

The Mayor of Istanbul said that in future all major projects in the city would have public consultation. He also said seven municipal employees were suspended, as they were accused of burning protesters' tents on 30 May.

It was announced on 20 June that if a court ruled in favor of the Gezi Park redevelopment, there would be a referendum, in which all residents of Greater Istanbul would participate. Given strong AKP support in some of Istanbul's suburbs, a referendum on this scale, rather than in the local Beyoglu district, is much more likely to endorse the redevelopment.

== 22–23 June ==
Protesters gathered in Taksim Square to pay their respects those who lost their lives during protests. Thousands threw and gave carnations to the police. But soon after, the police attacked with water cannons and tear gas. Protesters chanted "Police do not betray your people", "Police! Sell simit and live honourably", "Nothing will be thrown to the police." Struggle continued until dawn in the streets of Beyoğlu, Istanbul and also Ankara.

Riot police's violent attack on thousands who just gave carnations to them and called for brotherhood, led tens of thousands to big mass demonstrations again in every part of the country. Police continued to use violence on the people.

== 29 June ==
Big mass demonstrations were repeated again in Taksim Square, Istanbul and also in Güvenpark and Dikmen in Ankara. Protesters demonstrated because of the release of police officer Ahmet Şahbaz who shot Ethem Sarısuluk in the head to death. The events going on in Lice, Diyarbakır were also protested. The events were protested in Cizre, Şırnak too. Riot police suppressed the protesters partially with plastic bullets and some tear gas bombs. Some protesters were detained. There was also a big police intervention in Ankara.

== 30 June ==
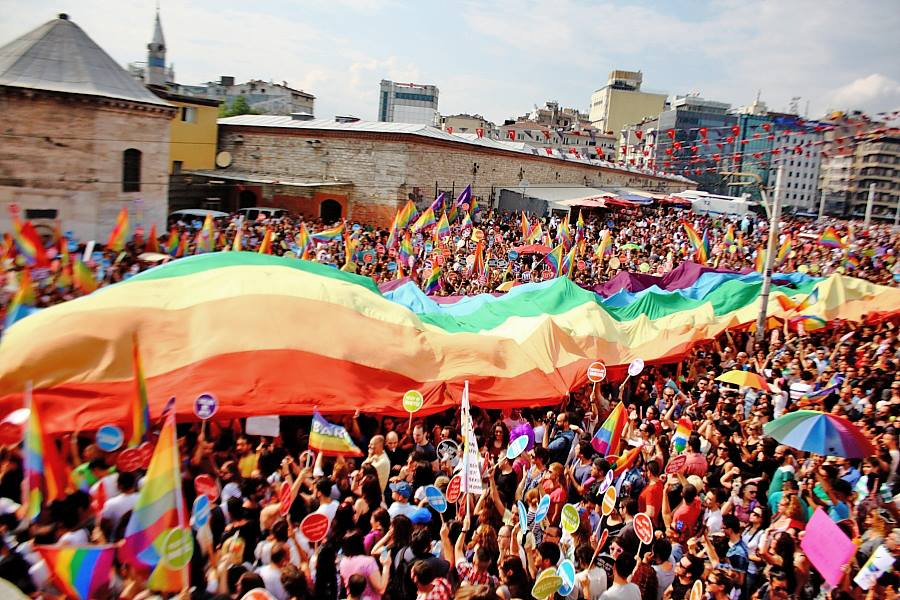
Istanbul Pride (Taksim Square), 2013.

Two major protests are held in Istanbul. Firstly, the Istanbul pride parade attracted almost 100.000 people. The protesters were joined by Gezi Park protesters, making the 2013 Istanbul Pride the biggest pride ever held in Turkey and eastern Europe. The European Union praised Turkey that the parade went ahead without disruption. Secondly, Thousands of Fenerbahce fans, with the support of Gezi Protesters and other football teams' fans, held a massive march through the Kadıköy district to protest UEFA decision and government attitude against Fenerbahçe and Beşiktaş football teams.

The Minister of Agriculture, Mehdi Eker, and Istanbul governor Hüseyin Avni Mutlu are catcalled by hundreds of the audience at a horse race.

Protests continue elsewhere Turkey. In Mersin, police attack hundreds of protesters and protesters retaliate with stones. There are reports of wounded people.

After Erdoğan's speech, 10 to 20 supporters attack hundreds of unarmed protesters in the public forum in Yoğurtçu Park, Kadıkoy with knives and sticks, wounding two protesters.

== 2 July ==
A court blocks the Gezi Park redevelopment project.

== 6 July ==
A legal package proposed by the AKP and passed by parliament at midnight includes a law that removes the authority of TMMOB (UCTEA) over maps, plans and projects and gives it to the Ministry of Culture. The ministry applies to the Regional Administration Court to overturn the ruling of the Istanbul Administration Court which stopped the Gezi Park construction projects.

== 22 July ==
The Ministry of Culture's appeal to a higher Regional Court is accepted, leaving no immediate legal obstacles to the construction plans. PM Erdoğan states that if the courts allow construction to proceed, a plebiscite can be a possibility. Can Atalay, lawyer of the Architects Chamber under the TMMOB (UCTEA), stated that; "even a single nail can not be put in Gezi Park", because of the rejection of current construction plans by the Istanbul Court; this requires the submission of new construction plans or a decision by State Council allowing the construction.

== 30 July ==
Freelance Architects Association of Istanbul(ISMD)announced a design competition on Gezi Park.

== 31 July ==
Thousands gather in Taksim Square for a press statement from the father of the seriously-injured 14-year-old protester Berkin Elvan and demand that the government to find those responsible for Berkin's injury.

== 7 September ==
After a relatively quiet period, protests re-ignite as police attempt to enter the campus of Middle East Technical University (METU / ODTÜ) to enforce construction of a new road which would result in destruction of woodland. Protests in sympathy break out in Istanbul and İzmir.

== 8 September ==
Police fire tear gas at demonstrators in Ankara's Tuzluçayır district.

== 19 September ==
Erdogan publicly dismisses university student protests in Ankara and suggests the demonstrators should "go and live in a forest."

== 20–21 September ==
Protesters were briefly detained in Istanbul's Besiktas district after a 'tea drinking' protest against the privatization of a ferry dock.

An Ankara prosecutor demands six years in prison for 45 university students who held a protest against Erdogan during the launch ceremony of a Turkish satellite in December 2012.

== ODTÜ Resistance of September ==
After a small Gezi-like city protests in Ankara's, Republican People's Party controlled central district of Yenimahalle with the attending of about 3,500 people for days to stop the construction of a stop of telfer transportation line which led about 37 trees, which are about 40 to 50 years old and were positioned on a big junction in district's center, to be cut; and after police's violent response to these protests with teargas, rubber bullets, water cannons and arrests that made the construction continue, in the last week of July, then started there the September protests of Middle East Technical University, which is accepted as the best university of Turkey, to stop an unlawful inter-province road construction that passes directly on the university's land which is an old forest, first planted by university students with some students amongst them, which were going to be important revolutionary figures later in the 1960s, which were really high-tension years for the country. The protests against the road with the attending of most students, Republican People's Party MPs and support of Peace and Democracy Party MPs, grew bigger and bigger on the university area, finding tens of thousands, making it the second Gezi of Turkey in about 3 and a half months. On that day's evening, after police's extreme use of violence against tens of thousands of students, people who came with flowers to plant in the area, citizens in the neighbourhoods near the forest area, thousands of people that walked from the city centre of Ankara, MPs and all the protesters, just like it happened in Gezi Park, made the protests of September blaze and made them spread across the whole country again with the name "ODTÜ" this time, besides "Gezi". Soon after mass protests erupted again across the nation, first deaths have arrived during the protests of September to support ODTÜ Resistance, one in Hatay and one in Istanbul, both victims of police brutality and unlawful use of teargas. The protests still continue around the country. Amnesty also made an official declaration telling whole World companies to stop selling Turkey teargas and materials like it because of the illegal and brutal use. Soon after this statement, Turkish officials started their attempts to produce teargas in Turkey directly and got positive answers on the first phase, this led to protests around Turkey and Istanbul too against this latest news on teargas usage of and production of Turkey.
