= Casualties of the Gezi Park protests =

During the Gezi Park protests in Turkey, police forces repeatedly used excessive force to prevent and disperse peaceful demonstrations. As a result, it is estimated that there were 22 fatalities and least at least 8,163 injuries, of which 63 in serious or critical condition.

== Injuries ==
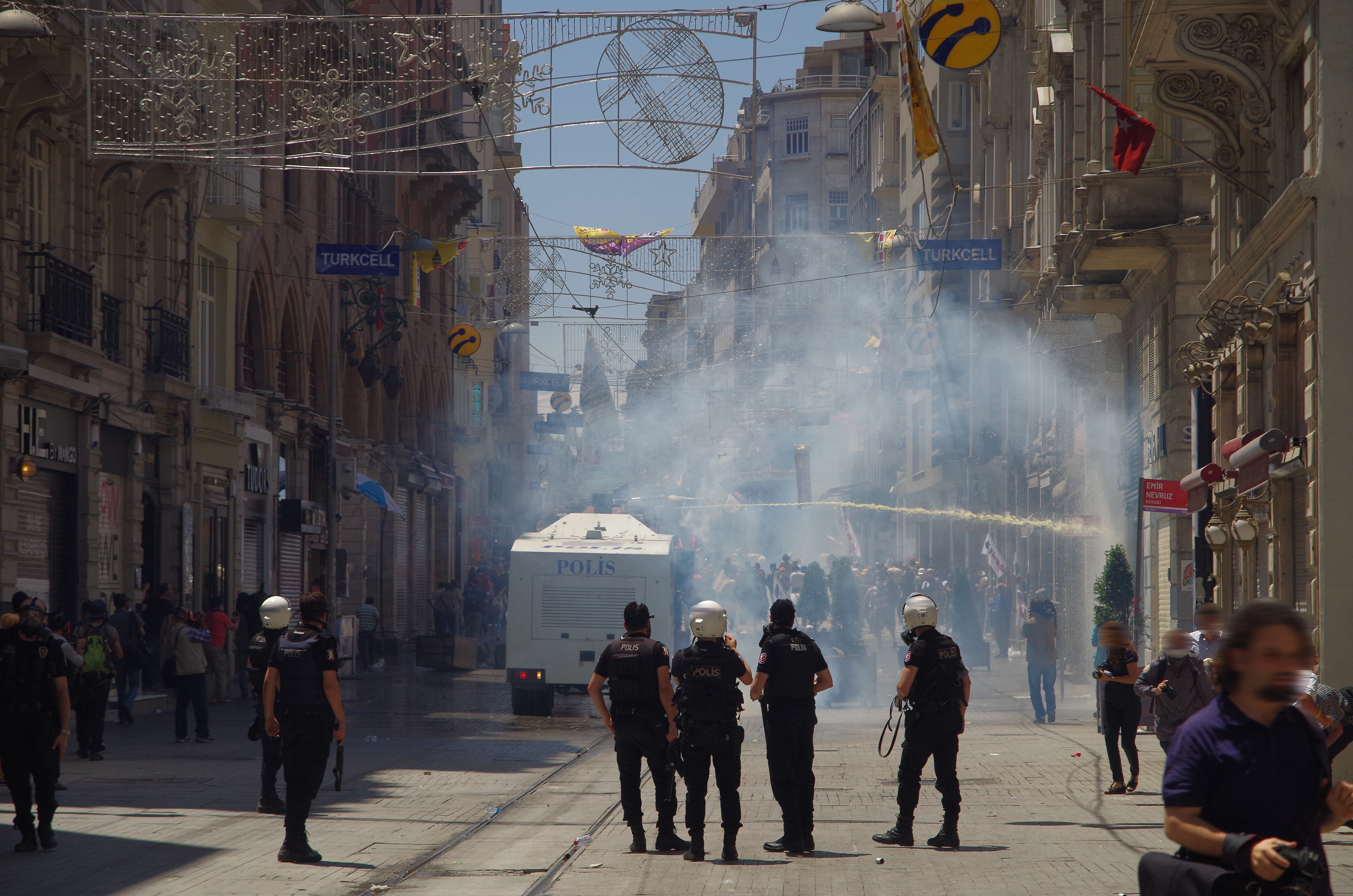
Police using water cannons, tear gas to disperse protestors.

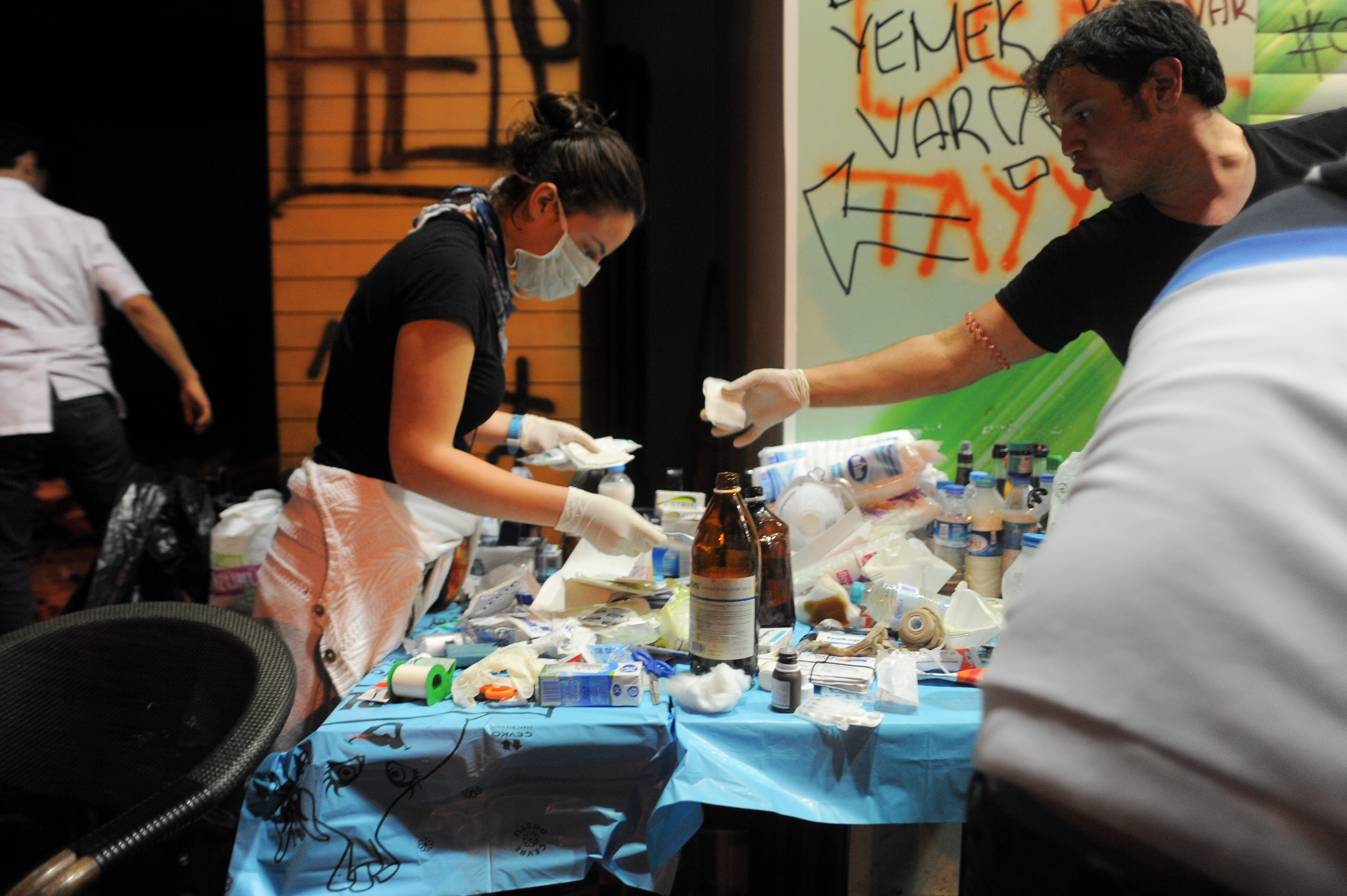
A volunteer assists in medical help at Taksim Square.

The Turkish Medical Association reported on 4 June that 4177 people were reported as wounded in Turkey, 43 of these being heavily wounded and 3 in a critical condition. These people, including "a large number of citizens who lost their eyes", were injured as a result of water cannons and close-range shots from tear gas canisters and plastic bullets aimed directly at them. Amnesty International said water cannons had been targeted at peaceful protesters, while "the inappropriate use of tear gas by police has been the most devastating on the safety of demonstrators, causing an unknown number of injuries, including serious head injuries when the canisters hit protestors." Police were reported to have disguised their ID numbers. Human Rights Watch also condemned this misuse of tear gas.

According to a report of the Turkish Medical Association on 15 July, there were at least 8,163 injured people with at least 63 in serious or critical condition and with at least 3 of them having a risk of death.

A total of 14 people as of 14 September, lost an eye due to tear gas canisters and rubber bullets.

About 200 people received head and brain traumas caused mostly by teargas canisters and baton blows.

According to the Turkish Medical Association, 1 person lost their spleen, caused by extreme police violence.

- Sırrı Süreyya Önder, a member of the Turkish Parliament, was hospitalised after being hit in the shoulder by a tear gas canister (31 May).
- Lobna Allami suffered a head injury due to a tear gas canister on 31 May and stayed in a coma for 24 days. Two operations on her brain were required and she suffered from loss of motor control in one arm and speech loss. She is recovering but still suffers from paralysis of her right side and vocal chords and has amnesia.
- Ahmet Şık, an investigative journalist, known for his vocal opposition to government and prolonged imprisonment, was hit in the head by a tear gas canister; "Onlookers said the canister was deliberately thrown at Şık from a distance of about 10 metres."
- Sezgin Tanrikulu, a noted human rights attorney, and also a member of Parliament from Republican People's Party (CHP), the main opposition party in the Turkish Parliament, was hospitalized after suffering a mild heart attack caused by exposure to tear gas on 31 May.
- Nasuh Mahruki, professional mountain climber, writer, photographer and film producer was hospitalized with a broken leg on 1 June.
- Volkan Kesanbilici, a 38-year-old shop keeper sustained a life-threatening injury when he was hit by a plastic bullet containing hundreds of ball-bearings and lost an eye on 1 June.
- Human Rights Watch reported a student losing an eye after being hit by a plastic bullet.
- Reuters photojournalist Osman Orsal, the photographer who captured the iconic "Woman in Red" images, was wounded when he was struck in the head by a tear gas canister.
- 21-year-old university student Başak Özçelik was hospitalized after being severely attacked by police and some civilians armed with batons and rods.
- Reporters without Borders said on 5 June that at least 14 journalists (including Orsal and Şık) had been injured, and documented another three injured on 11 June.
- The Jerusalem Post correspondent Igal Aciman reported that his apartment was hit with tear gas grenades shot through the window while sleeping on 16 June. He received only minor burns.
- Sibel Cıngı, a 73-year-old lung cancer patient with a prior lung surgery, was exposed to extreme amount of tear gas inside her apartment after a canister was shot through her window on 16 June, leading to complications such as dyspnea and arrhythmia. International laws and ECHR case law strictly bans indoor use of CS gas in this manner according to Sedat Ergin.
- Mustafa Ali Tombul, a 16-year-old boy, was hit in the head by a gas bomb canister fired at close distance (5–10m), in the day of the re-opening of the Gezi Park (8–9 July), while he was trying to stop his father arguing with another shop owner.
- Several people sustained injuries from gas canisters in Antakya during demonstrations in support of the victim of the protests, Ali İsmail Korkmaz.
- Aydın Ay, a 35-year-old man was hit in his head by a teargas capsule fired by riot police in Dikmen, Ankara on 14 July. It was reported that he had a compression fracture and cerebral hemorrhage.
- Serhat Köksal, Istanbulite multimedia artist known with his own-produced 2/5 BZ and Gözel projects, have fractured both of his arms during the escape away from riot police in Taksim.
- Yener Çıracı, a student of Hacettepe University who joined the latest protests of Middle East Technical University after Ankara Municipality workers entered the university site without permission and unlawfully chopped down most of its forest which blazed another resistance fire across Turkey for protecting it, and after thousands of citizens, students with the participation of METU's Rector Prof.Dr.Ahmet Acar, deans and other officials, re-planted the cleared area as a respond to the unlawful cutting of the forest, has been beaten up and thrown into the barricade fire which the protesters lit to protect themselves from riot vehicles and teargas usage, by the riot police. This was interfered as illegal under torture and unlawful police action titles and his family told that this event will be challenged in the court. After being thrown up on the fire, most parts of Yener Çıracı's skin have encountered dangerous and vital burns.

== Deaths ==
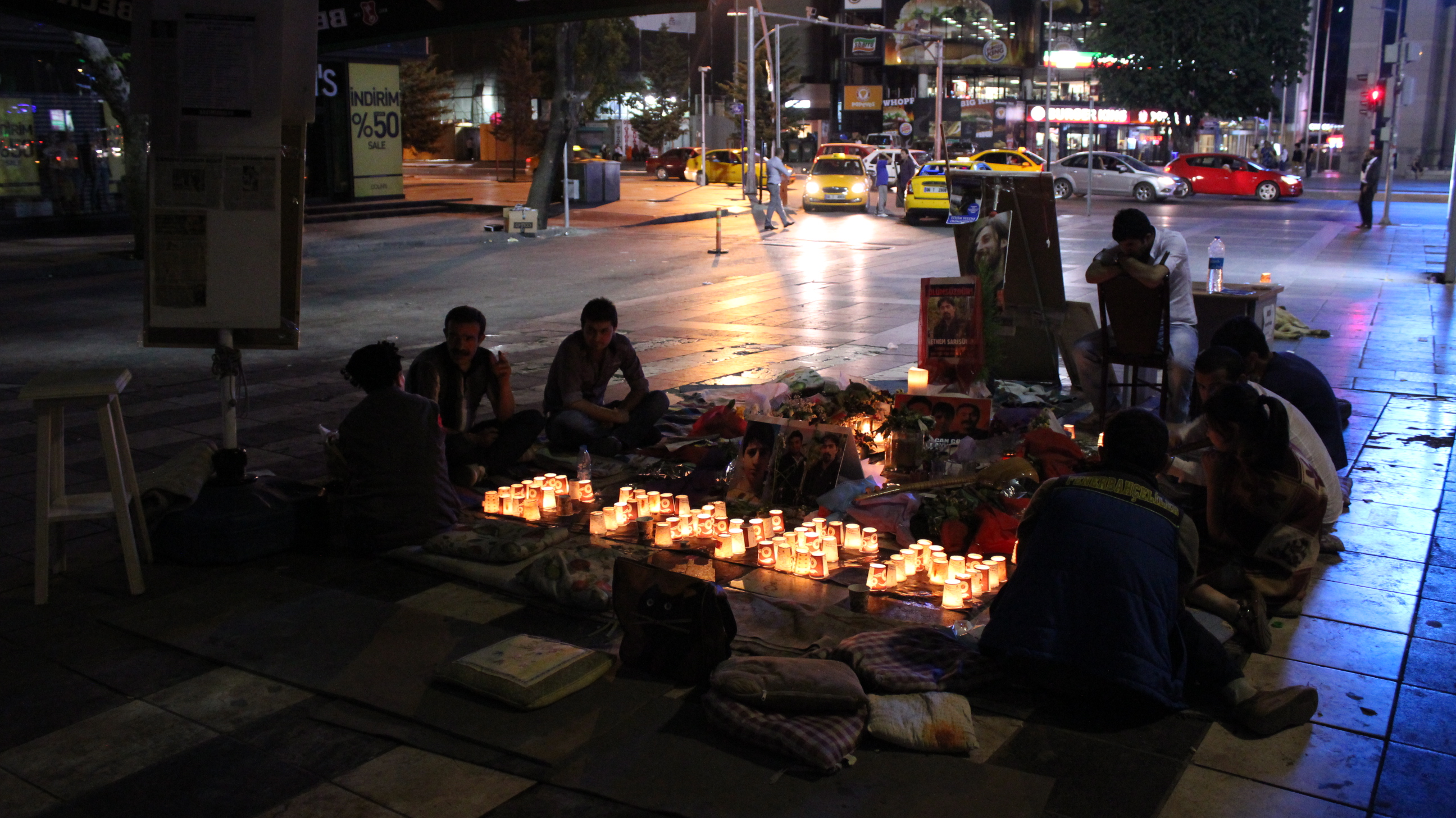
Death place of Ethem Sarısülük in Kızılay, Ankara. Had set as the memorial place in post-40 days.

- Mehmet Ayvalitas was the first known death related to the demonstrations. The 20-year-old Socialist Solidarity Platform (SODAP) member was hit and killed when a taxi drove into a group of demonstrators on an Istanbul highway during an anti-government protest. Huseyin Demirdizen, a board member of the Turkish Medical Association (Türk Tabipler Birliği; TTB) confirmed his death and said four other people were also injured, one of them seriously.
- Selim Önder, an 88-year-old musician, was exposed to excessive amounts of tear gas on 31 May while trying to buy souvenirs and died a few days afterwards.
- Abdullah Cömert, 22-year-old youth branch member of the Republican People's Party (CHP) in Antakya, received a head injury in Hatay and later died in hospital on 3 June 2013. A Turkish Internet activism and hacking group, RedHack, released police documents on 11 September detailing the working hours, vehicles and locations of police officers. These documents were considered by left-wing and left-leaning news agencies to prove that 5 to 6 police officers were responsible for Abdullah's death. The leaks helped the judicial authorities take faster action. Initial reports described a wound from gunfire as the result of Cömert's death, with the Governor of Hatay Province echoing the hypothesis. Four months after Cömert was killed, an official report by the Turkish Forensic Medicine's first specialization department was published. The report concluded that Cömert was killed by a tear gas canister that hit his head. Another report by the Turkish gendarmerie indicated that two of the police officers suspected to have fired the gas canister, Ahmet Kuş and Hacı Ali Demir, were "interrogated as witnesses rather than as suspects." On 14 March 2016, the Balıkesir 2. Aggravated Felony Court charged Kuş with homicide beyond intent, per the Turkish Criminal Code, and he was sentenced to 13 years and 4 months in prison. The ruling was later overturned by the First Penal Department of the Turkish Court of Cassation. Kuş's case was tried again in the same court, and on 19 November 2018, he was charged with conscious negligence and sentenced to 6 years, 10 months, and 15 days in prison. The ruling was approved by the Court of Cassation, and Kuş was arrested in March 2020.
- Ethem Sarısülük, a 26-year-old human rights activist who worked at OSTIM, died on 2 June; he was reported dead 11 days after he was shot in the head in Ankara by Ahmet Şahbaz, a police officer.
- Mustafa Sarı, a Police commissioner, died on 5 June, falling off a bridge while pursuing protesters in the southern province of Adana.
- İrfan Tuna died in Ankara on 6 June from a heart attack that resulted from overexposure to tear gas.
- Zeynep Eryaşar, a 55-year-old woman with diabetes, died in Avcılar, Istanbul on 15 June, from a heart attack that resulted from the crowd and police pressure.
- Ali İsmail Korkmaz, a 19-year-old student from Antakya, studying in Anadolu Üniversitesi (Anadolu University) in Eskişehir suffered a severe brain injury on 2 June after being attacked by a group that eyewitnesses allege included undercover police. He was confirmed dead in early July. In his autopsy report on 10 July, the cause of death was stated as cerebral hemorrhage caused by violent blows onto his head during the attack. The camera records showing the people attacking Ali İsmail Korkmaz was found in a local hotel, police took the records and shortly after it was told by the court that the videos were irreversibly damaged. although the hotel owner denied this. Later, the "irreversibly damaged" video was uploaded to the internet but according to legal experts it had a cut of 18 to 20 minutes. The prosecutor responsible for the case was changed in the middle of the proceedings after sending the hard disk to the Forensic Medicine Association to clarify whether the camera recordings were deleted by officials. The reason was reported as the judiciary holiday until 1 September by officials. As the investigation continued, the governor of Eskişehir, Güngor Azim Tuna alleged that "mostly civilians were responsible for the death rather than our police". Soon after, new video recordings of the street during the event were found and it was cleared that 4 police and 4 civilians besides them are responsible for the death. 5 people including the responsible civilians and a police officer were arrested. The case still continues for these 8 people. Korkmaz's family also applied to the court for an investigation on the Doctor Hasan Gücel who didn't treat Ali without a document from the police at first and sent him home with a painkiller while he was having a brain hemorrhage, stating that he is as responsible as others for the murder. Although, the governor of Eskişehir, Güngor Azim Tuna, didn't give investigation permission on the doctor. The family decided to apply to the higher courts.
- Ahmet Atakan, a 22-year-old protester taking part in a demonstration in a left-wing stronghold of the Armutlu neighborhood in Antakya, demonstrating solidarity with protests against the illegal road construction through Middle East Technical University's old forest, died from heavy cerebral damage caused by a tear gas canister fired by police at around 2 a.m. on 10 September while Ahmet was on a rooftop. Mevlüt Dudu, a member of parliament of Republican People's Party from Hatay confirmed the death first on Halk TV even though he was still alive at that moment. Soon after, hospital officials confirmed the death. The teargas canisters with bloodstains were found around his death place and the investigation still continues as eyewitnesses and a big margin of the Turkish people defends that his death reason was the canister that shot him on the rooftop, AKP supporters and officials defend he simply fell down from the rooftop whilst he was trying to throw a solar panel on the riot police vehicle. Special investigators hired by Ahmet's family found the bloody tear gas canister on 13 September, near the area in a sewage and this was interpreted as an attempt to get rid of the evidences by responsibles. MP of Republican People's Party from Hatay, Refik Eryılmaz has accompanied the family and investigators while they gave the evidences (the canister and a second amateur video), to the Chief Prosecutor's. During the investigation process, many wide sit-ins and protests to provide "justice in the case and on evidences" and to put officials under pressure, giving them no way to get the death covered up with any scenarios, were held and are still being held across Turkey. While the final news mostly proved that the death caused by the police's shot, the official forensic investigation and case is still going on for and to clarify the situation and also look for any responsibles.
- Serdar Kadakal, a 35-year-old tonmeister at a Jazz & Blues Bar in Kadıköy, Istanbul, also living in the district, died on the evening of 13 September 2013 because of a heart attack triggered by extreme inhalation of OC spray and teargas during re-ignited protests of early-September in Turkey in the district of Kadıköy, a district where the mass protests and police brutality took place in Istanbul besides Taksim. There are some opposite allegations about the cause of his death being made by police, too. The autopsy report denied any police involvement and referred to previous heart problems.
- Berkin Elvan, a 14-year-old boy was hit in the head by a tear-gas canister during the evening protests at Okmeydanı, on 15 June 2013, sustaining severe head injuries. After 267 days in coma, Berkin decreased to 16 kilos and got in critical condition, then he was taken to the intensive care unit. That evening Turkish President Abdullah Gül called the family for "good wishes" and to ask "if there is something they can do", this call was often criticised as the boy was shot by government's police force and was in coma for 267 days. Two and a half days after these, the 15-year-old boy's heart stopped around 07:00 am and was in that condition for 20 minutes, doctors managed to rework his heart but the time without bloodflow was too much, so his brain died and his brain death, then soon after his death was reported by the doctors and the family with "deep sadness, weeping and anger against those who did this and didn't care and help at all, throughout 269 days in Berkin's coma." Many commemoration marches and huge protests were organized around Turkey and is going to take place during this day(11 March, Berkin's Death) and upcoming weeks, until elections. All these; voice tapes of Erdoğan, his family and his friends showing corruption and bribery, AKP's cold conflict with Gülen movement and lately. Berkin's death, the latest victim of Occupy Gezi protests, are expected to cost the ruling AK Party votes.
  - On 31 July, thousands gathered in Taksim Square to support Berkin Elvan and his family and to tell the government to find the responsible of Berkin's injury, while it was planned that the father Sami Elvan was going to make a press statement. Police attacked the protesters and cleared the square, blocking the entries. Some were injured and some were arrested. Then the family made the short statement inside the crowd before the police interference again. Soon after, police interfered again, preventing the family from freely speaking as the crowd got bigger into the İstiklal Avenue. These was criticised as against to the freedom of speech. Member of Parliament from Republican People's Party and also the party's assistant director Sezgin Tanrıkulu was also seen talking to the police to stop the attack but he was manhandled by the police too. During the interference in İstiklal Avenue and Mis Street a police was seen pointing his gun at the protesters. As the protests continued through the night, news of many injuries and arrests by the riot police have arrived. Turkish media was silent to the protests and demands except the channels like Halk TV, Ulusal Kanal, Cem TV, etc., while the foreign media channels like CNN International, BBC and Reuters provided on coverage or at least articles.

Most of those killed were members of the Alevi minority.

== Missing people ==
Ümit Kocasakal, head of Istanbul Bar Association, stated in his speech that they received 146 missing person reports (39 women and 107 men) during the first three weeks of demonstrations. 137 people out of 146 have been found. The remaining 9 people, on the other hand, were still missing as of 25 June 2013.

== Torture ==
On 4 June's night, a lorry driver named Hakan Yaman who was not related to the protests that time was beaten and thrown into a fire near the area by the riot police leading him to wound brutally and lose his one eye and most of his skin to burn. His family appointed to the court for torture and unlawful police action with video evidence.

On 26 June (United Nations International Day of Fight Against Torture and in Support of Victims of Torture), a common statement was made at the İzmir Bar Association in İzmir. Officers of the İzmir Bar Association (İzmir Barosu), the Contemporary Jurists Association, the Turkish Human Rights Foundation and the Human Rights Association reported that a total of 169 people had applied to the Turkish Human Rights Foundation's treatment and rehabilitation centers because of ill-treatment and police torture.

On 26 October's evening, during the high-tension times before the Republic Day, while the national protests for Middle East Technical University continue, a student of METU, was beaten and thrown into the barricade fire which the protesters lit by the riot police, during the latest protests that occurred after the forest was cleared with a night-time operation on 18 October and after students with the participation of the rector Professor Doctor Ahmet Acar, deans and other officials of the university, planted 3017 trees again in a rejoicing way on 25 October, one week after the Ankara Municipality workers entered and chopped down the forest without permission, in the cleared area with wide support across country, mostly in Istanbul, İzmir, other districts of Ankara, Antalya and other universities across Turkey, in and near METU's forest, Ankara, leading his skin to burn seriously.

== Sexual harassment ==
On 27 June's night, a 31-year-old female named Eylem K., who attended the night's protests in Ankara, was taken into custody by riot police with 10 other people, including a boy under 18. On 28 June, in front of the Ankara Courthouse, she reported that she was subject to violence, sexual harassment and torture in the police car where she was detained. She also stated that she was threatened with rape and torture continued for almost 2 hours in 2 different cars.

== Deaths of animals ==
Police gas and blast bombs killed many animals as well. Stray dogs, cats and birds in particular have died of heart attacks or gas poisoning. Acclaimed Turkish director Zeki Demirkubuz tweeted that "I have seen birds falling off the trees because of the gas." There were mobile animal hospitals in and around Gezi Park during the protests, but after protests many veterinaries refrained to give testimonies. Freedom to Earth Association has noted this self-censor when it attempted to gather different testimonies and photo evidences for injured and killed animals. On 28 September, after exactly four months since protests sparked, the association called for a commemoration for all living beings murdered by Turkish police during the riots. Different groups have attended such as LGBT organizations, anticapitalist Muslims, anarchist block and PEN-International Turkey. However Turkish police have barred this mass to read their press statement, collected ID's from anyone, pushed people with their shields and arrested ones who resisted. After 13 arrests, remaining group have made their rally, read their statement which announced that Turkish state is being taken to Court of Justice for Animal Rights. The complaint was filed with the Court shortly thereafter.
