= Death of Berkin Elvan =

Turkish police brutality victim

Berkin Elvan
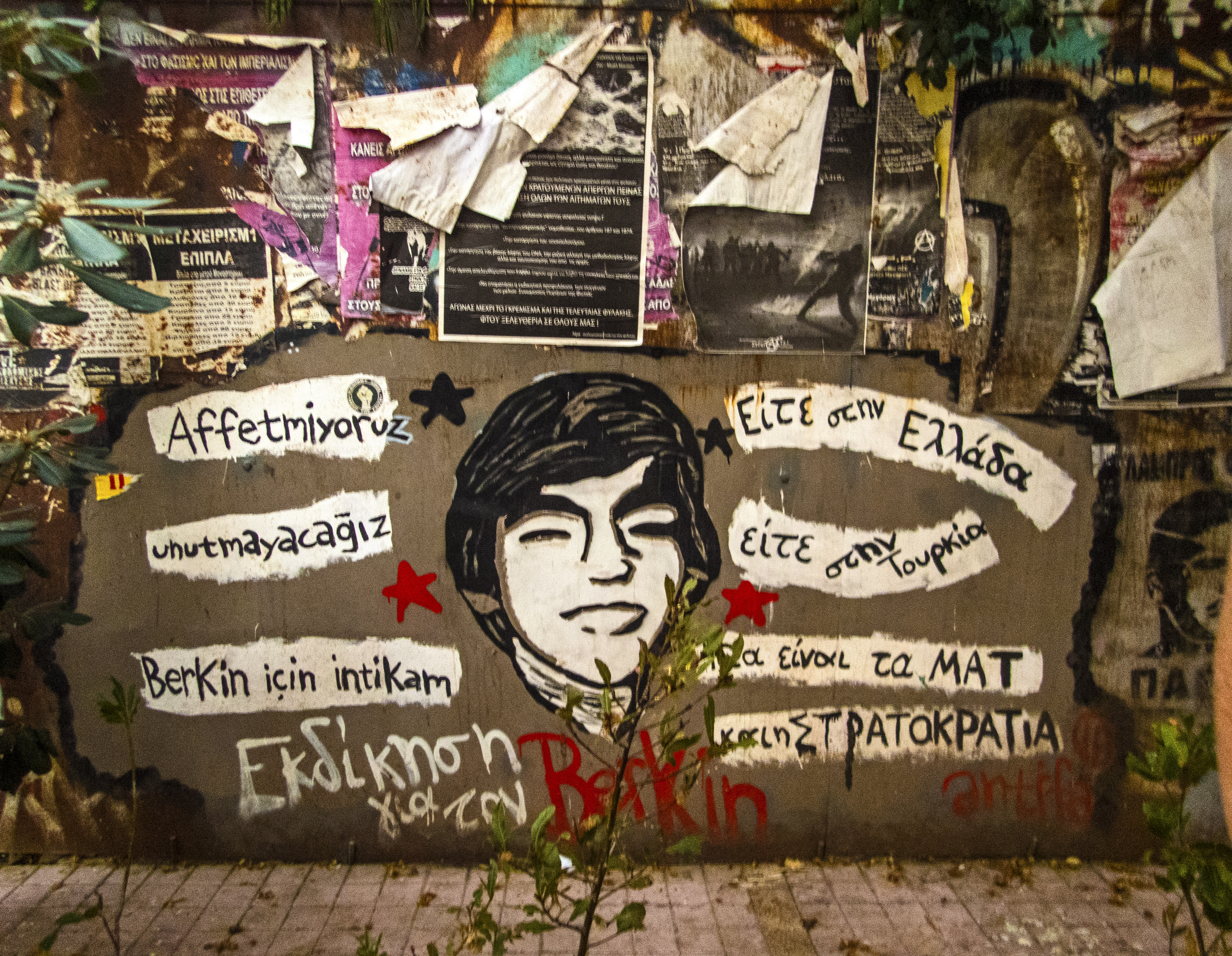
- Berkin Elvan, in a mural painted at a memorial in the streets of Athens.
- Born: 5 January 1999; Turkey
- Died: 11 March 2014 (aged 15); Okmeydanı, Istanbul, Turkey
- Cause of death: Fatally injured after hit by a police tear gas capsule
- Resting place: Feriköy Cemetery, Istanbul, Turkey
- Parents: Sami Elvan (father); Gülsüm Elvan (mother)

Berkin Elvan (5 January 1999 – 11 March 2014) was a 15-year-old boy who was hit on the head by a tear-gas canister fired by a police officer in Istanbul during the June 2013 anti-government protests in Turkey. He died on March 11, 2014. Lawyers representing the family said Elvan's condition worsened over the last week of his life, with his weight dropping from 45 kg to 16 kg. Widespread demonstrations erupted following Berkin's death.

His father was from Tokat, while his mother was from Tunceli.

== Events ==
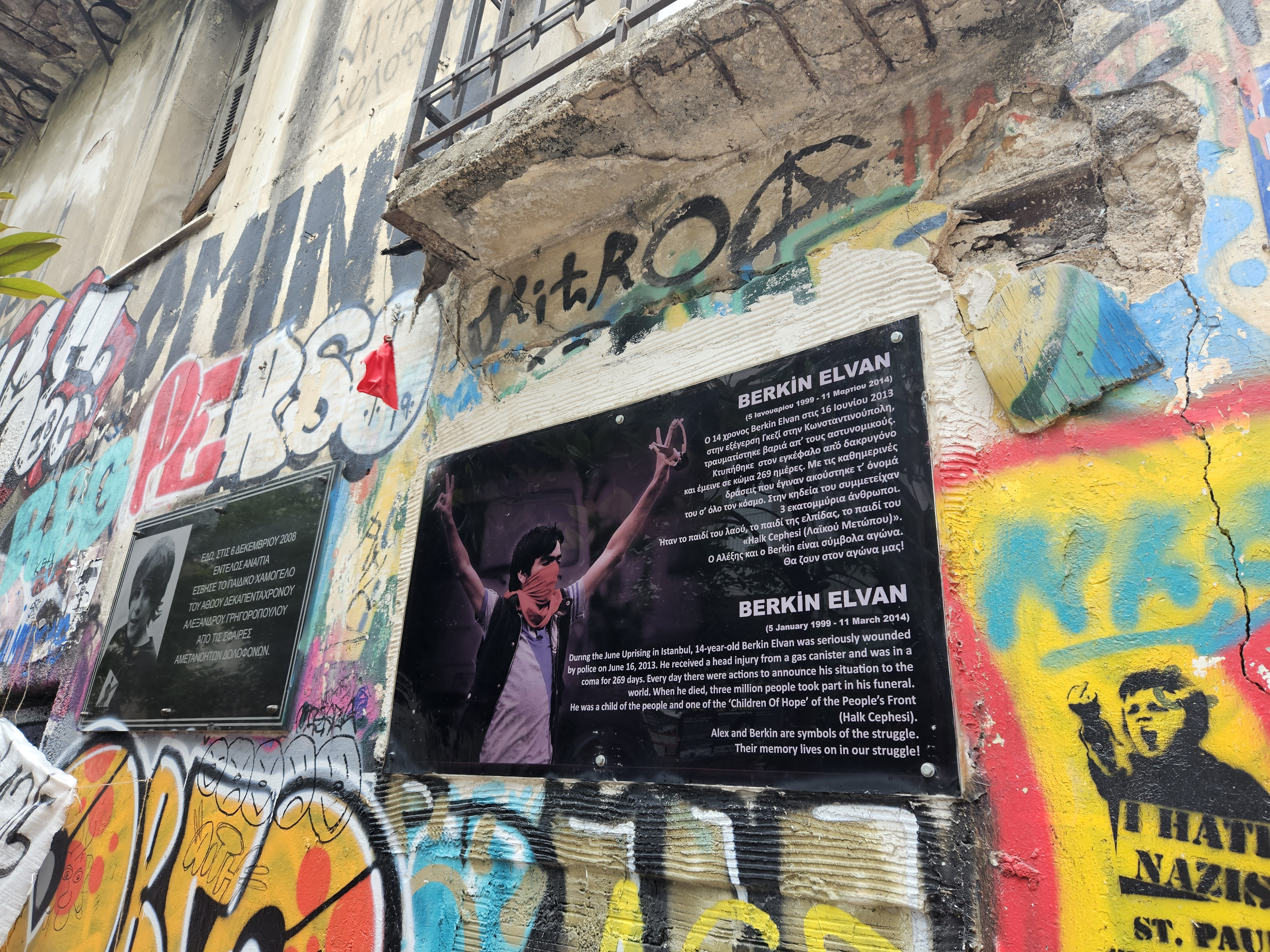
Memorial plaque in Exarchia, Athens

On 16 June 2013, Berkin was in an area where the Gezi Park protests unfolded near his home in Okmeydanı, Istanbul. That day his mother wanted to go out and buy bread, but Berkin said that the streets were too dangerous and because he was younger, he could run faster in case of an emergency. He was later hit on the head by a tear gas canister fired by police officer Fatih Dalgalı. Berkin fell into a coma and died 269 days later on 11 March 2014. His funeral was held in Istanbul on March 12 and attended by thousands of people. He was buried at the Feriköy Cemetery in Istanbul.

== Investigation and trial ==
On 12 March 2014, four police officers testified for the ongoing investigation concerning the case of Berkin Elvan's injury during the Gezi protests. Overall, 18 police officers testified as suspects in the investigation, including these four. The prosecution evaluated the footage of the surveillance cameras for three years until they were able to identify and prosecute Dalgalı. He was prosecuted for manslaughter on 6 April 2017, but the court decided not to issue an arrest warrant for Dalgalı. On 3 February 2020, the gendarmery issued a report mentioning that Elvan was partly to blame for his own death, since he was in an area of protests. After two more hearings in 2021, Dalgalı was sentenced to 16 years and 8 months in prison, but the court abstained from ordering an arrest for Dalgalı.

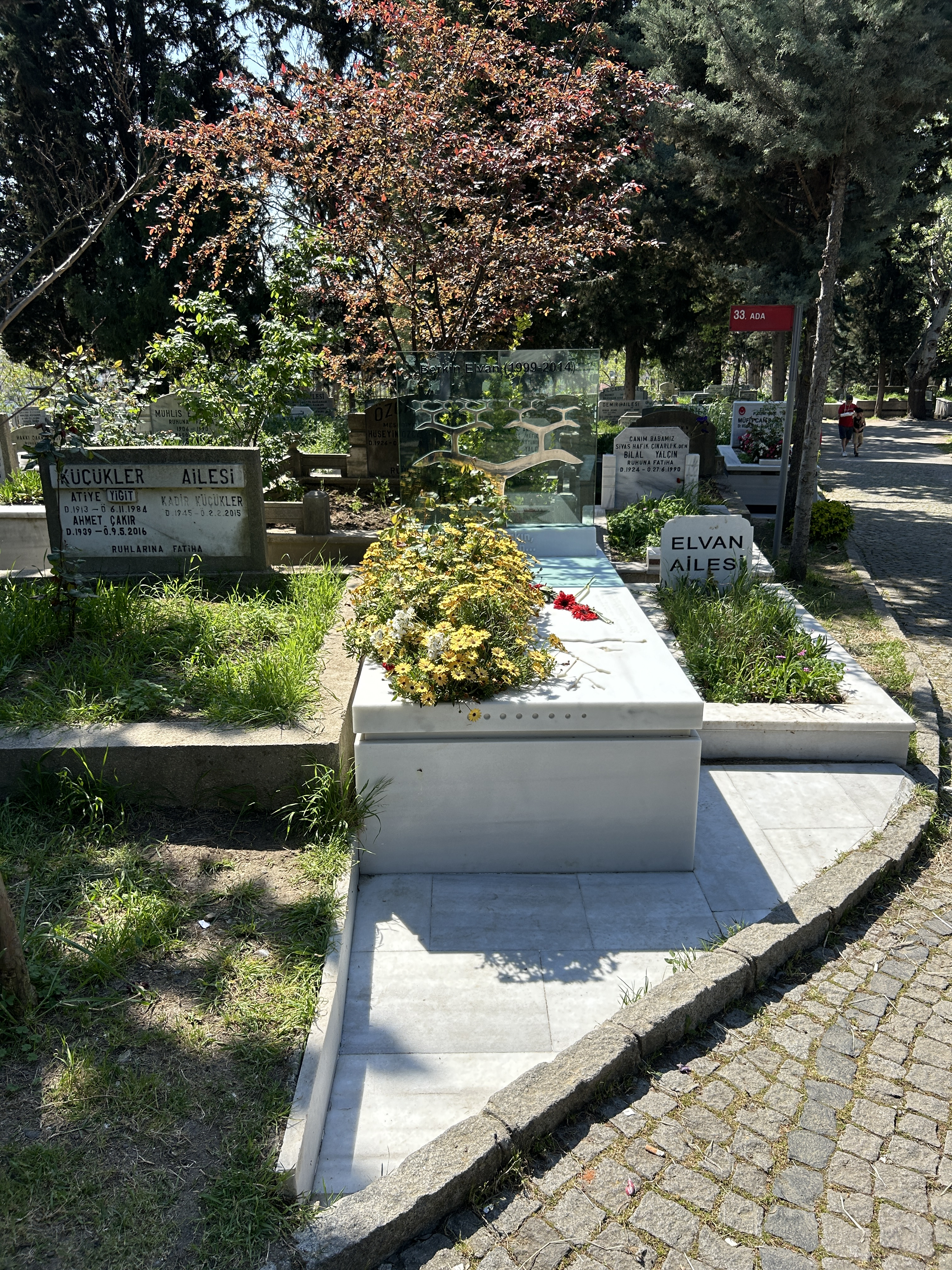
Elvan's grave in Feriköy Cemetery

== Funeral ceremony and burial ==
Following Elvan's death, a funeral ceremony was held at a cemevi in the Okmeydanı district of Şişli, attended by tens of thousands of people. His body was brought to the Feriköy Cemetery after a five-hour walk. When brought to the cemetery, Elvan's body was taken from the hearse and carried on shoulders before being buried.

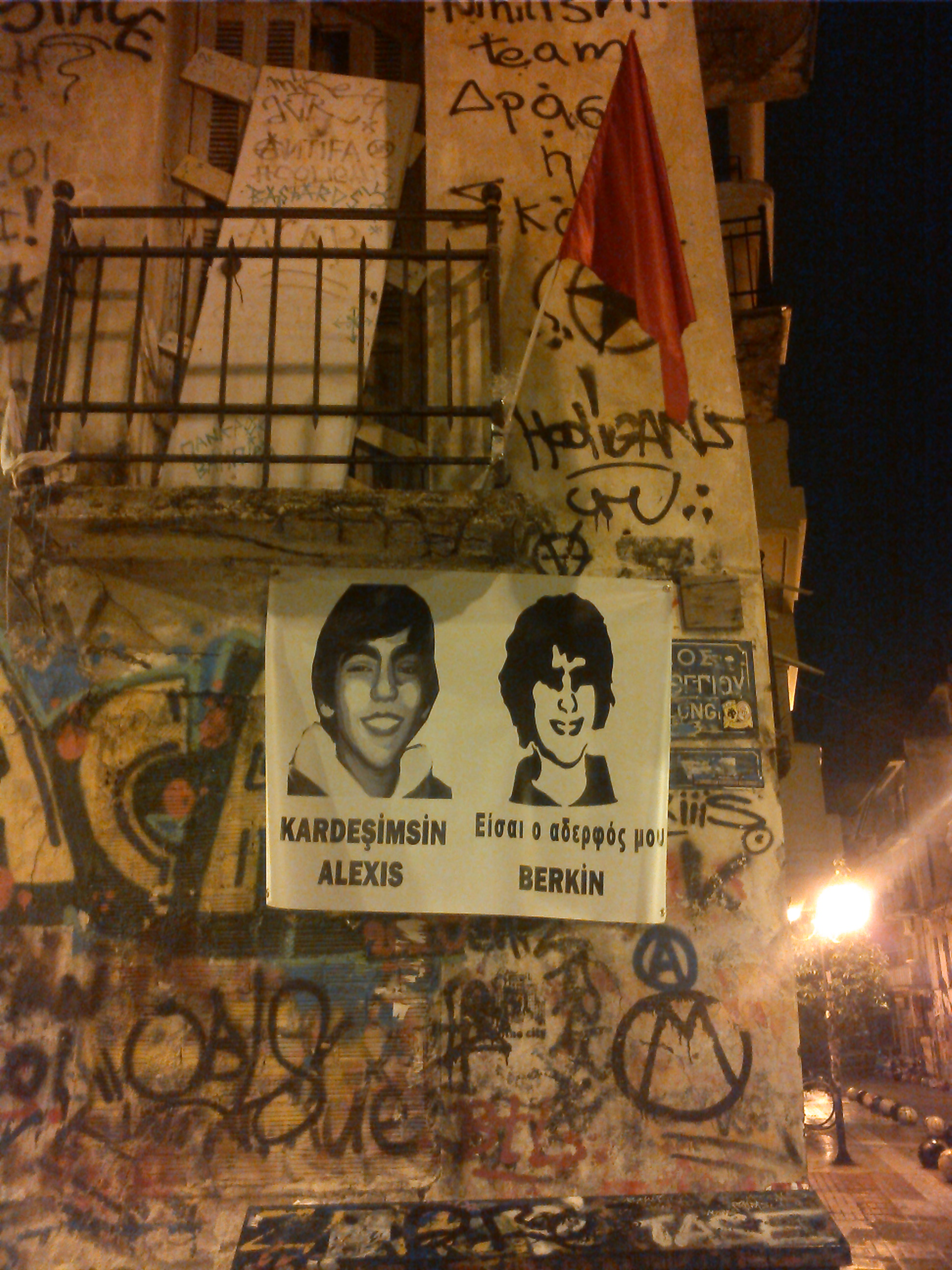
Banner placed in Greece, in March 2014 at the place where Alexis Grigoropoulos got shot in Exarchia, Athens

== Reactions ==
- Abdullah Gül: "I was really sad when I saw it on TV this morning. When this incident finally happened, he was a 14-year-old child of ours. I learned today that he passed away. I offer my condolences to his family. I share their pain.
- DİSK: "To say 'Bread and Hope Entrusted to the People of Turkey' on March 12, 2014 at 12 o'clock, we put aside our 'work and effort', stand up wherever we are and bid farewell to Berkin! Berkin Elvan is immortal!.. We will not forget him!.."
- Hüseyin Avni Mutlu: "We lost Berkin Elvan, who fought for a long time to hold on to life. May God have mercy on him and offer my condolences to his esteemed family and loved ones."
- Lütfi Elvan: "We are truly sorry. I offer my condolences to his family. May Allah have mercy on him. Of course, we hope that such incidents will never happen again. It is an extremely saddening incident. May Allah grant him a place in heaven."
- Kemal Kılıçdaroğlu: "Another one of our children has joined the caravan of Gezi martyrs."
- İkrar Sarısülük (Ethem Sarısülük's sibling): "But you were going to get up, kid, we were going to call you Ethem Berkin. You were going to be Ethem, our Ethem, our Berkin."
- Mustafa Sarısülük (Ethem Sarısülük's Brother): "Yet you were going to get up. We were going to call you Ethem Berkin. You were going to be Ethem. What should we write now? How should we say it?"
- Halit Ergenç: "Please wait a minute. Not you, but your conscience. Yes you. Can you really look into these eyes? Really..."
- Ümit Nazlı Boyner: "I wish patience to the Berkin Elvan family and all his loved ones. May he rest in peace."
- Çarşı: "#BerkinElvan we lost our childhood"
- Devlet Bahçeli: "No one should play into the hands of those who hope for chaos using the late Berkin as an excuse, and no one should carry water to the mill of chaos. Berkin is a loss for all of us, a sadness for all of us, a common pain for everyone. His young body could not withstand the burden it was under."
- Erdoğan drew criticism for booing the mother of the deceased Berkin.

Turkish Prime Minister Recep Tayyip Erdoğan claimed that Elvan was a "member of a terrorist organization"; Erdogan’s supporters said Elvan behaved violently and photos of a hooded youth online were circulated online. Berkin was known to disagree with the governments actions.

In March 2014, Maoist rebels attacked a police station in Tunceli in revenge for Elvan's killing.

=== Protests ===
Following Elvan's death, protests erupted throughout Turkey in Adana, Adıyaman, Antalya, Ankara, Ardahan, Bursa, Bolu, Çorum Düzce, Edirne, Gaziantep, Istanbul, İzmir, Konya, Hatay, Malatya, Sivas, Şanlıurfa, Şırnak, Kayseri, Tunceli, Tokat, Zonguldak and worldwide in cities such as Nuremberg, London, Paris, Vienna, Helsinki, Strasbourg, Stockholm, New York City, Boston, Washington D.C., Amsterdam, Barcelona, Bielefeld, Berlin, Brussels, The Hague, Dresden, Duisburg, Frankfurt, Hamburg, Cologne, Lausanne, Lisbon, Rotterdam, Stuttgart, Warsaw, Seattle, and Toronto.

During the official event for the National Sovereignty and Children's Day held in Eyüpsultan, Istanbul on 23 April 2014, three children who held a banner and chanted slogans reading "Berkin Elvan is Immortal" and were taken into custody by police officers while Istanbul Governor Hüseyin Avni Mutlu was on stage to give awards to students. It was learned that after the 3 children were detained, another child in the area was detained. On the same date, during the April 23 celebrations in Samsun, a person who entered the ceremony area with a banner in his hand was removed from the ceremony area by security forces and detained.

=== Misattributed Sultanahmet attack ===
On January 6, 2015, it was announced on a website close to the Revolutionary People's Liberation Party-Front that the suicide attack in front of the Istanbul Police Department Tourism Branch Office in the Sultanahmet district of Istanbul's Fatih district was carried out by Elif Sultan Kalsen, a member of the organization. The reason for the attack in the statement was presented as "the punishment of Berkin Elvan's murderers by our self-sacrificing warrior and holding the fascist state that protects the AKP's corrupt and thieving ministers accountable." Kalsen's family, who was brought to the Forensic Medicine Institute to identify the dead attacker, said that the body did not belong to Kalsen, while the police made a statement that the attacker was not Kalsen. After a while, the Revolutionary People's Liberation Party-Front made a statement that the attack was not carried out by them and that the previous statement was made as a result of a mistake.

=== Istanbul Justice Palace hostage crisis ===
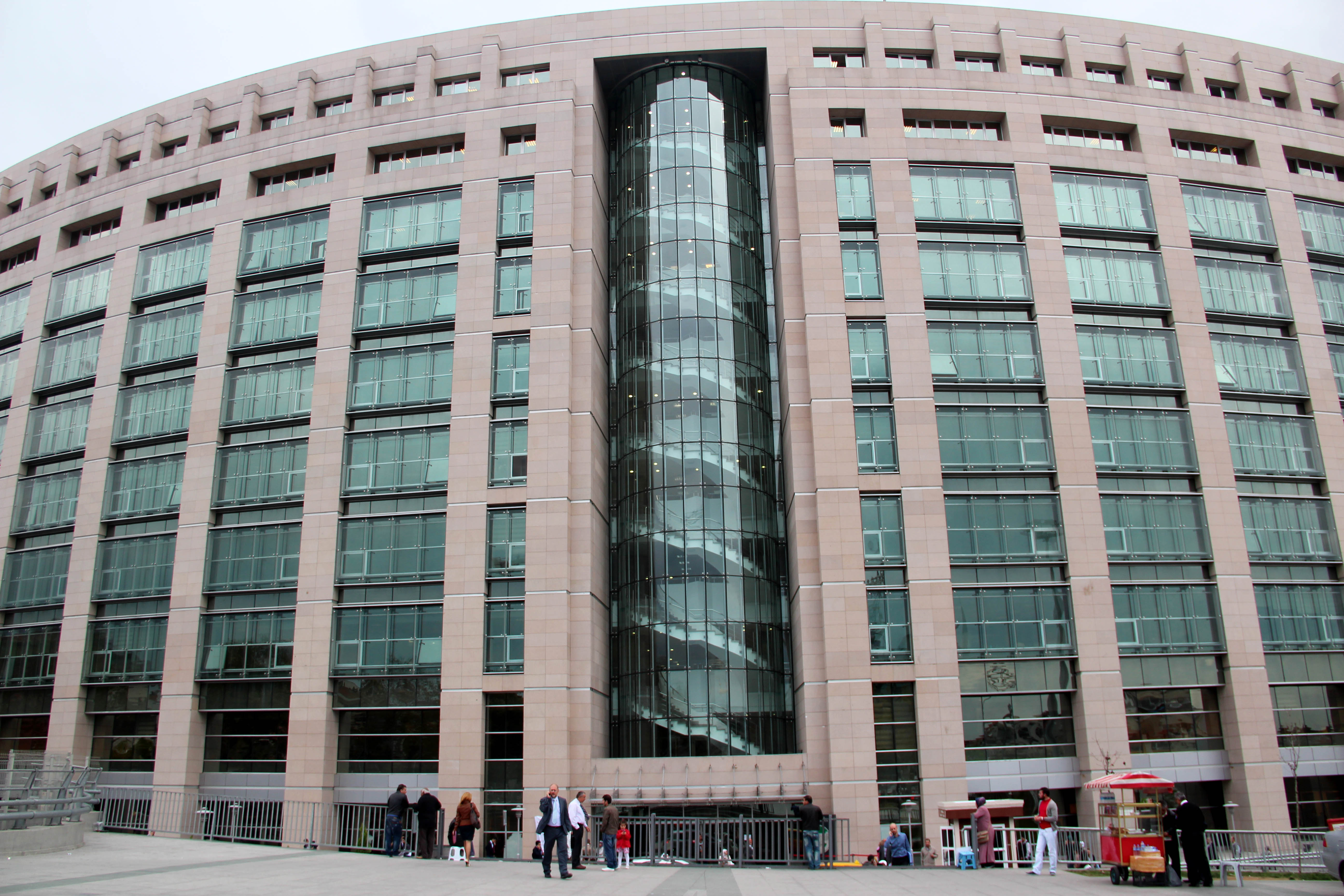
Istanbul Palace of Justice

On 31 March 2015, two members of the Revolutionary People's Liberation Party/Front (DHKP-C) entered the Istanbul Justice Palace and took the public prosecutor Mehmet Selim Kiraz, who was investigating the Berkin Elvan case, hostage. The perpetrators threatened to kill the prosecutor and gave the police a list of demands. The incident lasted about nine hours, turning into a clash between the members and Turkish security forces. As a result, the prosecutor and the perpetrators were killed.

== See also ==
- Gezi Park protests
- Gezi Park protest deaths
- Ali İsmail Korkmaz
