= Taking a Stand in Baton Rouge =

Protest photograph

Coordinates: 30°26′43.8″N 91°05′25.4″W

Taking a Stand in Baton Rouge by Jonathan Bachman

Taking a Stand in Baton Rouge is a photograph of Ieshia Evans, a nurse from Pennsylvania, being arrested by police officers dressed in riot gear during a protest in front of the Baton Rouge Police Department headquarters, on 9 July 2016. The protest began in the aftermath of the shooting by police of Alton Sterling and Philando Castile.

The image, taken by Jonathan Bachman for Reuters, became a viral phenomenon on social media, described by several media organizations as "iconic", with some comparing the image (and Evans) to well-known images of other lone protesters, such as the photograph of "Tank Man" in the Tiananmen Square protests of 1989.

== Background ==
At the protest on July 9, 2016, which followed the shooting of Alton Sterling in Baton Rouge and of Philando Castile in Minnesota by police officers, Ieshia Evans was photographed by Jonathan Bachman for Reuters news agency confronting a line of police in riot gear. The image shows a young woman in a flowing dress standing with her arms crossed facing down a line of heavily armed police while two armored officers rush forward to put her in handcuffs. The photograph became a viral phenomenon on social media and a symbol of the Black Lives Matter movement.

Evans was attending her first protest when she was arrested, having traveled to Baton Rouge after seeing news coverage of the shooting of Sterling. She was detained, held overnight and released on the evening of the next day.

It was the first protest of Bachman's career. Bachman said that he knew he had a picture that would speak volumes about what was going on, and that just moments before, he had been facing in the opposite direction and only turned around when he heard someone shout to Evans to warn her that she was going to get herself arrested.

== Cultural impact ==
Multiple media organizations have described the image of Evans as "iconic". (Note: See e.g. The Washington Post, Time, Reuters, BBC News, and Le Figaro. German television channel n-tv has described Evans as an "icon" of the protest.) Teju Cole, writing in the New York Times Magazine, names Bachman's photograph among a group of images of "unacknowledged everyday black heroes" connected to the Black Lives Matter movement, such as those of a man throwing a tear gas canister during a protest in Ferguson, Missouri after the 2014 shooting of Michael Brown; Bree Newsome taking down a Confederate flag at the South Carolina State House; and activist DeRay Mckesson being arrested in Baton Rouge, also while protesting Sterling's death.

The photograph has drawn comparisons to images of previous civil rights demonstrations, such as that of Turkish activist Ceyda Sungur being tear-gassed at a 2013 protest in Istanbul, and Flower Power, a photograph of a young man putting a flower into a National Guardsman's gun barrel during a 1967 anti-war demonstration, as well as the image of "Tank Man" taken during the Tiananmen Square protests of 1989. Yoni Appelbaum, politics editor at The Atlantic, writes:

There are images that are impossible to forget, searing themselves into our collective consciousness. One man staring down a column of tanks in Tiananmen Square. A high school student attacked by police dogs in Birmingham, Alabama. This is such a photo.

Evans was interviewed by Gayle King for CBS This Morning, and the public radio program Studio 360 later commissioned Tracy K. Smith to write a poem on the subject of the image. The photograph was included in The New York Times' "The Year in Pictures 2016".

== Awards ==
Bachman's photograph of Evans standing as the two police officers charge towards her was awarded first prize for Contemporary Issues in the 2017 (60th) World Press Photo Contest.

== Ieshia Evans ==
Evans, the subject of the photograph, was 35 at the time. She is originally from Brooklyn and is a licensed practical nurse in Pennsylvania.

In December 2016, Evans met Bachman for the first time at a symposium on news photography organized by Reuters and the International Center of Photography.

Evans was named AfroAmerica Network Black Woman of the Year for 2016 and was chosen to one of the BBC's 100 Women for that year.

After the protest, Evans was critical of the 2016 election candidates, Donald Trump and Hillary Clinton, as well as the former President Barack Obama. She was a vocal critic of the Trump Administration and has stated that she would like to see more whistleblowing due to skepticism surrounding the issues of social justice.
