= Ceyda Sungur =

Turkish academic and activist

- Born: 1986 (age 39–40)
- Other name: Kırmızılı Kadın
- Citizenship: Turkey
- Occupations: Academician, activist
- Employer: Istanbul Technical University
- Known for: Gezi Park protests

Ceyda Sungur, also known as Kırmızılı Kadın (English: Woman in Red), is a Turkish academic and activist.

== Life ==
She was born in 1986. After completing her bachelor's degree in urban planning, she has started to work as a research assistant at the Istanbul Technical University.

=== Case of police brutality ===
In May 2013, she participated in the Gezi Park protests in Istanbul, and volunteered at an improvised field hospital. During the demonstrations, she was attacked by a police officer named Fatih Zengin. When a photo journalist from the Reuters —Osman Orsal— photographed the moment that Sungur was subject of the police brutality, a huge reaction was sparked both in the Turkish and the international public. Subsequently she became a symbol to the protests. Zengin was sued by prosecutors who pressed for a three-year prison sentence for advertently using disproportionate force against civilians. Sungur pleaded at the court that "if the accused had a weapon, he would have kill me like another police officer who had murdered Ethem Sarısülük". After a year, the trial was concluded and Zengin was sentenced to plant 600 saplings in consequence of that he sprayed tear gas at close range and abused his power. Moreover, another lawsuit that had been filed against Sungur on the charge of "inciting the public to disobey the law" was also dismissed.

== In popular culture ==
=== Books ===
- Turkish-Italian film director Ferzan Özpetek wrote a book named Red Istanbul ("İstanbul Kırmızısı") inspired by the discourse and image of the "Woman in Red".
- Gürsel Öncü, who had been the current editor of the Tarih journal that was closed during the Gezi protests, wrote the book Yaşarken Yazılan Tarih and a picture of Ceyda Sungur and the police officer was used as the cover image.

=== Magazines ===
- Brazil-based culture journal Piauí featured an illustration describing the "Woman in Red" holding the flag of Brazil as the cover image of the July 2013 issue in response to the public uprisings in Brazil at the same time with the Gezi protests. Also, the "#direngezi" hashtag appeared at the bottom of the cover.
- Turkey-based humour magazine Penguen depicted the "Woman in Red" spraying pepper gas towards a police officer as the cover image of the July 2013 issue and released a caption that "The demonstrators attacked the police!". This work was shown among the "most creative humor magazine covers of 2013".
