= Çıkrıkçılar Yokuşu =

Çıkrıkçılar Yokuşu is a slope located in the Altındağ district of Ankara, Turkey. The slope starts from Anafartalar Street and continues to the intersection of Saraçlar and Salman Streets, spanning approximately 200 meters.

== Name ==
During the Ottoman Empire period, the area where Çıkrıkçılar Yokuşu is located was one of the places where the trade known as "sof" constituted a significant percentage of Ankara's economy. In the shops here, wool obtained from Ankara goats was spun into fabric using spinning wheels, resulting in a cloth called "sof". Therefore, the slope was popularly known as "Çıkrıkçılar Yokuşu" (Spinning Wheelers Slope).

== History ==
Çıkrıkçılar Yokuşu, located at the foot of Ankara Castle and dating back to the Ottoman period, was one of the important commercial points of the old city center until the late 19th century. In the area known today as Çıkrıkçılar Bazaar and referred to as Uzun Çarşı (Long Bazaar) during those times, there was a shopping axis consisting of shops opened by craftsmen operating in the same craft on the same street. This commercial chain extended from the area known as the "lower face" of the castle, called Tahtakale, to the location where Hacı Bayram Mosque is situated.

However, during the 1916 fire, along with a large part of the area within the borders of the present-day Kale District, the buildings on Çıkrıkçılar Yokuşu were also affected. Historical sites such as İplikçiler Mosque dated to 1745 and Çanakçılar Mosque, built in 1732, were destroyed by the disaster. Historical settlements such as Boyacı Ali Mahallesi and Tellal Karaca Mahallesi, located between Anafartalar Street and the slope, also did not survive to the present day due to the fire. Despite the efforts of the Ankara Metropolitan Municipality, which declared the vicinity of Çıkrıkçılar Yokuşu as a priority area within the scope of its zoning works initiated in 1982 to preserve the area's architecture and reintegrate it into the city with appropriate environmental arrangements, city planners' dissatisfaction grew over the years due to the failure to achieve the targets set forth in the projects initiated.

== Literary works ==
- Çıkrıkçılar Yokuşu - A poem written by Turkish poet İlhan Berk, included in his book titled Aşıkane.
- Çıkrıkçılar Yokuşu’ndaki Gemi - A short story written by Turkish author Metin İpek, found in the book titled Ankaralı Öyküler.
