= Union of Revolutionary Communists of Turkey =

Marxist-Leninist organization

- Türkiye İhtilalci Komünistler Birliği
- Established: February 1979
- Founder: Aktan İnce and associates
- Headquarters: Turkey

The Union of Revolutionary Communists of Turkey, Union of Revolutionary Communists in Turkey, Turkish Revolutionary Communists' Union, or Revolutionary Communist League of Turkey (Türkiye İhtilalci Komünistler Birliği, TİKB) is a Marxist-Leninist organization based in Turkey. Its student wing is the Democratic University Platform.

== History and ideology ==
The Union of Revolutionary Communists of Turkey was founded by a group also known as Aktancılar, after Aktan İnce, one of their early leaders. They were involved in the reorganization of the People's Liberation Army of Turkey in 1975. In 1977 they split from the group involved with the journal Halkın Kurtuluşu, who later became the Revolutionary Communist Party of Turkey, and launched their own journal, Devrimci Proletarya ('Revolutionary Proletariat'). They took the name Türkiye İhtilalci Komünistler Birliği at a "congress of progressive militants" (İlerici Militanlar Toplantısı) held in February 1979. They subsequently published two illegal periodicals, İhtilalci Komünist ('Revolutionary Communist'), for training militants, and Orak-Çekiç ('Hammer and Sickle'), on tactics. In April 1980, the organization held its first conference in Istanbul. Like many other organizations, the TİKB was affected by the waves of arrests after the 1980 Turkish coup d'état; it was rebuilt beginning in 1987–88 and resumed its activities in Turkey and abroad.

At the organization's second conference in July 1992, Kenan Güngör, Selim Açan, and Yaşar Ayaşlı were elected to the central committee. The third conference was held in 1993 and the fourth in January 2010; both were the occasion of divisions, one of which led to the foundation in 1998 or 1999 of a breakaway TİKB-B, the B standing for "Bolshevik", which formed around the newsletter Proleter Devrimci Duruş ('Proletarian Revolutionary Attitude'). The first TİKB congress was held in September 2012. During the 2013 Gezi Park protests, the organization claimed Ethem Sarısülük, who was killed at a protest in Ankara in June 2013, as a TİKB militant.

The organization describes Turkish society as "semi-colonial and semi-capitalist" and regards it as under American imperialist hegemony. It classifies the former Soviet Union as social-fascistic. It adheres to the Albanian model of socialism. It sees violent revolution as necessary to overthrow bourgeois hegemony and inaugurate the dictatorship of the proletariat.

== Activities ==
Before the 1980 coup, TİKB engaged in violent clashes with other organizations, leading to deaths of both its supporters and rival adherents. It later disavowed this violence. Under a rubric of "socialization" (kamulaştırma), it has attacked jewelers, foreign exchange offices, and banks; further targets have been security forces and political parties, particularly the Nationalist Movement Party, which it classifies as fascist. The Turkish Kurdish United Revolutionary Forces Platform (BDGP) has declared itself "in full unity of action" with TİKB and other Turkish Communist groups, and TİKB claimed responsibility for the February 1997 killing of Nihat Uygun, a Nationalist Movement Party district chairman, as revenge for the "slaughter" of Kurds.

In a 1996 report by Amnesty International, TİKB is described as an armed opposition group responsible for human rights violations. In addition to Turkish activities such as involvement in the Gazi protests, TİKB has also been active in other countries, particularly Germany, where it occupied a radio station in 1996 and is an illegal organization. TİKB and TİKB-B have also been active in the United Kingdom.

== Legal punishments ==
The Revolutionary Communist League is an illegal organization in Turkey. After the 1980 coup, some members were arrested and sentenced to long prison terms. Some died while undergoing torture; others were shot dead while trying to evade arrest. The organization has expressed pride in not having withdrawn from Turkey during this period, and has said that of 8 members of its central committee who were arrested, only one confessed and that 90% of arrested militants refused to confess to the police; according to the organization, it has the largest number of militants to have not confessed under torture. According to an October 1982 report by the independent organization Alternative Türkeihilfe, court martial proceedings in Istanbul and Ankara included 113 defendants who were accused of being members of TİKB, with the death penalty being requested in 22 cases. A press review in June 1986 found 186 trials of people accused of TİKB membership, of which 6 resulted in death sentences.

Accused members of the Revolutionary Communist League have continued to be prosecuted in Turkey, for example:

- On April 4, 1998, the State Security Court in Ankara ruled in a case against five people accused of committing crimes as members of TİKB. One was found innocent, one was sentenced to 12 and a half years in prison, and three (Adem Kepeneklioğlu, Turan Tarakçı, and Mehmet Hakan Canpolat) were sentenced to death.
- On July 20, 2001, of 21 defendants accused of being members of TİKB and committing crimes including the killing of a police officer in Istanbul in January 2001, three (Erdinç Yücel, Erkan Altun, and Yüksel Okuyucu) were sentenced to death.
- In September 2008, the trial in Istanbul of 22 people accused of crimes on behalf of the TİKB including three murders (of Emrah Sarıtaş and Ergin Topal on August 2, 1995, and Deniz Birinci on June 23, 1998) ended with two defendants being sentenced to life imprisonment and three (Gürbüz Aydemir, Ulaş Dil, and Yüksel Yiğitdoğan) to aggravated life imprisonment (the replacement for capital punishment, which was abolished in 2004). In March 2010, the European Court of Human Rights ruled that Yiğitdoğan had not been tried in accordance with the European Convention on Human Rights.

Detained members of TİKB have repeatedly undertaken hunger strikes (called ölüm orucu, 'death fasts'), and some have died. Haydar Başbağ and M. Fatih Öktülmüş died in 1984 while on hunger strike in Metris Prison, and Tahsin Yılmaz, Hicabi Küçük, and Osman Akgün died during a hunger strike in summer 1996. After the storming of 20 prisons on December 19, 2000, in which 30 prisoners and two soldiers were killed, TİKB prisoners joined hunger strikes that had been in progress, and those who subsequently died included TİKB members Tuncay Günel, Ali Çamyar, Lale Çolak, and Okan Külekçi.

== Publications ==
In the late 1970s, the Revolutionary Communist League published a legal periodical called Devrimci Proleterya. This was reactivated in the second half of the 1980s, when the group also published another legal periodical, Alınteri ('Effort'), and Orak-Cekiç, which was illegal. There were several police raids and legal proceedings against Alınteri, resulting in suspensions of publication, fines, and imprisonment of reporters and the editor in chief. In some cases, readers of a legal TİKB publication were arrested on suspicion of membership of the illegal organization.

In 1989 Yaşar Ayaşlı, a leading member of the TİKB, published a book titled Adressiz Sorgular ('Unaddressed Interrogations'), in which he recounted his withstanding torture after his arrest in 1985. The book was confiscated and both Ayaşlı and the publisher, Ünsal Öztürk, were charged with Communist propaganda, disrespecting the security forces, and praising a criminal act, but were released in March 1990. Former friends later accused Ayaşlı of harming the organization by making inaccurate statements in the book. A revised version of the book was published in 2014 by an authorial collective under the name of Osman Yaşar Yoldaşçan, who was killed in Istanbul in September 1980 while making armed resistance against arrest. A 2006 movie with the same title was banned in Turkey.

Nevin Berktaş published a book titled Hücreler ('Cells') in 2000, recounting her experiences while imprisoned in Adana after being accused of being a member of TİKB-B following the 1980 coup and sentenced to 18 years in prison. In 2010 she was sentenced to 10 months in prison for publishing "propaganda for a terrorist organization" in the form of the book. In February 2011, she was released after the European Court of Human Rights ruled that the sentence was a violation of freedom of speech.

== See also ==
- List of communist parties
- List of anti-revisionist groups
