= Aiming stone =

Stele erected in the Ottoman age to mark a record in archery

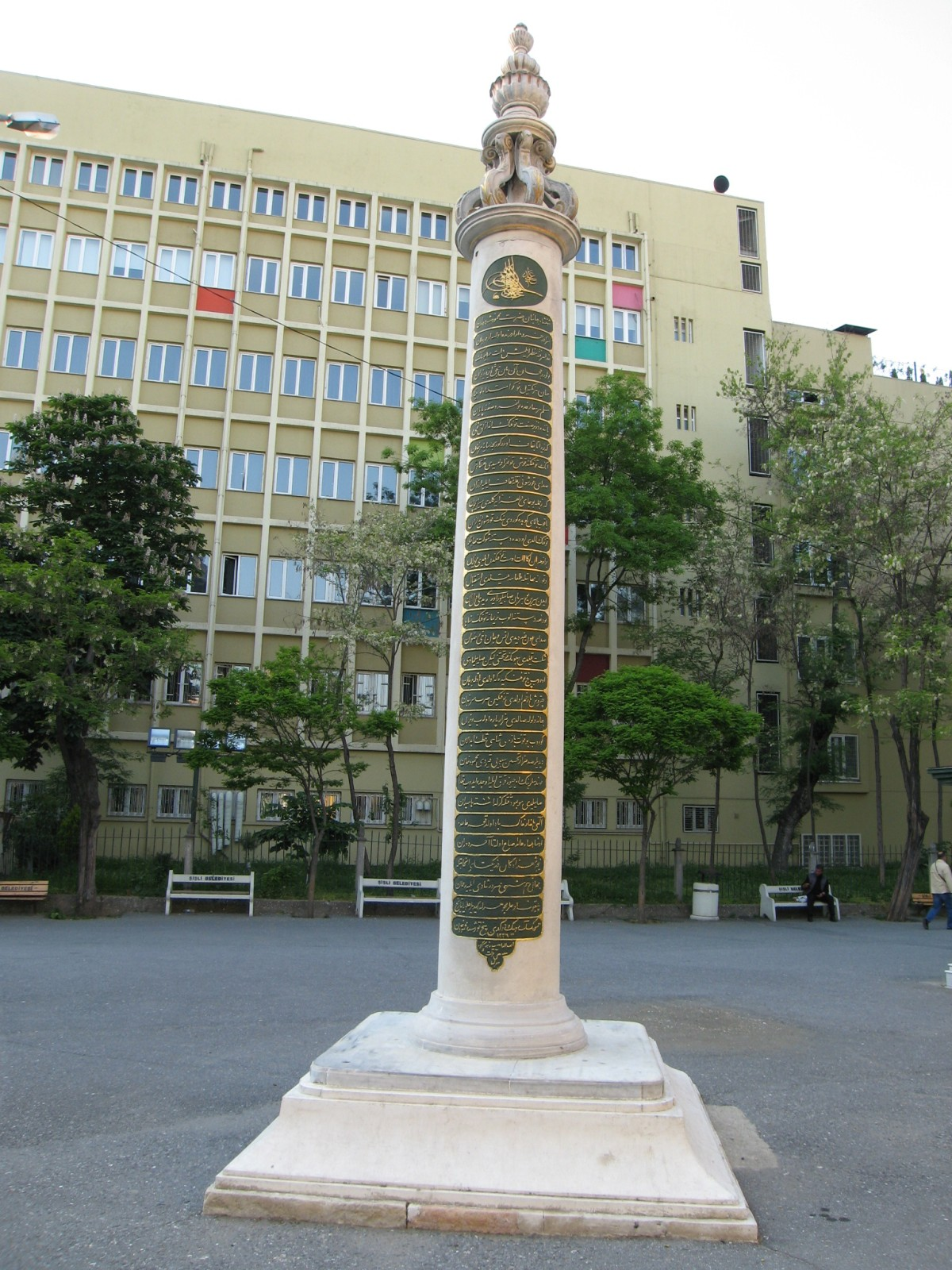
Nişan taşı of Selim III, erected in the courtyard of the Teşvikiye Mosque, Nişantaşı, Istanbul

An aiming stone (Turkish: nişan taşı or nişantaşı), also named in English target stone or range stone, is an inscribed stone stele erected in the Ottoman age to mark a record in archery (and later rifle or other weapons) shooting. When erected by a high dignitary or a sultan, the stele bears often an artistic and literary significance. While about three hundred such stelae existed in Istanbul at the end of the Ottoman Empire, only about 40 are still extant today.

== Description ==
Aiming stones were carved in the form of a stele or column, and bore engraved on the part of them facing the shot the identity and occupation of the archer, the distance, and the date of the shot. If a high dignitary, a vizier, or the sultan himself was the author of the record, the nişan taşı assumed the appearance of a veritable monument, often bearing engraved poetic compositions in Ottoman Turkish praising the archer's skills. There were 300 aiming stones in Istanbul's shooting range at the end of the Ottoman era; of these only 40 have survived. One of Istanbul's most important neighborhoods, Nişantaşı, took its name from the numerous shooting stones in the area.

== The nişan taşı in archery ==
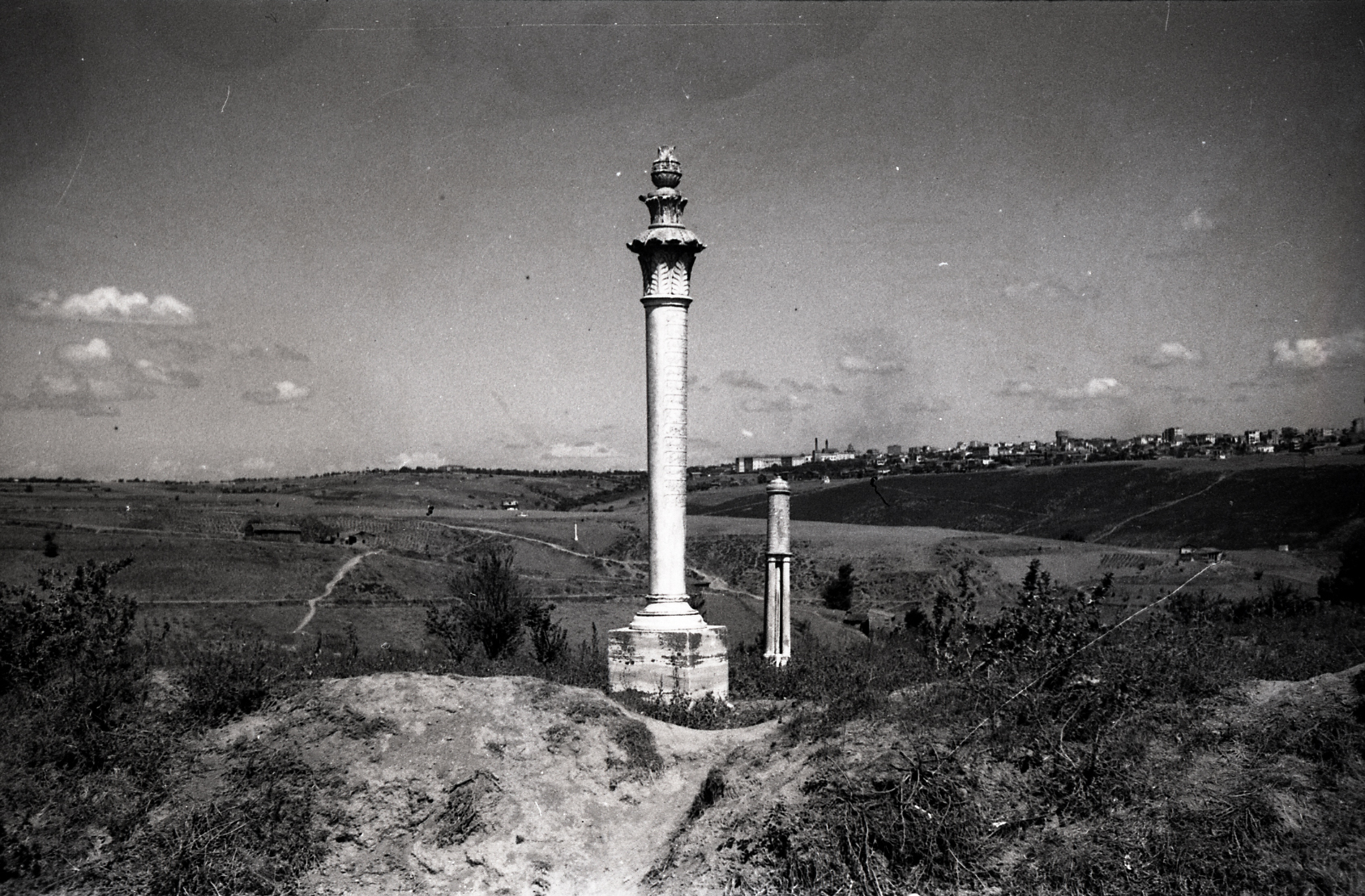
Two aiming stones in the Okmeydanı, Istanbul.

Archery was one among the sports disciplines practiced by the Ottomans. The discipline was subdivided into field shooting and distance shooting. The aim of the latter specialty was to shoot an arrow as far as possible. This activity was practiced in specially designated shooting ranges, which were administered by a foundation (Turkish: vakıf). The first shooting ranges arguably date back to the early 15th century and were located in the first two Ottoman capitals, Bursa and Edirne. In Istanbul, the shooting range was established by Mehmet II in the European location named after it Okmeydanı ("arrow field"). At the Okmeydanı also settled the tekke of shooters, organised according to the precepts of Ahi Evran (a bektashi sufi founder of the Ahi brotherhood). After the founding of this shooting range, the popularity of this sport, which was particularly prestigious among the military, increased, especially during the reign of Sultans Bayezid II and Suleiman the Magnificent.

Those who wished to try their hand at this discipline first had to become the apprentice of a master archer. In addition, he was assigned another archer, called a "brother," from whom he was to learn good manners. The purpose of the training, which began with a ceremony called the "little grip", was to learn how to shoot arrows of the pişrev type at 900 gez (547 m) and arrows of the azmayiş type at 800 gez (486 m) distance. If this took place in the presence of four witnesses, the apprentice archer's name would be entered in the register of the Okçular Tekkesi ("the archers' lodge") and after the acceptance ceremony (Turkish: icazet), known as the "great grip," he would become a registered archer (Turkish: defterli). The archer's ultimate goal, however, was to set a distance record in the range, a record that would be remembered with an aiming stone (Turkish: nişan taşı).

The shots were taken in the direction of the prevailing wind that day, and were named after it. The archer, however, was not free to shoot where he wanted, and the lodge administration would decide whether or not shooting in that direction could be permitted. The presence of an old nişan taşı in the same direction, the proximity to the boundaries of the ground, and the possibility of confusion with other records were all conditions that caused the attempt to be prohibited. Once permission was obtained, the archer would gather a low pile of stones (Turkish: ayak taşı, "foot stone") on the spot from where he would shoot the arrow. At this point, he first had to shoot beyond the minimum distances of 800 and 900 gez with the two types of arrows allowed. Once this was done, a basic stone (Turkish: ana taşı) was erected at the place where one of the arrows had landed, and that was the direction in which the archer would shoot to seek the record. It was also possible to try to beat the existing record attested by an existing nisantasi, but permission had to be sought from the waqf for this as well. For the record to be validated, the presence of four people was required: two witnesses at the ayak taşı (the ayak şahidi, i.e., the foot witnesses), and two observers at the ana taşı, called havacı. To be valid, the landing spot of the shot had to be no more than 30 gez (18 m) away from the line joining the two stones. If all these conditions were met, and the distance traveled set a record for that direction, a pile of stones would be erected at the site of the arrow drop, replaced within six months by a new nişan taşı.

In addition to solo shoots to set a record, competitions between archers (Turkish: ok koşusu) were possible, which took place in places other than the ok meydani. In this case, a target was used, which was placed progressively farther away until only one archer remained in the competition. On the corresponding nişan taşı were engraved the distance, date and name of the winner and the other participants.

=== Aiming stones for other types of shooting ===
Over time, archery competitions were joined by rifle shooting competitions. In this case, chicken eggs, ostrich eggs and jars filled with water were used as targets. From the remaining inscriptions, it has been calculated that one was allowed to shoot a hen's egg from a minimum distance of 454 gez (276 m), while for ostrich eggs this distance amounted to 1,155 gez (702 m) and for a jar full of water to 1,361 gez (827 m). Nişan taşı were also erected to celebrate records obtained with the rifle. The shooting ranges, though, were in rural or otherwise unpopulated places, such as Gülhane, Ihlamur, Yıldız, Levent, Ayasağa (Maslak), Kağıthane, Çamlıca, Göksu, and Acibadem, so as not to injure passersby. In addition to the Nişan taşı mentioned above, one Nişan taşı survives for cannon firing (at Kağıthane), and two for club throwing (at Cephane Square and Topkapı).

== Notable shooting stones ==
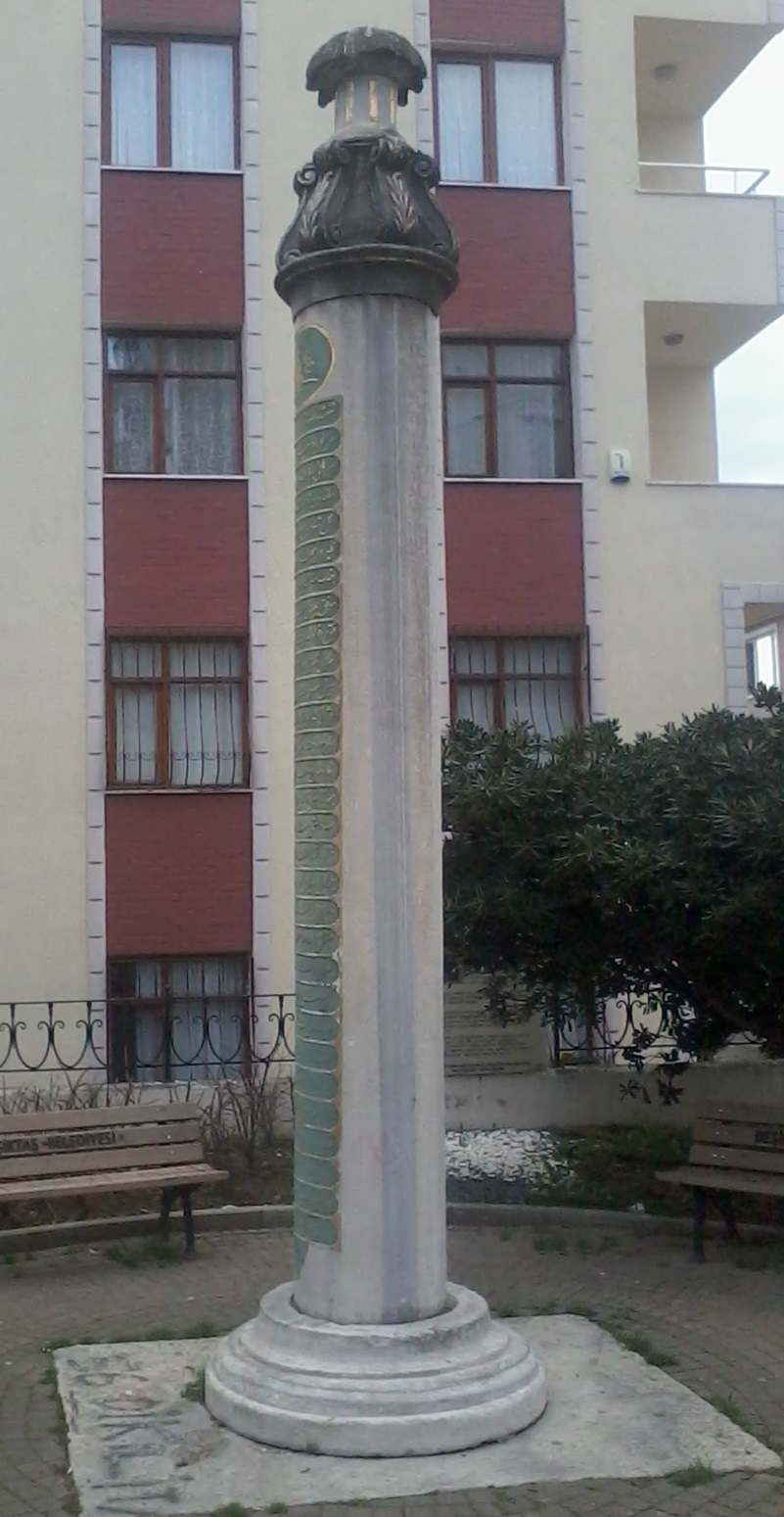
Mahmud II nişan taşı in Dilikitaş, Beşiktaş

- A shooting stone erected by Sultan Mahmud II is still preserved today in the Keçecipiri mahalle of Beyoğlu district, once part of the Okmeydanı. The foot stone of this shooting stone also remains, which is located in the Piyalepaşa mahalle. The distance between the two stones is 1,215.5 gez, or 738.31 m.
- The nişan taşı in Cephane Square (in the fifth courtyard of Topkapı) was erected to commemorate a rifle shot by Sultan Selim III, which hit a hen's egg 264 m (434 gez) away. This aiming stone is topped by a large stone cauliflower carved on a tray. Because of this, the stele is called the "Cabbage Monument" (Turkish: Lahana Abidesi).
- Two aiming stones, one by Selim III and the other by Mahmud II, were erected (the former in 1790–91, the latter in 1811) in today's courtyard of the Teşvikiye Mosque in Nişantaşı.
- The existing nişan taşı in the second courtyard of the Topkapı was erected following a record with a rifle set by Sultan Selim III in 1790.
- In 1810, in Beşiktaş Mahmud II shot an ostrich egg with a gun from a distance of 1,115 gez (735.9 m). The resulting nişan taşı, erected one year later, was named by the populace dilikitaş ("obelisk" in Turkish) and gave the name to the surrounding mahalle, Dilikitaş. The shot is commemorated on the stone by a fifteen-couplet long epigraph written by poet of the Ottoman divan Enderunlu Vasıf.
- At Kağıthane, at the western end of the Golden Horn, is still on place a nişan taşı of Mahmud II commemorating his shooting a jug full of water with a cannon at a distance of 718 gez (436.11 m). This aiming stone is made of marble, has a rectangular shape, and is inscribed on both sides with 20 couplets composed by Mehmet Said Halet Efendi, a poet, diplomat and politician of that time. Above the slab insists a marble frame framing the tughra of the sultan.

== Records ==
Some examples of notable shooting records include:

- Tozkoparan İskender: 1281 gez (845,79 m)
- Mir-i Alem Ahmed Aga: 1271,5 gez (839,18 m)
- Tozkoparan İskender: 1279 gez (844,14 m)
- Bursalı Şüca: 1243,5 gez (820,71 m)
- Mahmud II: 1228 gez (810,48 m) 1225 gez (808,5 m) 1219 gez (804,54 m)
- Çullu Ferruh: 1223 gez (807,18 m)
- Lenduha Cafer: 1209,5 gez (798,27 m)
- Parpol Hüseyin Efendi: 1207 gez (796,62 m)

== Aiming stones gallery ==
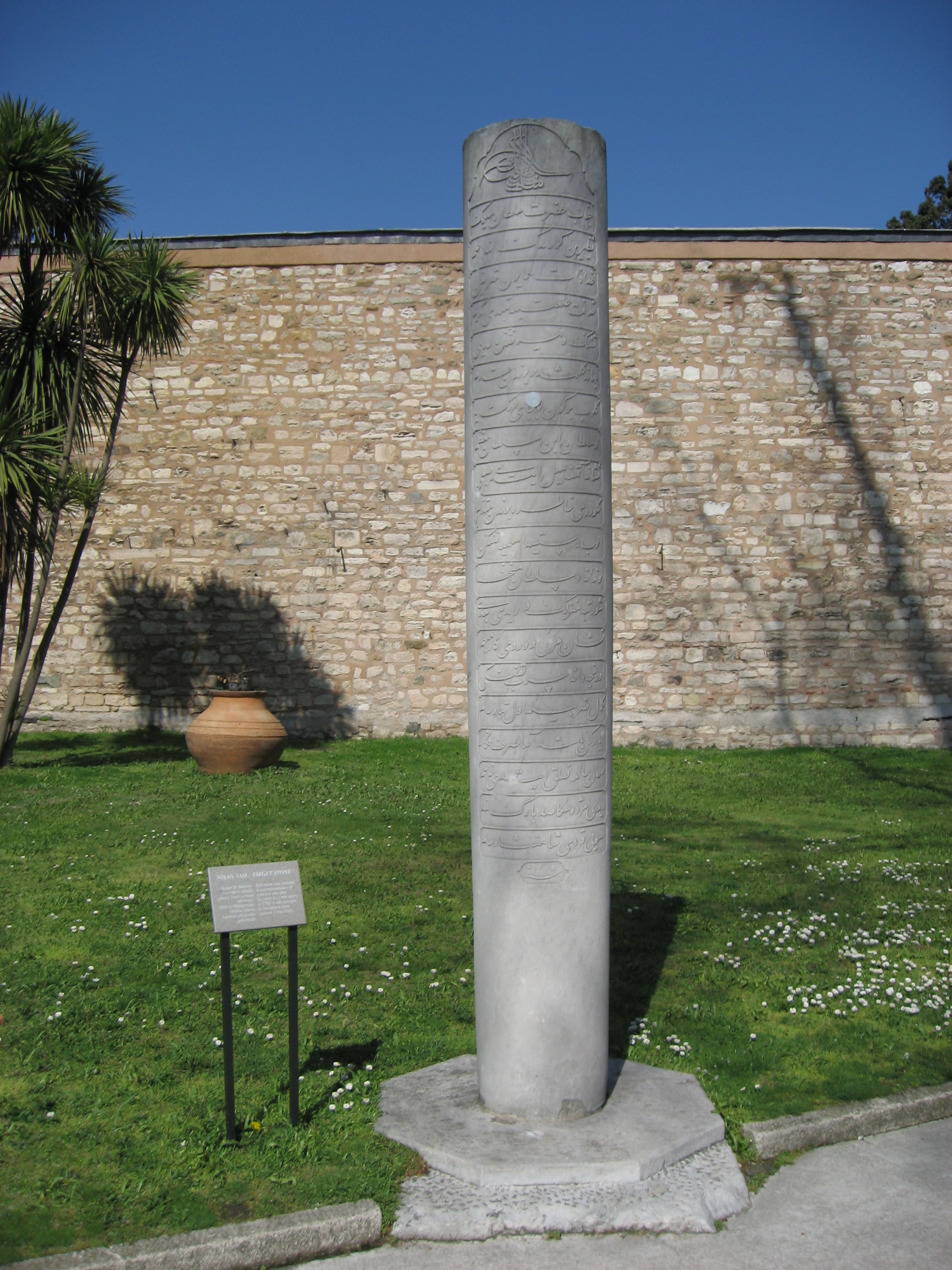
Aiming stone erected in the second courtyard of the Topkapı Palace by Selim III

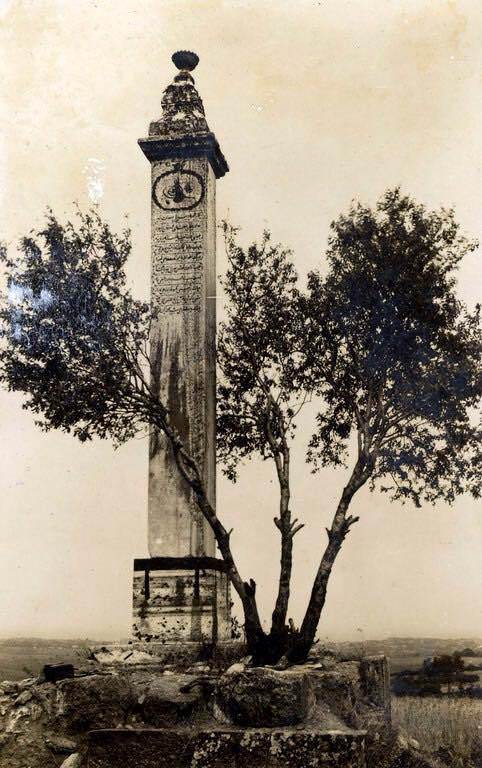
Aiming stone of Mahmud II at Acibadem, Üsküdar

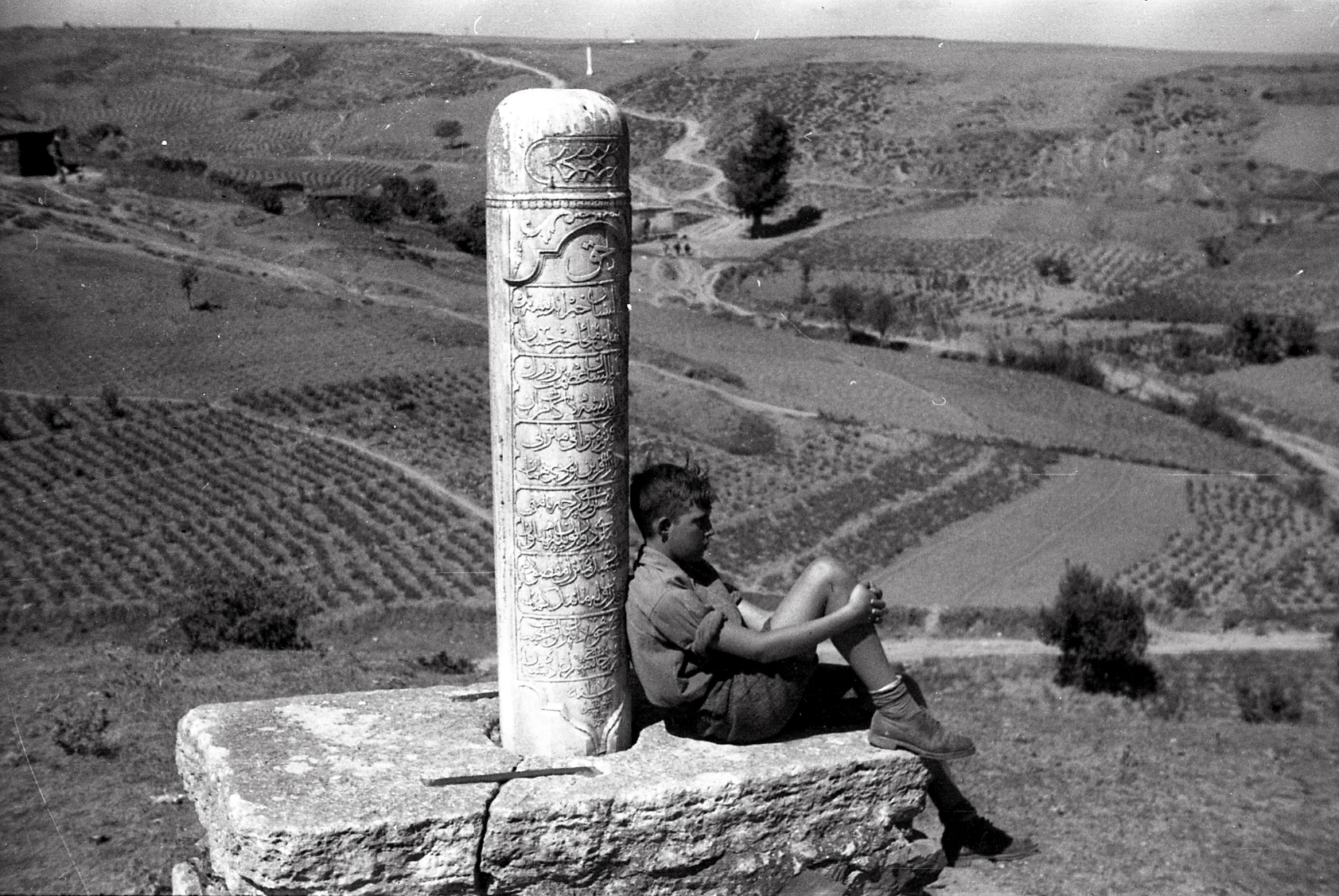
A Nişan taşı in Okmeydanı, Istanbul

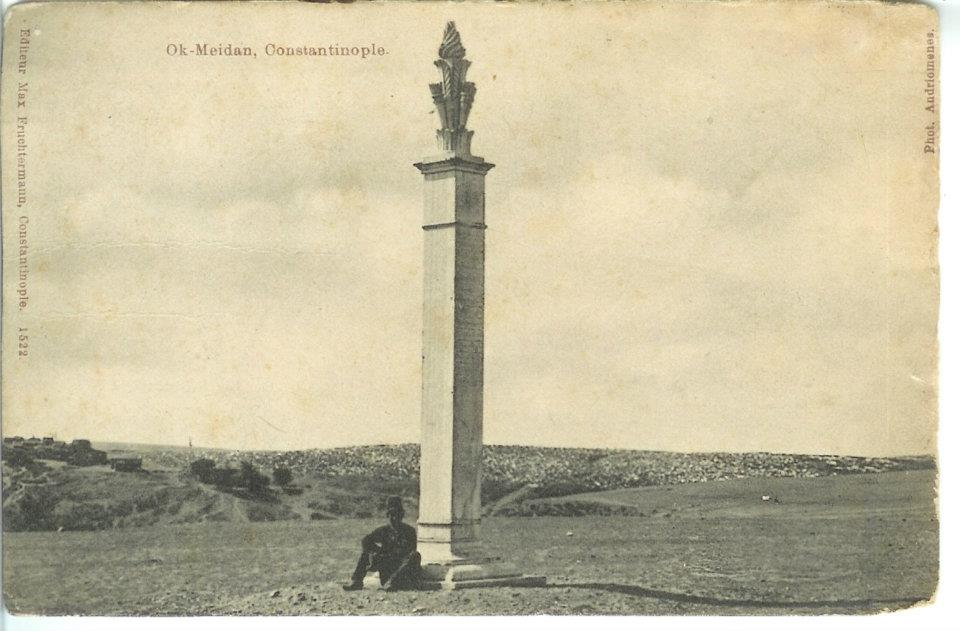
Aiming Stone of Mahmud II in Keçecipiri during late 19th century

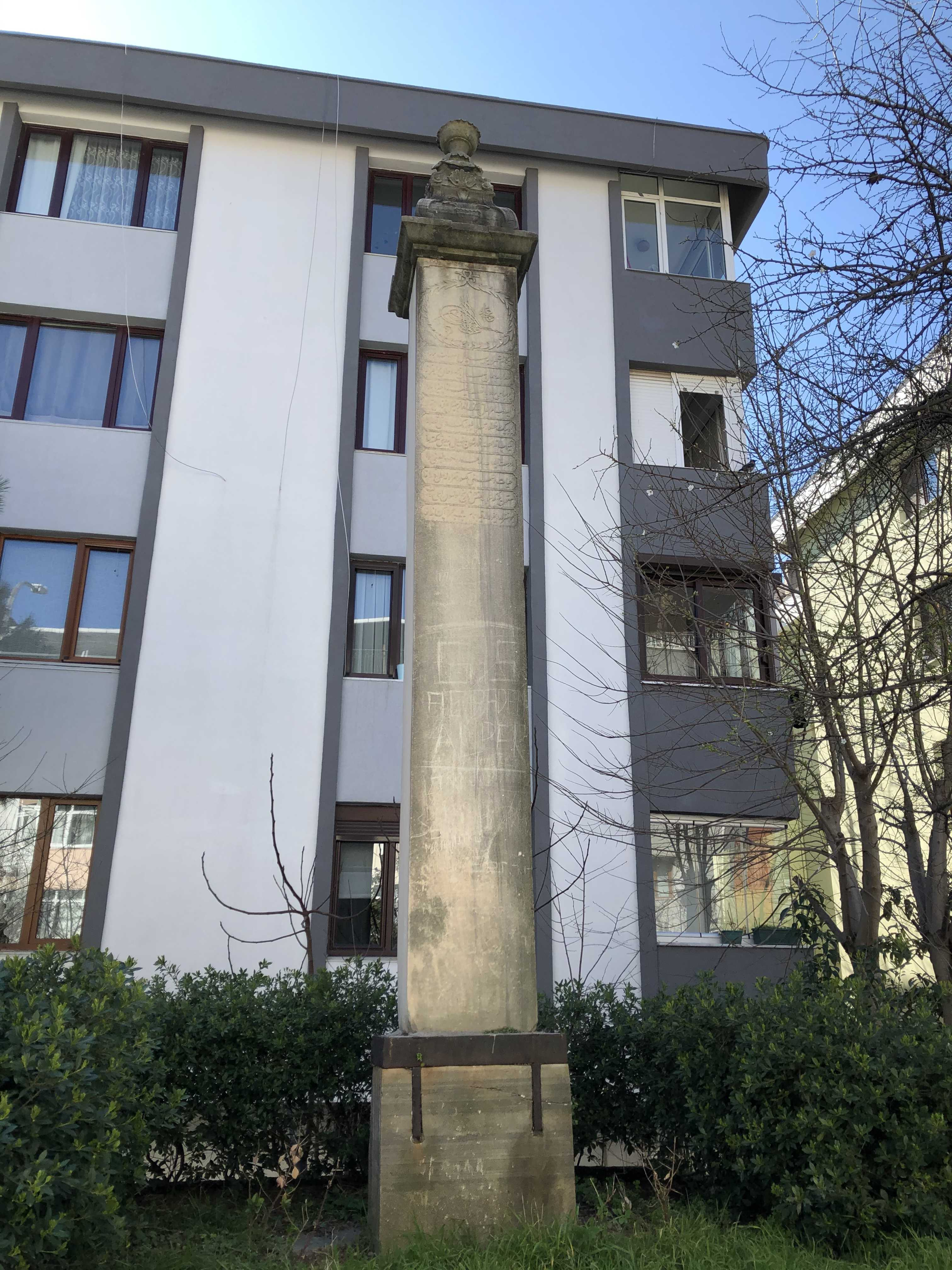
Aiming stone of Mahmud II at Acibadem, Üsküdar.
