= OSTIM Industrial Zone =

Industrial park in Ankara, Turkey

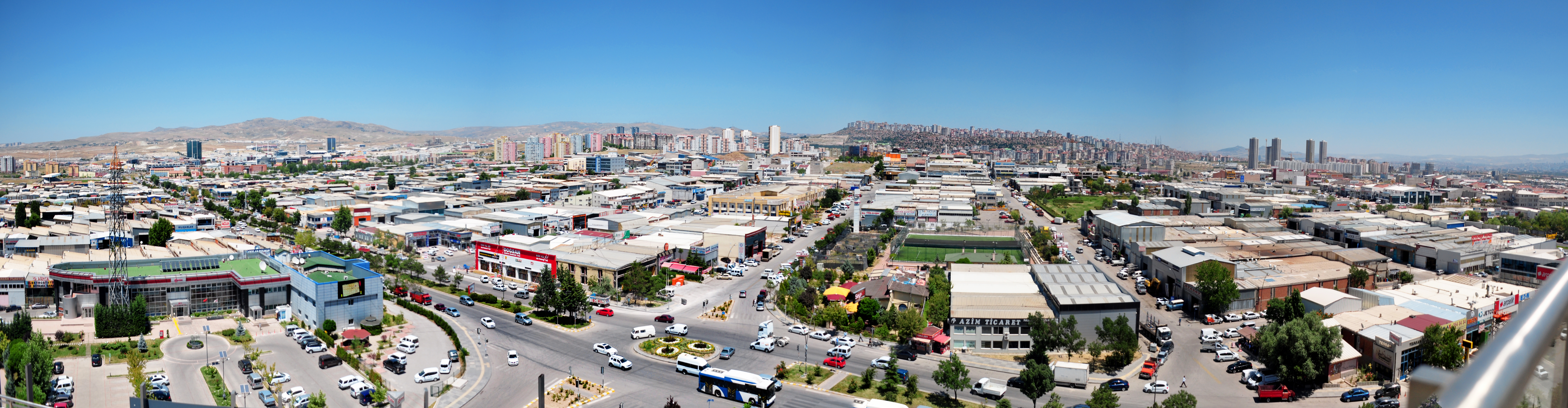
OSTİM Industrial Zone panorama

The OSTIM Industrial Zone (Ortadoğu Sanayi ve Ticaret Merkezi, OSTİM) is a large industrial park in Ankara, Turkey aimed at Small and medium enterprises (SMEs). With around 5000 companies in eight main sectors and 50,000 employees over an area of 5 million square metres, it is Turkey's largest industrial production area. It was established in the mid-1970s.

Its investment and marketing company, Ostim Endustriyel Yatirimlar ve Isletme AS, founded in 1998, is quoted on the Istanbul Stock Exchange (as OSTIM).

== See also ==
- Economy of Ankara
