= Ali İsmail Korkmaz =

Killed university student in Gezi Park protests

- Born: 18 March 1994; Hatay, Turkey
- Died: 10 July 2013 (aged 19); Eskişehir, Turkey
- Resting place: Antakya Ekinci Neighborhood Cemetery, Hatay
- Citizenship: Turkey
- Parent(s): Şehap Korkmaz; Emel Korkmaz

Ali İsmail Korkmaz (18 March 1994 – 10 July 2013) was a Turkish university student who was killed at the age of 19 after being battered by police and opposing groups who intervened in the march in which he had participated in support of the Gezi Park protests.

A freshman student at Anadolu University, Ali İsmail Korkmaz had come to the streets of Eskişehir in support of the Gezi Park protests but after being beaten by police and escaping, he was beaten and physically abused two more times by opposing groups. After being beaten, he could not be treated in the hospital he was staying in and was able to get the first medical intervention after 20 hours of being injured. Korkmaz, who had started to suffer from brain hemorrhage, remained in a coma for 38 days and died 10 July 2013. His death gave rise to protests in Eskişehir and a statue was erected in his memory.

== Reactions ==
Following Ali İsmail Korkmaz's death, protests began in various provinces of Turkey and 40 days later protesters came to streets in Hatay. Members of the "Justice" marching team, started a march from Antalya in memory of those who were killed during the Gezi Park protests and reached Eskişehir. Together with the people, they marched to the street where Ali İsmail Korkmaz was assaulted. After this protest, the team marched to Ankara, where Ethem Sarısülük, who also lost his life in the Gezi Park protests, was killed.

== Court process ==
On 2 June 2013 at a court hearing in Eskişehir about the death of the 19-year-old Korkmaz, who lost his life after a 38-day coma as a result of an attack he suffered during the Gezi Park protests, a life imprisonment sentence was requested for the 8 accused individuals.

On 21 January 2015, Mevlüt Saldoğan was sentenced to 13 years in prison for 'deliberately causing the death'. His sentence was reduced to 10 years and 10 months considering the effect on his future and his detention was decided to continue. Police officer Yalçın Akbulut was sentenced to 12 years in prison, but due to the same reasons, he was sent to prison for 10 years following his detention period. Fırıncılar İsmail, Ramazan Koyuncu and Muhammet Patansever were sentenced to 8 years of imprisonment for wounding the victim. Their penalties were reduced to 3 years and 4 months since they had only helped in committing the crime. Other police officers, Şaban Gökpınar and Hüseyin Engin, were acquitted for lack of evidence.

== Legacy ==
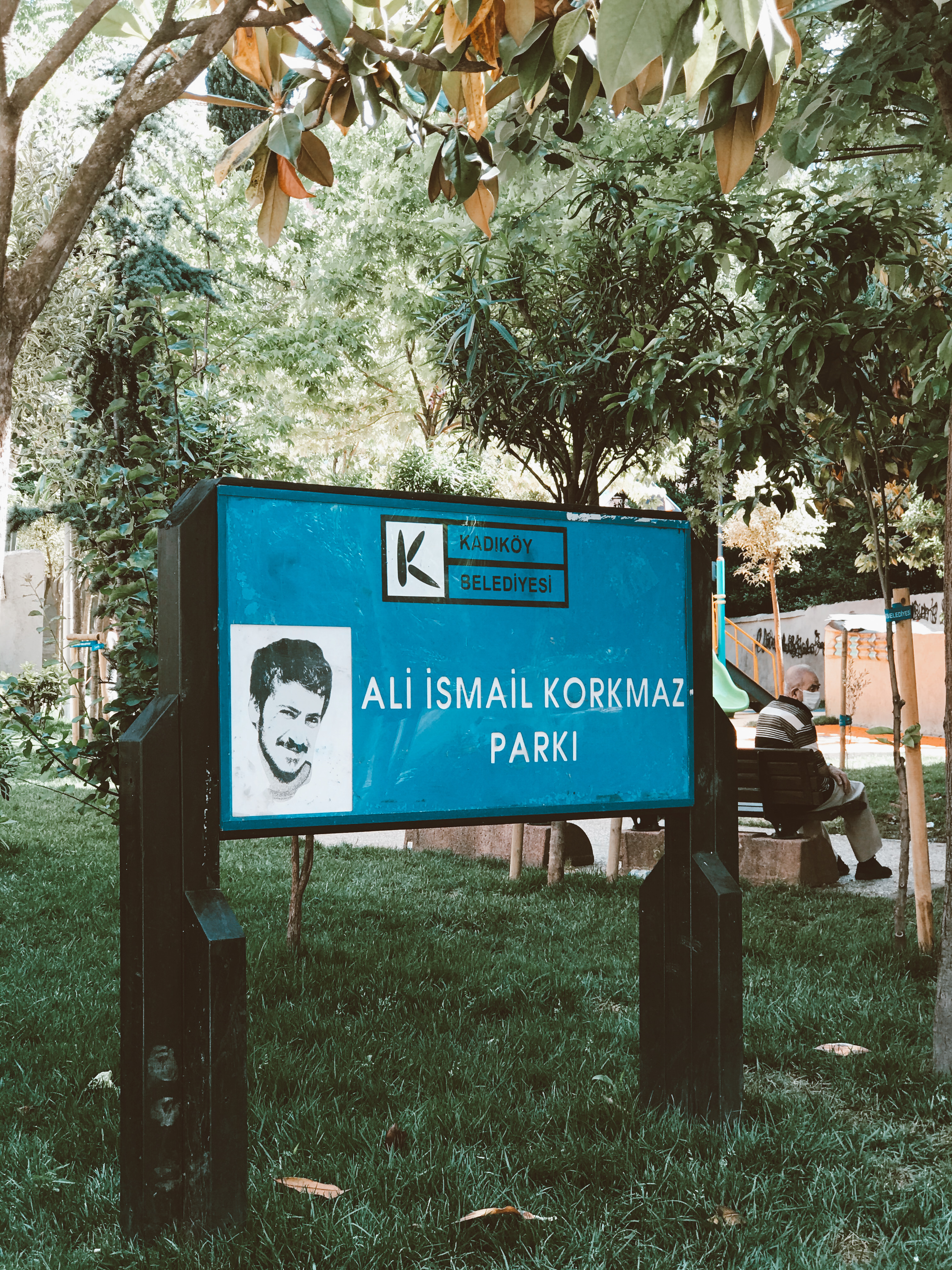
Ali İsmail Korkmaz Park (Kadıköy, İstanbul)

Ali İsmail Korkmaz's statue was erected in Eskişehir with the contribution of the Fikir Clubs Federation (FKF) after Korkmaz's death.

He was a Fenerbahçe supporter, and Fenerbahçe fans composed the "Ali İsmail Korkmaz" march and sing it at various matches.

An old car park area located in İskele Street in Rasimpaşa Neighborhood, was converted by Kadıköy Municipality into a park and named after Ali İsmail Korkmaz.

The 1907 ÜNİFEB Çukurova University organization created the Ali İsmail Korkmaz Memorial Forest in Kemerhisar.

Hatay Samandağ Municipality named a bridge in the district entrance after Ali İsmail Korkmaz.

The Ali İsmail Korkmaz Foundation, founded by the Korkmaz family, has a variety of activities that help the students, the elderly, nature, animals, artists, artisans and provides scholarships to the students.

== Court status ==
The Eskişehir 2nd Administrative Court later announced its decision about the Gezi Park protests in Eskişehir on 2 June 2013 during which Ali İsmail Korkmaz was assaulted by the police and a group of civilians and lost his life following a 38-day coma. The court sentenced the Ministry of the Interior to pay his family ₺57,180 for material damages, and ₺650,000 for moral damages for a total of ₺707,180.

Even after 10 years, the trials are still being held about other suspects in this case, one of them is the Police officer Hüseyin Engin, who was accused of "torture" by Ali Ismail's and his family's lawyers, but was found not guilty. Ali İsmail's family and lawyers brought this sentencing to the Constitutional Court of Turkey, with a series of accusations about the previous trials, saying that the Investigations and trials were not conducted properly. The Constitutional Court ruled that the suspect, Hüseyin Engin, was to be tried again. This resulted in another trial in 2023, by the 3rd Heavy Criminal Court in Kayseri, and this time Hüseyin Engin was found guilty of "simple wounding" and sentenced to 7 months and 15 days in prison, and the verdict was not witheld. After the Trial, lawyers of Korkmaz family stated that the Murder of Ali Ismail Korkmaz is still an ongoing case at the European Court of Human Rights, and that they will apply to the Court of Cassation, again accusing the suspect of torturing the victim.
