= Economy of Ankara =

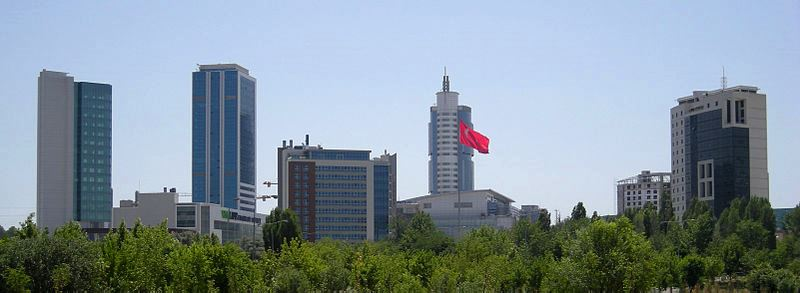
Söğütözü business district in Ankara, as seen from the Atatürk Forest Farm and Zoo, with the Armada Tower & Mall (2002) rising behind the Turkish flag.

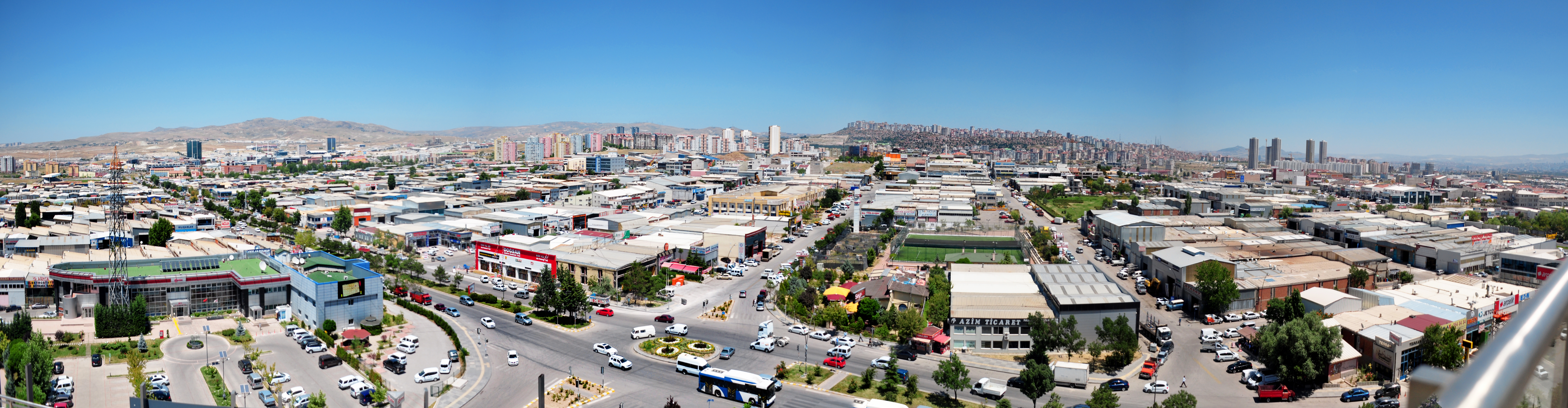
OSTIM Industrial Zone

Economy of Ankara covers the issues related to the economy of the city of Ankara, Turkey. Ankara has a historic old town, and although it is not exactly a tourist city, is usually a stop for travelers who go to Cappadocia. The city enjoys an excellent cultural life too, and has several museums. The Anıtkabir is also in Ankara. It is the mausoleum of Atatürk, the founder of the Republic of Turkey.

Ankara is the capital city of Turkey and the second largest city in the country after Istanbul. It is located at the heart of both Turkey and Central Anatolia. The population is around 4.5 million.

Ankara is the administrative center of Turkey and a huge university town, so it has a large population of government workers and university students. As the national capital, Ankara is home to a large population of foreign diplomats and embassy staff, so it offers goods and services that might be more difficult to find in other Turkish cities. Ankara is a sprawling, modern city which can appear as little more than a dull, concrete jungle at first glance. As a result, many tourists tend to use it merely as a transit point for getting to places like Konya or Cappodocia. However Ankara does have a lot to offer for those prepared to look a bit deeper. Ankara has a symbolic significance for the secular Turks. It is the place where a new era for the Turkish people started. It is a symbol for independence, development and Western values.

== See also ==
- Economy of Turkey
- OSTIM
