= Okmeydanı =

Neighborhood in Istanbul, Turkey

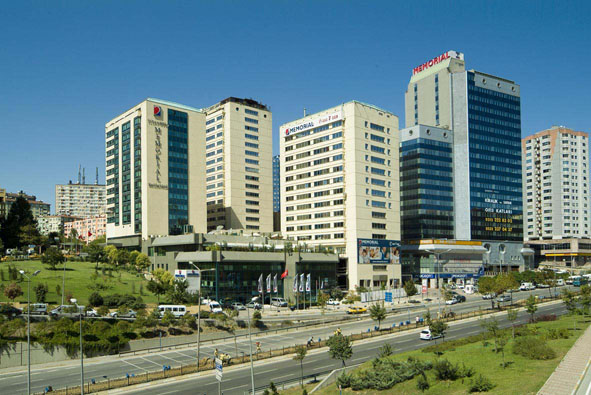
A hospital in Okmeydanı

Okmeydanı (lit. 'arrow field') is a neighbourhood connected to Kağıthane and Şişli boroughs of Istanbul, Turkey. It was named after the archery area and archery lodge built by Sultan Mehmed II of the Ottoman Empire. Streets nearby have targeting stones to define the distances of the arrows. During the plague outbreak of 1597, people met in Okmeydanı for three weeks of communal prayers for deliverance from the disease by order of Sultan Mehmed III.

The most land titles of this neighbourhood are mostly owned by Fatih Sultan Mehmet Foundation, thus the buildings in the area were subject to deconstruction now and then. Currently, it consists of many important commercial and state buildings and is an important crossroad for the local transportation system.

== Sources ==
- Taylor, Jane (2007). Imperial Istanbul. I.B. Tauris. p. 192. ISBN 978-1-84511-334-6.
- Ekrem, Selma (1947). Turkey, Old and New. Charles Scribner's Sons. p. 122.
