= Osman Orsal =

Turkish photographer

Osman Orsal is a Turkish photo-journalist for the international news agency Reuters. Orsal resides in Istanbul, Turkey.

== Career ==
On 28 May 2013, Orsal covered the 2013 protests in Turkey, capturing an iconic set of images of the protests. The images show a young protester (later nicknamed the "woman in red"), a young woman in a red dress, as she stands her ground while she is sprayed by a policeman. The Washington Post reported that the image "encapsulates Turkey’s protests and the severe police crackdown", while Reuters called the image an "iconic leitmotif". Protesters later re-used the image in posters, accompanied by the slogan "The more you spray the bigger we get".

On 29 May, Orsal was injured by police when he was struck in the head by a gas canister. A photograph of Orsal, with blood streaming down his face, was widely distributed.
