= Ethem Sarısülük =

- Born: 11 July 1986; Sungurlu, Çorum
- Died: 14 June 2013 (aged 26); Kızılay, Ankara
- Cause of death: Gunshot wound
- Resting place: Beylice, Sungurlu, Çorum
- Citizenship: Turkey
- Occupations: Worker, activist
- Parent(s): Muzaffer Sarısülük; Sayfi Sarısülük

Ethem Sarısülük (11 July 1986 – 14 June 2013) was an activist and worker who was killed by the police in Ankara during the 2013 Gezi Park protests. Sarısülük, who was seriously injured by police officer Ahmet Şahbaz during the Gezi Park protests in Ankara, stayed in intensive care unit for 14 days. He was diagnosed with brain death on 12 June 2013 and died in Ankara Numune Hospital on 14 June 2013 at 3:15 pm. In the autopsy report it was stated that the bullet which killed him was found inside the brain.

== Life ==
Sarısülük was born on 11 July 1986 in Sungurlu, Çorum, to family of a Turkmen Alevi origin. In 1991, he moved to Ankara together with his family. His father, Muzaffer Sarısülük, was a literature teacher. However, he resigned and started to live alone in the countryside of Çorum due to various reasons. His father lives a life far from technology and practices vegetarianism. His mother, Sayfı, provided for the family by working as a cleaner. He had a poor childhood with three brothers and one sister. He completed his primary education in Kınık Primary School and started his high school education in Abidinpaşa Industrial Vocational High School; but did not continue his studies. Then he started going to Tuzluçayır High School; but left in the second grade. He was detained during the free education protests at this school. After high school he worked in various sectors such as transporting cargo and worked in OSTİM as a welding worker. For a while, he took part at a police station construction in Hakkâri.

== Death ==
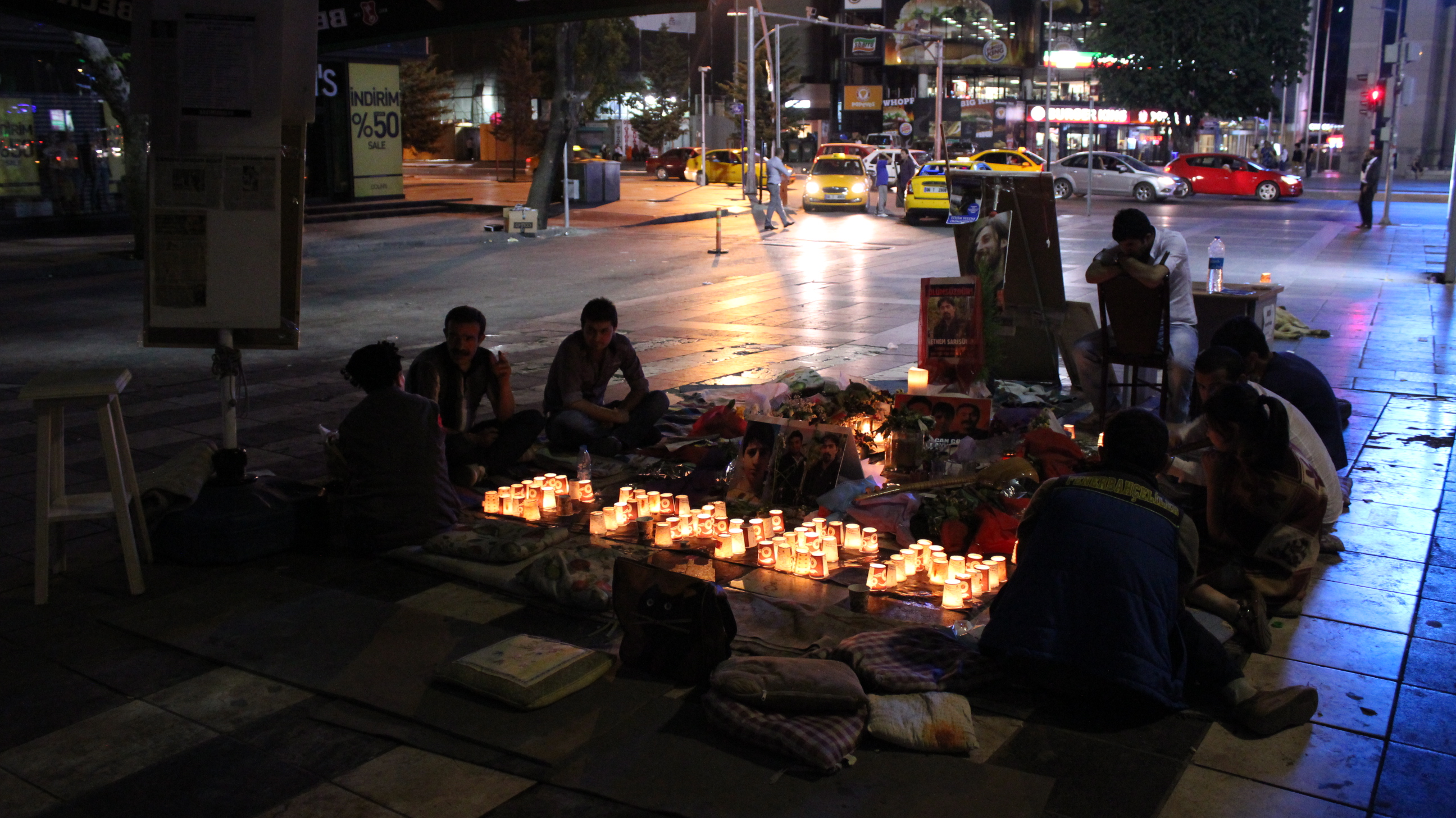
A memorial made in Kızılay at the point where Ethem Sarısülük was shot

On 1 June, Sarısülük was wounded with a bullet shot by police officer Ahmet Şahbaz during the Gezi Park protests. In a few days all of his organs stopped functioning and he died 13 days later. 7 days after his family filed a criminal complaint, the area in which he was shot was reconnoitered.

His body was sent to the Keçiören Forensic Medicine Institute for an autopsy. Apart from experts, the family's lawyers, Kazım Bayraktar and Teoman Özkan, joined the prosecutor and an observing expert for the autopsy. The process was recorded in the form of photos and videos. A 9-mm-bullet was removed from his brain. The bullet was estimated to have been fired at a distance of 4.8 meters. His family wanted to donate his organs; however, this request was not approved as the organs had become unusable following the autopsy.

On 3 September 2014, it was decided that the suspect, police officer Ahmet Şahbaz, was to be sentenced to 7 years and 9 months of imprisonment; consisting of a 1-year probation and 4 years and 2 months in prison. However, on 8 December 2014, the Chief Public Prosecutor's Office of the Supreme Court of Appeals, requested the sentence to be changed as the defendant Şahbaz had committed "willful murder" by "targeting the group in front of him and deliberately shooting them".

== Funeral ==
On 16 June 2013, at 12:30 in Kızılay, the crowd was gathered for the funeral of Sarısülük. The police did not allow the funeral authorities to assemble in Kızılay for the commemoration ceremony. Police and gendarmerie teams closed the road at Batıkent junction when the funeral ceremony was taking place in Kızılay. People who had come to Kızılay for Sarısülük's funeral, left flowers at the spot in which Sarısülük was shot. The police intervened with people who wanted to take part in the commemoration ceremony. Water cannons and tear gas were used to disperse the crowd. A number of people were injured in the incident and two people were hit in the head by tear gas canister. Over 100 people were detained during the incident and Sarısülük's body was taken to the village of Beylice in the town of Sungurlu in Çorum with the vehicle of Çankaya Municipality. CHP representative from Tunceli, Hüseyin Aygün, Çorum's representative, Tufan Köse, and various institutions and organizations participated in the funeral ceremony. The ceremony was carried out by the Çorum branch of the Hacı Bektaş Veli Foundation and followed the Alevi-Bektaşi tradition and custom.

== Claims ==
Established in 1979 as an illegal organization after the division of THKO, the TİKB issued a statement on its official website, following the death of Ethem Sarısülük. In this statement, it was alleged that Sarısülük was a member of the Turkey Revolutionary Communist League.

== Reactions ==
To commemorate Ethem Sarısülük and to protest against the release of the police who killed Sarısülük, KESK Istanbul Branches Platform, DİSK Istanbul Representative Office, Istanbul Medical Chamber, and TMMOB Istanbul Branch called for thousands of people to gather in Taksim Square.

His elder brother, Mustafa Sarısülük, was a nominee from HDP at the November 2015 Turkish general election to represent Ankara's 2nd district.

== Legacy ==
In July 2013, a park was named after him in the Batıkent neighborhood of Yenimahalle district in Ankara. In the same year, a library was created in his name in Mamak, Ankara.

In 2013, Mordoğan Theater Festival in Mordoğan, İzmir, was dedicated to Ethem Sarısülük's memory. Singer Alpay composed the song "Ethem'in Sessiz Çığlığı" in honor of Ethem Sarısülük and all those who had lost their lives during the Gezi Park protests. Director Gürkan Hacır also made a documentary about Ethem Sarısülük's life, titled Haziran Yangını. The film was released on 12 June 2015.
