= Gezi Park =

Urban park in Istanbul, Turkey

Taksim Gezi Park
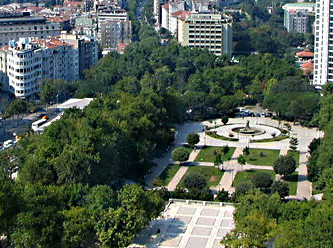
- Taksim Gezi Park
- Interactive map of Taksim Gezi Park
- Type: Urban park
- Location: Istanbul, Turkey
- Coordinates: 41°02′18″N 28°59′13″E
- Area: 9.88 acres (4.00 ha)
- Created: 1943
- Operator: Istanbul Metropolitan Municipality
- Open: All year

Gezi Park is an urban park next to Taksim Square, in Istanbul's Beyoğlu district (historically known as Pera). It is one of the last green spaces in Beyoğlu and one of the smallest parks of Istanbul. In May 2013, plans to replace the park with a reconstruction of the former Taksim Military Barracks (demolished in 1940), intended to house a shopping mall, sparked the nationwide 2013 protests in Turkey.

== History ==
The Taksim Gezi Park is located at the former site of the Halil Pasha Artillery Barracks, a large square-shaped military barracks complex constructed in 1806 with an extensive open drill-ground. near the "Frank and Armenian burial grounds", or the former Grand Champs des Morts.

Armenian tombstones from the Pangaltı Armenian Cemetery, discovered in 2013 during the excavations for the pedestrianization project of Taksim Square. The cemetery was located on the northern section of Taksim Gezi Park.

From 1560 to 1939 the Pangaltı Armenian Cemetery was located on the northern section of today's Gezi Park, at the vicinity of the Surp Agop Hospital. The land plot of the cemetery was confiscated by the Turkish government as part of Henri Prost's plans to build Taksim Gezi Park and it was subsequently demolished in 1939. In 2013, during excavations conducted for the tunnel of Cumhuriyet Avenue as part of the pedestrianization project of Taksim Square, 16 tombstones from the cemetery were discovered.

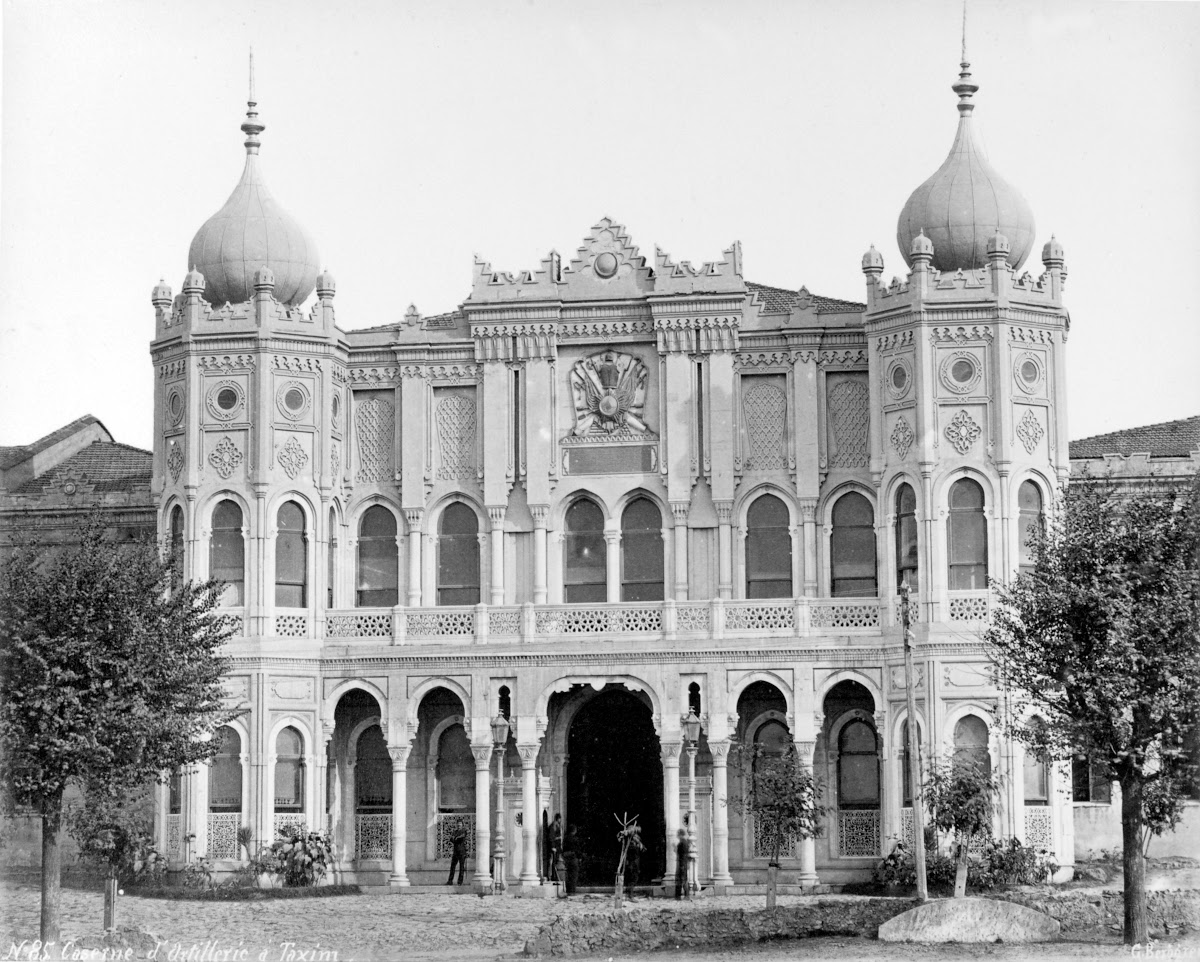
One of the main entrance gates, designed in Orientalist style, of the Halil Pasha Artillery Barracks (1806) which was transformed into Taksim Stadium in 1921. The building was demolished between 1939 and 1940 to be replaced by the southern section of Taksim Gezi Park.

Known in the 19th century as the Grand Artillery Barracks at Pera, the Halil Pasha Artillery Barracks complex (Turkish: Halil Paşa Topçu Kışlası) was built in 1806. The facade of the barracks was designed in the late Ottoman architecture, with Orientalist style details such as onion domes on the monumental entrance gates, which didn't belong to classical Ottoman architecture. The barracks suffered considerable damage during the 31 March Incident in 1909. The barracks, which was later transformed into Taksim Stadium in 1921, was demolished between 1939 and 1940 as part of Henri Prost's plans to build Taksim Gezi Park.

In 1936 the French architect and city planner Henri Prost (1874–1959) was invited to Turkey by President Mustafa Kemal Atatürk. He was tasked with the preparation of Istanbul's rough-cut urban planning and rebuilding, which lasted until 1951. In accordance with Prost's plans for Taksim Square, which he completed in 1939, the barracks buildings were demolished between 1939 and 1940 by the city governor and mayor Lütfi Kırdar (in office 1938–1949). Prost described the place before demolition as following:

The area included the old remains of an old cemetery, several jerry-built garage buildings, a barracks in ruins, and a number of shops and cafés around the square where the monument was located.

In 1921 the internal courtyard of the barracks was rearranged and used as the Taksim Stadium. The Turkish national football team played their first ever official international match in this stadium, against Romania, on October 26, 1923, which ended up with a 2–2 draw. The soccer matches were discontinued on March 25, 1940.

Prost's master city plan, which came into force in 1939, provided for a much larger Taksim Gezi Park with continuous green space, which he called Park No. 2, covering an area of 30 ha (74 acres) between the neighborhoods of Taksim, Nişantaşı and Maçka extending to Bosphorus including the Dolmabahçe Valley. The larger park was intended to offer green space for recreation to Istanbul's residents and tourists, but it has never been completely realized.

The construction of Taksim Gezi Park was completed in 1943, and it was opened under the name "İnönü Esplanade" in honor of the second Turkish president İsmet İnönü (in office 1938–1950) by Lütfi Kırdar personally. The area of the park diminished in later years with the construction of big hotels in the outlying zone. Nevertheless, the park remained an important recreational area within the downtown of the city, and its appearance was improved after restoration.

== 2013 protests against redeveloping the site ==
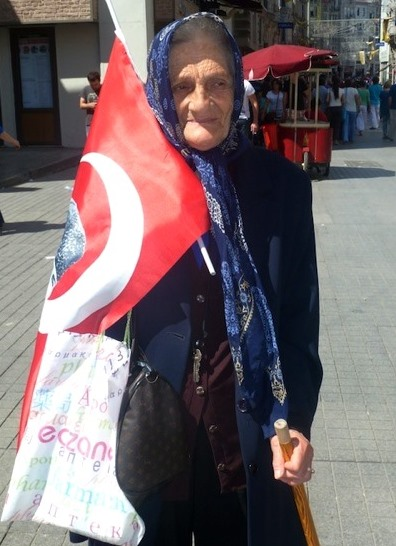
An elderly woman with Turkish flag on Taksim Square during the 2013 protests

From 28 May 2013 protests began to occur against plans to replace Taksim Gezi Park with a shopping mall and possible residence. The protests developed into riots when a group began occupying Taksim square and the police tried to suppress the demonstrations. The subjects of the protests have since broadened beyond the development of Taksim Gezi Park. The protestors did not have a predetermined, concrete agenda, other than stopping the demolition of Gezi park, and this was nowhere more visible than in the ever‐changing list of demands presented to the government by Taksim Solidarity Platform (Taksim Dayanışma Platformu), the only body which came close to representing the diverse crowds of protesters - rich, poor, LGBT, Turks, Kurds, Sunni and Alevi. Issues such as freedom of assembly and freedom of expression, as well as more broadly defending the secularism of Turkey coexisted with the protests of anti-capitalist Muslims against the economic neoliberalism of the government. The protests also spread to other cities in Turkey, and protests were seen in other countries with significant Turkish communities.

On 31 May 2013, police suppressed the protesters with tear gas and pressurized water. The police action received wide attention online.

Following the protests the Istanbul-based platform InEnArt presented Urban Voices which opens a critical view on cultural practices and phenomena that expresses the ethos, aspirations, and dreams of a specific population during a well-defined era and that triggered dramatic cultural changes in the past. One section of Urban Voices focuses on the protest culture in Turkey as described with the neologism Çapuling. It describes and reflects the visual culture, humor and irony of the peaceful protestors (the Çapulcu) as it developed in many forms in Turkey during 2013.

As of 10 September 2013, eight people had lost their lives in the protests: Mehmet Ayvalıtaş (20), Abdullah Cömert (22), Ethem Sarısülük (26), İrfan Tuna (47), Selim Önder (88), Ali İsmail Korkmaz (19), Berkin Elvan (14), Ahmet Atakan (22) and Police officer Mustafa Sarı (27), who fell from a bridge while in pursuit of demonstrators. A further 8,500+ were injured and twelve lost an eye, after being hit by teargas grenades and police's interventions. Police received widespread criticism for, among other things, using tear gas within buildings. The Koç Holding, which had supported the demonstrators by giving them sanctuary in one of their hotels near Taksim was then subject to a tax investigation.

== 2014 anniversary of Gezi Park protests ==
Police used tear gas and water cannons against demonstrators, and people were detained and/or injured, on 31 May 2014 in Istanbul, Ankara, and other cities.

== Gallery ==
Taksim Gezi Park

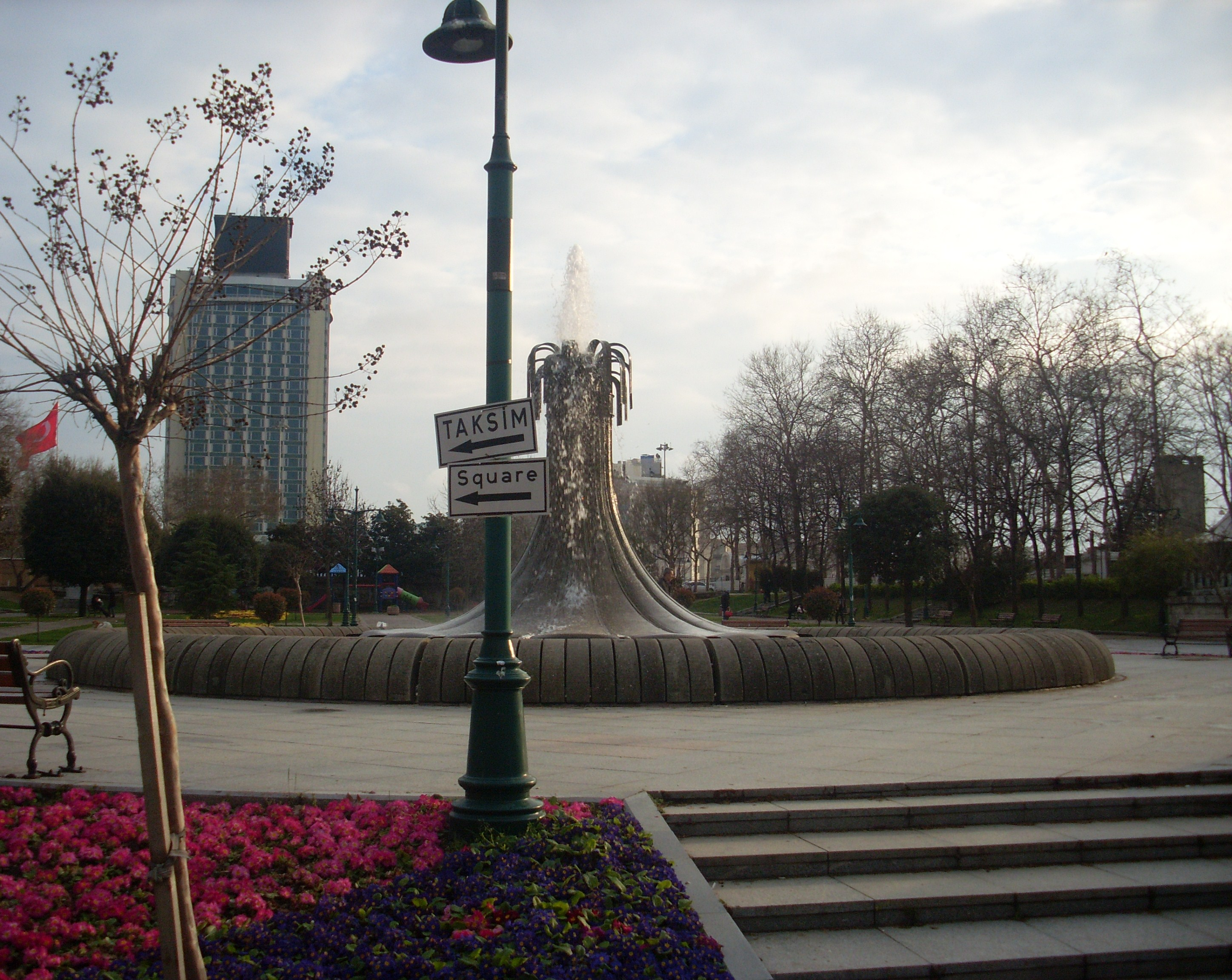
Taksim Gezi Park (March 2013)

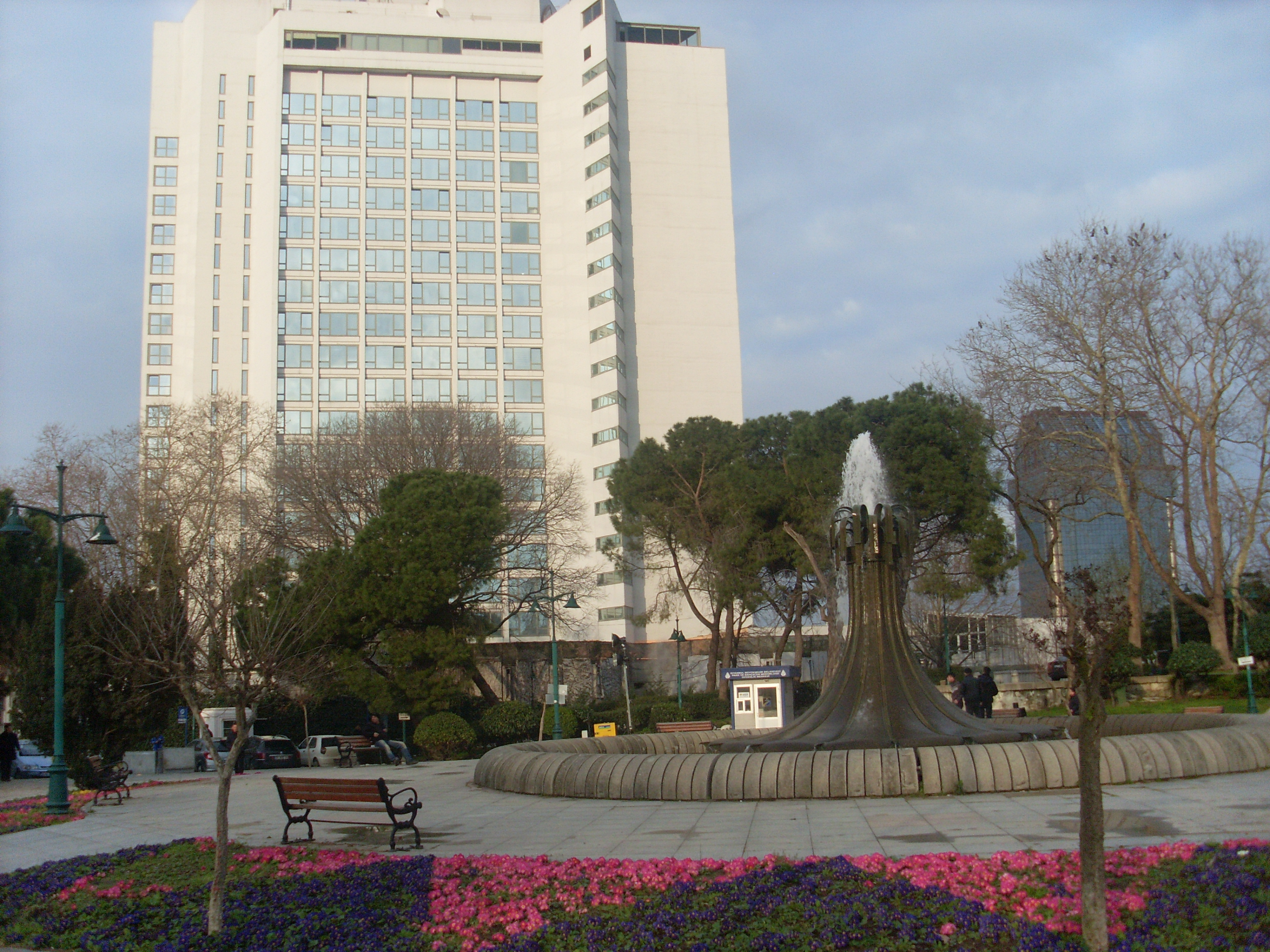
Taksim Gezi Park (March 2013)

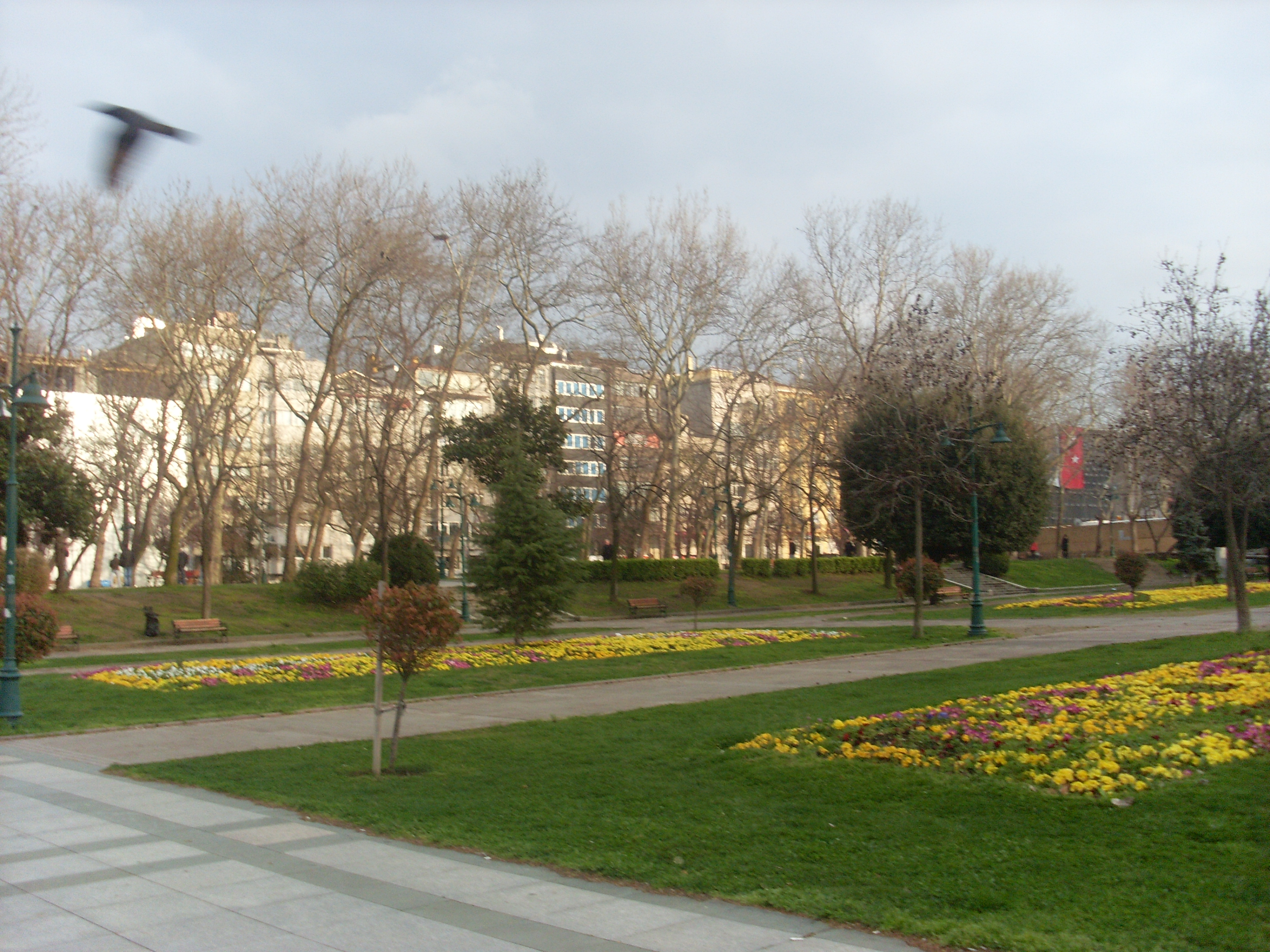
Taksim Gezi Park (March 2013)

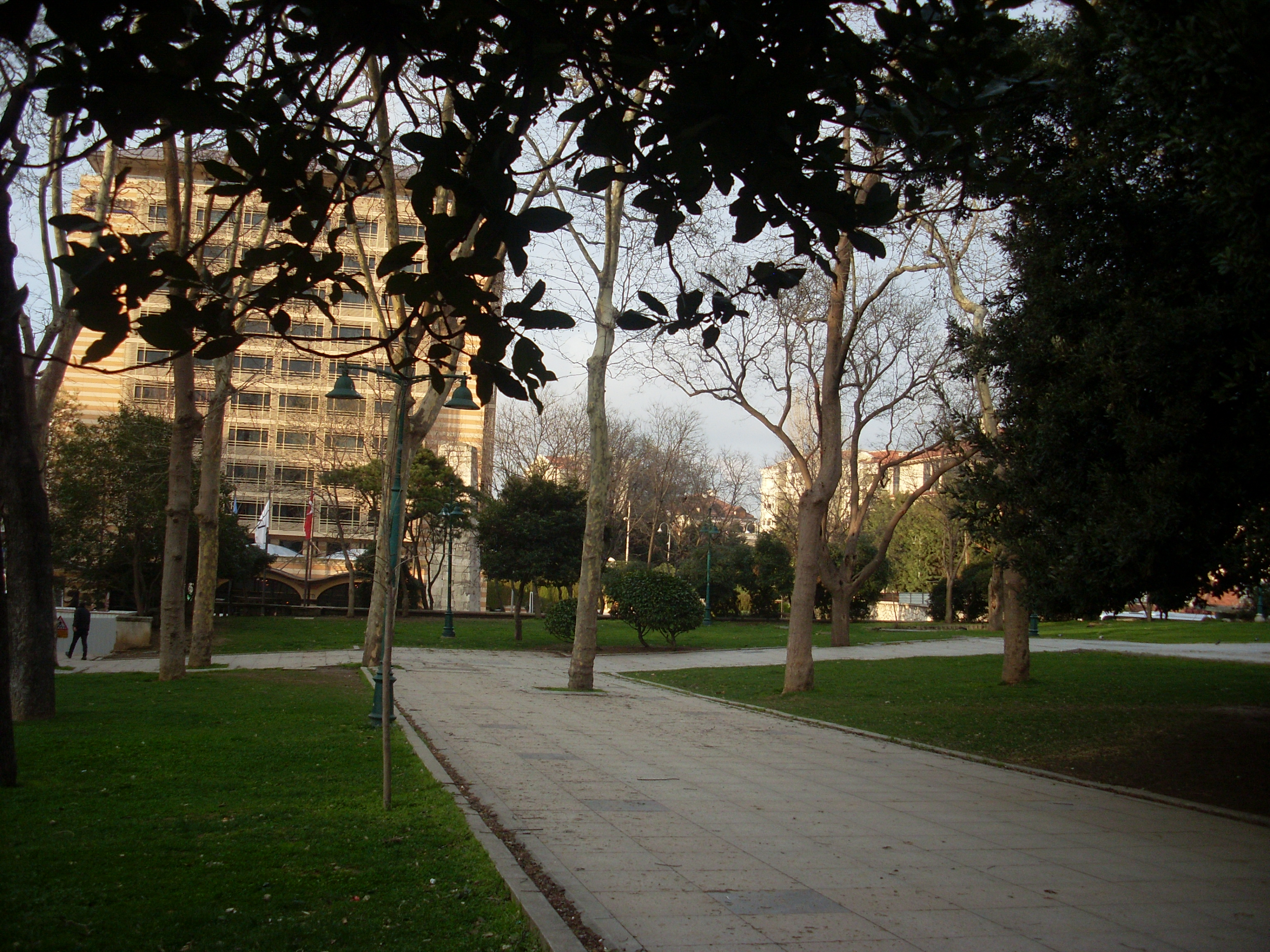
Taksim Gezi Park (March 2013)

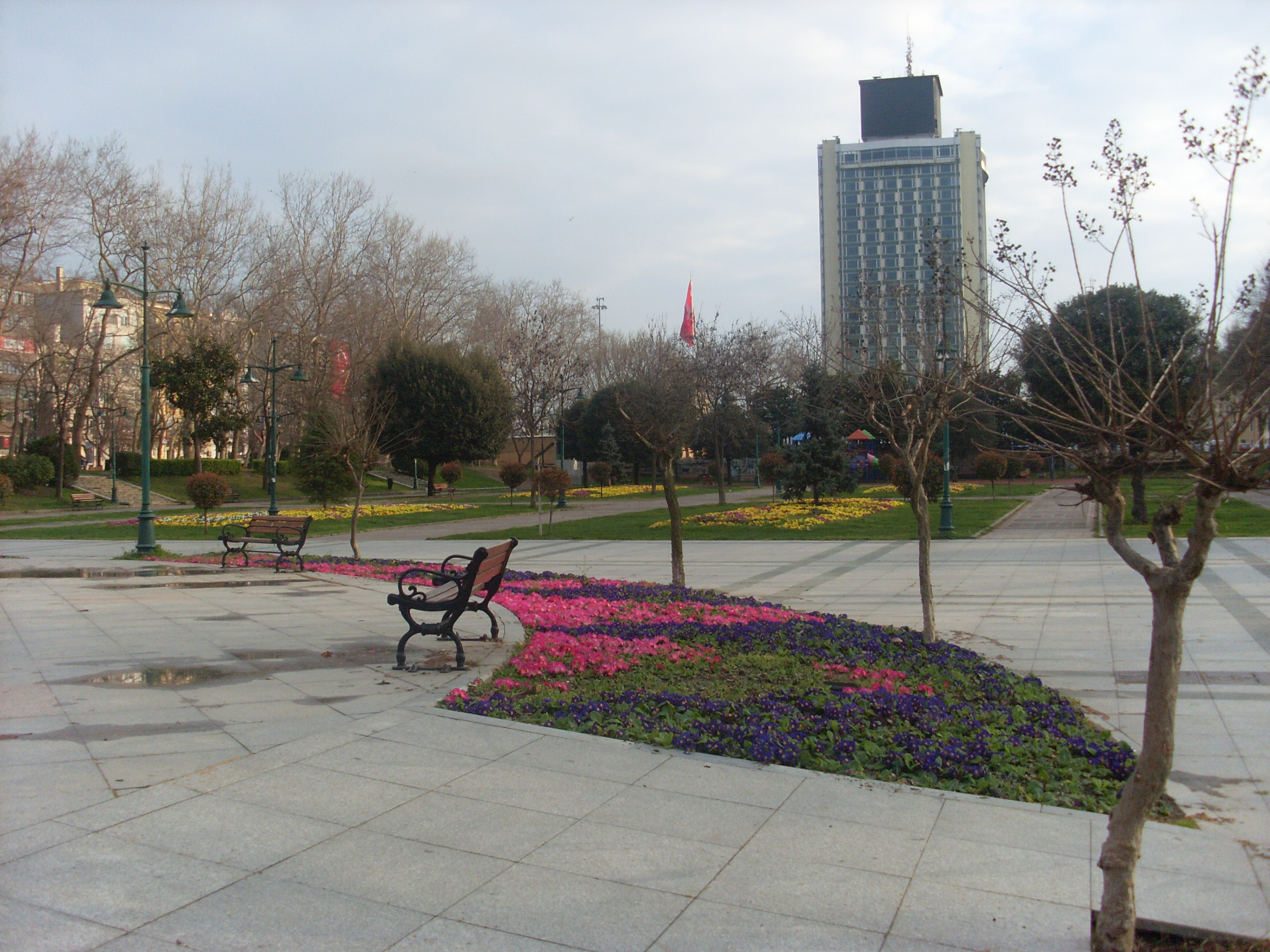
Taksim Gezi Park (March 2013)

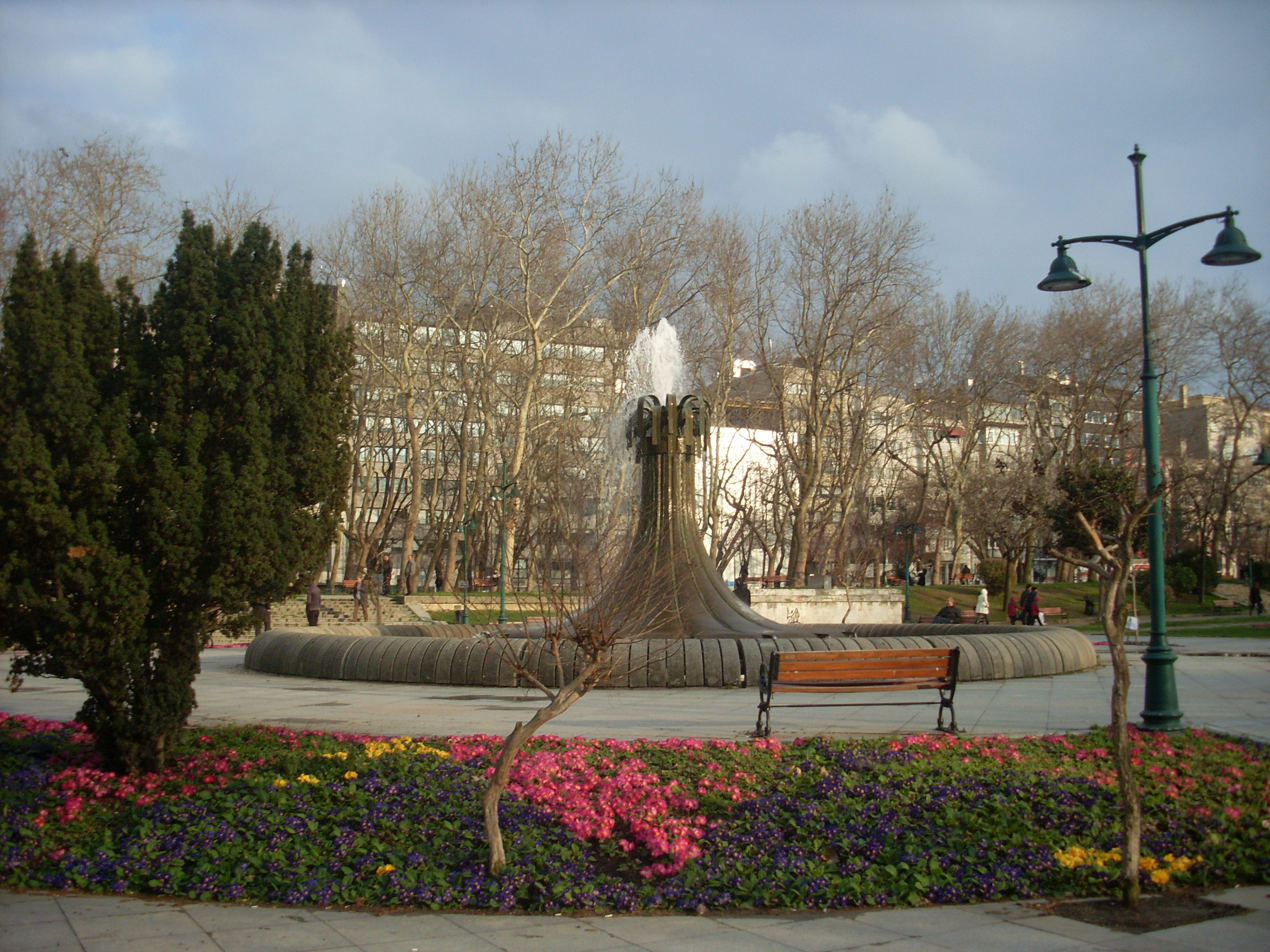
Taksim Gezi Park (March 2013)

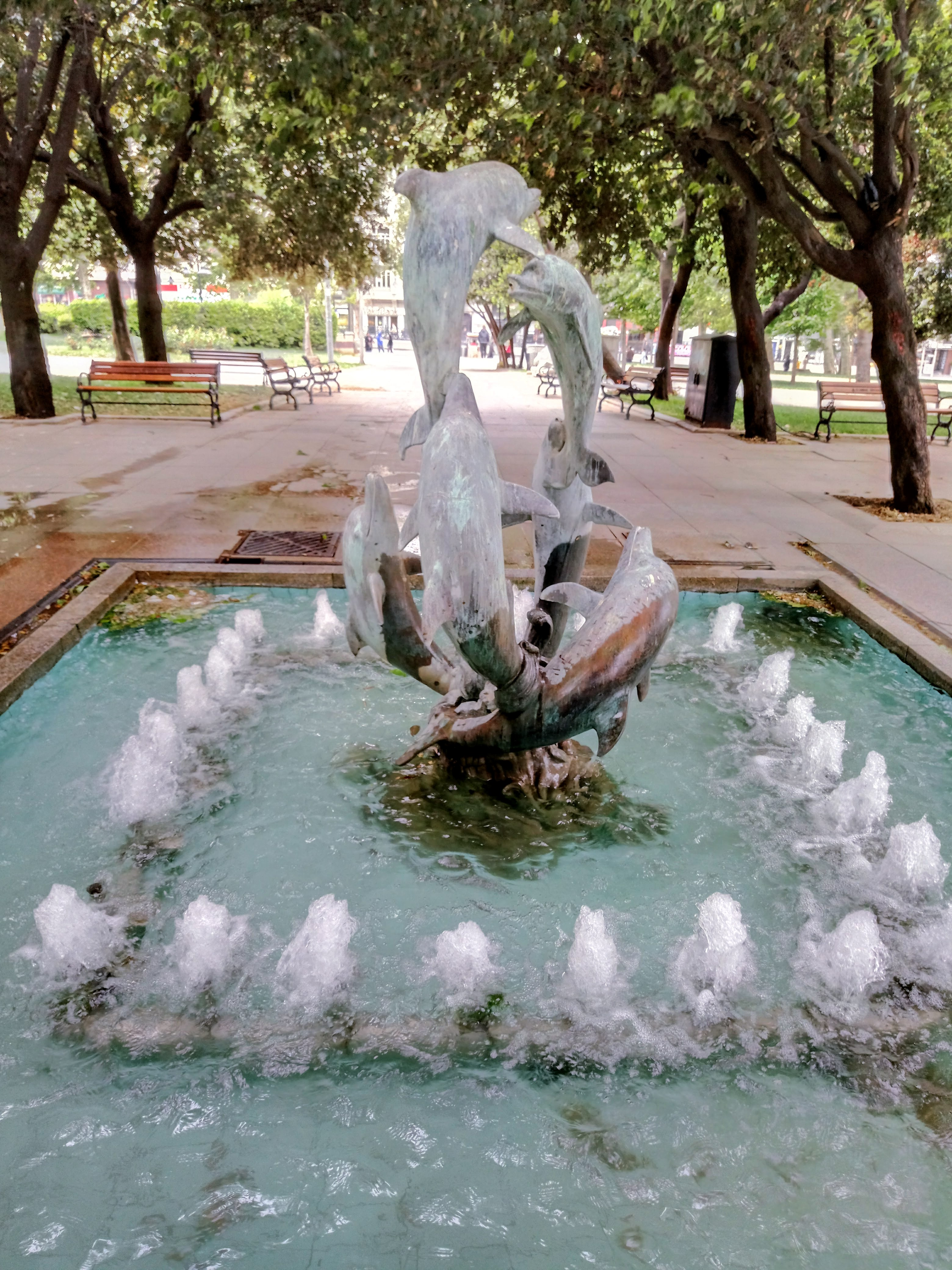
Taksim Gezi Park water fountains

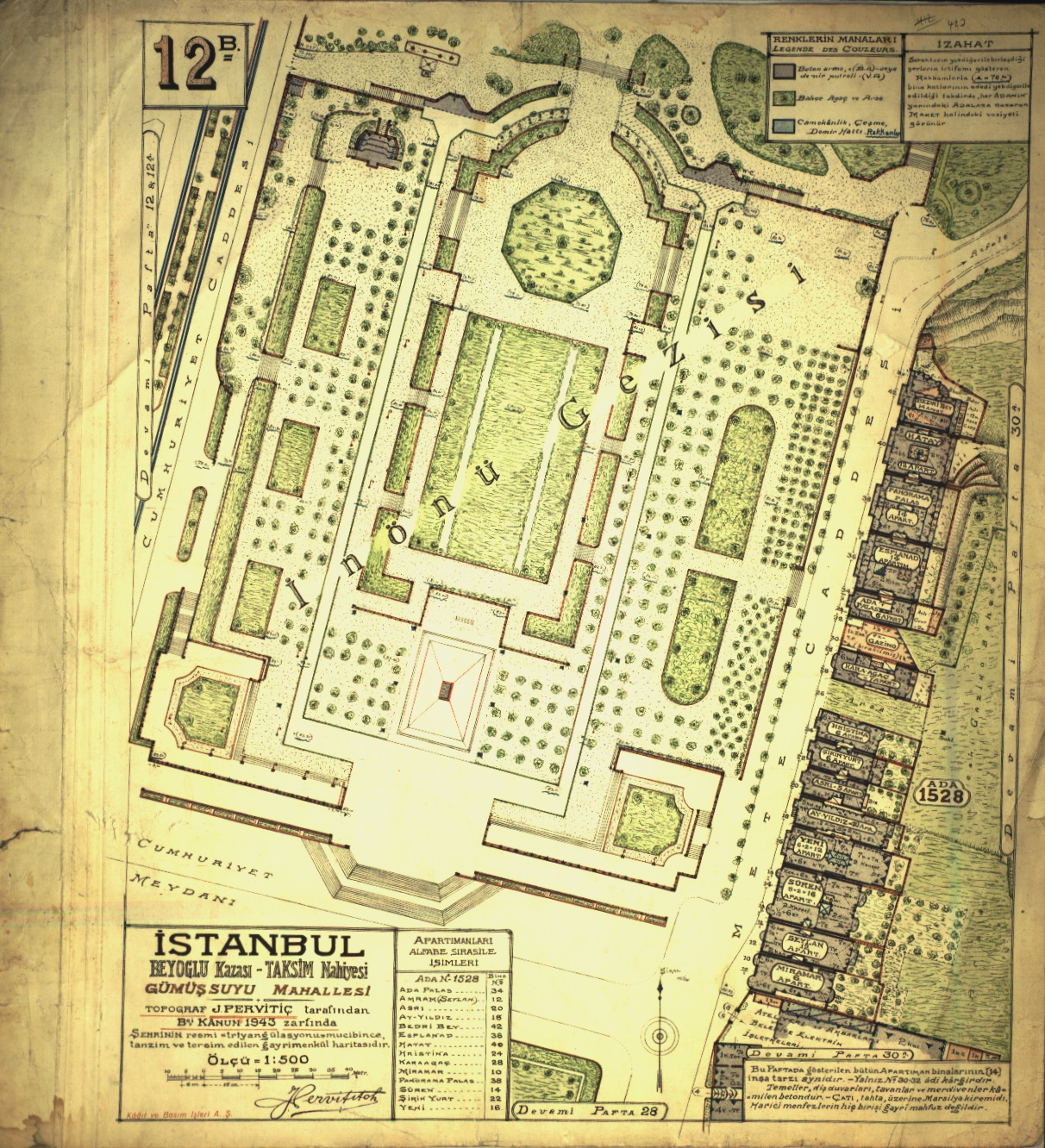
Taksim Gezi Park Map, 1943

== See also ==
- Taksim Square
- İstiklal Avenue
