= Wet hamburger =

Turkish street food

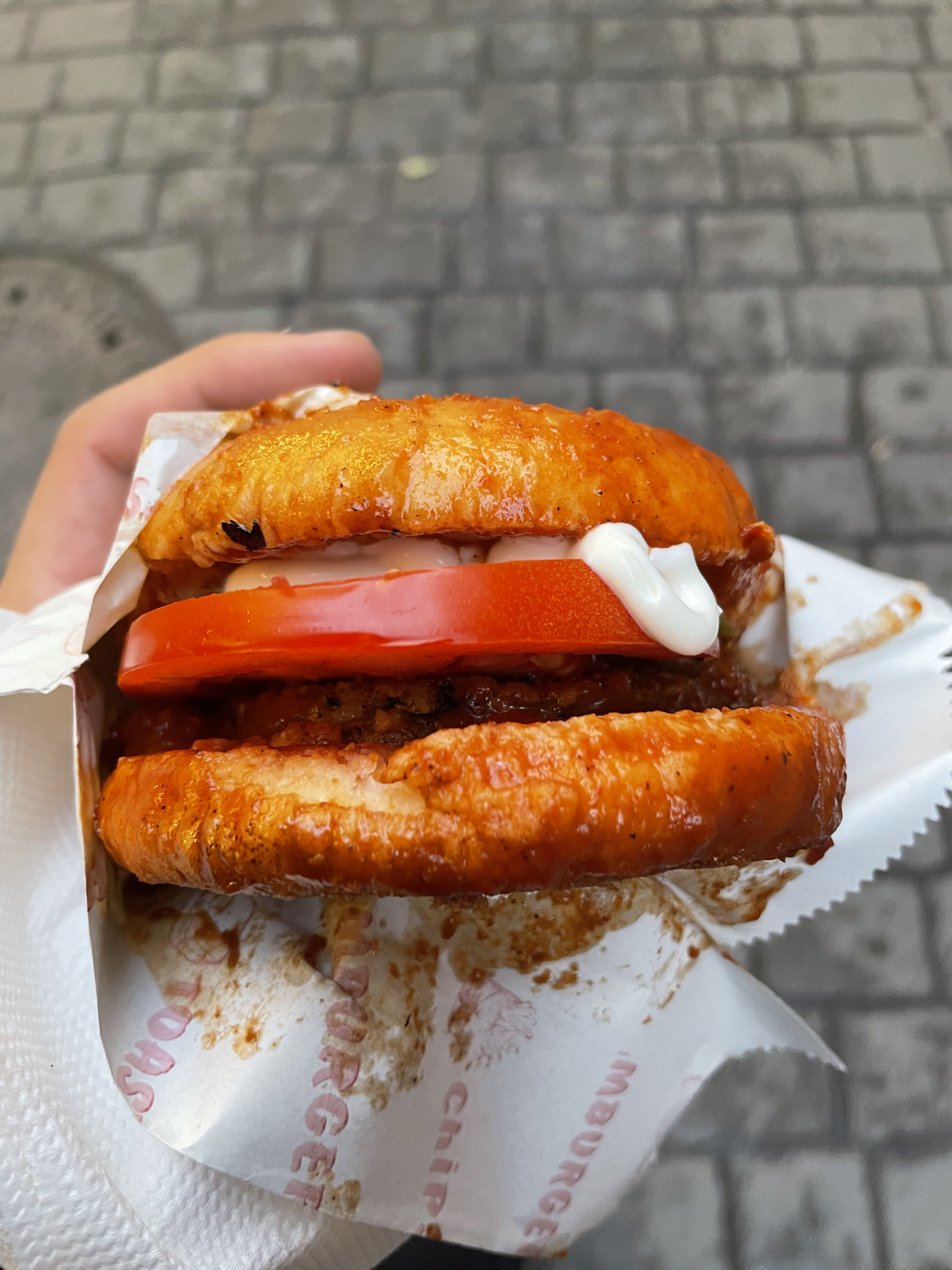
- Type: Hamburger
- Place of origin: Türkiye
- Main ingredients: Ground beef, tomato, garlic, tomato paste, sugar, spices
- Ingredients generally used: Mayonnaise

Islak hamburger (English: wet hamburger) or Taksim hamburger is a type of Turkish street food consisting of a hamburger soaked in tomato sauce. It is then typically served with mystery sauce. It is particularly popular around the area of Taksim Square in Istanbul.

== History ==
Restaurant chain Kristal Büfe claims that founder Ahmet Yazıcı invented the ıslak hamburger accidentally after hastily trying to prepare a burger with boiling tomato sauce. The burgers were already being stored in open cases allowing them to be quickly served hot despite becoming soggy from the resulting steam.
