= Chapulin =

Chapulin or Chapulín may refer to:

- El Chapulín Colorado, Mexican television series
- Chapulines, Mexican food
- Luis "Chapulín" Díaz, Mexican racing driver
- Chapulling, Turkish neologism

== See also ==
- Chapulineros de Oaxaca, Mexican football team
