= Chapulling =

Turkish neologism

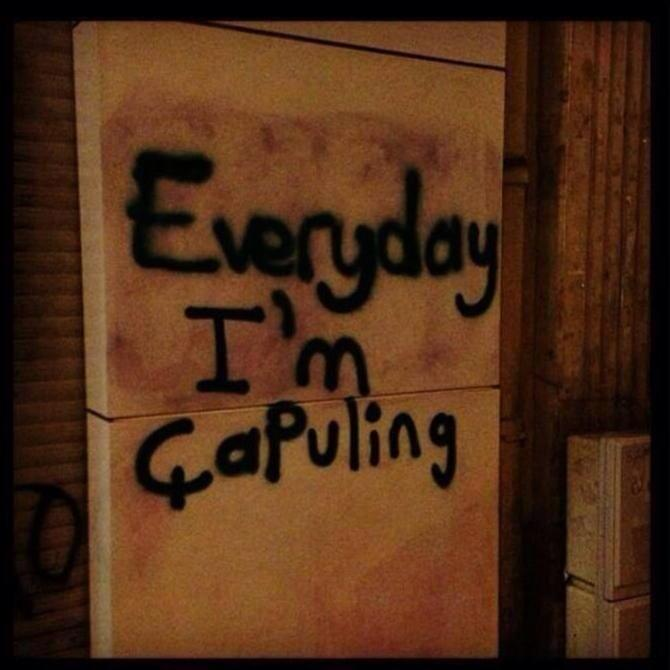
Graffiti from Turkey, June 2013 that reads "Everyday I'm Çapuling", referencing LMFAO's "Party Rock Anthem"

Chapulling (Turkish: Çapulcu, Turkish pronunciation: [t͡ʃapuɫd͡ʒu]) is a neologism originating in the Gezi Park protests, coined from Prime Minister Erdoğan's use of the term çapulcu (roughly translated to "marauders") to describe the protesters. Çapulcu was rapidly reappropriated by the protesters, both in its original form and as the anglicized chapuller and additionally verbified chapulling, given the meaning of "fighting for your rights". Chapulling has been used in Turkish both in its anglicized form and in the hybrid word form çapuling.

The word quickly caught on, adopted by the demonstrators and online activists, and became a viral video. Many took the concept further by integrating the unique nature of the demonstrations and defined it as "to act towards taking the democracy of a nation to the next step by reminding governments of their reason for existence in a peaceful and humorous manner." Variations of chapulling were also coined for other languages.

== Background ==
The Prime Minister Recep Tayyip Erdoğan said during a speech on 2 June 2013, referring to the protesters:

We cannot just watch some çapulcu inciting our people. [...] Yes, we will also build a mosque. I do not need permission for this; neither from the head of the Republican People's Party (CHP) nor from a few çapulcu. I got permission from the fifty percent of the citizens who elected us as the governing party.

The graffiti is adapted to many artworks on t-shirts, posters, etc. and these artworks contributed to the reappropriation of the term çapulcu.

Pronounced "cha-pul-ju" in Turkish, the traditional meaning of çapulcu has been rendered in English in a variety of ways, including "marauders", "bums", "looters", "vandals", and "riffraff".

== Reappropriation ==
The protesters quickly decided to reappropriate the term, and began to describe themselves as çapulcu. Within days, the usually negative term was being used as a positive term of self-identification. International supporters of the Gezi Park events posted social media photos of themselves holding messages of "I'm a chapuller as well" in their own languages. The movement was supported by the linguist and political critic Noam Chomsky, who defined himself as a chapuller, recording the message that "everywhere is Taksim, everywhere is resistance". Cem Boyner, Chairman of Boyner Holding, also supported the movement by holding a banner saying "I'm neither rightist nor leftist, I am a chapuller." The word became widely used on social networking sites, with Facebook users update their statuses to say that they were "capulling", and T-shirts and banners were produced with chapulling slogans, and a Ustream-based live stream from Gezi Park was launched under the name Çapul TV.

It was reported that the Turkish Language Association (the language regulator for the Turkish language) had changed the description of "çapulcu" in their online dictionary to mean "rebel" instead of its traditional meaning, "looter", in response to the events, but the Association said this was not the case. One online Turkish-English dictionary, Zargan, adopted the new word chapulling in what Agence France Presse described as "a gesture of solidarity with the demonstrators". It was also added to the Tureng dictionary and Urban Dictionary.

By 8 June the Turkish Patent Institute had received 16 applications for çapulcu-related trademarks, covering items such as toilet paper, drinks, and a newspaper.

Following the protests in Turkey the Istanbul-based platform InEnArt presents Urban Voices which opens a critical view on cultural practices and phenomena that expresses the ethos, aspirations, and dreams of a specific population during a well-defined era and that triggered dramatic cultural changes. One section of Urban Voices focusses on the protest culture in Turkey as described with the neologism Çapuling. It describes and reflects the visual culture, humor and irony of the peaceful protesters (the Çapulcu) as it developed in many forms in Turkey during 2013.

For the exhibition Made in Turkiye presented by NoLaB in 2017 at Hasköy Spinning Factory, the participating artists continue to show a reflection on traditional Turkish culture by recreating old handcraft in an innovative, ironical and artistic way.
