= Taksim Military Barracks =

Taksim Military Barracks Halil Pasha Artillery Barracks
- Taksim Kışlası; Halil Paşa Topçu Kışlası
- Taksim Square, Istanbul, Turkey
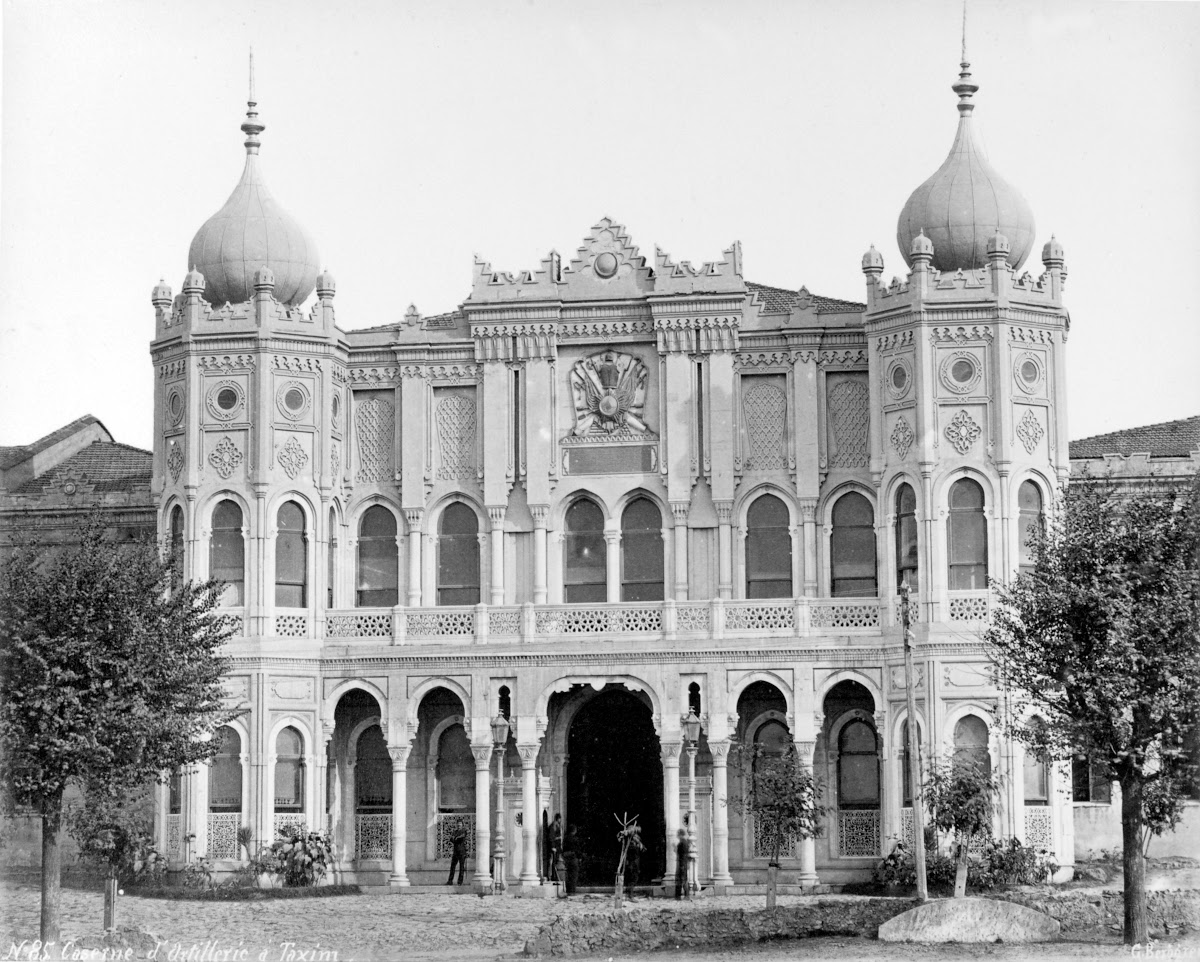
- Taksim Military Barracks

Location
- Coordinates: 41.038°N 28.987°E

Site history
- Built: 1806; 220 years ago
- Built by: Sultan Selim III
- In use: until 1909
- Demolished: 1940; 86 years ago
- Events: 31 March Incident

The Taksim Military Barracks or Halil Pasha Artillery Barracks (Turkish: Taksim Kışlası or Halil Paşa Topçu Kışlası) were located at the site of the present-day Taksim Gezi Park next to Taksim Square in Istanbul, Turkey. It was built in 1806.

During the 31 March Incident in 1909, the Barracks building suffered considerable damage, and waited to be repaired. Its internal courtyard was later transformed into the Taksim Stadium in 1921, and became the first football stadium in Turkey, used by all major football clubs in the city, including Beşiktaş J.K., Galatasaray and Fenerbahçe S.K. The stadium was closed in 1939, and demolished in 1940, during the construction and renovation works of Taksim Square and Taksim Gezi Park in accordance with the plans of French architect and city planner Henri Prost.

== Reconstruction ==
On 16 September 2011, the assembly of the Istanbul Metropolitan Municipality decided to rebuild the structure; despite the area falling within the purview of green space protection ordinances. Development interests were regarded by many of exploiting statutes protecting historic structures in order to trump green space protection. The proposed rebuilt barracks were intended to be a shopping center incorporating cultural centres, an opera house and a mosque and containing no surviving portion of the barracks that existed on the site.

The reconstruction of the barracks was met by protests in Istanbul; after police brutality against initial protestors, this evolved into the nationwide 2013–14 protests in Turkey, also known as the Gezi Park protests.
