= Tureng dictionary =

Online Turkish-English dictionary

Tureng Dictionary
- Website type: Bilingual Turkish English Dictionary
- Available in: English Turkish Spanish German French
- Owner: Özgür Süyel
- Website: www.tureng.com
- Registration: No registration needed
- Launched: 2006
- Current status: active

Tureng dictionary (name coined from the first syllables of the words Turkish and English) is a bilingual online Turkish English dictionary provided by Tureng Çeviri Ltd, a Turkish translation company. As of May 20, 2009, the site has more than 2.000.000 English and Turkish words and phrases, classified into categories by the field of usage with audial pronunciation in three different accents, British, American and Australian.

== History ==
The dictionary was developed by Özgür Süyel, a Turkish English translator with more than 10 years experience in translation.

Since September 2006, the site has been developed primarily for those who are working in translation and language services sector, academicians, college students and foreign trade professionals.

== Content ==
The definitions on Tureng Dictionary are based on the “unfound” words, phrases and idioms translated by Tureng translation team and Tureng forum users.

The user can view all related results of the searched term along with the other combinations of that word in usage categories like technical, law, medical etc. A high percentage of dictionary's database is unique phrases and idioms not found on other Turkish English dictionaries.

Most words have multiple definitions and the site enables the users to search and check the meanings in Google images, Merriam Webster, dictionary.reference.com, TDK (Turkish Language Institution), and thefreedictionary.com, as well. Also the users may contribute by adding or correcting words. IE8 Accelerator, Google ToolBar, iGoogle, Firefox ToolBar, mobile dictionary, PDA and Pocket PC versions are the other helpful features.

Tureng Dictionary introduced the example sentence feature for almost all words and definitions in early 2024, and the AI-based sentence translation feature in many languages in fall 2025.
