= Taksim Square =

District in Beyoğlu, Istanbul, Turkey

- Public square
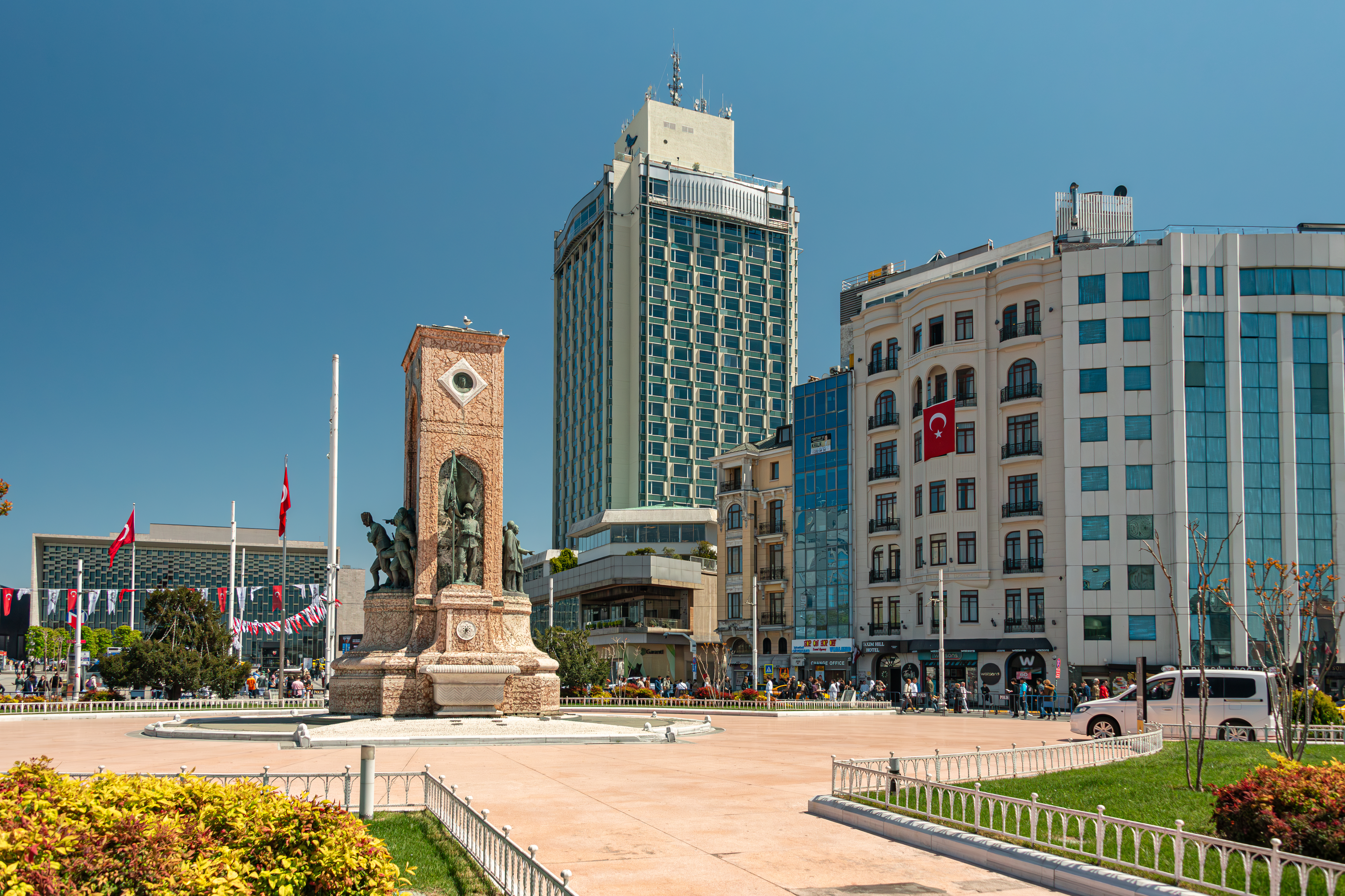
- Features: Republic Monument, Atatürk Cultural Center, Marmara Hotel, Taksim Square Mosque
- Location: Beyoğlu, Istanbul
- Interactive map of Taksim Square
- Coordinates: 41°02′13″N 28°59′09″E

Taksim Square (Turkish: Taksim Meydanı, IPA: [ˈtaksim ˈmejdanɯ]), situated in Beyoğlu in the European part of Istanbul, Turkey, is a major tourist and leisure district famed for its restaurants, shops, and hotels. It is considered the heart of modern Istanbul, with the central station of the Istanbul Metro network. Taksim Square is also the location of the Republic Monument (Turkish: Cumhuriyet Anıtı) which was crafted by Pietro Canonica and inaugurated in 1928. The monument commemorates the 5th anniversary of the foundation of the Republic of Turkey in 1923, following the Turkish War of Independence.

The square is flanked to the south by The Marmara Hotel, to the east by the Atatürk Cultural Centre, to the north by Gezi Park and to the west by Taksim Mosque. Several major roads converge on the square: Gümüşsuyu Caddesi, Cumhuriyet Caddesi, Tarlabaşı Bulvarı, İstiklal Caddesi and Sıraselviler Caddesi.

== History ==
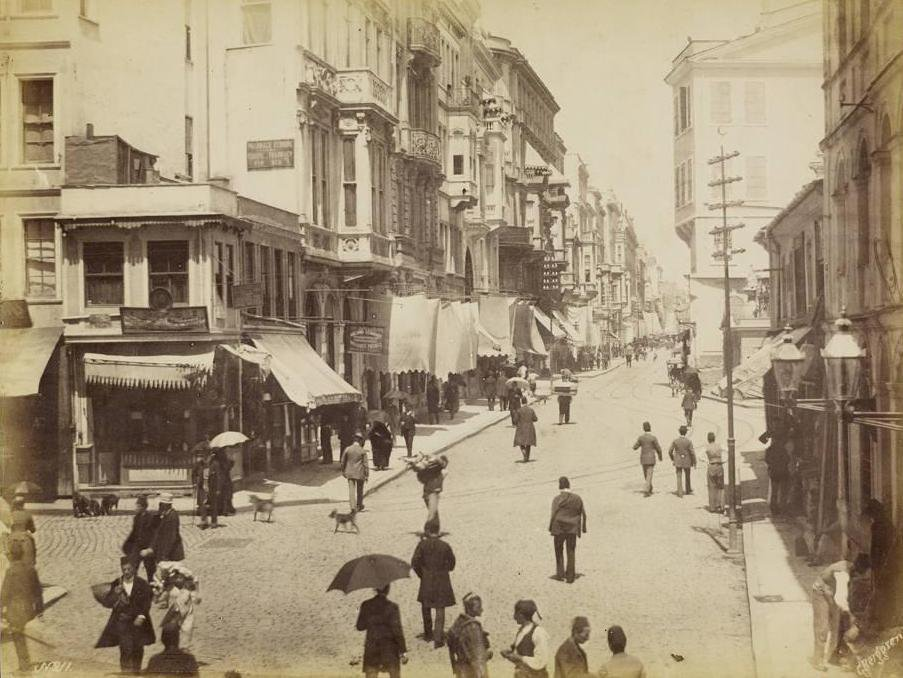
Taksim in the 1880s

The word Taksim means "division" or "distribution" in Arabic. Taksim Square was originally the point where the main water lines from the north of Istanbul were collected and branched off to other parts of the city. This use for the area was established by Sultan Mahmud I. The square takes its name from the Ottoman era stone reservoir which is located along one side of the square.

Another significant building that once stood on the square was the 19th century Taksim Artillery Barracks (Taksim Kışlası, which later became the Taksim Stadium), but which was demolished in 1940 during the construction works in accordance with the plans of French architect and city planner Henri Prost for Taksim Square and Taksim Gezi Park.

Taksim Gezi Park is a small green park in the midst of the concrete expanse of central Istanbul. In 2013, the city municipality, wanting to rebuild the old barracks as a shopping venue on the site of the park, began forcefully removing protesters who had set up camp in the park. After news spread of the police brutality, thousands of people rallied in the Occupy Taksim movement, to stop the demolition of the park. As of 2013, the status of the demolition project was in limbo, the Justice and Development Party (AKP) government has the Police stationed in and around Taksim Square ready with riot control equipment to deter any large demonstrations.

== Present day ==
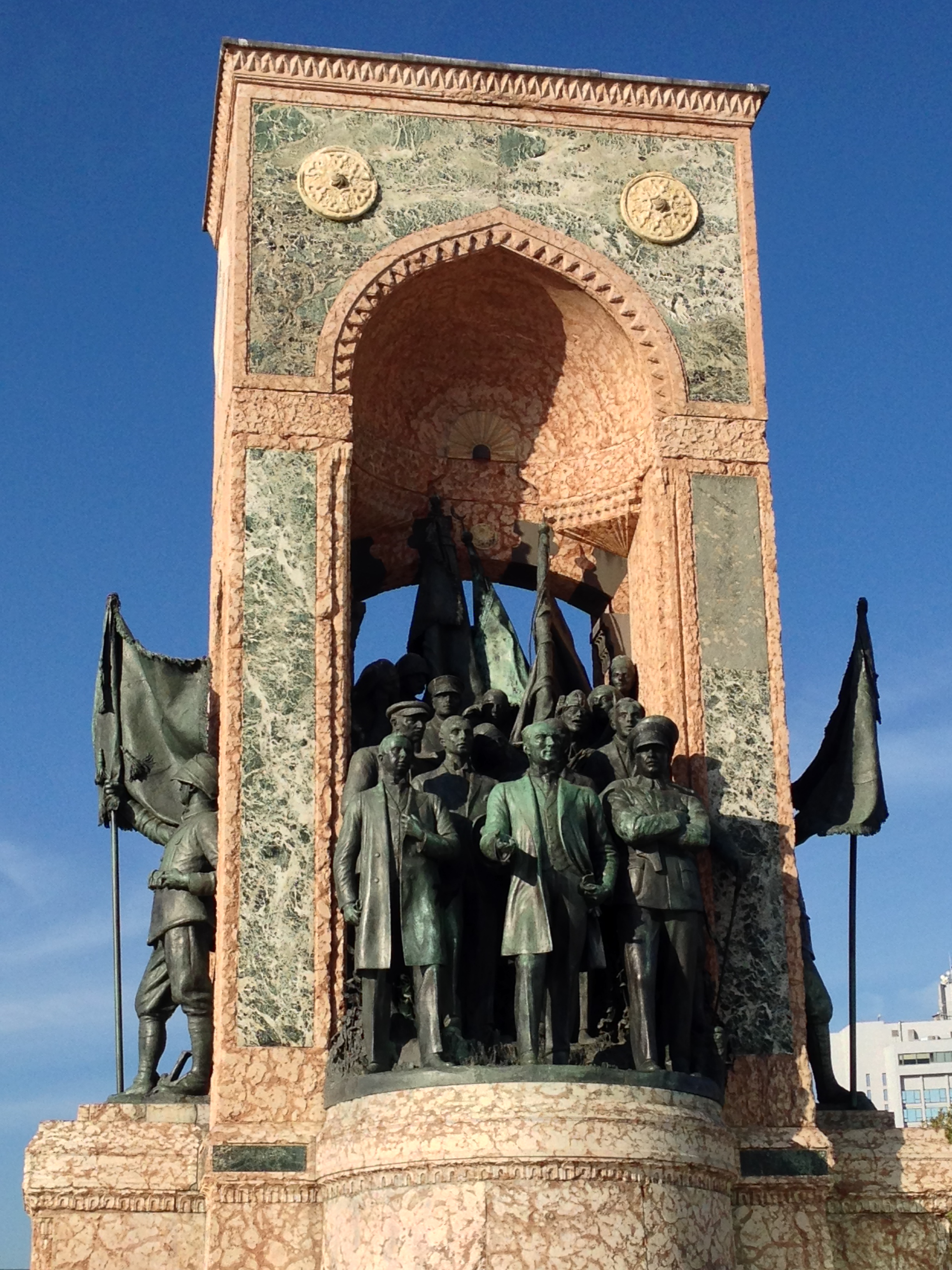
The Republic Monument (1928) at Taksim Square, crafted by Italian sculptor Pietro Canonica.

Taksim is a main transportation hub and a popular destination for both tourists and residents of Istanbul. İstiklal Caddesi (Independence Avenue), a long pedestrian shopping street, ends at this square, and a nostalgic tram runs from the square along the avenue, ending near the Tünel (1875) which is the world's second-oldest subway line after London's Underground (1863). In addition to serving as the main transfer point for the municipal bus system, Taksim Square is also the terminus of the Hacıosman-4. Levent-Taksim-Yenikapı subway line of the Istanbul Metro.

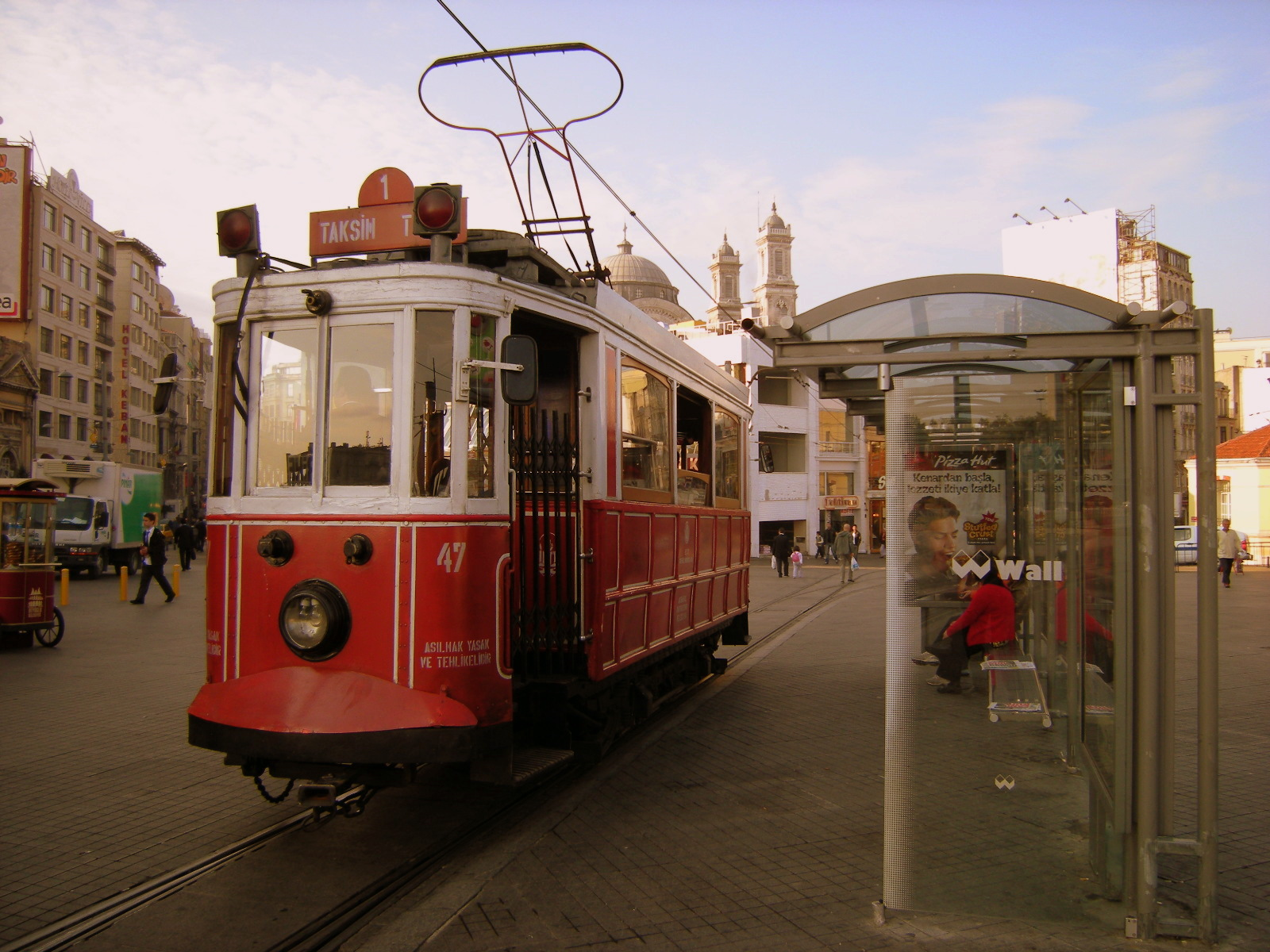
The nostalgic tram that operates between Taksim Square at north and Tünel Square at the southern end of Istiklal Avenue. The Hagia Triada Church is visible in the background.

Taksim's position was given an extra boost on June 29, 2006, when the new Kabataş-Taksim Funicular line F1 connecting the Taksim Metro station with the Kabataş tramway station and Seabus port was opened, allowing people to ascend to Taksim in just 110 seconds.

Surrounding Taksim Square are numerous travel agencies, hotels, restaurants, pubs, and international fast food chains such as Pizza Hut, McDonald's, Subway, and Burger King. It is also home to some of Istanbul's grandest hotels including the InterContinental, the Divan, and The Marmara Hotel. Taksim used to be a favourite location for public events such as parades, New Year celebrations, and other social gatherings, although since 2016 permission has rarely been given for such gatherings.

Atatürk Cultural Center (Atatürk Kültür Merkezi), a multi-purpose concert hall and cultural centre reopened after renovation in 2021, is also located in Taksim Square. It faces the Taksim Square Mosque which also opened 2021.

== Demonstrations and incidents ==
The square used to be an important venue for political protests. Following the Gezi Park protests in 2013, demonstrations have been banned at the plaza, with city police fencing off access to the area in advance of political anniversaries and other anticipated dates of protest.

- On February 16, 1969, some 150 leftist demonstrators were injured during clashes with right wing groups in what is known as "Bloody Sunday".
- In the events known as the Taksim Square massacre, 36 left-wing demonstrators were killed by unidentified and allegedly right-wing gunmen on the square during the Labour Day demonstrations of May 1, 1977.
- On 10 August 1982, Artin Penik, a Turkish Armenian, set himself on fire to protest the Esenboga airport attack by the Armenian Secret Army for the Liberation of Armenia.
- Taksim Square was the location of football riots in 2000 when two Leeds United fans were stabbed to death during clashes with Galatasaray fans, the night before the 1999-2000 UEFA Cup semi-final first leg match between the two teams.
- On October 31, 2010, a suicide bomb went off next to a police bus. The bomber, a TAK militant, died, while 15 police officers and 17 civilians were injured.

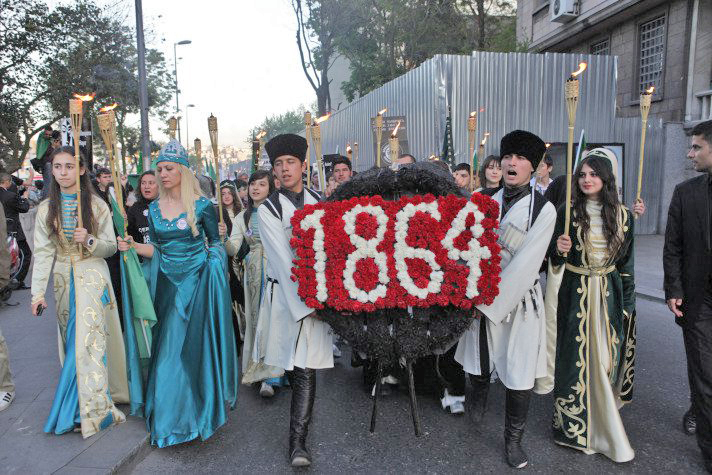
Circassians marching to commemorate the Circassian genocide at Taksim Square, 2011.

- A march to protest the Circassian genocide took place in May 2011.

=== Gezi Park protests ===
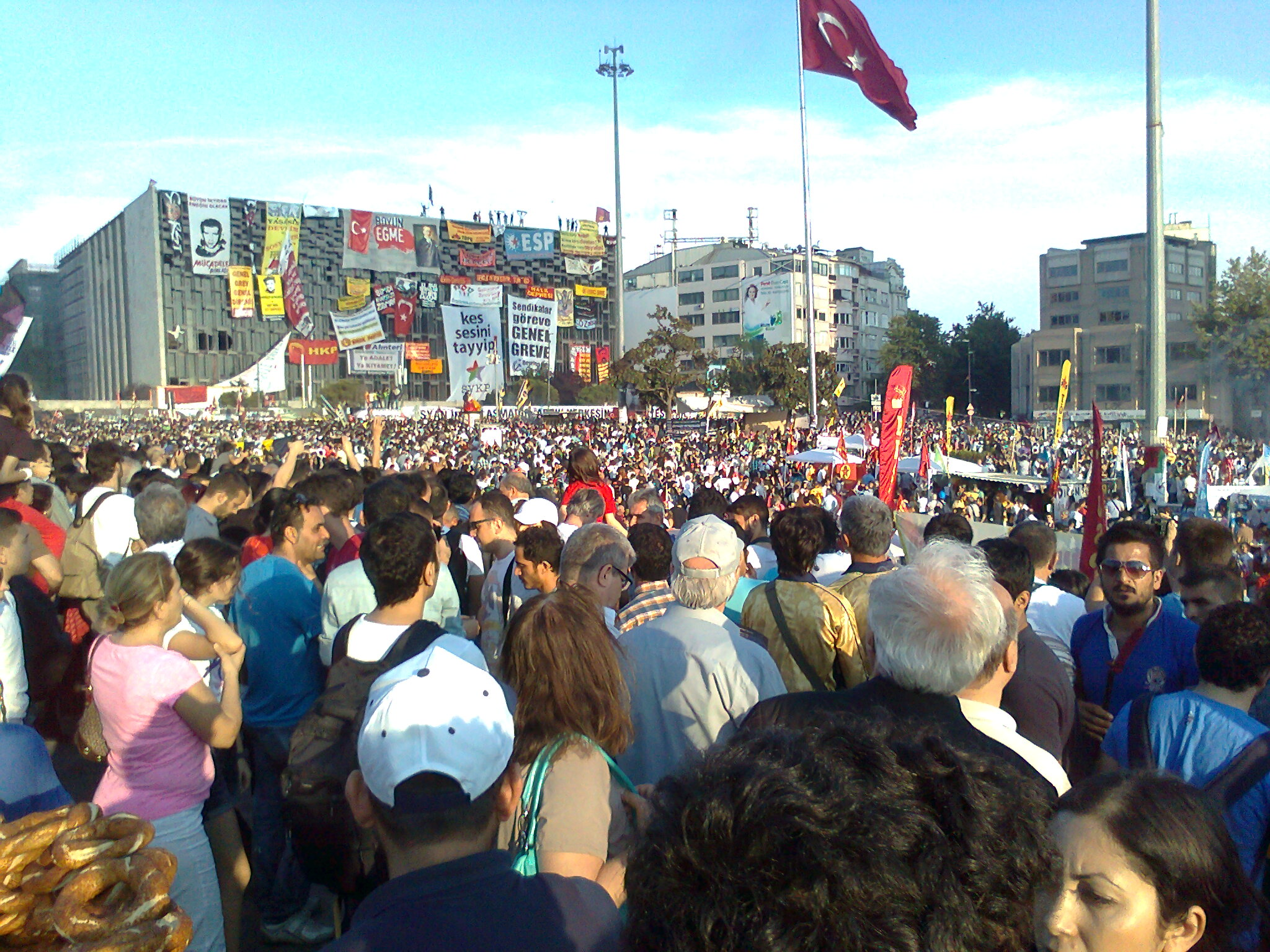
Taksim during the 2013 protests

In 2013, protests took place in Taksim in opposition to the reconstruction of the Ottoman era Taksim Military Barracks (demolished in 1940 to create Gezi Park) and a shopping centre on the site of Gezi Park. In the early morning of May 31, police forces moved in on the demonstrators and people sleeping in tents, and tried to disperse them with tear gas, pepperspray and water cannons.

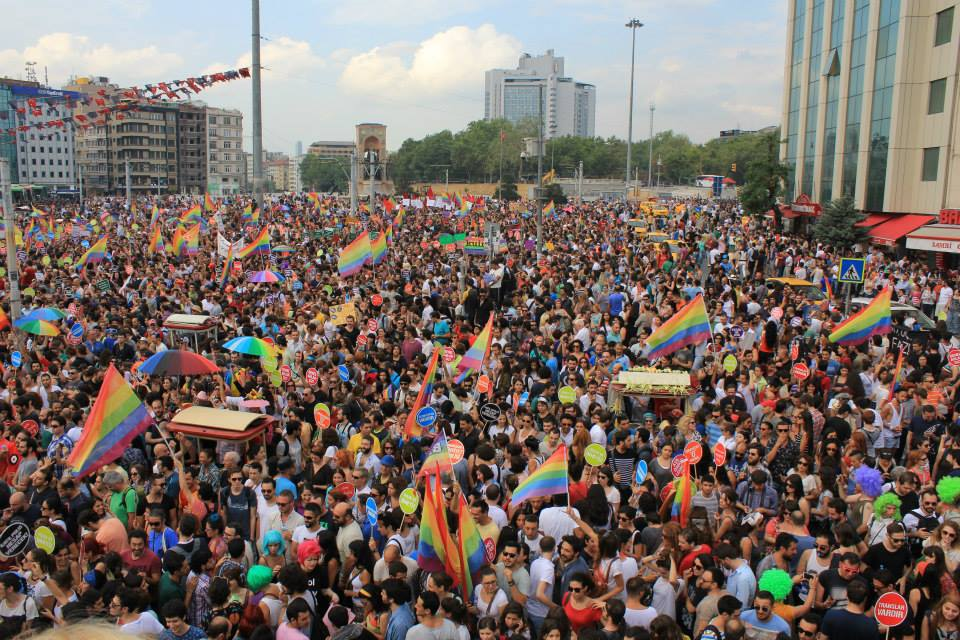
The 2013 Istanbul LGBT Pride at Taksim Square in Istanbul

The demonstrators criticized Prime Minister (now President) Recep Tayyip Erdoğan for his uncompromising stance on this controversial issue and for the Turkish police's excessive use of force against the demonstrators.

The large number of trees in the forests of northern Istanbul that were cut down to provide access to the Yavuz Sultan Selim Bridge (Third Bosphorus Bridge) and the new Istanbul International Airport (the world's largest airport) were other factors that triggered the Gezi Park protests. According to official Turkish government data, a total of 2,330,012 trees have been cut down to make way for the airport and its road connections; while a further 381,096 trees were cut down to make way for the highways leading to the Yavuz Sultan Selim Bridge.

== Gallery ==
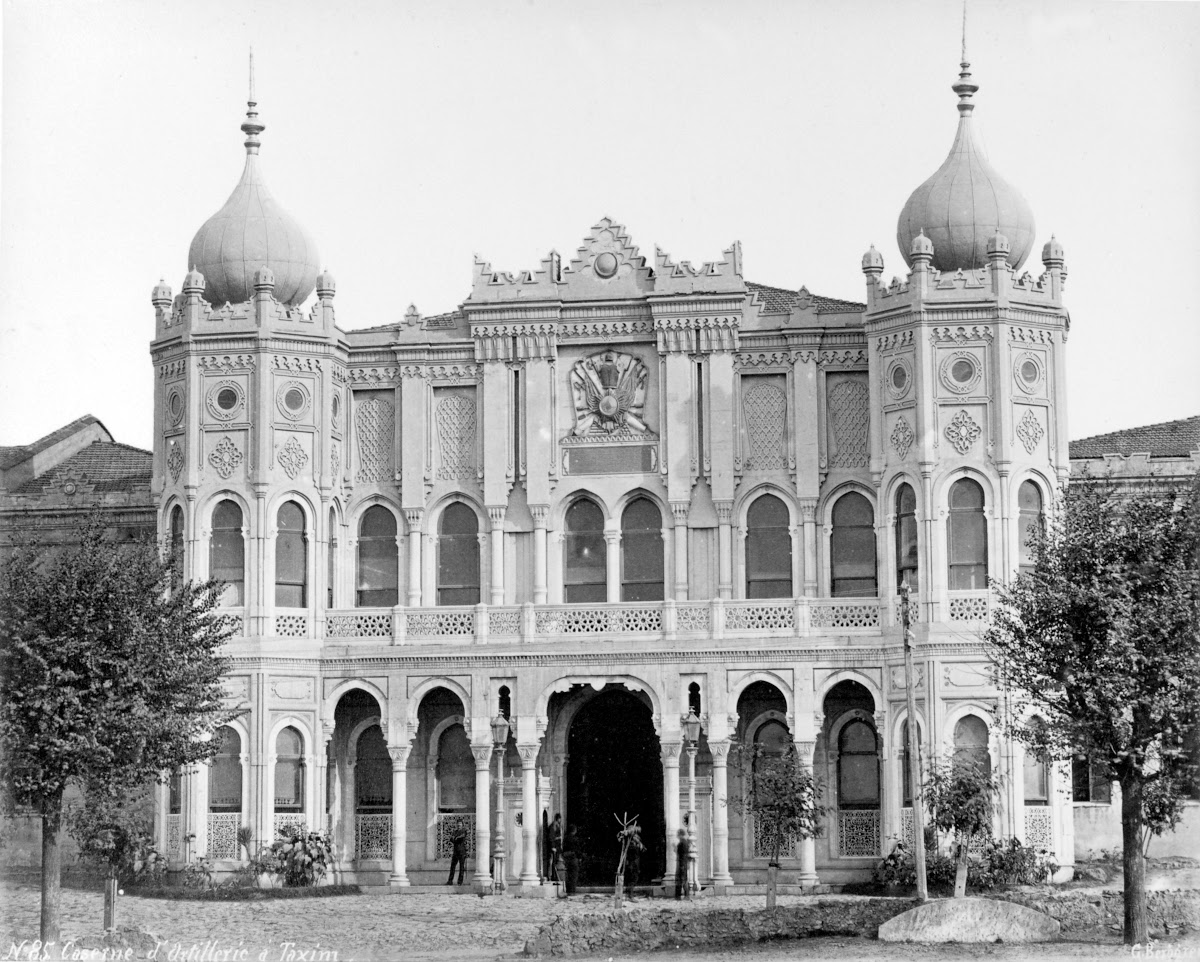
Taksim Artillery Barracks, which later became the Taksim Stadium, was demolished in 1940 and replaced by the Taksim Gezi Park in 1943.

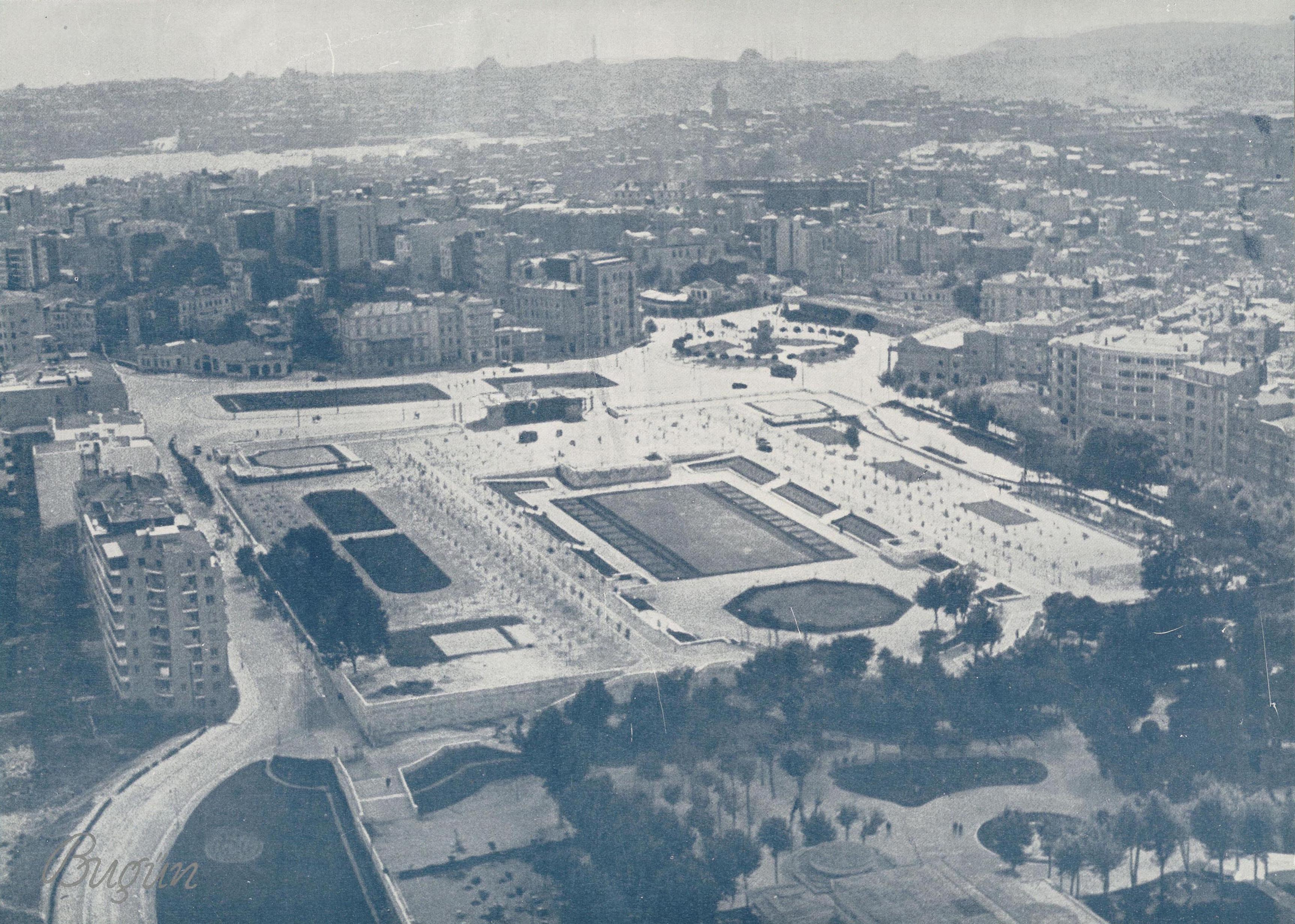
Areal view of Taksim Square after the demolition of the Taksim Artillery Barracks

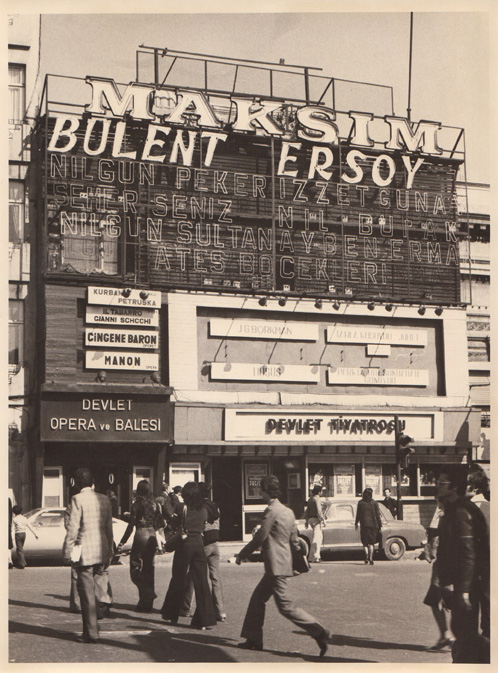
Maxim Night Club, previously Cinemajik movie theater.

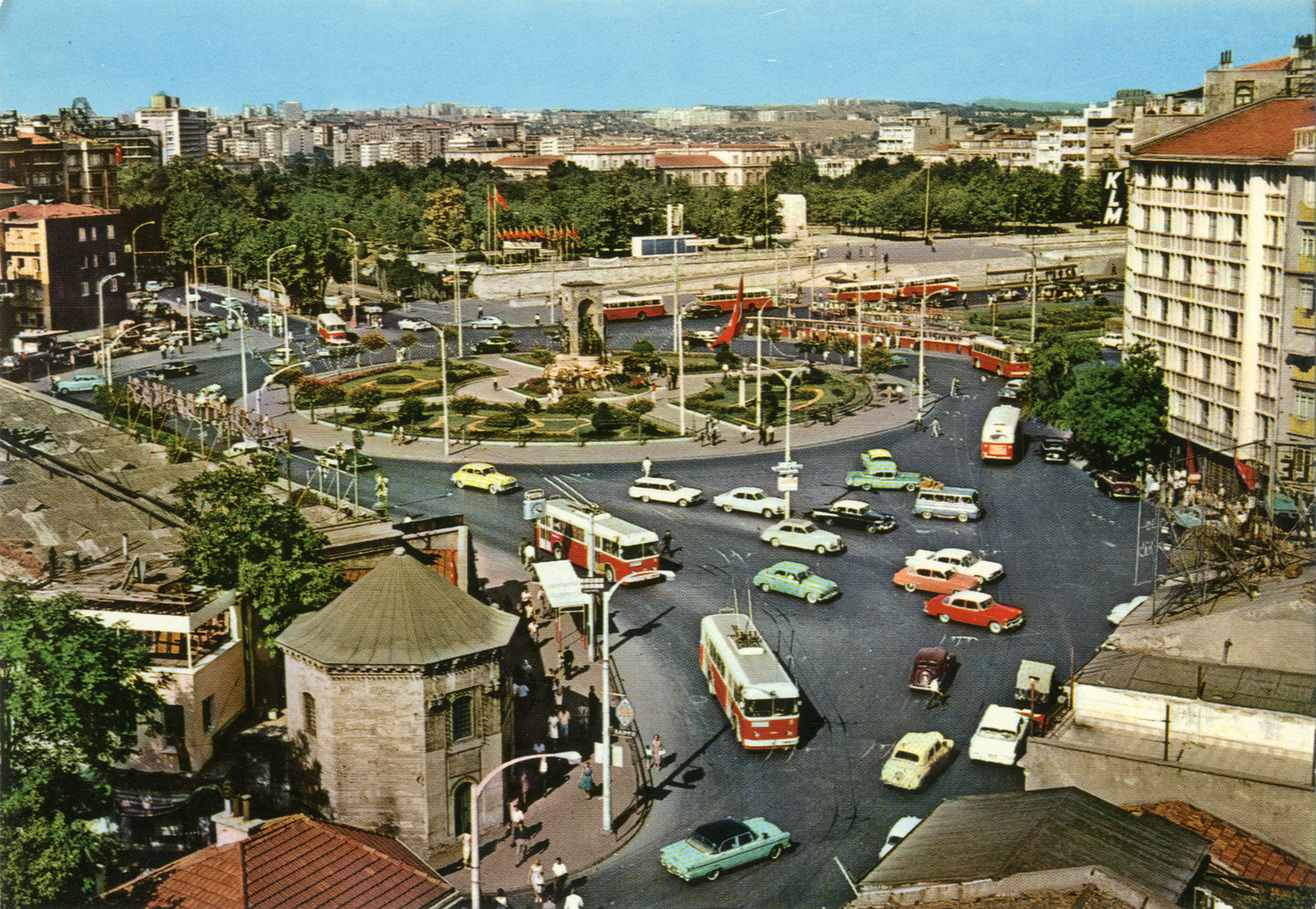
Taksim in the 1960s, with the Taşkışla Campus of Istanbul Technical University seen in the background.

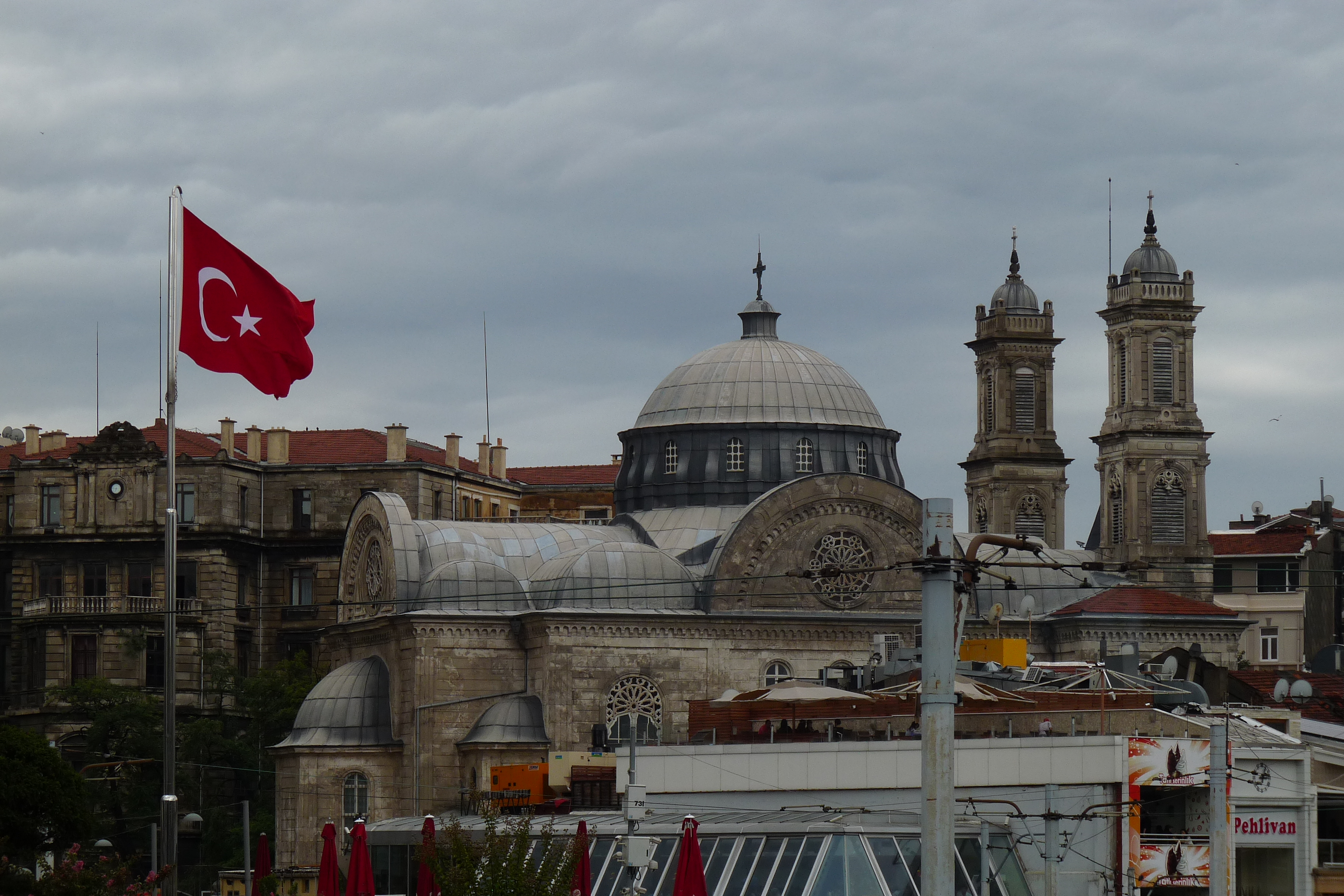
Hagia Triada Greek Orthodox Church, near Taksim Square

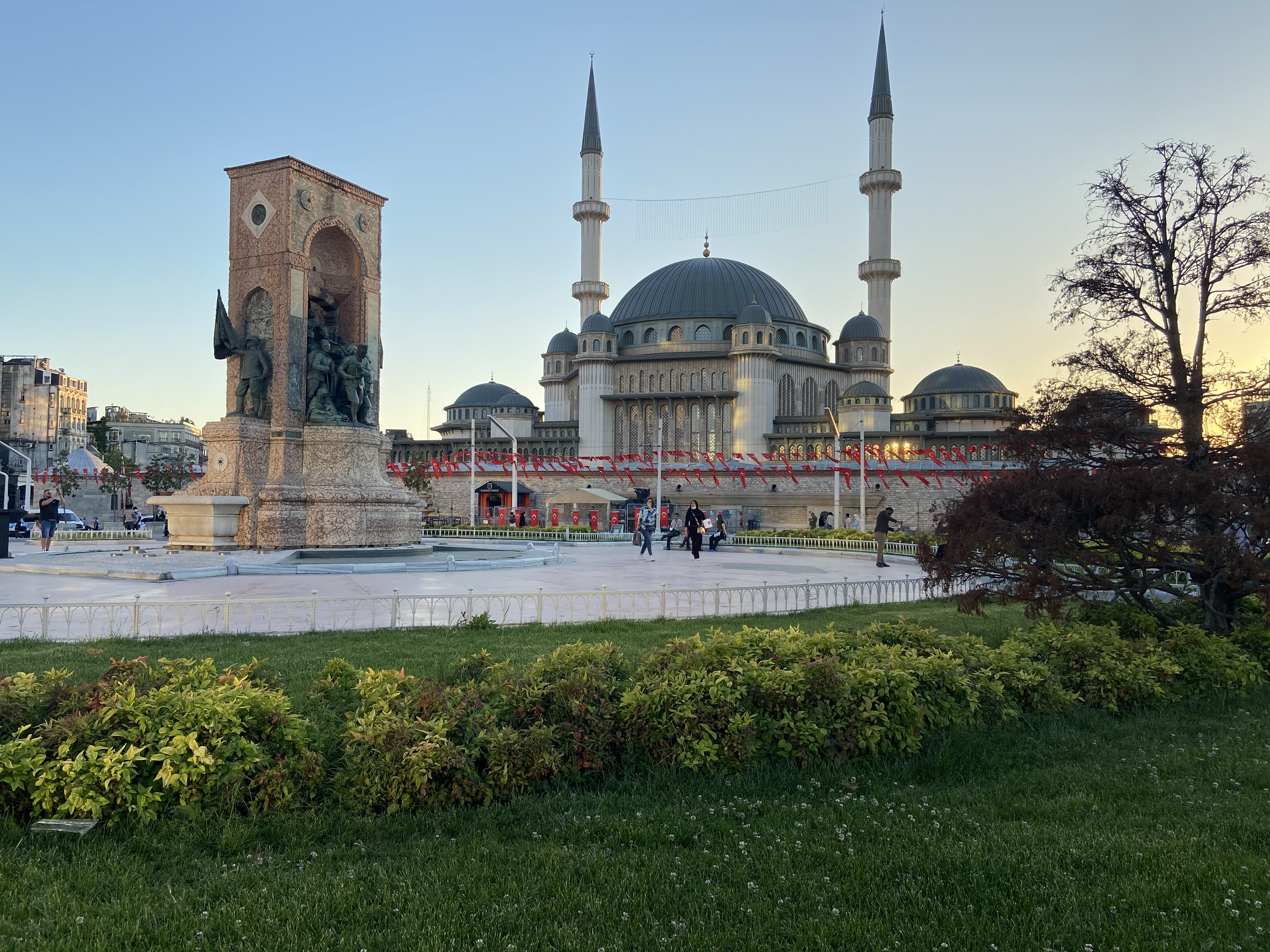
Taksim Mosque was completed in May 2021

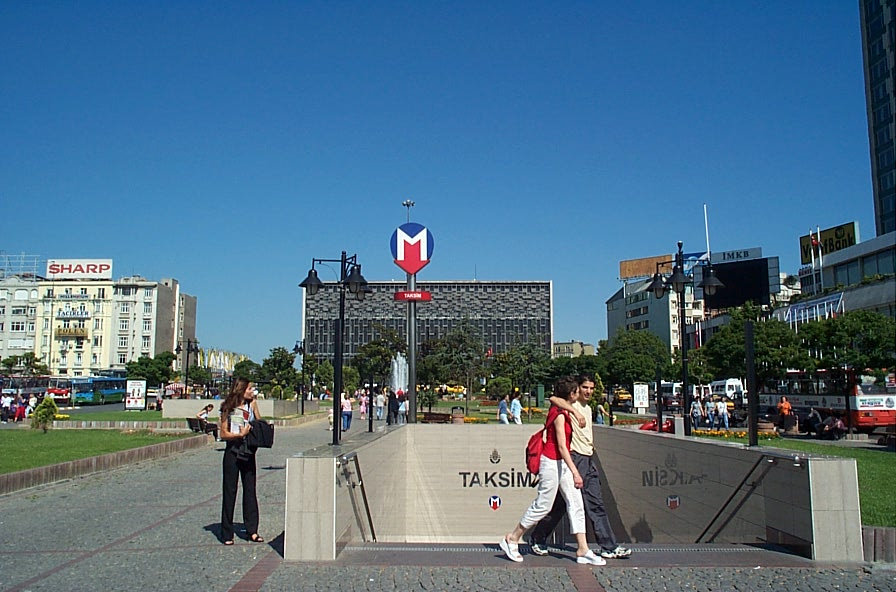
Atatürk Cultural Center at Taksim Square in 1999, with the entrance of the Taksim station of the Istanbul Metro.

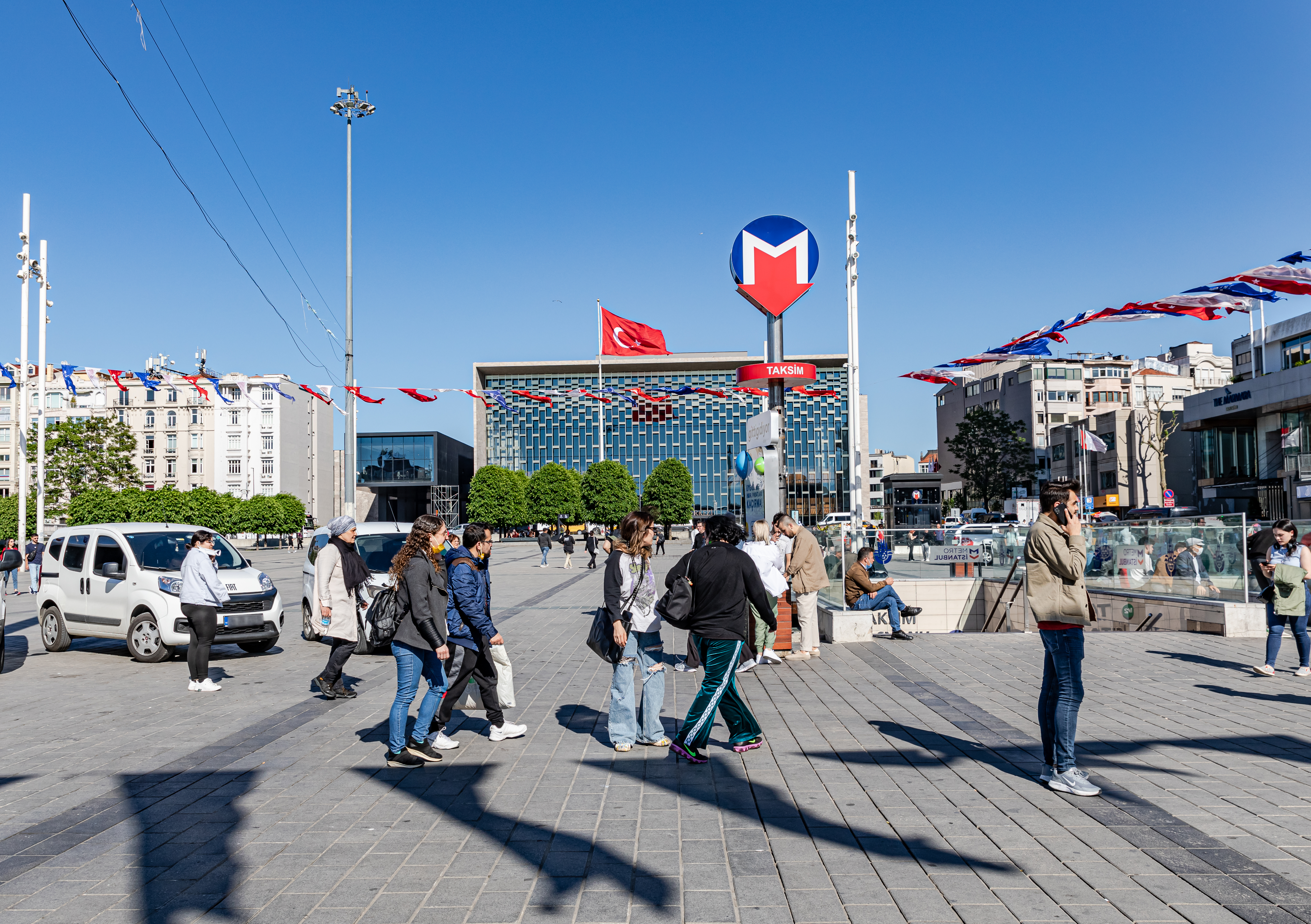
Atatürk Cultural Center at Taksim Square in 2022, with the entrance of the Taksim station of the Istanbul Metro.

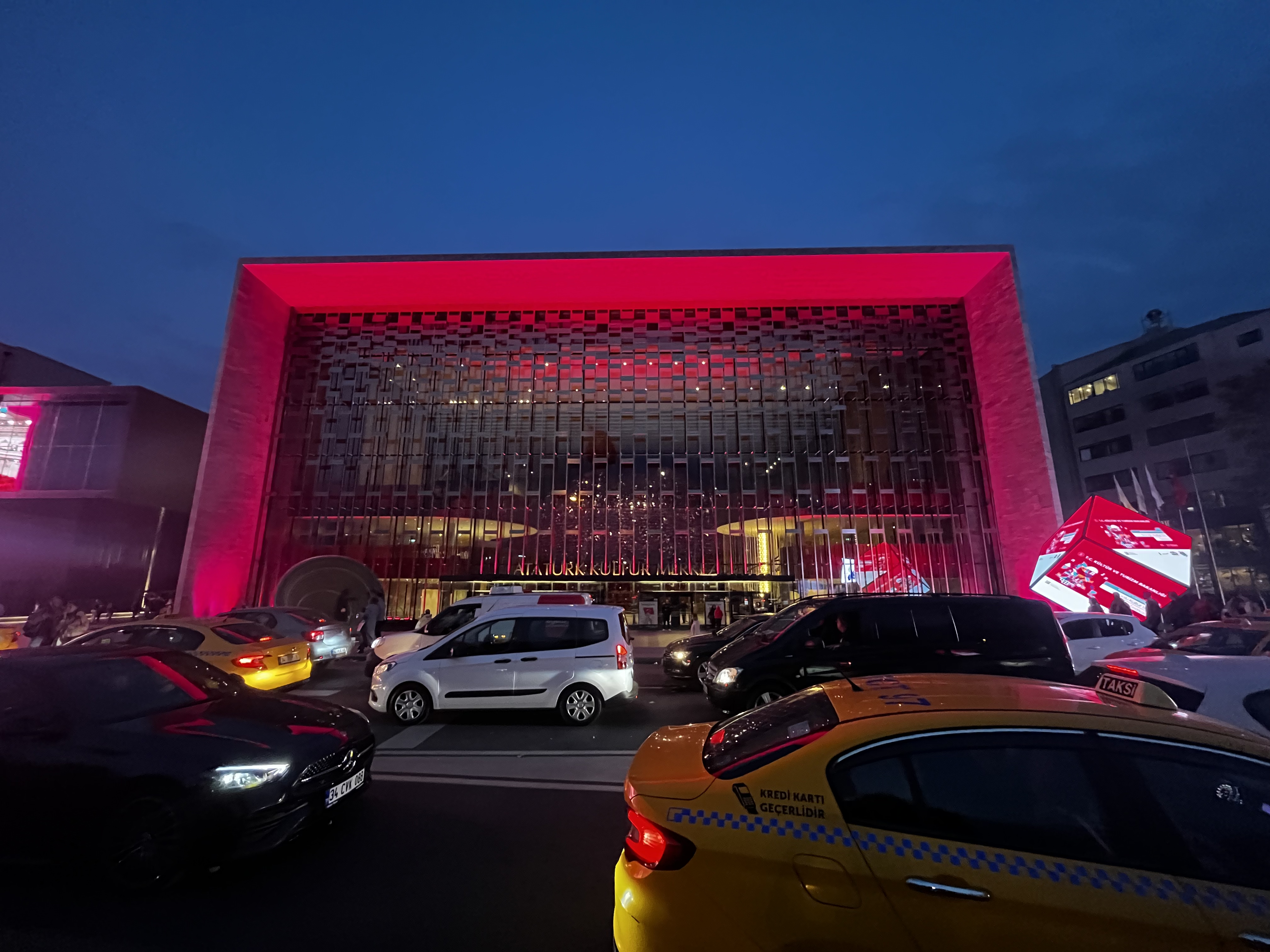
Renovated Atatürk Cultural Center at night

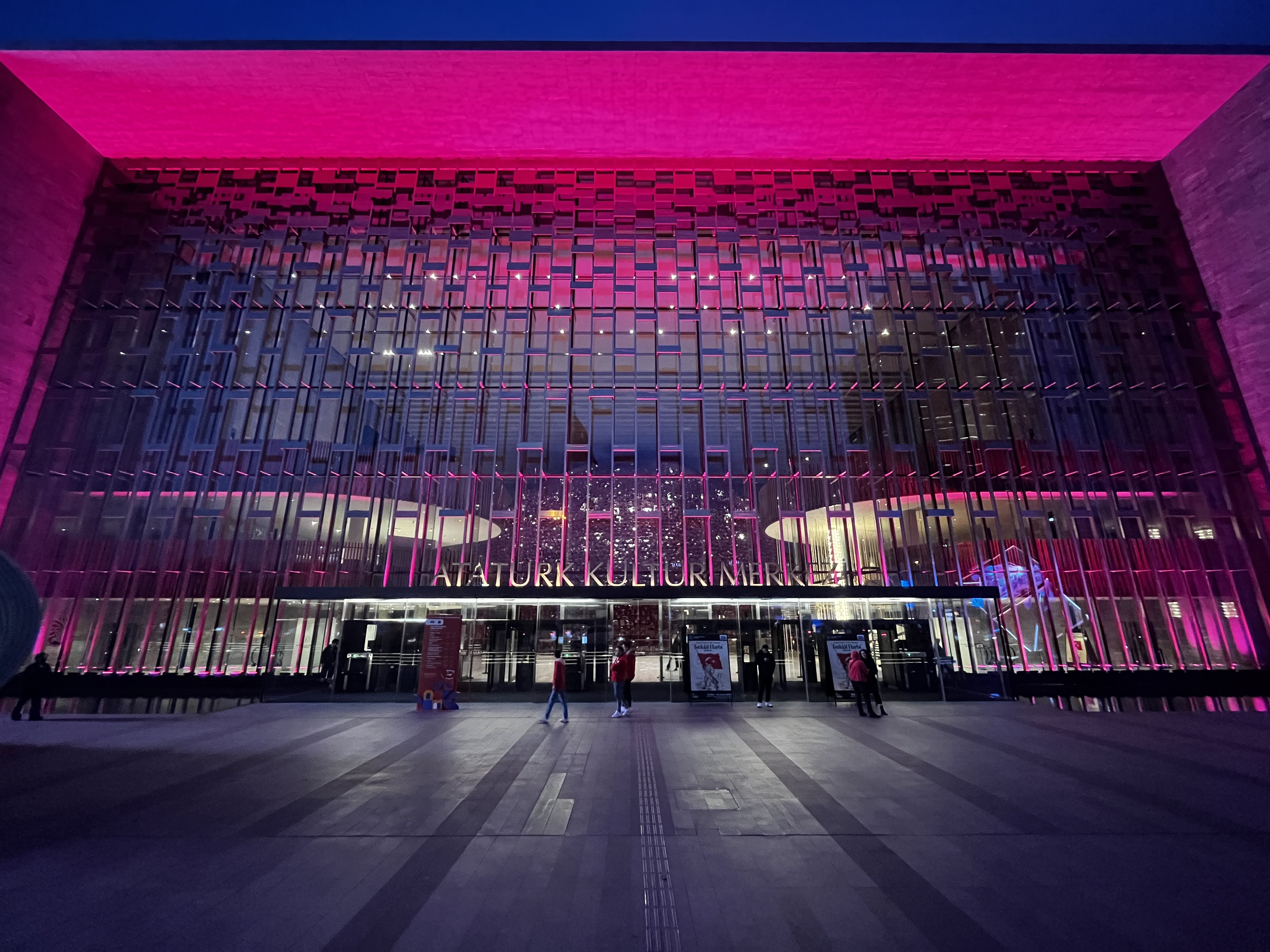
Renovated Atatürk Cultural Center at night
