= Henri Prost =

French architect and urban planner (1874–1959)

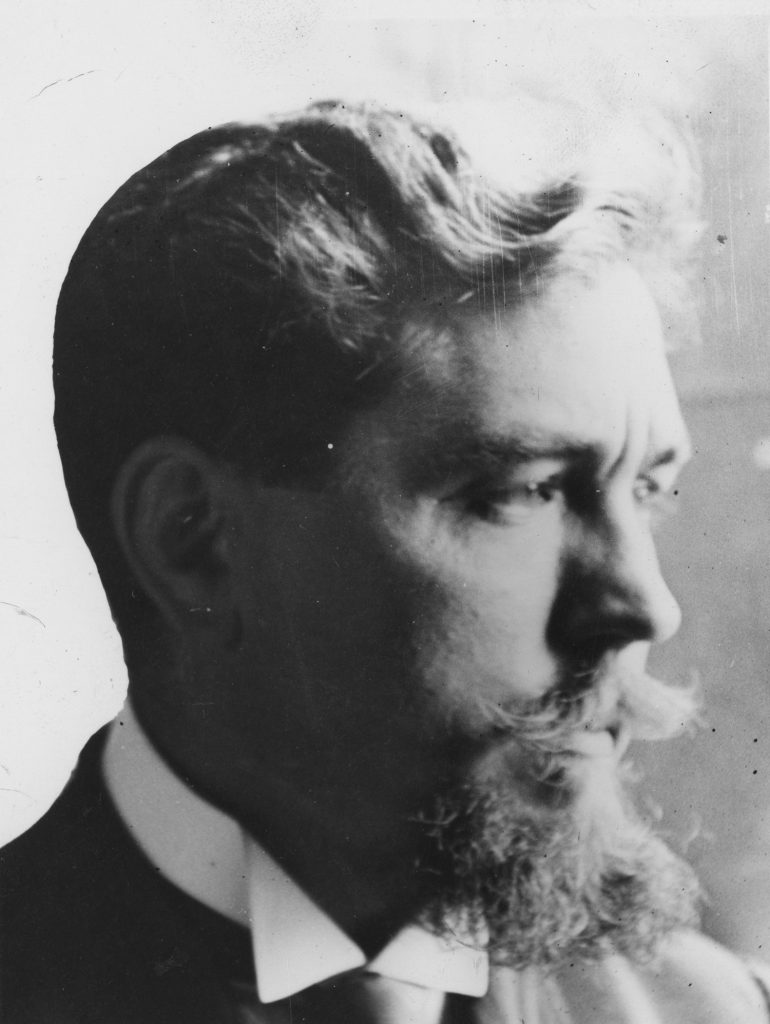
- Born: February 25, 1874; Saint-Denis, Seine-Saint-Denis, France
- Died: July 16, 1959 (aged 85)
- Education: École Spéciale d'Architecture and École des Beaux-Arts
- Occupation: Architect
- Practice: Architect and urban planner
- Projects: Redevelopment of Casablanca, Fes, Marrakesh, Meknes, Rabat, and Istanbul

Henri Prost (February 25, 1874 – July 16, 1959) was a French architect and urban planner born in Saint-Denis. He was noted particularly for his work in Morocco and Turkey, where he created a number of comprehensive city plans for Casablanca, Fes, Marrakesh, Meknes, Rabat, and Istanbul, including transportation infrastructure and avenues with buildings, plazas, squares, promenades and parks.

== Early years ==
Born in Saint-Denis, a northern suburb of Paris, Henri Prost studied architecture at the École Spéciale d'Architecture and at the École des Beaux-Arts. Among his teachers was Marcel Lambert, who surveyed the Acropolis in Athens. In 1902, he was awarded the prestigious Prix de Rome scholarship and was able to travel in Italy and Europe to study the architectural landmarks.

== Morocco ==
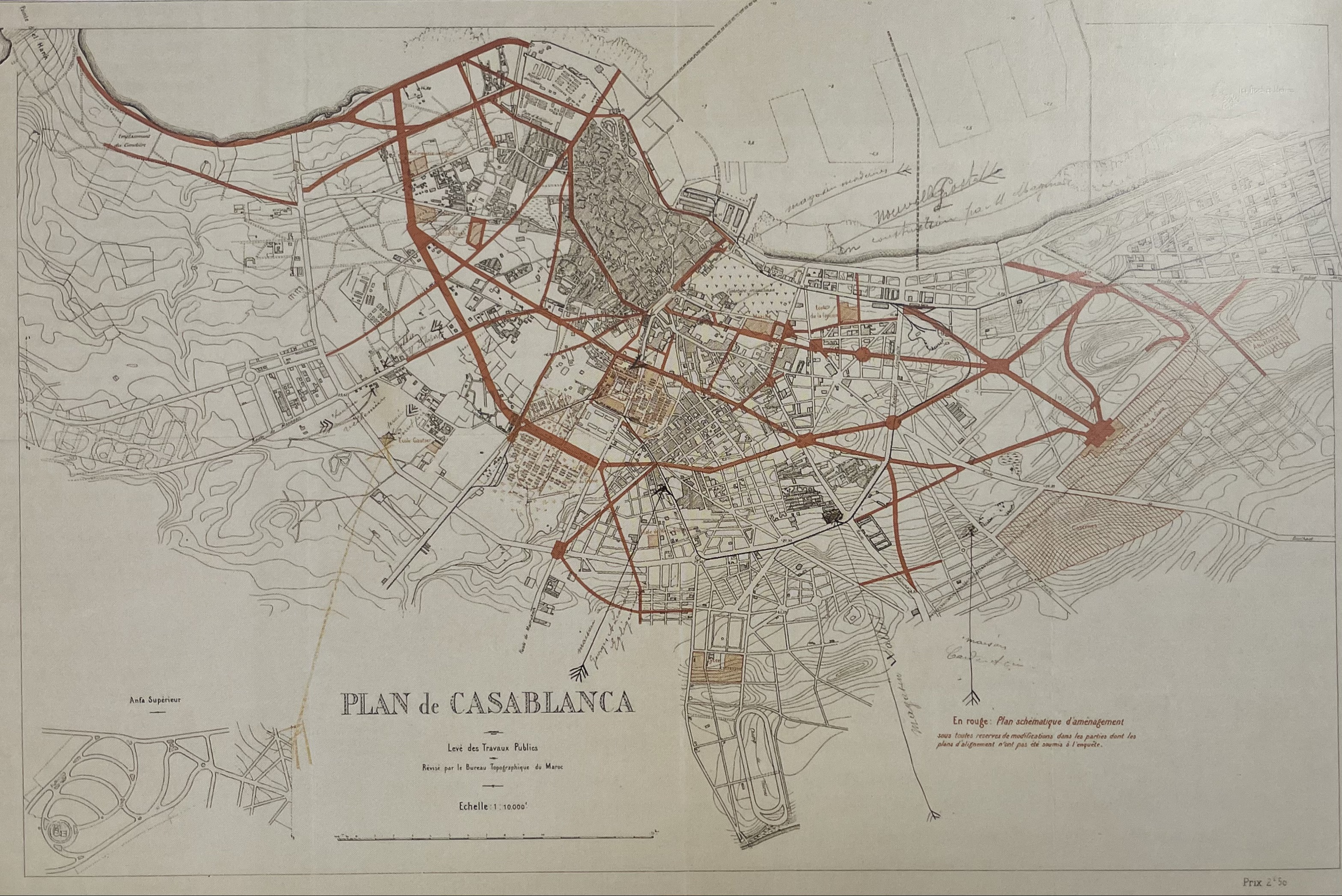
The preliminary layout of roads in Prost's 1917 development and extension plan for Casablanca.

In 1913, Hubert Lyautey, the military governor of the French Morocco invited Prost to work on the development of major Moroccan cities: Fes, Marrakesh, Meknes, Rabat and Casablanca. Prost stayed in Morocco for a decade, and soon Casablanca was lauded as a success story for the application of the principles of urbanism.

== France ==
After returning to France, Prost worked between 1923 and 1924 as a regional planner, developing a series of comprehensive urban plans for the Côte Varoise in the western part of the French Riviera. In 1932, he was invited to direct the regional urban studies of the Paris metropolitan area. The Plan d'Aménagement de la Région Parisienne that was developed under his tutelage was approved in 1939.

== Istanbul's redevelopment ==
Starting from 1924, Prost was consulting the government of Turkey on an irregular basis. In 1936, Prost was invited to Turkey by Mustafa Kemal Atatürk to develop a grand plan of Istanbul's redevelopment, and he stayed there for fifteen years. He became the head of the city's Planning Office and authored the master-plan of its architectural future. Modernization and conservation were laid at its core. Later in 1947, Prost explained his approach with these words:

The modernization of Istanbul can be compared to a chirurgical operation of the most delicate nature. It is not about creating a New City on a virgin land, but directing an Ancient Capital, in the process of complete social change, towards a Future, through which the mechanism and probably the redistribution of wealth will transform the conditions of existence. This City lives with an incredible activity. To realize the main axes of circulation without harming the commercial and industrial development, without stopping the construction of new settlements is an imperious economic and social necessity; however to conserve and protect the incomparable landscape, dominated by glorious edifices, is another necessity as imperious as the former.

After deciding to make drastic cuts through the network of historic Istanbul's neighborhoods with transportation corridors, broad avenues and pedestrian promenades, parks and monumental squares, Prost also started to work on preserving the remaining major historical monuments of Istanbul, including the Roman, Byzantine and Ottoman landmarks, and making them accessible to the public. After his plea, Atatürk approved the transformation of the Hagia Sophia, which served as the Grand Mosque of Istanbul, into a museum.

However, after all was said and done, it turned out that Prost's master-plan imposed a heavy interventionist burden on the historical structure of the city. It was criticized by Le Corbusier in 1948, who previously wrote a letter to Atatürk, advising him to conserve the city without even disturbing its historic dust. Among Prost's decisions considered controversial today, the demolition of the historic Taksim Military Barracks can be cited.

== Accomplishments ==
Henri Prost, along with Tony Garnier, Léon Jausseley, and Ernest Hébrard is considered as a pioneer of French urbanism. His ideas and architectural plans were representative of the first generation of French urbanists, with all their achievements and limitations. In 1902, Prost made a design drawing of a national printing office in Italy and was subsequently awarded with the Prix de Rome scholarship. His plans for the restoration of the Hagia Sophia in Constantinople received a medal at the Salon des Artistes Français in 1912. Prost was the co-founder in 1911 of the Société française des urbanistes (SFU) with architects Donat Alfred Agache, Mr. Auburtin, A. Bérard, Eugène Hénard (Architect of the City of Paris), Léon Jaussely, A. Parenty, engineer Jean Claude Nicolas Forestier and the landscape architect Edouard Redont. He became a member of the Central Society of Architects in 1930. He was elected as a member of the Academy of Fine Arts in 1933. He served as the Director of the Special School of Architecture from 1929 to 1959. On 23 January 1941, he was made a member of the National Council of Vichy France.
